= Lists of classical music =

This is a list of classical music-related lists.

== General ==
- List of classical and art music traditions
- Outline of classical music
- Outline of opera
- List of classical music genres
- List of opera genres

== Composers ==
=== General ===
- Lists of composers
- List of composers by name

=== By period or style ===
- Chronological lists of classical composers
- List of classical music composers by era
- List of medieval composers
- List of Renaissance composers
- List of Baroque composers
- List of Classical-era composers
- List of Romantic composers
- List of modernist composers
- List of 20th-century classical composers
- List of minimalist composers
- List of postminimalist composers
- List of postmodernist composers
- List of 21st-century classical composers

=== By nationality ===
- Chronological lists of classical composers by nationality
- List of composers by nationality
- List of composers for lute (nationality)
- List of composers of African descent
- List of Albanian composers
- List of American composers
- List of American Northwest composers
- Chronological list of American classical composers
- List of Argentine classical composers
- Chronological list of Argentine classical composers
- List of Armenian classical composers
- List of Armenian composers
- List of Australian composers
- Chronological list of Australian classical composers
- List of Austrian composers
- Chronological list of Austrian classical composers
- List of Azerbaijani composers
- List of Belgian classical composers
- Chronological list of Belgian classical composers
- List of Brazilian composers
- List of composers from Brittany
- List of British classical composers
- List of émigré musicians from Nazi Europe who settled in Britain
- List of Byzantine composers
- List of Canadian composers
- List of Chinese composers
- List of Croatian composers
- List of Czech composers
- Chronological list of Czech classical composers
- List of Danish composers
- List of Dutch composers
- List of Egyptian composers
- Chronological list of English classical composers
- List of Estonian composers
- List of Filipino composers
- List of Finnish composers
- List of French composers
- Chronological list of French classical composers
- List of German composers
- List of classical composers in the German Democratic Republic
- List of Greek composers
- List of Hawaiian composers
- List of Hungarian composers
- List of Icelandic composers
- List of Indian composers
- List of Indonesian composers
- List of Iranian composers
- List of Irish classical composers
- Chronological list of Irish classical composers
- List of Israeli classical composers
- List of Italian composers
- Chronological list of Italian classical composers
- List of Japanese composers
- List of Jewish American composers
- Chronological list of Korean classical composers
- List of Kosovan composers
- List of Lithuanian composers
- List of Luxembourgish composers
- List of Mexican composers of classical music
- List of 20th-century Mexican composers
- List of Mongolian composers
- List of Polish composers
- List of Portuguese composers
- List of Romanian composers
- List of Russian composers
- Chronological list of Scottish classical composers
- List of Serbian composers
- List of Slovak composers
- List of Slovenian composers
- List of South African composers
- List of Spanish composers
- Chronological list of Spanish classical composers
- List of Sri Lankan composers
- List of Swedish composers
- List of Swiss composers
- List of Turkish composers
- List of Ukrainian composers

=== By genre ===
- List of acousmatic-music composers
- List of Anglican church composers
- List of étude composers
- List of film score composers
- List of Magnificat composers
- List of composers of musicals
- List of major opera composers
- List of operetta composers
- List of ragtime composers
- List of string quartet composers
- List of symphony composers
- List of zarzuela composers

=== By instrument ===
- List of composers for the classical guitar
- List of composers for lute
- List of composers for lute (chronological)
- List of organ composers
- List of piano composers

=== Women composers ===
- List of 20th-century American women composers
- List of Australian women composers
- List of women composers by birth date
- List of women composers by name

=== Miscellaneous ===
- List of composers and their preferred lyricists
- List of composers depicted on film
- List of composers in the Mannheim school
- List of composers influenced by the Holocaust
- List of composers who immigrated to Mexico
- List of LGBT classical composers

== Other people ==
=== Musicians by instrument ===
- List of bassoonists
- List of cellists
- List of women classical cellists
- List of clarinetists
- List of classical double bass players
- List of flautists
- List of women classical flautists
- List of classical guitarists
- List of women classical guitarists
- List of hammered dulcimer players
- List of harpists
- List of classical harpists
- List of harpsichordists
- List of French harpsichordists
- List of horn players
- List of oboists
- List of organists
- List of classical pianists
- List of classical pianists (recorded)
- List of women classical pianists
- List of classical piano duos (performers)
- List of recorder players
- List of saxophonists
- List of trumpeters
- List of tuba players
- Lists of violinists
- List of classical violinists
- List of contemporary classical violinists
- List of female violinists
- List of Indian violinists
- List of Persian violinists
- List of violists

=== Conductors ===
- List of female classical conductors
- List of music directors of the Ojai Music Festival
- List of opera directors
- List of principal conductors by orchestra
- List of Tabernacle Choir music directors

=== Singers ===
- Chronological list of operatic sopranos
- List of Azerbaijani opera singers
- List of Danish operatic sopranos
- List of Finnish operatic sopranos
- List of Norwegian operatic sopranos
- List of operatic contraltos
- List of performers at the Metropolitan Opera
- List of Russian opera singers
- List of Swedish operatic sopranos
- List of Ukrainian opera singers

=== Miscellaneous ===
- List of music students by teacher: A to B
- List of music students by teacher: C to F
- List of music students by teacher: G to J
- List of music students by teacher: K to M
- List of music students by teacher: N to Q
- List of music students by teacher: R to S
- List of music students by teacher: T to Z
- List of prize-winners of the International Johann Sebastian Bach Competition
- List of Sun Aria winners
- List of African-American women in classical music
- List of centenarians (musicians, composers and music patrons)
- List of chief music critics
- List of child music prodigies
- List of experimental musicians
- List of fellows of the Royal College of Music
- List of jurors of the International Chopin Piano Competition
- List of music biographies in Rees's Cyclopaedia
- List of New England Conservatory people
- List of opera librettists
- List of operatic pop artists
- List of people associated with the Royal Academy of Music
- List of Royal College of Music people
- List of royal musicians
- List of University of Music and Performing Arts Vienna alumni
- List of women music publishers before 1900

== Works ==
=== By composer ===
- List of compositions by Aaron Copland
- List of compositions by Agostino Steffani
- List of compositions by Aivars Kalējs
- List of compositions by Akil Mark Koci
- List of compositions by Alan Bush
- List of compositions by Alan Hovhaness
- List of compositions by Alban Berg
- List of compositions by Albert Dietrich
- List of compositions by Alexander Agricola
- List of compositions by Alexander Borodin
- List of compositions by Alexander Dreyschock
- List of compositions by Alexander Glazunov
- List of compositions by Alexander Mackenzie
- List of compositions by Alexander Mosolov
- List of compositions by Alexander Scriabin
- List of compositions by Alexander Tcherepnin
- List of compositions by Alexander von Zemlinsky
- List of compositions by Alexandre Goria
- List of compositions by Alfred Schnittke
- List of compositions by Alois Hába
- List of compositions by Amy Beach
- List of compositions by André Previn
- List of compositions by Anton Bruckner
- List of chamber music works by Anton Bruckner
- List of cantatas by Anton Bruckner
- List of lieder by Anton Bruckner
- List of masses by Anton Bruckner
- List of motets by Anton Bruckner
- List of organ compositions by Anton Bruckner
- List of piano compositions by Anton Bruckner
- List of psalm settings by Anton Bruckner
- List of secular choral works by Anton Bruckner
- List of compositions by Anton Diabelli
- List of compositions by Anton Reicha
- List of compositions by Anton Rubinstein
- List of compositions by Anton Webern
- List of compositions by Antonín Dvořák
- List of compositions by Antonín Dvořák by genre
- List of compositions by Antonio Salieri
- List of compositions by Antonio Vivaldi
- List of compositions by Aram Khachaturian
- List of compositions by Arlene Sierra
- List of compositions by Arnold Bax
- List of compositions by Arnold Schoenberg
- List of compositions by Artemy Vedel
- List of compositions by Arthur Bliss
- List of compositions by Arthur Honegger
- List of compositions by Arthur Sullivan
- List of compositions by Arvo Pärt
- List of compositions by Aulis Sallinen
- List of compositions by Bedřich Smetana
- List of compositions by Béla Bartók
- List of string quartets by Béla Bartók
- List of compositions by Benjamin Britten
- List of compositions by Betsy Jolas
- List of compositions by Bill McGlaughlin
- List of compositions by Bohuslav Martinů
- List of compositions by Borys Lyatoshynsky
- List of compositions by Božidar Kantušer
- List of compositions by Bruno Maderna
- List of compositions by Camille Saint-Saëns
- List of compositions by Carl Czerny
- List of compositions by Carl Loewe
- List of compositions by Carl Maria von Weber
- List of compositions by Carl Nielsen
- List of songs composed by Carl Nielsen
- List of compositions by Carl Philipp Emanuel Bach
- List of compositions by Carlo Gesualdo
- List of compositions by Carlos Chávez
- List of compositions by Carlos Salzedo
- List of compositions by Caroline Shaw
- List of compositions by Cécile Chaminade
- List of compositions by César Cui
- List of compositions by César Franck
- List of compositions by Charles Gounod
- List of compositions by Charles Ives
- List of works by Charles Thomas Cozens
- List of compositions by Charles Wuorinen
- List of compositions by Charles-Valentin Alkan
- List of compositions by Charles Villiers Stanford
- List of compositions by Christian Sinding
- List of compositions by Christoph Willibald Gluck
- List of compositions by Clara Schumann
- List of compositions by Claude Debussy
- List of compositions by Claudio Monteverdi
- List of compositions by Clémence de Grandval
- List of compositions by Constant Lambert
- List of cantatas by Christoph Graupner
- List of chamber pieces by Christoph Graupner
- List of concertos by Christoph Graupner
- List of harpsichord pieces by Christoph Graupner
- List of orchestral suites by Christoph Graupner
- List of symphonies by Christoph Graupner
- List of compositions by Dag Wirén
- List of compositions by Dane Rudhyar
- List of compositions by Darius Milhaud
- List of compositions by Daron Hagen
- List of compositions by David Maslanka
- List of compositions by Dieterich Buxtehude
- List of compositions by Dmitry Kabalevsky
- List of compositions by Dmitri Shostakovich
- List of compositions by Domenico Cimarosa
- List of solo keyboard sonatas by Domenico Scarlatti
- List of compositions by Donald Tovey
- List of compositions by Édouard Lalo
- List of compositions by Eduard Strauss
- List of compositions by Edvard Grieg
- List of compositions by Edward Elgar
- List of compositions by Einojuhani Rautavaara
- List of compositions by Elisabeth Lutyens
- List of compositions by Elliott Carter
- List of compositions by Elmer Bernstein
- List of compositions by Emilie Mayer
- List of compositions by Emilio Pujol
- List of compositions by Emmanuel Chabrier
- List of compositions by Enrique Granados
- List of compositions by Eric Coates
- List of compositions by Erich Wolfgang Korngold
- List of compositions by Erik Chisholm
- List of compositions by Erik Satie
- List of compositions by Erkki Melartin
- List of compositions by Ernest Bloch
- List of compositions by Ernest Chausson
- List of compositions by Ernst Krenek
- List of compositions by Ethel Smyth
- List of compositions by Eugene Aynsley Goossens
- List of compositions by Eugène Bozza
- List of compositions by F. Melius Christiansen
- List of compositions by Fabio Vacchi
- List of compositions by Fanny Hensel
- List of compositions by Faye-Ellen Silverman
- List of compositions by Felix Blumenfeld
- List of compositions by Felix Mendelssohn
- List of solo piano compositions by Felix Mendelssohn
- List of compositions by Felix Weingartner
- List of compositions by Ferdinando Carulli
- List of compositions by Fernando Sor
- List of compositions by Ferruccio Busoni
- List of adaptations by Ferruccio Busoni
- List of compositions by Francis Poulenc
- List of solo piano compositions by Francis Poulenc
- List of compositions by Francisco Tárrega
- List of compositions by Franco Donatoni
- List of compositions by François-Adrien Boieldieu
- List of compositions by François Couperin
- List of compositions by Frank Bridge
- List of compositions by Franz Benda
- List of compositions by Franz Krommer
- List of compositions by Franz Lachner
- List of compositions by Franz Liszt
- Transcriptions by Franz Liszt
- List of compositions by Franz Schubert
- List of compositions by Franz Schubert (1810)
- List of compositions by Franz Schubert (1811)
- List of compositions by Franz Schubert (1812)
- List of compositions by Franz Schubert (1813)
- List of compositions by Franz Schubert (1814)
- List of compositions by Franz Schubert (1815)
- List of compositions by Franz Schubert (1816)
- List of compositions by Franz Schubert (1817)
- List of compositions by Franz Schubert (1818)
- List of compositions by Franz Schubert (1819)
- List of compositions by Franz Schubert (1820)
- List of compositions by Franz Schubert (1821)
- List of compositions by Franz Schubert (1822)
- List of compositions by Franz Schubert (1823)
- List of compositions by Franz Schubert (1824)
- List of compositions by Franz Schubert (1825)
- List of compositions by Franz Schubert (1826)
- List of compositions by Franz Schubert (1827)
- List of compositions by Franz Schubert (1828)
- List of compositions by Franz Schubert (arrangements)
- List of compositions by Franz Schubert (copies)
- List of compositions by Franz Schubert (doubtful and spurious)
- List of compositions by Franz Schubert (undated)
- List of compositions by Franz Schubert by genre
- List of songs by Franz Schubert
- List of compositions by Frederic Austin
- List of compositions by Frédéric Chopin by genre
- List of compositions by Frédéric Chopin by opus number
- Miscellaneous compositions (Chopin)
- List of compositions by Frederic Rzewski
- List of compositions by Frederick Delius
- List of compositions by Frederik Magle
- List of compositions by Friedrich Kalkbrenner
- List of compositions by Friedrich Kiel
- List of compositions by Friedrich Kuhlau
- List of compositions by Fritz Kreisler
- List of compositions by Gabriel Fauré
- List of compositions by Geirr Tveitt
- List of compositions by Geoffrey Bush
- List of compositions by Georg Böhm
- List of compositions by George Enescu
- List of compositions by George Frideric Handel
- List of compositions by George Gershwin
- List of compositions by George Onslow
- List of compositions by George Whitefield Chadwick
- List of compositions by Georges Bizet
- List of compositions by Gerald Finzi
- List of compositions by Germaine Tailleferre
- List of compositions by Giacinto Scelsi
- List of compositions by Giacomo Puccini
- List of compositions by Gioachino Rossini
- List of compositions by Giovanni Bottesini
- List of compositions by Giovanni Pierluigi da Palestrina
- List of compositions by Giovanni Sgambati
- List of compositions by Girolamo Frescobaldi
- List of compositions by Giuseppe Corsi
- List of compositions by Giuseppe Verdi
- List of compositions by Glenn Gould
- List of compositions by Gottfried Heinrich Stölzel
- List of compositions by Graham Waterhouse
- List of compositions by Gregory Short
- List of compositions by Guillaume de Machaut
- List of compositions by Guillaume Lekeu
- List of works by Günter Kochan
- List of compositions by Gustav Holst
- List of compositions by Gustav Mahler
- List of compositions by György Kurtág
- List of compositions by György Ligeti
- List of compositions by Hans Werner Henze
- List of compositions by Harrison Birtwistle
- List of works by Harry Partch
- List of works by Hector Berlioz
- List of compositions by Heinrich Schütz
- List of compositions by Heitor Villa-Lobos
- List of compositions by Henri Dutilleux
- List of compositions by Henri Herz
- List of compositions by Henri Vieuxtemps
- List of compositions by Henrique Oswald
- List of compositions by Henry Cowell
- List of compositions by Henry Litolff
- List of compositions by Henry Purcell
- List of compositions by Henryk Górecki
- List of compositions by Herbert Howells
- List of compositions by Howard Skempton
- List of compositions by Hubert Parry
- List of compositions by Iannis Xenakis
- List of compositions by Ignaz Brüll
- List of compositions by Ignaz Moscheles
- List of compositions by Igor Stravinsky
- List of compositions by Imogen Holst
- List of compositions by Isaac Albéniz
- List of compositions by Jacques Champion de Chambonnières
- List of compositions by Jacques Offenbach
- List of compositions by Jake Heggie
- List of compositions by James Hotchkiss Rogers
- List of compositions by James MacMillan
- List of compositions by James Scott
- List of compositions by Jan Dismas Zelenka
- List of compositions by Jan Kalivoda
- List of compositions by Jan Ladislav Dussek
- List of compositions by Jane Joseph
- List of compositions by Jean Françaix
- List of compositions by Jean Guillou
- List of compositions by Jean Langlais
- List of compositions by Jean Sibelius
- List of compositions by Jean-Baptiste Lully
- List of compositions by Jean-Claude Éloy
- List of compositions by Jennifer Higdon
- List of compositions by Jenő Hubay
- List of compositions by Joachim Raff
- List of compositions by Joaquín Turina
- List of compositions by Johann Adolph Hasse
- List of compositions by Johann Baptist Wanhal
- List of compositions by Johann Christian Bach
- List of compositions by Johann David Heinichen
- List of compositions by Johann Jakob Froberger
- List of compositions by Johann Joachim Quantz
- List of works by Johann Karl von Ordonez
- List of compositions by Johann Ludwig Krebs
- List of compositions by Johann Nepomuk Hummel
- List of compositions by Johann Pachelbel
- List of compositions by Johann Peter Pixis
- List of compositions by Johann Sebastian Bach
- List of Bach cantatas
- List of chamber music works by Johann Sebastian Bach
- List of chorale harmonisations by Johann Sebastian Bach
- List of compositions by Johann Sebastian Bach printed during his lifetime
- List of concertos by Johann Sebastian Bach
- List of fugal works by Johann Sebastian Bach
- List of keyboard and lute compositions by Johann Sebastian Bach
- List of masses, passions and oratorios by Johann Sebastian Bach
- List of motets by Johann Sebastian Bach
- List of orchestral works by Johann Sebastian Bach
- List of organ compositions by Johann Sebastian Bach
- List of secular cantatas by Johann Sebastian Bach
- List of songs and arias by Johann Sebastian Bach
- List of transcriptions of compositions by Johann Sebastian Bach
- List of compositions by Johann Strauss II
- List of compositions by Johanna Senfter
- List of compositions by Johannes Brahms
- List of compositions by John Cage
- List of compositions by John Corigliano
- List of compositions by John Philip Sousa
- List of marches by John Philip Sousa
- List of compositions by John Woolrich
- List of compositions by Jörg Widmann
- List of compositions by José Vianna da Motta
- List of compositions by Josef Bohuslav Foerster
- List of compositions by Josef Suk
- List of compositions by Josef Tal
- List of compositions by Joseph Haydn
- List of concertos by Joseph Haydn
- List of Masses by Joseph Haydn
- List of piano trios by Joseph Haydn
- List of solo piano compositions by Joseph Haydn
- List of string quartets by Joseph Haydn
- List of symphonies by Joseph Haydn
- List of compositions by Joseph Holbrooke
- List of compositions by Joseph Martin Kraus
- List of compositions by Josquin des Prez
- List of compositions by Juan Crisóstomo Arriaga
- List of compositions by Juan María Solare
- List of compositions by Jules Massenet
- List of compositions by Julius Harrison
- List of compositions by Kaija Saariaho
- List of compositions by Kaikhosru Shapurji Sorabji
- List of compositions by Kalevi Aho
- List of dances and marches by Karl Michael Ziehrer
- List of compositions by Karlheinz Stockhausen
- List of compositions by Karol Szymanowski
- List of compositions by Katherine Hoover
- List of compositions by Krzysztof Penderecki
- List of compositions by Kurt Atterberg
- List of compositions by Larry Thomas Bell
- List of compositions by Lars-Erik Larsson
- List of compositions by Leevi Madetoja
- List of symphonies by Leif Segerstam
- List of compositions by Leo Brouwer
- List of compositions by Léo Delibes
- List of solo piano compositions by Leo Ornstein
- List of compositions by Leo Sowerby
- List of compositions by Leonard Bernstein
- List of compositions by Leopold Koželuch
- List of compositions by Leoš Janáček
- List of compositions by Lera Auerbach
- List of compositions by Libby Larsen
- List of compositions by Lord Berners
- List of compositions by Lorenzo Perosi
- List of compositions by Lou Harrison
- List of compositions by Louis Couperin
- List of compositions by Louis Spohr
- List of compositions by Louis Vierne
- List of compositions by Luciano Berio
- List of compositions by Ludwig van Beethoven
- List of compositions by Luigi Boccherini
- List of compositions by Luigi Nono
- List of compositions by Luise Adolpha Le Beau
- List of compositions by Lukas Foss
- List of compositions by Malcolm Arnold
- List of compositions by Malcolm Williamson
- List of compositions by Manuel de Falla
- List of compositions by Marcel Dupré
- List of compositions by Maria Szymanowska
- List of compositions by Mario Castelnuovo-Tedesco
- List of compositions by Martin Lohse
- List of compositions by Matteo Carcassi
- List of compositions by Maurice Ravel
- List of compositions by Mauricio Kagel
- List of compositions by Mauro Giuliani
- List of compositions by Max Bruch
- List of compositions by Max Reger
- List of compositions by Michael Daugherty
- List of compositions by Michael Finnissy
- List of compositions by Michael Haydn
- List of compositions by Michael Tippett
- List of compositions by Michael Torke
- List of compositions by Mieczysław Weinberg
- List of compositions by Mikhail Glinka
- List of compositions by Mikhail Ippolitov-Ivanov
- List of compositions by Miklós Rózsa
- List of compositions by Mily Balakirev
- List of compositions by Modest Mussorgsky
- List of compositions by Moritz Moszkowski
- List of compositions by Morton Feldman
- List of compositions by Muzio Clementi
- List of compositions by Nancy Van de Vate
- List of compositions by Ned Rorem
- List of compositions by Niccolò Paganini
- List of compositions by Nicolae Bretan
- List of compositions by Niels Gade
- List of compositions by Niels Viggo Bentzon
- List of compositions by Nikolai Kapustin
- List of compositions by Nikolai Medtner
- List of compositions by Nikolai Myaskovsky
- List of compositions by Nikolai Rimsky-Korsakov
- List of compositions by Nikos Skalkottas
- List of compositions by Nino Rota
- List of compositions by Olivier Messiaen
- List of compositions by Orlando Gibbons
- List of compositions by Otar Taktakishvili
- List of compositions by Othmar Schoeck
- List of compositions by Otto Albert Tichý
- List of compositions by Ottorino Respighi
- List of compositions by P. D. Q. Bach
- List of compositions by Paul Hindemith
- List of compositions by Paul Juon
- List of compositions by Paul Manz
- List of compositions by Paul Moravec
- List of compositions by Percy Grainger
- List of compositions by Percy Pitt
- List of compositions by Péter Eötvös
- List of compositions by Peter Maxwell Davies
- List of compositions by Peter Warlock
- List of compositions by Philip Glass
- List of compositions by Pierre Boulez
- List of compositions by Pierre Rode
- List of compositions by Pyotr Ilyich Tchaikovsky
- List of compositions by Ralph Vaughan Williams
- List of compositions by Rebecca Clarke
- List of compositions by Reynaldo Hahn
- List of compositions by Richard Strauss
- List of compositions by Richard Wagner
- List of compositions by Robert Moevs
- List of compositions by Robert Schumann
- List of solo piano compositions by Robert Schumann
- List of vocal compositions by Robert Schumann
- List of compositions by Robert Simpson
- List of compositions by Robert Volkmann
- List of compositions by Salvatore Sciarrino
- List of compositions by Samuel Barber
- List of compositions by Scott Joplin
- List of compositions by Seán Doherty
- List of compositions by Sergei Bortkiewicz
- List of compositions by Sergei Prokofiev
- List of compositions by Sergei Rachmaninoff
- List of compositions by Sergei Taneyev
- List of compositions by Sigismond Thalberg
- List of compositions by Silvestre Revueltas
- List of compositions by Simon Mayr
- List of compositions by Stanisław Moniuszko
- List of compositions by Stefan Wolpe
- List of compositions by Swan Hennessy
- List of compositions by Sylvius Leopold Weiss
- List of compositions by Teresa Carreño
- List of compositions by Theodor Kirchner
- List of compositions by Thomas Adès
- List of compositions by Thomas Arne
- List of compositions by Thomas de Hartmann
- List of compositions by Thomas Tallis
- List of compositions by Tielman Susato
- List of compositions by Tobias Picker
- List of compositions by Tomáš Svoboda
- List of compositions by Tomaso Albinoni
- List of compositions by Tōru Takemitsu
- List of compositions by Vagn Holmboe
- List of compositions by Victor Herbert
- List of compositions by Viktor Kosenko
- List of compositions by Vincent d'Indy
- List of compositions by Walter Carroll
- List of compositions by Wilhelm Kienzl
- List of compositions by William Bolcom
- List of compositions by William Boyce
- List of compositions by William Byrd
- List of compositions by William Sterndale Bennett
- List of compositions by William Walton
- List of compositions by Witold Lutosławski
- List of compositions by Wolfgang Amadeus Mozart
- List of concert arias, songs and canons by Wolfgang Amadeus Mozart
- List of masses by Wolfgang Amadeus Mozart
- List of solo piano compositions by Wolfgang Amadeus Mozart
- List of symphonies by Wolfgang Amadeus Mozart
- Mozart symphonies of spurious or doubtful authenticity
- List of compositions by Wolfgang Rihm
- List of compositions by Yehuda Yannay
- List of compositions by York Bowen
- List of compositions by Zdeněk Fibich
- List of compositions by Zygmunt Stojowski

=== Stage works by composer ===
- List of operas by Adolphe Adam
- List of ballets by Adolphe Adam
- List of operas by Alessandro Scarlatti
- List of operas by Ambroise Thomas
- List of operas by Amilcare Ponchielli
- List of operas by André Grétry
- List of works for the stage by Antônio Carlos Gomes
- List of operas by Antonio Salieri
- List of operas by Antonio Vivaldi
- List of operas by Baldassare Galuppi
- List of operas by Bedřich Smetana
- List of operas by Carl Maria von Weber
- List of operettas by Carl Michael Ziehrer
- List of operettas and operas by Carl Millöcker
- List of operas by Carlo Coccia
- List of operas and operettas by Charles Lecocq
- List of operas by Christoph Willibald Gluck
- List of operas by Claudio Monteverdi
- List of operas by Daniel Auber
- List of operas and operettas by Edmond Audran
- List of operas and operettas by Emmanuel Chabrier
- List of operas by Ermanno Wolf-Ferrari
- List of operas by Ernst Krenek
- List of operas by Étienne Méhul
- List of operas by Eugen d'Albert
- List of operas by Ferdinando Paer
- List of operas by Florian Leopold Gassmann
- List of operas by Francesco Bianchi
- List of operas by Francesco Gasparini
- List of operas by Franco Alfano
- List of operas by François-Adrien Boieldieu
- List of operas by François-André Danican Philidor
- List of operas and operettas by Franz Lehár
- List of operas by Friedrich von Flotow
- List of operas by Gaetano Donizetti
- List of operas by Gaetano Latilla
- List of operas by Gaspare Spontini
- List of operas by Georg Philipp Telemann
- List of operas by George Frideric Handel
- List of operas by Giacomo Meyerbeer
- List of operas by Gioachino Rossini
- List of operas by Giovanni Pacini
- List of operas by Giuseppe Bonno
- List of operas by Giuseppe Sarti
- List of operas by Heinrich Marschner
- List of stage and broadcast works by Heinrich Sutermeister
- List of operettas by Jacques Offenbach
- List of operas by Jean-Philippe Rameau
- List of operas by Johann Adam Hiller
- List of operas by Johann Adolph Hasse
- List of works for the stage by Johann Friedrich Reichardt
- List of operettas by Johann Strauss II
- List of operettas by John Philip Sousa
- List of operas by Josef Mysliveček
- List of operas by Joseph Haydn
- List of operas by Jules Massenet
- List of works for the stage by Kurt Weill
- List of operas and operettas by Léo Delibes
- List of works for the stage by Lorenzo Ferrero
- List of operas by Luigi Cherubini
- List of zarzuelas by Miguel Marqués
- List of operas by Niccolò Piccinni
- List of operas by Nicola Porpora
- List of operas by Ottorino Respighi
- List of operas by Pasquale Anfossi
- List of operas by Paul Hindemith
- List of operas by Pierre-Alexandre Monsigny
- List of operas by Pietro Alessandro Guglielmi
- List of works for the stage by Reynaldo Hahn
- List of operas by Riccardo Zandonai
- List of operas by Richard Strauss
- List of works for the stage by Richard Wagner
- List of operas by Siegfried Wagner
- List of operas by Simon Mayr
- List of operas by Tommaso Traetta
- List of operas by Wolfgang Amadeus Mozart

=== By genre ===
- List of choral symphonies
- List of church cantatas by liturgical occasion
- List of concerti grossi
- List of dodecaphonic and serial compositions
- List of longest non-repetitive piano pieces
- List of oratorios
- List of organ symphonies
- List of program music
- List of solo cello pieces
- List of solo violin pieces
- List of sonatas
- List of symphonic poems
- List of symphonies by number
- List of symphonies with names
- List of tarantellas
- List of violin sonatas

=== By instrument ===
- List of compositions for accordion and string quartet
- List of compositions for cello and orchestra
- List of compositions for cello and organ
- List of compositions for cello and piano
- List of compositions for double bass
- List of compositions for electronic keyboard
- List of compositions for flute
- List of compositions for guitar
- List of compositions for harp
- List of compositions for horn
- List of compositions for keyboard and orchestra
- List of compositions for organ
- List of compositions for piano and orchestra
- List of compositions for piano duo
- List of compositions for saxophone, piano and percussion
- List of compositions for two violins
- List of compositions for viola: A to B
- List of compositions for viola: C to E
- List of compositions for viola: F to H
- List of compositions for viola: I to K
- List of compositions for viola: L to N
- List of compositions for viola: O to R
- List of compositions for viola: S
- List of compositions for viola: T to Z
- List of compositions for violin and orchestra
- List of concert band literature
- List of concert works for saxophone
- List of concertos for cor anglais
- List of double concertos for violin and cello
- List of recorder music
- List of triple concertos for violin, cello, and piano
- List of works for piano left-hand and orchestra
- Bassoon repertoire
- Brass quintet repertoire
- Classical guitar repertoire
- Euphonium repertoire
- Organ repertoire
- Piano trio repertoire
- String instrument repertoire
- String quintet repertoire
- Trombone repertoire
- Trumpet repertoire
- Tuba repertoire
- Viola repertoire
- List of British clarinet sonatas

=== By key or tonality ===
- List of major/minor compositions
- List of piano concertos by key
- List of symphonies by key
- List of symphonies in A major
- List of symphonies in A minor
- List of symphonies in A-flat major
- List of symphonies in A-flat minor
- List of symphonies in B major
- List of symphonies in B minor
- List of symphonies in B-flat major
- List of symphonies in B-flat minor
- List of symphonies in C major
- List of symphonies in C minor
- List of symphonies in C-sharp minor
- List of symphonies in D major
- List of symphonies in D minor
- List of symphonies in D-flat major
- List of symphonies in E major
- List of symphonies in E minor
- List of symphonies in E-flat major
- List of symphonies in E-flat minor
- List of symphonies in F major
- List of symphonies in F minor
- List of symphonies in F-sharp major
- List of symphonies in F-sharp minor
- List of symphonies in G major
- List of symphonies in G minor
- List of symphonies in G-sharp minor
- List of atonal compositions
- List of dodecaphonic and serial compositions
- List of pieces that use the whole-tone scale
- List of polytonal pieces
- List of quarter tone pieces
- Music written in all major or minor keys

=== Operas ===
- Lists of operas
- List of operas by composer
- List of operas by title
- List of prominent operas
- List of operettas
- List of Argentine operas
- List of Christmas operas
- List of Mexican operas
- List of North Korean operas
- List of operas set in the Crusades
- List of Orphean operas
- List of radio operas
- List of television operas

=== Opera repertoire ===
- List of operas performed at the Santa Fe Opera
- List of operas performed at the Wexford Festival
- Glyndebourne Festival Opera: history and repertoire, 1934–51
- Glyndebourne Festival Opera: history and repertoire, 1952–63
- Opera at the Edinburgh International Festival: history and repertoire, 1947–1956
- Opera at the Edinburgh International Festival: history and repertoire, 1957–1966
- Opera at the Edinburgh International Festival: history and repertoire, 1967–1976
- Opera North: history and repertoire, seasons 1978–79 to 1980–81
- Opera North: history and repertoire, seasons 1981–82 to 1989–90
- Opera North: history and repertoire, seasons 1990–91 to 1996–97
- Opera North: history and repertoire, seasons 1997–98 to 2003–04
- Opera North: history and repertoire, seasons 2004–05 to present
- Repertoire of Plácido Domingo
- Repertory of the Vienna Court Opera under Gustav Mahler
- Salzburg Festival: history and repertoire, 1922–1926
- Salzburg Festival: history and repertoire, 1935–1937
- Operas performed at the Teatro San Cassiano
- List of Bayreuth Festival productions of Der Ring des Nibelungen

=== Miscellaneous ===
- Classic 100 Countdowns
- List of classical music sub-titles, nicknames and non-numeric titles
- List of hymns for Pentecost
- List of jazz-influenced classical compositions
- List of literary works by César Cui
- List of musical pieces which use extended techniques
- List of musical works recorded by Daniil Trifonov
- List of prose works by Richard Wagner
- List of Roger Woodward's principal first performances, recordings, and publications
- List of unpublished musical compositions
- List of variations on a theme by another composer
- List of variations on Pachelbel's Canon
- List of works commissioned by the Royal Philharmonic Society
- List of works premiered at the Teatro Capranica
- Classical music written in collaboration
- Composer tributes (classical music)
- Music based on the works of Oscar Wilde
- Musical settings of sayings of Jesus on the cross
- Works associated with Paul Wittgenstein

== Instruments ==
- List of medieval musical instruments
- List of musical instruments
- List of period instruments
- List of Stradivarius instruments
- List of luthiers
- List of piano manufacturers
- List of euphonium, baritone horn and tenor horn manufacturers
- List of musical instruments by Hornbostel–Sachs number

== Groups, institutions and places ==
=== Orchestras, ensembles and choirs ===
- List of Celtic choirs
- List of contemporary classical ensembles
- List of early music ensembles
- List of radio orchestras
- List of string quartet ensembles
- List of symphony orchestras
- List of symphony orchestras in Europe
- List of symphony orchestras in the United States
- List of university a cappella groups in the United Kingdom
- List of youth orchestras
- List of youth orchestras in the United States

=== Venues ===
- List of concert halls
- List of former or demolished entertainment venues in Paris
- List of opera houses
- List of theatres and auditoriums in Lisbon
- List of theatres and concert halls in Barcelona
- List of theatres and entertainment venues in Paris
- List of theatres and opera houses in Rome
- List of theatres and opera houses in Venice

=== Opera companies ===
- Lists of opera companies
- List of Latin American and South American opera companies
- List of North American opera companies
- List of opera companies in Africa and the Middle East
- List of opera companies in Asia, Australia, and Oceania
- List of opera companies in Europe

=== Educational institutions ===
- List of choir schools
- List of colleges and university schools of music in the United States
- List of music conservatories in Italy
- List of music schools in the United Kingdom

=== Miscellaneous ===
- List of classical music competitions
- List of classical music festivals
- List of choral festivals
- Early music festivals
- List of music museums
- List of opera festivals
- List of Rheingau Musik Festival locations

== Literature and media ==
- List of composers in literature
- List of fictional literature featuring opera
- List of films about pianists
- List of films based on operas
- List of films using the music of Richard Wagner
- List of general music articles in Rees's Cyclopaedia

== Musicology, theory and terminology ==
=== People ===
- List of music theorists
- List of medieval music theorists
- List of musicologists

=== Concepts ===
- Glossary of music terminology
- List of chords
- List of chord progressions
- List of Italian musical terms used in English
- List of musical scales and modes
- List of musical symbols
- List of musicology topics
- List of ornaments
- List of pipe organ stops
- List of pitch intervals
- List of tone rows and series

== Discographies ==
=== By composition ===
- A German Requiem discography
- Aida discography
- Andrea Chénier discography
- Arabella discography
- Ariadne auf Naxos discography
- Beethoven Symphony No. 3 discography
- Boris Godunov discography
- Capriccio discography
- Carmen discography
- Cavalleria rusticana discography
- Christ lag in Todes Banden, BWV 4 discography
- Christmas Oratorio discography
- Così fan tutte discography
- Der Rosenkavalier discography
- Dido and Aeneas discography
- Die Entführung aus dem Serail discography
- Die Fledermaus discography
- Die Frau ohne Schatten discography
- Discography of Bach's Magnificat
- Discography of motets by Johann Sebastian Bach
- Discography of Nielsen symphony cycles
- Discography of Sibelius symphony cycles
- Don Carlos discography
- Don Giovanni discography
- Elektra discography
- Elgar Cello Concerto discography
- Elgar Symphony No. 1 discography
- Elgar Symphony No. 2 discography
- Elgar Violin Concerto discography
- Enigma Variations discography
- Façade discography
- Falstaff discography
- Faust discography
- Fidelio discography
- Four Last Songs discography
- Gianni Schicchi discography
- Goldberg Variations discography
- Ich will den Kreuzstab gerne tragen, BWV 56 discography
- Il ritorno d'Ulisse in patria discography
- Il trovatore discography
- Iphigénie en Tauride discography
- La bohème discography
- La forza del destino discography
- La Grande-Duchesse de Gérolstein discography
- La traviata discography
- Lamento d'Arianna discography
- Les Huguenots discography
- Les nuits d'été discography
- Les Troyens discography
- L'incoronazione di Poppea discography
- Lohengrin discography
- L'Orfeo discography
- Lucia di Lammermoor discography
- Macbeth discography
- Madama Butterfly discography
- Mahler Symphony No. 4 discography
- Mahler Symphony No. 8 discography
- Mass in B minor discography
- Norma discography
- Orfeo ed Euridice discography
- Otello discography
- Pagliacci discography
- Parsifal discography
- Pelléas et Mélisande discography
- Porgy and Bess discography
- Rigoletto discography
- Rinaldo discography
- Roméo et Juliette discography
- Salome discography
- St John Passion discography
- St Matthew Passion discography
- The Art of Fugue discography
- The Barber of Seville discography
- The Dream of Gerontius discography
- The Magic Flute discography
- The Marriage of Figaro discography
- The Merry Widow discography
- The Planets discography
- The Tales of Hoffmann discography
- Tosca discography
- Tristan und Isolde discography
- Turandot discography
- Un ballo in maschera discography
- Verdi Requiem discography
- Vespro della Beata Vergine discography
- Vienna Philharmonic discography
- Wie schön leuchtet der Morgenstern, BWV 1 discography
- William Tell discography

=== By performer ===
- Ada Sari (discography)
- Alan Bush discography
- Alfred Brendel discography
- Alfredo Kraus discography
- Andrea Bocelli discography
- Angela Gheorghiu discography
- Anshel Brusilow discography
- Arthur Honegger discography
- Arthur Rubinstein discography
- Arturo Toscanini discography
- Bernard Haitink discography
- British Symphony Orchestra discography
- Carlos Kleiber discography
- Charles Munch discography
- Clare Fischer discography
- Cleveland Orchestra discography
- Daniil Trifonov discography
- Enrico Caruso compact disc discography
- Ferruccio Busoni discography
- Ferruccio Busoni discography (as pianist)
- Geoffrey Bush discography
- Georg Solti discography
- Glenn Gould discography
- György Cziffra discography
- Jessye Norman discography
- John Christopher Williams discography
- Kathleen Battle discography
- Kronos Quartet discography
- Lang Lang discography
- Los Angeles Philharmonic discography
- Malcolm Sargent discography
- Marga Schiml discography
- Nino Rota discography
- Oregon Symphony discography
- Plácido Domingo discography
- Simon Rattle discography
- Thomas Beecham selected discography
- Van Cliburn discography
- Victor de Sabata discography
- Vladimir Horowitz discography
- Westminster Cathedral Choir discography
- William Kapell discography
- Yo-Yo Ma discography
- Yundi discography

=== Miscellaneous ===
- List of Classical Artist Albums Chart number ones of the 2000s
- List of Classical Artist Albums Chart number ones of the 2010s
- List of Classical Artist Albums Chart number ones of the 2020s
- List of Specialist Classical Albums Chart number ones of the 2000s
- List of Specialist Classical Albums Chart number ones of the 2010s
- List of Specialist Classical Albums Chart number ones of the 2020s

== Other lists ==
=== Awards ===
- List of awards and nominations received by Andrea Bocelli
- List of awards and nominations received by Plácido Domingo
- Carnegie Collection of British Music
- Gramophone Classical Music Awards
- Grammy Award for Best Opera Recording
- Helpmann Award for Best Direction of an Opera
- Helpmann Award for Best Female Performer in an Opera
- Helpmann Award for Best Male Performer in an Opera
- Helpmann Award for Best Opera
- Laurence Olivier Award for Best New Opera Production
- Laurence Olivier Award for Outstanding Achievement in Opera

=== Miscellaneous ===
- Catalogues of classical compositions
- List of burial places of classical musicians
- List of Cambridge Companions to Music
- List of classical music concerts with an unruly audience response
- List of French haute-contre roles
- List of historical opera characters
- List of musical families (classical music)
- List of Innsbruck Festival of Early Music productions
- List of musical items in Claudio Monteverdi's L'Orfeo
- List of performances of French grand operas at the Paris Opéra
- List of premieres at the Metropolitan Opera
- List of Private Passions episodes (1995–1999)
- List of Private Passions episodes (2000–2004)
- List of Private Passions episodes (2005–2009)
- List of Private Passions episodes (2010–2014)
- List of Private Passions episodes (2015–2019)
- List of Private Passions episodes (2020–present)
- List of publications by Ottaviano Petrucci
- List of residences of Joseph Haydn
- List of RISM abbreviations
- Royal College of Music war memorial
- List of sculptures of Ludwig van Beethoven

== See also ==
- List of lists of lists
