= List of symphonies in A-flat minor =

The list of symphonies in A♭ minor includes:

- Arnold Bax
  - Symphony No. 7 (the key is not specified in the title; from observation, the key is A-flat minor.)
- Dimitrie Cuclin
  - Symphony No. 11 (1950)

== See also ==
- List of symphonies in G-sharp minor
