= List of compositions by Zygmunt Stojowski =

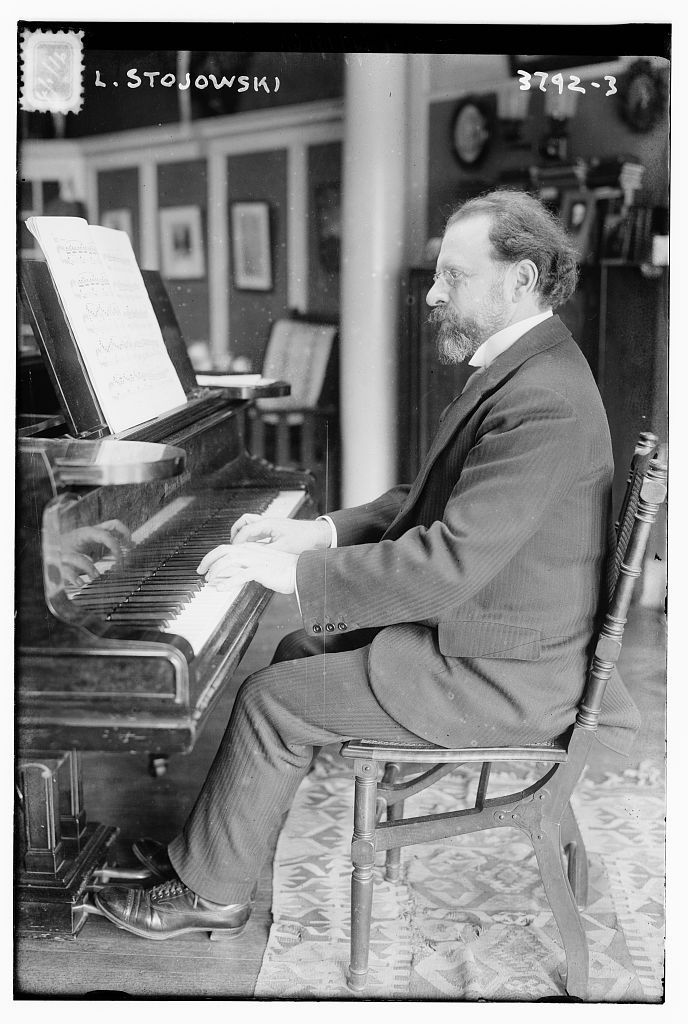
Stojowski in 1916 at his piano

This is a list of compositions by Zygmunt Stojowski.

== Piano ==
=== Piano solo ===
- Mélodie, Op. 1/1
- Prélude, Op.1/2
- Deux caprices-études, Op. 2
- Trois Intermèdes, Op. 4
- Berceuse, Op. 5/1
- Scherzo, Op. 5/2
- Gondoliera, Op. 5/3
- Mazurka, Op. 5/4
- Légende, Op. 8/1
- Mazurka, Op. 8/2
- Serenade, Op. 8/3
- Romance, Op. 10/1
- Caprice, Op. 10/2
- Polonaise, Op. 12/1
- Valse, Op. 12/2
- Mazurka, Op. 12/3
- Cracovienne, Op. 12/4
- Mazurka, Op. 12/5
- Cosaque Fantastique, Op. 12/6
- Dumka, Op. 14
- Rêverie, Op. 15/1
- Intermezzo-Mazurka, Op. 15/2
- Au Soir, Op. 15/3
- Deux Caprices, Op. 16
- Feuillet d'Album, Op. 19/1
- Moment musical, Op. 19/2
- Arabesque, Op. 19/3
- Barcarolle, Op. 19/4
- Mazurka, Op. 19/5
- Polnische Idyllen, Op. 24
- Geständnis, Op. 25/1
- En valsant, Op. 25/2
- Idylle, Op. 25/3
- Barcarolle, Op. 25/4
- Frühlingserwachen, Op. 25/5
- Mélodie, Op. 26/1
- In tempo di Minuetto, Op. 26/2
- Chant d’Amour, Op. 26/3
- Thème Cracovien Varié, Op. 26/4
- Two Mazurkas, Op. 28
- Ballade, Op. 29/1
- Aufschwung, Op. 29/2
- Zwielicht, Op. 29/3
- Cappricio, Op. 29/4
- Serenade, Op. 29/5
- Valse – Impromptu, Op. 29/6
- Amourette de Pierrot, Op. 30/1
- Feuilles mortes, Op. 30/2
- Près du ruisseau, Op. 30/3
- Trois études de concert, Op. 35
- Rêves, Op. 36/1
- Rayons et reflets, Op. 36/2
- Fleurettes, Op. 36/3
- Bruissements, Op. 36/4
- Fantaisie, Op. 38
- Aspirations, for piano, Op. 39/1: L'aspiration vers l'azur (Prélude)
- Aspirations, for piano, Op. 39/2: Vers la tombe (élégie)
- Aspirations, for piano, Op. 39/3: L'aspiration vers le caprice (Intermède)
- Aspirations, for piano, Op. 39/4: L'aspiration vers l'amour (Romance)
- Aspirations, for piano, Op. 39/5: L'aspiration vers la joie (Rhapsodie)
- Intermède lyrique, Op. 41/1
- Scherzo-caprice, Op. 41/2
- Variations et Fugue sur un thème original, Op. 42
- Romance, Op. 43/1
- Cadenza for Beethoven’s Piano Concerto No. 3 in C minor
- Deux Feuilles d’album
- Dumka

== Instrument solo ==
- Serenade for Violin Solo
- Fantaisie for Trombone

== Chamber music ==
=== Violin and piano ===
- Violin Sonata No. 1 in G major, Op. 13
- Violin Sonata No. 2 in E major, Op. 37

=== Viola and piano ===
- Fantazja (Fantasia) for viola and piano, Op. 27 (1905)

=== Cello and piano ===
- Cello Sonata in A major, Op. 18
- Fantaisie for Cello and Piano in E major, Op. 27
- Romance sans paroles in A major for Cello and Piano

=== Other ===
- Variations for two Violins, Viola and Cello, Op. 6
- Fantasy for Trombone and Piano

== Orchestral ==
=== Symphonies ===
- Symphony in D minor, Op. 21 (1893)

=== Piano and orchestra ===
- Piano Concerto No. 1 in F♯ minor, Op. 3 (1891)
- Rhapsody for Piano and Orchestra in D major, Op. 23 (1904)
- Piano Concerto No. 2 in A♭ minor (Prologue, scherzo and variations), Op. 32 (1910)

=== Violin and orchestra ===
- Romance for Violin and Orchestra in E♭ major, Op. 20 (1919)
- Violin Concerto in G minor, Op. 22 (1900)

=== Cello and orchestra ===
- Concertstuck in D major for Cello and Orchestra, Op. 31 (1915)

=== Trombone and Piano ===
- Fantasy for Trombone & Piano, Op. 27 (1905)

=== Other ===
- Suite for Orchestra in E♭ major, Op. 9 (1893)

== Choral music ==
- Le printemps, cantata for Choir and Orchestra, Op. 7
- Prayer for Poland, cantata for Soprano, baritone, chorus, orchestra and organ, Op. 40

== Mélodies ==
- Soir d'eté, Op. 11/1
- Le Soleil emplit la voute, Op. 11/2
- Pourquoi te cueillir, Op. 11/3
- Pleure mon âme, Op. 11/4
- Sur le branche l'oiseau, Op. 11/5
- Où va ton rêve?, Op. 33/1
- Parle de grâce!, Op. 33/2
- Si tu étais un lac insondable, Op. 33/3
- Comme un luth sonore, ô brise, Op. 33/4
- Adieu, Op. 33/5
- Invocation, Op. 33/6
- À Stella
- Chanson de mer
- Euphonies
- Krakowiak (Le Cracovien), En Route gai Cracovien
- La flûte muette
- Serénade
- Chansons Polonaise
- Memories of Poland
