= List of compositions by Guillaume Lekeu =

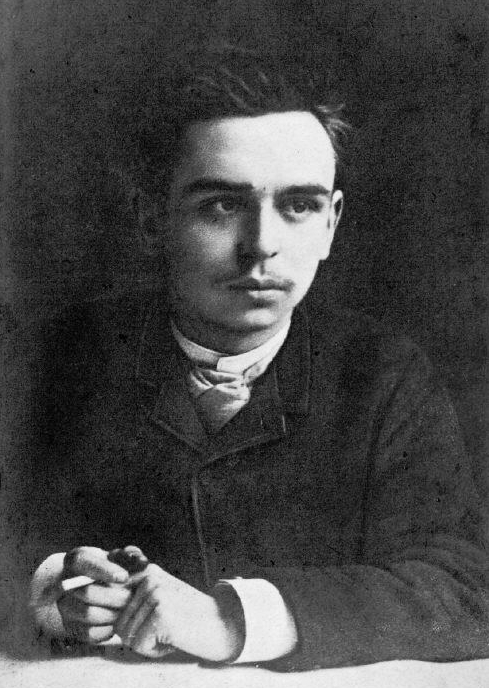
Guillaume Lekeu

This is a list of compositions by Guillaume Lekeu.

The list is initially in chronological order of composition completion date. The "V." header is clickable and doing so will sort the list by "V" numbers, which are grouped into genre and other categories, according to the 1993 catalogue by musicologist Luc Verdebout. (To return to the chronological order, reload the webpage.)

== List of compositions ==
V.	Title	Date	Scoring	Notes
57	Sonata in D minor	1885	violin, piano	unfinished, manuscript (marked "Opus 3")
44	Choral, (À mon oncle Pierre Lekeu)	1885/6-7	violin, piano	Opus 3
113	Lamento	1886/11	violin	
93	Andantino semplice, (Andantino semplice e molto espressivo)	1887/6/22	piano	
76	Les Deux bonnes sœurs	1887/8	voice, piano	Text: Charles Baudelaire; lost
78	Lied de matelot	1887/8	voice, piano	lost; completed but a manuscript of an unfinished sketch exists
77	La Fenêtre de la maison paternelle	1887/8	mezzo-soprano, piano	Text: Alphonse de Lamartine
–	Invocation à Mallarmé	1887/summer	voice, piano	Text: Stéphane Mallarmé
80	Les Pavots	1887/9	tenor/baritone, piano	Text: Alphonse de Lamartine
48	Méditation for string quartet, in G major	1887/8-9	2 violins, viola, cello	intended as 2nd mvt of a string quartet, but the other movements never written
63	String Quartet in D minor: 1. 1st mvt 2. Adagio; 3. Canzonetta; 4. Finale	1887/8-9	2 violins, viola, cello	lost; mvts 1-3 completed, 4th mvt unknown, a manuscript of sketches exists
49	Menuet	1887/9	2 violins, viola, cello	
52	Mon âme est triste jusq'à la mort (My soul is sad unto death): Molto adagio, (Molto adagio sempre cantate e doloroso)	1887/10/26	2 violins, viola, cello	Preface to a Quartet on phrases from the Bible
84	Adagio religioso, (Adagio religioso col piu grand' espressione)	1887	piano	
106	Tempo di Mazurka	1887/10	piano	
99; 96; 102; 100	Morceaux égoïstes Set 1: 1. Lamento; 2. Chant pastorale 3. Moderato poco allegro 4. Lento doloroso	1887/9; 1887/10/20; 1887/11; 1887/11/26	piano	#1 & #2 lost
58	Quatuor contrapuntique	1887/8-11	2 violins, viola, cello	planned, sketches?
95	Berceuse et Valse (pot-pourri)	1887	piano	
71	Prélude, Andantino and Tarentelle	1887	cello, piano	written for the cellist Gillet; lost
66	Thema con variazioni	1888/2/1	violin, viola, cello	
33	Adagio molto espressivo	1888/2	2 violins, piano	
60	Quatuor (String Quartet), in G major: 1. Allegretto quasi allegro 2. Adagio sostenuto 3. Capriccio; 4. Romance; 5. Poco allegro e molto scherzoso 6. Final	1888/2/15	2 violins, viola, cello	
50	Minuetto	1888/2/18	2 violins	
65	Sonate (Cello Sonata), in F major: 1. Le cœuer plein des songes funèbres (The heart full of funeral dreams): Adagio malinconico 2. It is both bitter and sweet during winter nights: Allegro molto quasi presto 3. Mater suspiriorum: Lento assai 4. You have caused me to prefer the sorrows of the night to the splendours of the day: Épilogue	1888/3	cello, piano	last few pages of last mvt are lost (though possibly it was unfinished); completed by Vincent d'Indy 1923
38	Vouloir: Andante più tosto adagio	1888/4/23	violin, piano	
85; 88; 91; 86; 87	Morceaux égoïstes Set 2: 1. Allegro marcato 2. Andante in F major 3. Andantino malinconico, a tre voci 4. Andante in A minor 5. Andante	1887/11/27; 1887/12; 1888/1/4; 1888/1/10; 1888/5/17	piano	
31	Prèlude pour le troisième acte de Phèdre	1888/9	orchestra	Text: Victor Hugo; piano reduction; lost?
2	Scene from Les Burgraves	1888/11	contralto, tenor, orchestra	Text: Victor Hugo; orchestra in a piano reduction, unknown whether it was ever orchestrated; themes later reused in orchestral work Burgraves
92	Morceau: Andante sostenuto	1889	piano 4-hands	a fantasia on a Cramignon or Walloon folk dance melody
41	Canon	1889	2 violins	
119	Étude de fugue	1889		
27	Introduction symphonique aux Burgraves, (Overture after Victor Hugo's Les Burgraves): 1. Première partie: Modéré, très solennel 2. Seconde partie 3. Troisième partie	1889/4/16	orchestra	the date is that of the 3 mvt sketch, before orchestration; the 3rd mvt was discarded and never orchestrated
103	Moderato quasi largo	1889/spring	piano	
127	Poème de religion	1889/9	orchestra	projected, never written?
–	(unknown title)	1889/9/30	chorus, orchestra	written at the request of Professor Alphonse Voncken, director of the Société Royal de l'Emulation in Verviers; lost
1	Barberine, opera	1889/12	opera	sketches, abandoned; Prélude au 2e acte completed (c.f.); themes of other sketches later used in Chant de triomphale délivrance
14	Barberine, Prélude, (Prélude au 2e acte) (Prelude to Act II of the abandoned opera Barberine)	1889/12	orchestra	
81	Quelque antique et lente danse	1889/12	soprano, piano	Text: Lekeu
79	L'ombre plus dense	1889/12	tenor, piano	Text: Lekeu
18	Chant de triomphale délivrance, Étude symphonique, (Première Étude symphonique)	1889/12–1890/early	orchestra	
23	Fantaisie contrapuntique sur un cramignon liégeois (Contrapuntal fantasy on the Liège Cramignon)	1890/3/23	chamber orchestra	with choreography for the individual musicians
19; 21; 129	Hamlet, Étude symphonique, (Deuxième Étude symphonique), (Hamlet et Ophélie): 1. Première partie: Hamlet; 2. Seconde partie: Ophélie; 3. Troisième partie: Marche funèbre	1890/8/15	orchestra; 3rd movement for chorus, orchestra	3rd movement never written; 2nd movement later revised with a different ending (c.f.)
22	Ophélie	1890/8/22	orchestra	revised version of 2nd movement of Hamlet, with a different ending intended to lead into the 3rd movement.
70	Trio pour piano, violon et violoncelle, (Trio à clavier) (Piano Trio), in C minor: 1. Lent; 2. Très lent 3. Très animé 4. Lent	1889/12–1891/1/7	piano, violin, cello	
105	Sonate (Piano Sonata), in G minor: 1. (Prélude); 2. (Fugue 1); 3. (Fugue 2); 4. Dans un mouvement plus lent 5. Finale	1891/2-3	piano	
13	Les fleurs pâles du souvenir, Adagio pour quatuor d'orchestre	1891/4/28	string orchestra (with violin solo)	published as Opus 3; arrangement of string trio Adagio?
35	Adagio	1891	violin, viola, cello	arrangement of a fragment of the string orchestra Adagio?
17	Épithalame	1891/4	organ, ensemble (orchestra of strings, 3 trombones)	
73	Chanson de Mai	1891/spring	tenor/baritone, piano	Text: Jean Lekeu
7	Chant lyrique	1891/6	chorus, orchestra	Text: Alphonse de Lamartine
3	Andromède, Poème lyrique et symphonique, Cantata, 2 acts	1891/8	soprano, tenor, baritone, and bass soloists, chorus, orchestra	Text: Jules Sauvenière; composed for the Prix de Rome (Belgium)
28	Larghetto	1892/2/3	cello, ensemble (orchestra of strings, 2 horns, bassoon)	
26	Introduction et Adagio pour tuba et orchestre d'harmonie	c.1892/2	tuba, wind orchestra	
–	Overture and Adagio	1892	brass band	arrangement of tuba/winds Introduction et Adagio?
5	Plainte d'Andromède	1892/2	soprano, piano, 2 violins, viola, cello, doublebass	arrangement of fragments of the choral/orchestral work
132	Paysage d'Ardenne	1892	violin, orchestra	planned, never written?
130	La Conquête du bonheur	1892	vocal	Text: Lekeu; planned, never written?
107	3 Pièces: 1. Chansonette sans paroles 2. Valse oubliée 3. Danse joyeuse	1892	piano	
25	Fantaisie sur deux airs populaires angevins (Fantasy on two Angers folktunes)	1892/5	orchestra	
–	Fantaisie sur deux airs populaires angevins	1892/5	piano 4-hands	reduction of orchestra work
64	Sonate pour piano et violin (Violin Sonata) in G major: 1. Très modéré 2. Très lent 3. Très animé	1892/7	violin, piano	further corrections made up to 1893/2
83	Nocturne	1892/11/17	mezzo-soprano, piano, 2 violins, viola, cello	arrangement of No. 3 of Trois Poèmes
94	Berceuse	1892/11/22	piano	
82	Trois Poèmes: 1. Sur une tombe 2. Ronde; 3. Nocturne	1892/4/7–1892/12/13	soprano/baritone, piano	Texts: Lekeu
–	Trois Poèmes	1892	soprano (unaccompanied)	arrangement of the soprano/piano work
133	La Légende éternelle	1892?		planned, never written
62	Quatuor a clavier (Piano Quartet) in B minor: 1. Dans un emportement douloureux (très animé); 2. Lent et passionné	1892/12/3–1894/1	piano, violin, viola, cello	1st mvt finished 1893/7/16, 2nd mvt unfinished; completed by Vincent d'Indy
