= List of compositions by Walter Carroll =

Walter Carroll (4 July 1869 - 9 October 1955) was an English composer, music lecturer, education lecturer and author.

This is a list of his compositions and writings (with publishers in brackets).

== Piano music ==
- 1892 – Piano Sonata in C minor (Forsyth)
- 1892 – Two Sonatinas in C and D major (Forsyth)

== Choral music ==
- 1893 – When Jesus Christ Our Lord Was Born (Curwen)
- 1899 – Single Chant in C (Bristol Tune Book)
- 1901 – Fallowfield (Hymn tune) (Sheffield Sunday School Union)
- 1902 – Magnificat and Nunc Dimittis in F (Weekes)
- 1902 – Benedicite Omnia Opera or The Song of the Three Holy Children (Weekes)
- 1903 – Chorale - Sleep Thy Last Sleep (Weekes)
- 1923 – Anthem - Sleep Thy Last Sleep (Forsyth)
- The Stars (four-part song)
- Nature (Sonnet for five voices)

== Orchestral music ==
- c. 1900 – Festive Overture
- Seascape: A Children's Suite, orchestrated by Eric Fogg.

== Educational piano music for children ==
- 1908 – First Lessons in Bach, Book 1 (Forsyth)
- 1909 – First Lessons in Bach, Book 2 (Forsyth)
- 1912 – First Piano Lessons, Book 1: Scenes at a Farm (Forsyth)
- 1913 – First Piano Lessons, Book 2: The Countryside (Forsyth)
- 1914 – Sea Idylls (Forsyth)
- 1914 – Six Easy Studies in Olden Style (Forsyth)
- 1916 – Forest Fantasies (Forsyth)
- 1919 – First Piano Lessons, Book 1a: Tunes from Nature (Forsyth)
- 1922 – In Southern Seas (Forsyth)
- 1923 – Twelve Studies (Forsyth)
- 1923 – Water Sprites (Forsyth)
- 1933 – River and Rainbow (Forsyth)
- 1937 – Four Gypsies (Ricordi)
- 1946 – The Enchanted Isle for Violin and Piano (Forsyth)
- 1953 – Four Country Dances (Forsyth)
- 1973 – The Lonely Shepherd (op. posth.) (Forsyth)

== Educational books, pamphlets and papers ==
- 1894 – Advice to Students Preparing for Examination in the Theory of Music (Heywood)
- 1904 – The Study of Music (Sherratt and Hughes)
- 1906 – Notes on Musical Form (Sherratt and Hughes)
- 1906 – The Teaching of Music (Sherratt and Hughes)
- 1907 – The Training of Music Teachers (no publisher given)
- 1912 – Notes on First Piano Lessons (Forsyth)
- 1914 – The Unfolding of Personality (Sherratt and Hughes)
- 1919 – One Hundred and Fifty Melodies for the Use of Elementary Harmony and Singing Students (Forsyth)
- 1922 – The Training of Children's Voices (Forsyth)
- 1925 – Handbook of Music (Manchester Education Committee) (Reprinted 1927; 1934)
- 1930 – Music in Manchester Schools (Manchester Education Committee)
- 1942 – The Unfolding of Personality (A Grayson, Manchester)
- 1948 – Music in Life and Education (Williams)
- 1951 – The True Story of "Scenes at a Farm" (Forsyth)
- undated – Children's Voices: The Fourteen Points of Voice Training (Forsyth)
