= List of compositions by Stefan Wolpe =

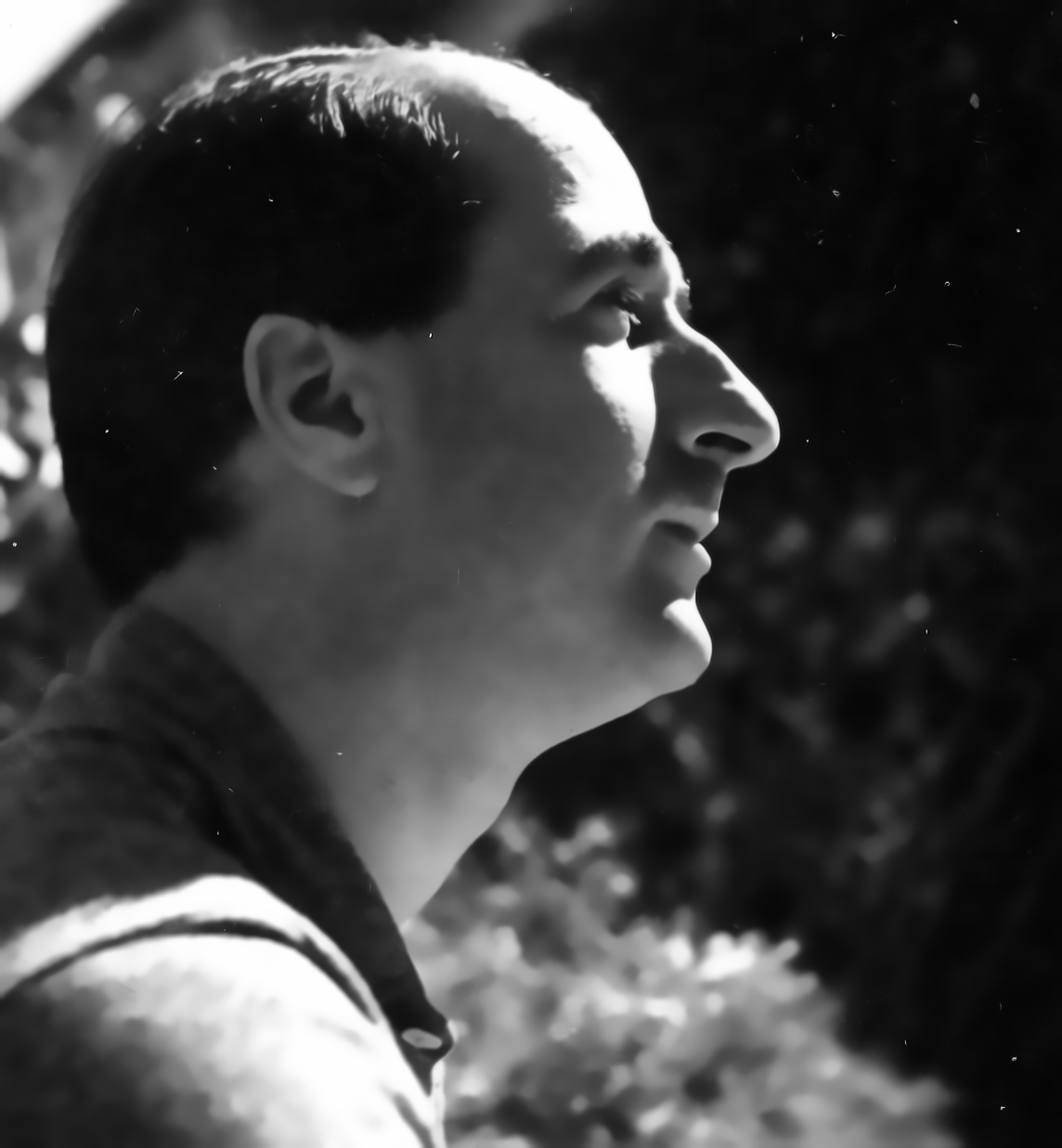
Stefan Wolpe c. 1938

A list of compositions by Stefan Wolpe. Source:

== Compositions ==
=== Orchestral works ===
- Zwei Studien für Grosses Orchester (1933)
- Passacaglia for Full Orchestra (1937)
- The Man from Midian: First Suite (1942)
- Symphony No. 1 (1956)

=== Chamber works ===
- Duo für Zwei Geigen, violin duo (1924)
- Musik zu Hamlet, flute, clarinet and cello (1929)
- Drei Kleinere Canons in der Umkehrung Zweier 12-tönig Correspondierenden Hexachorde, viola and cello (1936)
- Suite im Hexachord, oboe and clarinet (1936)
- Lied, Anrede, Hymnus, Strophe zärteste Bewegung, oboe and piano (1939)
- Sonata for Oboe and Piano (1941)
- Sonata for Violin and Piano (1949)
- Quartet for Trumpet, Tenor Saxophone, Percussion, and Piano (1950, rev. 1954)
- Twelve Pieces for String Quartet (1950)
- Piece For Oboe, Cello, Percussion, and Piano (1955)
- Quintet with Voice, baritone, clarinet, horn, cello, harp, piano (1957)
- Piece in Two Parts for Flute and Piano (1960)
- Piece for Piano and Sixteen Instruments (1961)
- In Two Parts for Six Players, clarinet, trumpet, violin, cello, harp, piano (1962)
- Piece for Two Instrumental Units, large mixed ensemble (1963)
- Chamber Piece No. 1, chamber orchestra (1964)
- Trio in Two Parts, flute, cello and piano (1964)
- Piece in Two Parts for Violin Alone (1964)
- Second Piece for Violin Alone (1966)
- Solo Piece for Trumpet (1966)
- Chamber Piece No. 2, chamber orchestra (1967)
- From Here On Farther, mixed quartet (1969)
- String Quartet (1969)
- Piece for Trumpet and Seven Instruments (1971)

=== Piano works ===
- Adagio (1920)
- Gesang: Weil Ich Etwas Teures Verlassen Muss (1920)
- Vier Adagien (1920)
- Drei Klavierstücke (1923)
- Early Piece for Piano (1925)
- Stehende Musik (1925)
- Rag-Caprice (1927)
- Tango (1927)
- Presto agitato (1929)
- Tanz (Charleston) (1929)
- March and Variations for Two Pianos (1933)
- Cinq Marches Caracteristiques (1928–1934)
- Zärtliche Addresse an Irmas 32 Geburtstag (1934)
- Four Studies on Basic Rows (1936)
- Dance in the Form of a Chaconne (1939)
- Pastoral (1941)
- Toccata in Three Parts for Piano (1941)
- Zemach Suite (1941)
- The Good Spirit of a Right Cause (1942)
- The Man from Midian (1942)
- Battle Piece (1943–1947)
- Two Studies for Piano, Part II (1948)
- Music for Any Instruments: Interval Studies (1944–1949)
- Music for a Dancer (1950)
- Seven Pieces for Three Pianos (1951)
- Waltz for Merle (1952)
- Enactments for Three Pianos (1953)
- Form for Piano (1959)
- Form IV: Broken Sequences (1969)
- Fuge a 3 (undated)
- Invention: Canon (undated)

=== Chamber operas ===
- Zeus und Elida: A Musical Grotesque (1928)
- Schöne Geschichten (1927–1929)

=== Cantatas ===
- Cantata vom Sport, unision chorus and ensemble (1932)
- Yigdal, baritone, SATB, organ (1945)
- Lazy Andy Ant, singer/narrator, two pianos (1947)
- Street Music: A Counter-offering to the Musical Offerings of Ten Composers on my 60th Birthday, baritone, narrator, flute, oboe, clarinet, cello, piano (1962)
- Cantata for Mezzo-soprano, Three Women's Voices, and Instruments (1963)

=== Incidental Music ===
- Schattenspiel-Musik, soprano, mezzo-soprano, alto (1923)
- Da Leigt der Hund Begraben, voices, trumpet, saxophone, percussion, piano (1932)
- La Malade imaginaire, flute, clarinet, violin, viola, double-bass (1934)
- Palestine, flute, violin, viola, cello, piano (1941)
- The Good Woman of Setzuan, voices, piano (1953)
- Peer Gynt, voices, piano (1954)
- King Oedipus: Music of Introduction and Setting the frame to the choruses, speakers, piano (1957)
- The Hour Glass, voice, piano (1958)
- The Tempest, chamber ensemble (1960)
- The Exception and the Rule, voices, trumpet, clarinet, bassoon, percussion, piano (1961)

=== Songs ===
- Früheste Lieder (1920)
- Fünf Lieder von Friedrich Hölderlin, mezzo-soprano or alto (1924, 1927, rev. 1936)
- Drei Lieder Nach Heinrich von Kleist, soprano (1925)
- Neun Vertonungen aus Gitanjali von Rabindranath Tagore, alto (1926)
- Zwei Fabeln für Bariton und Klavier (1926)
- Ja Wohl Es Muss die Ehrlichkeit (1928)
- An Anna Blume von Kurt Schwitters, tenor (1929)
- Blues, speaker, 2 saxophones, trumpet, percussion, 2 pianos (1929)
- Decret No. 2 an die Armee der Künstler, soprano (1929)
- Fantasie von Übermorgen, medium voice (1929)
- Zwei Lieder von Lenin und Weh, medium voice (1929)
- Auch die Kleinste Tat, pianist-speaker (1930
- Politische Satiren, medium voice (1929–1930)
- Drei Arbeitslieder, medium voice (1929–1930)
- Acht Lieder auf Texte von Heine, Ottwald, Weinert, und Anderen, medium voice (1929–1930)
- Agitprop Lieder, medium voice (1931)
- Zwei Lieder von Ernst Ottwald, medium voice (1931)
- Proletarische Selbstkritik, medium voice (1932)
- Simple Songs for the People, medium voice (1929–1932)
- Agitprop Lieder (1930–1933)
- We Are One Driven Tortured Flock, baritone (1935)
- Ssim Shalom (1936)
- Three Songs for Medium Voice and Piano (1936)
- Ve Hinehu, medium voice (1936?)
- Two Songs for Alto and Piano from The Song of Songs (1937)
- Vier Lieder für Alt oder Bariton und Klavier (1938)
- Epitaph, low voice (1938)
- Four Songs (1934–38)
- If It Be My Fate, low voice (1938)
- La-Menatzeach al Ha-Mecholot (To the Dancemaster), mezzo-soprano, clarinet, piano (1938)
- Six Songs from the Hebrew (1936–1938, 1954)
- Zwei Lieder für Bass und Klavier (1938)
- Two Songs of Bialik (1938–1939)
- Psalm 64 and Isaiah Chapter 35, soprano (1940)
- Simple Music with Definitely Political Intentions for piano, band, or any other instrumental combination (1942)
- Drei Lieder von Bertolt Brecht, alto (1943)
- *Zwei Lieder aus Gedichte von Berthold Viertel, medium voice (1945)
- Excerpts from Dr. Einstein's Address about Peace in the Atomic Era, medium voice (1950)
- Apollo and Artemis, medium voice (1955)
- The Angel, medium voice (1959)
- Music for Medium Voice and Piano (1959)
- Singables, medium voice (1959)
- Under Green and Gold Step the Pioneer Bold (C.W. Post college song) (1959)
- Täglich Schüttet Früh und Spät (undated)

=== Choral works ===
- Prolog fur Troilus und Cressida, SATB, cornet, trombone (1929)
- Bauernlied, unison chorus (1930)
- Ballade von Karl Schmidt aus der Grauen Stadt, unison chorus, piano (1930)
- Tsedaktem Habonim Hatseirim (You Were Right), SATB (1936)
- Songs from Ballad of the Unknown Soldier, SATB (1937)
- Two Chinese Epitaphs for Mixed Chorus and Drums (1937)
- Bim Komotenu (We Have a Court of Justice), SATB (1938)
- Shir Hanapach (Song of the Blacksmith), SATB (1938)
- Two Choral Songs, soprano, alto (1944)
- Three Pieces for Mixed Chorus with Words from the Bible and a Piece by Gershon Shofman, SATB (1954)
- The Way A Crow, SATB (1958)
- All-Wielding God, SATB, chamber ensemble (1959)
- To a Theater New, low voice, SATB, piano or guitar (1961)
- When Evening Falls (C. W. Post college song), SATB (undated)
