= List of compositions by Mauro Giuliani =

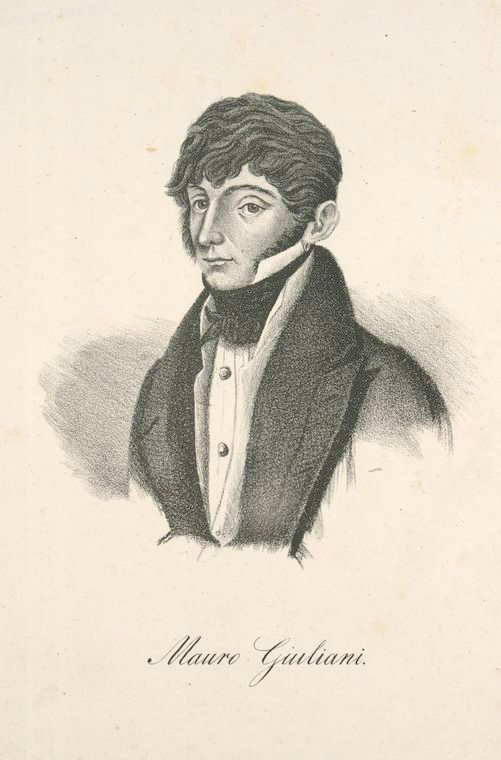
Mauro Giuliani

The works composed by Mauro Giuliani are:

Title	Opus	Instrumentation	Date
Metodo	1	guitar	1812
Variazioni	2	guitar	1810
Tre Rondò	3	guitar	1811
Variazioni	4	guitar	1810
Rondò	5	guitar	1810
Variazioni	5	guitar	1815
Variazioni	6	guitar	1828
Variazioni	7	guitar	1807
Tre Rondò	8	guitar	1826
Variazioni	9	guitar	1810
Divertimenti	10	guitar	1826
Capriccio	11	guitar	1810
Dodici Monferrine	12	guitar	1825
Tre Romanze	13	voice & guitar	
Sei Rondò	14	guitar	1811
Sonata	15	guitar	1812
Raccolta	16	guitar	1810
Sedici Ländler	16	two guitars	1811
Tre Rondò	17	guitar	1813
Pot Pourri	18	guitar	1808
Tre Rondò	18	guitar	
Serenata	19	violin, cello & guitar	1810
Variazioni	20	guitar	1810
Dodici Valzer	21	guitar	1811
Tre Romanze	22	voice & guitar or pianoforte	1810
Dodici Valzer	23	guitar	1811
Variazioni	24	violin & guitar	1811
Duo Concertante	25	violin & guitar	
Pot Pourri	26	guitar	1810
Romanza	27	voice & guitar or pianoforte	1811
Pot Pourri	28	guitar	1811
Divertimenti	29	guitar	1828
Concerto Mvt 3: polonaise	30	guitar & orchestra	1812
Pot Pourri	31	guitar	1811
Variazioni	32	guitar	1810
Dodici Scozzesi	33	guitar	
Variazioni	34	guitar	1810
Grandi Variazioni Concertanti	35	two guitars	
Gran Concerto	36	guitar & orchestra	1812
Gran Concerto	36	guitar & pianoforte	1824
Divertimenti	37	guitar	
Variazioni	38	guitar	1812
Sei Cavatine	39	voice & guitar	
Divertimenti	40	guitar	1816
Aria Variata	41	guitar	1812
Pot Pourri	42	guitar	1811
Raccolta	43	guitar	1813
Dodici Ländler	44	guitar	1811
Variazioni	45	guitar	1811
Raccolta	46	guitar	1812
Variazioni	47	guitar	1812
Ventiquattro Studi	48	guitar	1811
Variazioni	49	guitar	1813
Le Papillon	50	guitar	
Ventotto Lezioni Progressive	51	guitar	
Gran Duetto Concertante	52	flute or violin & guitar	1812
Grande Pot Pourri	53	flute or violin & guitar	
Raccolta	54	guitar	1816
Dodici Ländler	55	guitar	
Divertimenti	56	guitar	1817
Dodici Valzer	57	guitar	1817
Sei Ländler, Sei Valzer, Sei Scozzesi	58	guitar	1820
Raccolta	59	guitar	1822
Variazioni	60	guitar	
Grande Ouverture	61	guitar	1809
Raccolta	61	guitar	1820
Variazioni	62	guitar	1812
Variazioni	63	violin & guitar	
Variazioni	64	guitar	1808
Gran Quintetto	65	two violins, viola, cello & guitar	1812
Tre Rondò	66	guitar	1817
Tre Rondò	66	two guitars	1828
Grande Pot Pourri	67	two guitars	
Pot Pourri	67	guitar & pianoforte	1818
Due Rondò	68	guitar & pianoforte	1820
Raccolta	69	two guitars	
Gran Concerto	70	guitar & orchestra	1822
Gran Concerto	70	guitar & pianoforte	1824
Tre Sonatine	71	guitar	1810
Variazioni	72	guitar	1810
Bagatelle	73	guitar	1810
Raccolta	74	flute or violin & guitar	1810
Dodici Ländler	75	two guitars	1810
Venti Ländler	75	flute or violin & guitar	1810
Pot Pourri	76	flute or violin & guitar	1817
Duettino	77	flute or violin & guitar	1815
Divertimenti	78	guitar	
Cavatina	79	voice & guitar or pianoforte	1807
Dodici Valzer	80	guitar	
Variazioni	81	flute or violin & guitar	1819
Grande Serenata	82	flute or violin & guitar	1822
Sei Preludi	83	guitar	1817
Variazioni	84	flute or violin & guitar	1817
Gran Duetto Concertante	85	flute or violin & guitar	1817
Diciotto Divertimenti	86	flute or violin & guitar	1815
Variazioni Brillanti	87	guitar	1815
Grandi Variazioni	88	guitar	
Sei Lieder	89	soprano & guitar	
Grandi Variazioni	91	guitar	
Grande Pot Pourri	92	guitar & pianoforte	1818
Grande Pot Pourri	93	guitar & pianoforte	1821
Dodici Ländler	94	two guitars	1814
Sei Ariette	95	voice & guitar or pianoforte	1816
Tre Sonate Brillanti	96	guitar	
Variazioni	97	guitar	1820
Studi	98	guitar	1819
Variazioni	99	guitar	1825
Studi	100	guitar	
Variazioni	101	guitar	1819
Variazioni	102	guitar	1825
Variazioni	103	guitar	1819
Variazioni	104	guitar & pianoforte	
Variazioni	105	guitar	1815
Cinque Divertimenti	106	guitar	1818
Variazioni su un tema di Handel "The Harmonious Blacksmith"	107	guitar	1828
Pot Pourri	108	guitar	1825
Gran Rondò	109	guitar	1825
Marcia Variata	110	guitar	1828
Raccolta	111	guitar	1827
Variazioni	112	guitar	1825
Fughetta	113	guitar	1829
Variazioni	114	guitar	1829
Dieci Valzer	116	two guitars	
Variazioni	118	guitar	1821
Rossiniana	119	guitar	1820
Rossiniana	120	guitar	1821
Rossiniana	121	guitar	1821
Rossiniana	122	guitar	1824
Rossiniana	123	guitar	1824
Rossiniana	124	guitar	1828
Sei Arie Nazionali Irlandesi	125	guitar	1825
Serenata	127	flute or violin & guitar	1827
Variazioni Concertanti	130	two guitars	
Tre Polonesi Concertanti	137	two guitars	
Variazioni	138	guitar	1828
Ventiquattro Lezioni	139	guitar	
Variazioni	140	guitar	
Variazioni	141	guitar	
Variazioni	142	guitar	
Variazioni	143	guitar	
Quattro Variazioni e Finale	144	guitar	
Variazioni	145	guitar	
Variazioni	146	guitar	1828
Variazioni	147	guitar	
Giulianate	148	guitar	
Pastorale	149	two voices, flute & guitar	
Gran Sonata Eroica	150	guitar	
Allegro Cantabile		guitar	1829
Canzonetta		voice & guitar or pianoforte	1820
Cavatina		guitar	
Cavatina		guitar	1829
Cavatina		voice & guitar	
Dodici Controdanze		guitar	1828
Due Rondoncini		guitar	1828
Duettino		guitar	1828
Gran Duo Concertante		guitar & pianoforte	
Grandi Variazioni e Polonese		guitar & pianoforte	1825
Marcia		guitar	1824
Marcia		guitar	1828
Ouverture		guitar	1820
Raccolta		voice & guitar	
Raccolta di Valzer		guitar	1828
Riduzione d'Opera		guitar	
Rondò e Valzer		guitar	1828
Rondoncino Brillante		guitar	
Rondoncino e Due Valzer		guitar	1828
Seconda Polonese		flute or violin & guitar	1816
Sei Arie Nazionali Scozzesi		guitar	
Sei Controdanze		guitar	1828
Sinfonia		two guitars	
Sinfonia		two guitars	
Sinfonia		two guitars	
Sinfonia		guitar	
Sinfonia		two guitars	
Sinfonia		guitar	1825
Sinfonia		guitar	1827
Tarantella		two guitars	
Tre Rondò		guitar	1828
Tre Sonatine		guitar	1828
Variazioni		guitar	
Guitars of Seville		guitar & pianoforte	1781–1829
