= List of compositions by Geoffrey Bush =

The British composer Geoffrey Bush wrote music across a range of genres, including orchestral, chamber, keyboard, choral works, and a large number of songs. The following is a chronological list of his compositions, from a career that lasted from his student days in the late 1930s until the 1990s.

== List of works ==
| Year | Genre | Title | Musical forces | Recordings | Notes |
|---|---|---|---|---|---|
| 1938 | Choral | Te Deum | Choir, organ | | |
| 1939 | Orchestral | A Little Concerto (on themes of Arne) | Piano, string orchestra | | |
| 1939 | Orchestral | Natus est Immanuel | String orchestra | Lyrita SRCD341 | Revised 1954 |
| 1940 | Orchestral | Rhapsody for clarinet and strings | Clarinet, string orchestra | SOMM 0727 | Also versions for piano & strings and clarinet/horn/strings |
| 1940 | Chamber | Two Epigrams for viola, clarinet and piano | Viola, Clarinet, Piano | | 1. To Watson Forbes. 2. To the old man on the fence. |
| 1941 | Orchestral | Overture: The Spanish Rivals | Full orchestra | | |
| 1942 | Choral | Portraits: Thomas Morley; Henry Lawes; Giles Farnaby; Pan | Unaccompanied choir | | |
| 1943 | Orchestral | Divertimento | String orchestra | | |
| 1943 | Orchestral | Sinfonietta Concertante | Cello, orchestra | Lyrita SRCD341 | |
| 1943 | Orchestral | Overture: The Rehearsal | Full orchestra | | |
| 1944 | Vocal | Song: Now The Lusty Spring Is Seen | Voice, piano | | |
| 1944 | Vocal | Song: Weep You No More Sad Fountains | Voice, piano | | |
| 1944 | Vocal | Song cycle: Five Spring Songs | Voice, piano | Lyrita SRCD343 | |
| 1945 | Chamber | Sonata for violin & piano | Violin, piano | Lyrita SRCD360 | |
| 1946 | Keyboard | Four pieces for piano | Piano | Ismeron JMSCD3 | |
| 1947 | Choral | Christmas Cantata | Solo voices, choir, oboe and orchestra | Saydisc CDSDL352 | Also version for oboe and piano accompaniment |
| 1947 | Keyboard | Nocturne and Toccata | Piano | Ismeron JMSCD3 | |
| 1948 | Orchestral | Concerto for oboe and strings | Oboe, string orchestra | Barbirolli Society SJB104546 | |
| 1948 | Orchestral | Two miniatures | String orchestra | Lyrita SRCD341 | |
| 1948 | Choral | Summer Serenade | Tenor solo, chorus, piano and orchestra | | |
| 1948 | Vocal | Three Elizabethan Songs | Voice and piano | | Fire!Fire! - T. Campion; Sigh no more, ladies- Shakespeare; Sweet, stay awhile - J.Donne |
| 1949 | Vocal | Song cycle: Four Songs from the Hesperides | Solo baritone, orchestra | | |
| 1949 | Orchestral | Overture: Yorick | Full orchestra | Lyrita SRCD252; Lyrita SRCD2337 | |
| 1949 | Keyboard | An Oxford Scherzo | Two pianos | | |
| 1949 | Orchestral | Martini Fantasy | Solo violin, string orchestra | | |
| 1950 | Choral | Portraits: Orpheus | Unaccompanied choir | | |
| 1950 | Vocal | Song cycle: Farewell Earth's Bliss | Baritone and string orchestra | Atma ACD22701 | Alternative version: baritone with small strings ensemble |
| 1951 | Vocal | Song: She Hath an Eye | Voice and piano | | |
| 1951 | Vocal | Song: Fain Would I Change That Note | Voice and piano | | |
| 1951 | Choral | Music When Soft Voices Die | Choir | | |
| 1951 | Chamber | Three Dance Variations | Harpsichord and piano | Prima Facie PFCD048 | |
| 1951 | Choral | Twelfth Night: An Entertainment | Tenor, chorus and chamber orchestra | | |
| 1952 | Keyboard | Epigrams | Piano | Ismeron JMSCD3 | |
| 1952 | Opera | The Blind Beggar's Daughter | Voices and orchestra | | Ballad opera for children, revised 1964 |
| 1952 | Vocal | Three Songs of Ben Jonson | Voice and piano | Lyrita SRCD343; Naxos 8571378; Chandos CHAN8830 | |
| 1952 | Chamber | Trio for oboe, bassoon and piano | Oboe, bassoon, piano | MSR Classics MS1597 | |
| 1953 | Orchestral | Concertino No. 1 | Piano and orchestra | | |
| 1954 | Orchestral | Symphony No. 1 | Full orchestra | Lyrita SRCD252 | |
| 1954 | Vocal | Song: My True Love Hath My Heart | Voice and piano | | |
| 1954 | Vocal | Song: Introspection: If You Go Deep Into the Heart | Voice and piano | | |
| 1954 | Vocal | Song: Far-darting Apollo | Voice and piano | | Kathleen Raine, see End of Love |
| 1954 | Vocal | Lament: Where Are Those Dazzling Hills | Voice and piano | | |
| 1954 | Vocal | There is a Garden in her face | Voice and piano | | Words by Thomas Campion |
| 1955 | Keyboard | Toccata for organ | Organ | | |
| 1955 | Vocal | Song: When Daffodils Begin To Peer | Voice and piano | | |
| 1955 | Keyboard | Carillon for organ | Organ | | |
| 1955 | Choral | In Praise of Mary | Soprano, chorus and orchestra | Heritage HTGCD151 | |
| 1956 | Choral | O Love How Deep How Broad How High | Choir and organ | | |
| 1956 | Choral | It Was a Lover and His Lass | Unaccompanied choir | | |
| 1956 | Choral | Praise the Lord O My Soul | Choir and organ | | |
| 1956 | Opera | If The Cap Fits | Voices and orchestra | | |
| 1956 | Vocal | Though Cause for Suspicion Appears | Voice and piano | | from Thomas Linley's The duenna, words by Richard Brinsley Sheridan, music arr. by Geoffrey Bush |
| 1957 | Orchestral | Symphony No. 2 (The Guildford) | Full orchestra | Lyrita SRCD252 | |
| 1957 | Orchestral | Matthew Locke Suite ("Psyche") | Piano and string orchestra | Lyrita SRCD341 | |
| 1958 | Orchestral | Concerto for Light Orchestra | Full orchestra | Lyrita SRCD341 | |
| 1958 | Vocal | Softly Lulling, Sweetly Thrilling | Voice and piano | | from James Hook's Wilmore Castle, words by Houlton, music arr. Bush |
| 1958 | Vocal | By The Beer As Brown As a Berry | Voice and piano | | from J. F. Lampe's Dragon of Wantley, words by Henry Carey, music arr. Bush. |
| 1959 | Vocal | The Little Nut Tree | Voice and piano | | |
| 1959 | Vocal | Songs of Wonder | Voice and piano | Chandos CHAN8830 | Alt. version with strings accompaniment |
| 1960 | Chamber | Dialogue for oboe and piano | Oboe and piano | | |
| 1961 | Choral | Four Simple Songs: The Sweet Season | Unaccompanied choir | Lyrita SRCD343 | |
| 1961 | Vocal | A Lover's Progress | Tenor, clarinet and oboe | | |
| 1961 | Choral | Spring, The Sweet Spring | Unaccompanied choir | | |
| 1961 | Keyboard | Whydah Variations | Piano | Ismeron JMSCD3 | |
| 1961 | Vocal | Song: It Was A Lover And His Lass | Voice and piano | Two Pianists TP1039077 | |
| 1961 | Choral | How Should I Your True Love Know? | Unaccompanied choir | | |
| 1962 | Chamber | Homage to Matthew Locke | 3 trumpets, 3 trombones | | |
| 1962 | Chamber | Air and Round-O | Clarinet, French horn, flute, oboe | | Arranged from Homage to Matthew Locke |
| 1962 | Orchestral | Concerto for trumpet, piano & strings | Trumpet, piano, string orchestra | Lyrita REAM1131 | |
| 1962 | Vocal | Song: I Saw a Peacock | Voice and piano | | |
| 1963 | Choral | Two Latin hymns: O Salutaris hostia; Tantum ergo | Unaccompanied choir | | |
| 1963 | Chamber | Wind Quintet | Bassoon, clarinet, flute, French horn, oboe | | |
| 1964 | Orchestral | Finale for a Concert | Full orchestra | Lyrita SRCD341 | |
| 1964 | Orchestral | Two fragments from The Merchant of Venice: Fanfare and March, the Prince of Morocco | Full orchestra | | |
| 1964 | Choral | Tell Me Where is Fancy Bred | Choir, soprano, tenor, cello | | |
| 1964 | Vocal | Greek Love Songs | Baritone and piano | Lyrita SRCD343; Chandos CHAN8830 | |
| 1965 | Keyboard | Sonatina No. 1 | Piano | Ismeron JMSCD3 | |
| 1965 | Choral | Cantata Piccola | Baritone, choir, piano and strings | | |
| 1967 | Opera | The Equation - Musical drama | Voices and orchestra | | |
| 1967 | Orchestral | Music for Orchestra | Full orchestra | Lyrita SRCD252 | |
| 1969 | Choral | A Menagerie | Choir | | |
| 1969 | Choral | Magnificat and Nunc Dimittis | Choir and organ | OxRecs OXCD130 | |
| 1969 | Choral | Missa Brevis (Salisburiensis) | Choir, organ | | short Communion service |
| 1970 | Vocal | Five Medieval Lyrics | Voice and piano | Lyrita SRCD343 | |
| 1970 | Choral | Seven Limericks | Two-part Choir and small orchestra | | Words chiefly from Edward Lear. London, Novello |
| 1971 | Choral | A Nice Derangement of Epitaphs | Choir | | |
| 1972 | Opera | Lord Arthur Savile's Crime | Voices and orchestra | Lyrita REAM1131 | |
| 1973 | Orchestral | Concertino No. 2 | Piano & chamber orchestra | | |
| 1974 | Choral | Three Songs: Dafydd in Love | Baritone, choir, piano | | |
| 1976 | Vocal | Song cycle: A Little Love Music | Soprano and tenor voices | Chandos CHAN8830 | |
| 1977 | Choral | Gabriel of High Degree | Choir and organ | | |
| 1977 | Choral | Advent Carol: Twas in the Year that King Uzziah Died | Choir and organ | | |
| 1978 | Choral | "Phantoms" | Choir and small orchestra | | |
| 1978 | Choral | Holy Innocents | Choir, percussion and piano | | |
| 1979 | Vocal | Sigh No More, Ladies | Voice and piano | Collect CHAN6653 | |
| 1981 | Vocal | Stevie Smith songs | Tenor, piano, cello, oboe | Lyrita SRCD343 | |
| 1981 | Keyboard | Trumpet March | Organ | Priory PRDVD8; Priory PRCD6006 | |
| 1982 | Vocal | Cuisine Provençale | Soprano and piano | Naxos 8571378 | |
| 1982 | Choral | Daystar in Winter | Choir and organ | | |
| 1982 | Chamber | Pavanes and Galliards wind quintet | | | |
| 1984 | Vocal | Love for Such a Cherry Lip | soprano and piano | Naxos 8571378 | |
| 1984 | Choral | Two Legends | Choir, organ, piano | | |
| 1984 | Vocal | Venus and Adonis | Piano and voice | | |
| 1985 | Vocal | Mirabile Misterium (A Great and Mighty Wonder) | Voice and piano | Naxos 8571378 | Alt. version with strings, harpsichord and piano accompaniment |
| 1986 | Chamber | Tributes | Clarinet and piano | | |
| 1987 | Vocal | Four Chaucer Settings | Voice, oboe and piano | | |
| 1987 | Orchestral | Music for Orchestra | | | |
| 1988 | Opera | Love's Labours Lost | | | |
| 1988 | Opera | The Cat Who Went to Heaven | Voices, chorus, wind orchestra and piano | | |
| 1989 | Orchestral | Consort music | String orchestra | Naxos 8555068 | Dedicated to Roderick Swanston |
| 1989 | Vocal | Songs of the Zodiac | Voice and piano | | |
| 1990 | Vocal | Cradle Song | Soprano and piano | | |
| 1990 | Vocal | Yesterday | Soprano and piano | Naxos 8571378 | |
| 1990 | Keyboard | Suite Champêtre | Piano | Ismeron JMSCD3 | |
| 1991 | Choral | A Little Triptych for a Birthday | Choir | | |
| 1994 | Vocal | Song cycle: Archy at the Zoo | Soprano and piano | Naxos 8571378 | |
| n.d. | Vocal | The End of Love | Baritone and piano | Lyrita SRCD343; Chandos CHAN8830 | text by Kathleen Raine |
| n.d. | Choral | I Saw Three Ships (carol) | Choir and organ | | |
| n.d. | Orchestral | Overture: The Miller and his Men | Chamber orchestra | | |
| n.d. | Vocal | Three Songs from The Ballad Operas | Baritone and orchestra | | |
| n.d. | Choral | Castle Gordon | Choir | | |
| n.d. | Vocal | Merciless Beauty | Baritone and piano | Lyrita SRCD343 | |
| n.d. | Choral | Psalm 24 | Choir | | |
| n.d. | Keyboard | Novelette | Piano | Ismeron JMSCD3 | |
| n.d. | Keyboard | Sonatina | Piano | Ismeron JMSCD3 | |
| n.d. | Keyboard | Matthew's Tunes | Piano | Ismeron JMSCD3 | |
| n.d. | Keyboard | Rudi's Blues | Piano | Ismeron JMSCD3 | |

== Sources ==
- "Geoffrey Bush: Compositions". AllMusic.
- "Geoffrey Bush". British Music Collection. 4 April 2009.
- "Composers: Geoffrey Bush". Music Sales Classical.
- "Geoffrey Bush 1920–1998". Classical Archives.
- "Complete Piano Works by Geoffrey Bush". Ismeron.
- Miller, Malcolm (2001). "Bush, Geoffrey". Grove Music Online. doi:10.1093/gmo/9781561592630.article.04433. ISBN 978-1-56159-263-0. (subscription required)
- "Bush G. Composer". Presto Classical.
