= List of compositions by Robert Moevs =

This is a list of compositions by Robert Moevs. Sources:

== Compositions ==
=== Orchestral works ===
- Passacaglia (1941)
- Endymion (1948)
- Introduction and Fugue (1949)
- Overture (1950)
- Fourteen Variations (1952)
- Three Symphonic Pieces (1954–55)
- Concerto Grosso, piano, percussion, and orchestra (1960)
- Main-Travelled Roads (1973)
- Prometheus (Music for Small Orchestra, I) (1980)
- Pandora (Music for Small Orchestra, II) (1983)
- Symphonic Piece No. 5 (1984)
- Symphonic Piece No. 6 (1986)

=== Chamber works ===
- Spring, four violins and trumpets (1950)
- Duo for oboe and English horn (1953)
- String Quartet No. 1 (1957)
- Variazioni sopra una melodia, viola and cello (1961)
- In Festivitate, wind instruments and percussion (1962)
- Musica da camera I, chamber ensemble (1965)
- Fanfara canonica, six herald trumpets (1966)
- Musica da camera II, chamber ensemble (1972)
- Trio, violin, cello, piano (1980)
- Three Pieces, violin and piano (1982)
- Woodwind Quintet, flute, oboe, clarinet, bassoon, horn (1987)
- Dark Litany, wind ensemble (1988)
- String Quartet No. 2 (1989)
- Musica da Camera III: Daphne, chamber ensemble (1992)
- String Quartet No. 3 (1996)
- Musica da Camera IV, chamber ensemble (1997)
- Musica da Camera V, chamber ensemble (2000)

=== Works for solo instruments ===
- Pan, solo flute (1951)
- The Past Revisited, solo violin (1956)
- Heptachron, solo cello (1969)
- B-A-C-H, Es ist genug, solo organ (1970)
- Crystals, solo flute (1979)
- Postlude, solo organ (1980)
- Saraband, solo harpsichord (1986)
- Echo, solo guitar (1994)

=== Piano works ===
- Sonatina (1946–1947)
- Sonata (1950)
- Fantasia sopra un motivo (1951)
- Phoenix (1971)
- Ludi Praeteriti: Games of the Past, two pianos (1976)
- Una collana musicale (1977)
- Triad, two pianos (1988)
- Pentachronon (1994)
- Rondo (1996)

=== Cantatas ===
- Cantata Sacra, baritone solo, men's chorus, flute, 4 trombones, timpani (1952)
- Attis, tenor solo, mixed chorus, percussion, and orchestra (1958)
- Ode to an Olympic Hero, voice and orchestra (1963)
- Attis, Part II (1963)
- The Aulos Player, soprano solo, 2 choruses, 2 organs (1975)

=== Songs ===
- Youthful Song, voice and piano (1940)
- Villanelle, voice and piano (1950)
- Time, mezzo soprano and piano (1969)
- Epigram, voice and piano (1978)
- Two Songs from Sappho, voice and piano (1995)
- Six Songs on Poems by Ungaretti, voice and piano (1995)
- The Ballad of Angel Lynn, voice and piano (1998)

=== Choral works ===
- Great Nations of This Earth, women's chorus a cappella (1942)
- The Bacchantes, mixed chorus a cappella (1947)
- Itaque Ut, chorus a cappella (1959)
- Et Nunc, Reges, women's chorus, flute, clarinet, bass clarinet (1963)
- Et Occidentem Illustra, chorus and orchestra (1964)
- Ave Maria, a cappella chorus (1966)
- Alleluia for Michaelmas, organ and congregation (1967)
- A Brief Mass, chorus, organ, vibraphone, guitar, double bass (1968)

=== Other ===
- Piece for Synket, electronic music (1969)
- Paths and Ways, saxophone and dancer (1970)
- Conun*drum, percussion quintet (1995)
