= List of compositions by Dane Rudhyar =

This is a list of compositions by Dane Rudhyar.

== Compositions ==
=== Orchestral works ===
- Trois Poëmes Ironiques (1914–1919)
- Vision Végétale (1914–1919)
- Four Symphonic Poems (For Métachorie) (1914–1919)
- Dithyrambs (1919)
- Soul Fire (1920)
- Unfoldment (1920)
- Syntony #1 (From the Unreal Lead Us to the Real), a symphonic trilogy (1919–1921)
- The Warrior, a tone poem for piano and orchestra (1920)
- The Surge of Fire (Symphonic Trilogy), for small orchestra (1921–1923)
- Five Stanzas, for string orchestra (1926)
- The Human Way (1927)
- Ouranos, for chamber orchestra (1927)
- Sinfonietta, transcribed from a piano sonatina (1928, rev 1979)
- Threnody (1929)
- Hero Chant (1930)
- Desert Chant (1932)
- Eclogue (1934)
- Epithalamium (1934)
- Threshold of Light (1934)
- Emergence, for string orchestra (1948)
- Triphong (1948, rev 1977)
- Dialogues (1950–57, rev 1977)
- Thresholds, orchestrated in 1975 by George Champion (1954–1955)
- Poems of Youth, trilogy for orchestra (1921–1933, entirely rewritten 1983–1984)
- Cosmic Cycle, trilogy for large orchestra (1981)
- Encounter, a dramatic sequence in five scenes for piano and orchestra (1977)
- Out of the Darkness (Syntonic Drama in Five Acts) (1982)

=== Chamber music ===
- Three Melodies, for flute, piano and cello (1918, rev 1974)
- Piano Quintet (1919)
- Three Poems, for violin and piano (1919–1920)
- Three Songs (without words), for flute, violin and piano/harp (1919)
- Violin Sonata (1920)
- Dark Passage, for string quartet (1941)
- Solitude, string quartet (transcribed from Tetragram #4, for piano) (1926)
- Barcarolle, for violin and piano (1954)
- Allehuia, for carillon (1976)
- Nostalgia, for alto flute, piano, and three strings (1979–83)
- Advent (String Quartet #1) (1978)
- Crisis and Overcoming (String Quartet #2) (1979)

=== Piano works ===
- Trois Poëmes (1913)
- Cortège Funèbre (1914)
- Tango D'Antan (1914)
- Mosaics, a tone cycle (1918)
- Dithyrambs (1919)
- Spanish Rhythms, for a dance drama (1920)
- Catharsis (1923)
- Moments, 15 tone poems (originally 22) which later became the first three Pentagrams (1924–26)
- Granites: Three Paeans (1925-27)
- Tetragram #1, The Quest (1920)
- Tetragram #2, Crucifixion (1926)
- Tetragram #3, Rebirth (1927)
- Tetragram #4, Adolescence (1925)
- Tetragram #5, Solitude (1927)
- Tetragram #6, Emergence (1929)
- Tetragram #7, Tendrils (1924)
- Tetragram #8, Primavera (1928)
- Tetragram #9, Summer Nights (1967)
- Pentagram #1, The Coming Forth (1924)
- Pentagram #2, The Enfolding (1924)
- Pentagram #3, Release (1926)
- Pentagram #4, The Human Way (1926)
- Syntony (1919–34, rev 1967)
- Thresholds (1954–55)
- Theurgy (Tone Ritual in Five Movements) (1976)
- Transmutation (1976)
- Autumn (1977)
- Three Cantos (1977)
- Epic Poem (1978)
- Rite of Transcendence (1981)
- Processional (1983)

=== Vocal music ===
- Trois Chansons de Bilitis, for contralto and harp (1918, rev 1981)
- Trois Poëmes Tragique, for contralto and piano (1918, rev 1979)
- Poem (1918)
- Commune, for baritone or mezzo-soprano and piano (1929)
- Nazaria, scenic music for the "Pilgrimage Play" for piano (1922)
- Affirmation (1930, rev 1981)
- Two Affirmations (1931)
- Three Invocations, for baritone and piano (1939–41)
