= List of compositions by Jacques Champion de Chambonnières =

Full list of compositions by Jacques Champion de Chambonnières (c. 1601/02 – 1672), French harpsichordist, dancer and composer.

== Key to columns ==
- A. Edition gravée. Les Pieces de Clavessin de Monsieur de Chambonnieres. Se vendent à Paris chez Jollain rue S^{t} Jacques à la Ville de Cologne Auec privilège de Roy. 1670. Liure Premier. Liure Second.
- B. Manuscrit Bauyn. Bibliothèque nationale de Paris. Manuscrits de la Réserve Vm^{7} 674 et 675.
- C. Bibliothèque Sainte-Geneviève de Paris. Manuscrit 2356.
- D. Bibliothèque Sainte-Geneviève de Paris. Manuscrit 2348.
- E. Bibliothèque du Conservatoire de Paris. Manuscrits de la Réserve 18223
- F. Bibliothèque du Conservatoire de Paris. Manuscrits sans cote (no barré 2389. Bibliothèque de l'Université de France).
- G. Bibliothèque de la ville de Versailles. Manuscrits 139 à 143.
- H. Hof und Staatsbibliothek de Munich. Manuscrit 1503.
- J. Library of Christ Church d'Oxford. Manuscrit 1236.

== Compositions ==
No.	Title	Key	A	B	C	D	E	F	G	H	J
1	Allemande la Rare	A minor	I 01, 02	58 V							
2	Courante et son Double	A minor	I 03 à 06	59 V, 60 R							
3	Courante	A minor	I 07, 08	62 R		01 V					
4	Courante	A minor	I 09, 10			02 R					
5	Sarabande	A minor	I 11, 12	62 V							
6	Gaillarde	A minor	I 13*, 14*	65 V							
7	Allemande la Dunquerque	C major	I 13, 14	02 V							
8	Courante Iris et son double	C major	I 15, 16	05 V	10 V, 11 R		03 V				
9	Courante et son double	C major	I 17	12 V			05 V				
10	Sarabande de la Reyne	C major	I 19, 20	10 V							
11	Allemande la Loureuse	D minor	I 21, 22	16 R							
12	Courante la Toute Belle	D minor	I 23, 24	16 V							
13	Courante de Madame	D minor	I 25, 26	18 R							
14	Courante	D minor	I 27, 28	20 R							
15	Sarabande	D minor	I 29, 30	20 V						6 V	
16	Courante les Baricades	D minor	I 31, 32	19 V				27 V, 28 R			
17	Gigue la Madelainette	D major	I 33, 34	30 R							
18	Gigue	D major	I 35, 36	31 R							
19	Allemande	F major	I 37, 38	32 V							
20	Courante	F major	I 39, 40								
21	Courante	F major	I 41, 42	35 V							
22	Courante	F major	I 43, 44	33 V		06 V					
23	Sarabande	F major	I 45	42 R							
24	Pavane l'Entretien des Dieux	G minor	I 47 à 49								
25	Courante	G minor	I 51, 52								
26	Sarabande	G minor	I 53, 54								
27	Courante	G minor	I 55, 56								
28	Sarabande	G major	I 57, 58	50 R							
29	Gigue la Vilageoise	G major	I 59, 60	51 V		15 V					
30	Canaries	G major	I 61, 62	52 R		10 R					
31	Allemande	C major	II 01, 02	03 V							
32	Courante	C major	II 03, 04								
33	Courante	C major	II 05, 06	07 V							
34	Gaillarde	C major	II 07, 08								
35	Gigue la Verdinguette et son double	C major	II 09, 10	12 R			09 V				
36	Allemande	D minor	II 11, 12	15 V		16 R					
37	Courante	D minor	II 13, 14								
38	Courante	D minor	II 15, 16								
39	Courante	D minor	II 17, 18								
40	Sarabande	D minor	II 19, 20	21 R							
41	Allemande	D major	II 21, 22								
42	Courante	D major	II 23, 24			11 R					
43	Courante	D major	II 25, 26	29 V		11 V					
44	Courante	D major	II 27, 28	27 R							
45	Sarabande	D major	II 29, 30	28 V							
46	Allemande	F major	II 31, 32	33 R							
47	Courante	F major	II 33, 34	40 V		04 R					
48	Courante	F major	II 35, 36	38 V		07 R					
49	Sarabande	F major	II 37, 38			06 R					
50	Pavanne	G minor	II 39 à 41								
51	Gigue	G minor	II 43, 44								
52	Courante	G minor	II 45, 46	54 R		01 R					
53	Gigue où il y a un canon	G minor	II 47								
54	Allemande	G major	II 49, 50								
55	Gigue	G major	II 51, 52								
56	Courante et son double	G major	II 53, 54	48 V			71 V				
57	Courante	G major	II 55, 56	46 V		15 R					
58	Courante et son double	G major	II 57, 58	48 R		13 V	73 V				
59	Sarabande Jeunes Zéphirs et son double (deux dessus instr. et basse)	G major (or D major)	II 59, 60	50 V			75 V		22 R	1 R	
60	Menuet	G major	II 61	50 V							
61	Allemande la Moutier	C major		01 R							
62	Allemande	C major		02 R							
63	Allemande	C major		03 R							
64	Courante	C major		04 R (or 49 V)							
65	Autre	C major		04 V							
66	Courante	C major		05 R							
67	Courante	C major		06 R							
68	Courante	C major		06 V							
69	Courante	C major		07 R							
70	Courante	C major		08 R							
71	Courante	C major		08 V							
72	Autre	C major		09 R							
73	Sarabande	C major		09 V							
74	Sarabande	C major		10 R							
75	Sarabande grave	C major		11 R							
76	Gigue	C major		11 V							
77	Courante	C major		13 R							
78	Courante	C major		13 V							
79	Courante	C major		14 R							
80	Courante	C major		14 V							
81	Chaconne de M. de la Chappelle dit Chambonnières	C major		15 R							
82	Courante	D minor		17 R							
83	Courante	D minor		17 V							
84	Courante et son Double	D minor		18 V, 19 R							6
85	Sarabande	D minor		21 V							
86	Sarabande	D minor		22 R							
87	Pavanne	D minor		22 V, 23 R							
88	Sarabande	D minor		23 V							
89	Allemande la Mignonne	D major		24 R							
90	Courante	D major		24 V		10 V, 11 R					
91	Courante	D major		25 R							
92	Courante	D major		25 V		13 R					
93	Courante	D major		26 R							
94	Courante	D major		26 V		12 V					
95	Courante	D major		27 V							
96	Sarabande	D major		28 R		10 V					
97	Courante	D major		29 R							
98	Gigue Bruscanbille	D major		30 V							
99	Gigue	E minor		31 V, 32 R							
100	Courante	F major		34 R (or 34 V or 39 R)		03 V					
101	Courante	F major		35 R							
102	Courante	F major		36 R							
103	Courante	F major		36 V							
104	Courante	F major		37 R		05 V					
105	Courante	F major		37 V (or 38 R)							
106	Rondeau	F major		39 V		07 V, 08 R					
107	Courante	F major		40 R							
108	Courante	F major		41 R							
109	Sarabande	F major		41 V							
110	Volte (Sarabande O beau jardin) (deux dessus instr. et basse)	F major (or D Major)		42 V			51 V, 52 R		22 V		
111	Sarabande	F major		43 R		06 V					
112	Sarabande	F major		43 V							
113	Chaconne	F major		44 R							
114	Brusque	F major		44 V		04 V					
115	Autre Brusque	F major		45 R		05 R					
116	Chaconne	F major		45 V		08 R à 09 R					
117	Courante	G major		46 R							
118	Courante	G major		47 R							
119	Courante	G major		47 V							
120	Sarabande	G major		49 R		15 R, 15 V					
121	Sarabande	G major		51 R							
122	Gigue	G major		52 V							
123	Chaconne	G major		53 R							
124	Allemande l'Affligée	G minor		53 V							
125	Sarabande	G minor		54 V							
126	Gigue	G minor		55 R							
127	Gigue	G minor		55 V							
128	Pavanne	G minor		57 R, 57 V							
129	La Drollerie	A minor		59 R							
130	Courante	A minor		60 V							
131	Courante	A minor		61 R							
132	Courante	A minor		61 V							
133	Sarabande	A minor		63 R							
134	Sarabande	A minor		63 V		02 R					
135	Sarabande	A minor		64 R		02 V					
136	Sarabande	A minor		64 V							
137	Gigue la Cocquette	A minor		65 R	07 V						
138	Allemande	B♭ minor		66 R							
139	Courante	B♭ minor		66 V							
140	Sarabande	B♭ minor		67 R							
141	Gaillarde et son Double	B♭ minor		67 V, 68 R							
142	Paschalia (Courante)	A minor			03 R						
