= List of compositions by Johanna Senfter =

This is a list of compositions by Johanna Senfter.

== Piano ==
=== Piano Solo ===
- 8 Stücke, Op. 29
- 4 Stücke, Op. 45
- 3 Stücke, Op. 59
- 3 klavierstücke, Op. 77
- 3 klavierstücke, Op. 83
- klavierstücke, Op. 113
- Veränderungen, Op. 118
- 3 Stücke, Op. 122
- 2 klavierstücke, Op. 129
- Six easy pieces for beginners
- Mazurka in F minor
- Scherzo in D minor
- Klavierstudie
- Passacaglia No. 5 in F major
- Passacaglia No. 7 in G minor
- Passacaglia No. 8 in h minor
- Berceuse in E major
- Vogelweise in G minor
- 8 Passacaglien
- Fugue No. 4
- Fugue No. 5
- Fugue No. 7
- 7 fugen

=== Two Pianos ===
- Passacaglia for two pianos, Op. 14
- Sonata for two pianos, Op. 39
- Tonstücke in A minor for two pianos, Op. 109

=== Piano, Four Hands ===
- 7 Waltzer for Piano Four Hands

== Organ ==
- Fantasie und Fugue, Op. 30a
- 7 Choral Preludes, Op. 30b
- Variations on ‘Morgenglanz der Ewigheit’ for Organ, Op. 66
- 10 Choral Pieces, Op. 70
- 6 Choral Preludes, Op. 73

== Instrument solo ==
- Violin Sonata in G minor, Op. 61
- Violin Sonata
- 2 sonatas for Violin solo

== Chamber music ==
=== Violin and Piano ===
- Romance and Allegro for Violin and Piano, Op. 3a
- Violin Sonata in G major, Op. 6
- 6 little pieces for Violin and Piano, Op. 13
- Violin Sonata in D minor, Op. 17
- Violin Sonata in A major, Op. 26
- Violin Sonata in G minor, Op. 32
- Violin Sonata in D major, Op. 68
- Violin Sonata in C major, Op. 80
- Veränderungen for Violin and Piano, Op. 94
- Five pieces for Violin and Piano, Op. 100
- Violin Sonata in F major, Op.108
- Kleine Sonata for Violin and Piano, Op. 133

=== Cello and Piano ===
- Andante and Scherzo for Cello and Piano, Op. 3b
- Cello Sonata in A major, Op. 10
- 3 älte tänze for Cello and Piano, Op. 25
- Cello Sonata in E♭ major, Op. 79

=== Clarinet and Piano ===
- Sonata for Clarinet and Piano in A major, Op. 57

=== Viola and Piano ===
- Viola Sonata in F minor, Op. 41
- Veränderungen, Op. 94
- Viola Sonata in F major, Op. 101
- Duo for Viola and Piano, Op. 127
- Five Pieces, without opus number

=== Organ and Violin ===
- Little Sonata for Organ and Violin, Op. 75

=== Organ and Viola ===
- 6 Pieces for Organ and Viola, Op. 76

=== Violin and Viola ===
- Duo for Violin and Viola, Op. 58
- Kleine Duo for Violin and Viola, Op. 116

=== Two violins ===
- 10 alte tänze for two Violins, Op. 91

=== Piano Trio ===
- Piano Trio, Op. 21
- Piano Trio, Op. 47
- Piano Trio, Op. 54
- Trio for Piano, Violin and Viola, Op. 96
- Piano Trio, Op. 134
- Piano Trio

=== Piano Quartet ===
- Piano Quartet in E minor, Op. 11
- Piano Quartet in D minor, Op. 112

=== String Quartet ===
- String Quartet in D minor, Op. 4
- String Quartet in F♯ minor, Op 28
- String Quartet in F minor, Op. 46
- Variations for String Quartet in D♭ major, Op. 63
- String Quartet in B♭ major, Op. 64
- String Quartet in C minor, Op. 115

=== Other ===
- Tonstück for 8 winds instruments in E major, Op. 60
- Trio for Piano, Horn and Clarinet, Op. 103
- Two pieces for Violin, Viola, Cello and Harp, Op. 111
- Quintet for Clarinet and String Quartet in B♭ major, Op. 119

== Orchestral ==
=== Symphonies ===
- Symphony No. 1 in F major, Op. 22
- Symphony No. 2 in D minor, Op. 27
- Symphony No. 3 in A major, Op. 43
- Symphony No. 4 in B♭ major, Op. 50
- Symphony No. 5 in E minor, Op. 67
- Symphony No. 6 in E♭ major, Op. 74
- Symphony No. 7 in F minor, Op. 84
- Symphony No. 8 in E♭ minor, Op. 107
- Symphony No. 9 in E♭ minor, Op. 117

=== Symphonic Poems ===
- Tonstück for Orchestra, Op. 102
- Folge von heiteren stücke for Orchestra, Op. 130

=== Piano and Orchestra ===
- Piano Concerto in G minor, Op. 90

=== Violin and Orchestra ===
- Violin Concerto in E minor, Op. 1
- Violin Concerto in D minor, Op. 35
- Violin Concerto in B minor, Op. 71
- 2 Vortragstücken for Violin and Orchestra

=== Viola da Gamba and Orchestra ===
- Gamba Concerto in B minor, Op. 105

=== Viola and Orchestra ===
- Viola Concerto in C minor, Op. 121

=== Other ===
- Suite for Orchestra in D major, Op. 2
- Suite for Orchestra in C minor, Op. 5
- Variations for Orchestra, Op. 9
- 3 Gesänge for Orchestra, Op. 24
- Concerto for two Violins and String Orchestra, Op. 40
- 5 kleine Tänze for Orchestra, Op. 81

== Choral ==
- 2 Chorals, Op. 16
- Die nacht ist vorgerückt, Op. 18a
- Gebet, Op. 19
- Weihnachtskantilene, Op. 31
- Heilige Nächte, Op. 36
- Ein Traum, Op. 55
- Das Licht scheint, Op. 62
- Chor der Töten, Op. 114

== Lieder ==
- 8 Lieder, Op. 8a
- 8 Lieder, Op. 8b
- 6 Lieder, Op. 15
- Abschied, Op. 20
- Wenn der Herr, Op. 33a
- Zur Ruh, zur Ruh ihr Müden Glieder, Op. 34/2
- Maria und der Schiffer, Op. 34a
- 3 Lieder, Op. 42
- 3 Gesänge, Op. 49
- Maria vor dem Kreuze, Op. 51
- 4 Lieder, Op. 53
- 3 Gesänge, Op. 56b
- 6 Lieder, Op. 65
- 3 Gesänge, Op. 72
- Unsterblich, Op. 78
- 6 Lieder, Op. 82
- 4 Gesänge, Op. 86
- 5 Lieder, Op. 88
- 3 Lieder, Op. 92
- 3 Lieder, Op. 97
- Trost, Op. 99
- 3 Lieder, Op. 106a
- 6 Lieder, Op. 110
- Gesänge von Hölderlin, Op. 120
- Lieder von C.F. Meyer, Op. 124
- Lieder, Op. 125
- Lieder, Op. 128
- 6 Lieder, Op. 131
