= List of compositions by Emilie Mayer =

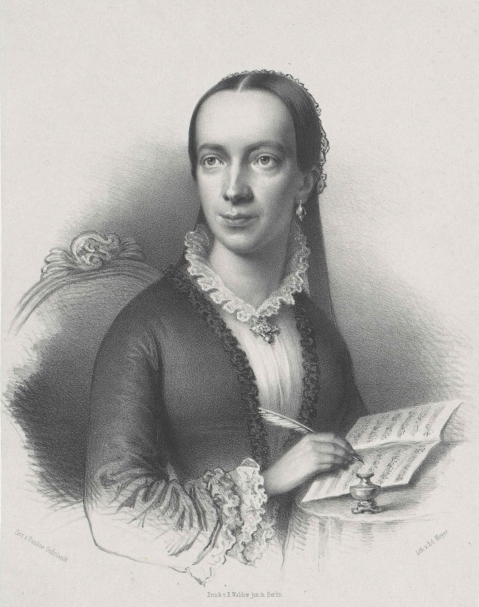
Lithograph of Emilie Mayer based on a drawing by Pauline Suhrlandt

This is a list of compositions by Emilie Mayer.

== Piano ==
=== Piano solo ===
- 9 Tänze (composed probably no later than 1840)
- Piano Sonata in D minor (composed 1860–1870)
- Piano Sonata in D major (composed 1850–1880)
- Allemande fantastique, Op.29 (pub. 1871)
- Tonwellen (Valse), Op. 30 (pub. 1871)
- Ungaraise, Op. 31 (pub. 1871)
- Valse, Op. 32 (pub. 1871)
- Mazurka, Op. 33 (pub. 1871)
- Drei Humoresken, Op. 41 (pub. 1875)
- Impromptu, Op. 44 (pub. 1878)
- La modesta, Op. 45
- 6 Klavierstücke für die Kinderwelt, Op. 48/1 (pub. 1882)
- March in A major

== Chamber music ==
=== Violin and piano ===
- Violin Sonata in F major, Op. 17
- Violin Sonata in A minor, Op. 18
- Violin Sonata in E minor, Op. 19
- Violin Sonata in D minor, Op. 29
- Notturno for Violin and Piano, Op. 48/2 (pub. 1883)
- Violin Sonata in D minor
- Violin Sonata in D major
- Violin Sonata in E♭ major

=== Cello and piano ===
- Cello Sonata in D minor, Op. 38
- Cello Sonata in C major, Op. 40
- Cello Sonata in D major, Op. 47
- Cello Sonata in F major
- Cello Sonata in C major
- Cello Sonata in C minor
- Cello Sonata in D minor
- Cello Sonata in E minor
- Cello Sonata in A major
- Cello Sonata in B♭ major
- Cello Sonata in B minor

=== Piano trios ===
- Piano Trio in E minor, Op. 12
- Piano Trio in D major, Op. 13
- Piano Trio in E♭ major
- Piano Trio in D minor
- Piano Trio in E minor
- Piano Trio in A minor
- Piano Trio in B minor, Op. 16
- Piano Trio in B♭ major

=== Piano quartets ===
- Piano Quartet in E♭ major
- Piano Quartet in G major

=== String quartets ===
- String Quartet in G minor, Op. 14
- String Quartet in F major
- String Quartet in D minor
- String Quartet in E minor
- String Quartet in G major
- String Quartet in B♭ major
- String Quartet in A major

=== String quintets ===
- String Quintet in D major
- String Quintet in D minor

== Orchestral ==
=== Symphonies ===
- Symphony No. 1 in C minor (premièred before 4 March 1847)
- Symphony No. 2 in E minor (premièred before 4 March 1847)
- Symphony No. 3 in C major "Military" (premièred 21 April 1850)
- Symphony No. 4 in B minor (premièred 16 March 1851)
- Symphony No. 5 in D major (premièred 1 May 1852) [The Worldcat source given in note #2 is wrong, and this error has been perpetuated by the Furore verlag edition, 2005, and also by the recording on Dreyer-Gaido. The F minor symphony is No. 7; the Symphony No. 5 is in D major and the score is presumed lost. See: https://www.unsungcomposers.com/forum/index.php/topic,3920.0.html]
- Symphony No. 6 in E major (premièred 25 April 1853)
- Symphony No. 7 in F minor (1855–56; premièred in April 1862)
- Symphony No. 8 in F major (1856–57; premièred in March 1862) – presumed lost

=== Piano and orchestral ===
- Piano Concerto in B♭ major (1850)

=== Overtures ===
- Overture (No. 1) in C minor (early work - no full score survives)
- Overture No. 2 in D major (premièred 21 April 1850)
- Overture No. 3 in C major (premièred 21 April 1850)
- Overture (No. 4) in D minor (premièred 21 April 1850)
- Ouverture serieuse (No. 5) (premièred 15 January 1879) – presumed lost
- Overture to Faust (No. 6), Op. 46 (1880; premièred in March 1881)
- Ouvertura giocosa (No. 7) (premièred in April 1883) – presumed lost

== Opera ==
- Die Fischerin

== Lieder ==
- Du bist wie eine Blume, Op. 7/1
- O lass mich dein gedenken, Op. 7/2
- Wenn der Abendstern die Rosen, Op. 7/3
- Erlkönig (version 1)
- Erlkönig (version 2)
- 2 Gesänge
- 2 Kinderlieder
