= List of compositions by Eduard Strauss =

This is an incomplete list of compositions by Eduard Strauss (1835–1916), son of Johann Strauss I and the younger brother of Johann Strauss II.

== Waltzes, Polkas and Marches ==
Work	Dance type	Opus (and year)
Ideal (Mes sentiments)	Polka-française	Op. 1 (1863)
La belle Helene	Quadrille	Op. 14
Bahn Frei! ('Clear Track!')	Polka-schnell	Op. 45 (1869)
In Künstlerkreisen ('In Artistic Circles')	Polka-française	Op. 47
Die Biene	Polka-française	Op. 54
Mit Dampf! ('Steam Up!')	Polka-schnell	Op. 70
Auf und Davon! ('Up and Away!')	Polka-schnell	Op. 73
Fesche Geister ('Jaunty or Fresh Spirit')	Waltz	Op. 75
Doctrinen ('Doctrines')	Waltz	Op. 79
Amores Greeting	Polka-française	Op. 83
Interpretationen ('Interpretations')	Waltz	Op. 97
Weyprecht-Payer	March	Op. 120
Ohne Aufenthalt ('Without Stopping!')	Polka-schnell	Op. 112
Unter der Enns	Polka-schnell	Op. 121
Tour und Retour	Polka-française	Op. 125
Alpenrose	Polka	Op. 127
Knall und Fall	Polka-schnell	Op. 132
Carmen (themes from Georges Bizet's Carmen)	Quadrille	Op. 134
Verdicte Waltz	Waltz	Op. 137
Von Land zu Land	Polka-française	Op. 140
Fatinitza Waltz	Waltz	Op. 147
Das Leben ist doch Schön ('The Life is so Beautiful')	Waltz	Op. 150
Treuliebchen	Polka-française	Op. 152
Saat und Ernte	Polka-schnell	Op. 159
Leuchtkäferln	Waltz	Op. 161
Reiselust (delight in travel)	Polka-française	Op. 166
Ausser Rand und Band ('Out of Control')	Polka-schnell	Op. 168
Lustfahrten Walzer	Waltz	Op. 177
Feuerfunken Walzer	Waltz	Op. 185
Hectograph	Polka-schnell	Op. 186
Glockensignale Walzer	Waltz	Op. 198
Krone und Schleier ('Crown and Veil')	Waltz	Op. 200
Österreichs Volker-Treue	March	Op. 211
Mit Chic! ('With Style')	Polka-schnell	Op. 221
Chere amie	Polka-française	Op. 223
Mit Vergnügen! ('With Pleasure!')	Polka-schnell	Op. 228
Ohne Bremse ('Without Brakes')	Polka-schnell	Op. 238
Old England for Ever!	Polka	Op. 239
Blauäuglein ('Little Blue Eyes')	Polka-française	Op. 254
Mit Extrapost ('Posthaste')	Polka-schnell	Op. 259
Myrtle Magic	Waltz	Op. 272
Blüthenkranz Johann Strauss'scher Walzer ('Bouquet of Johann Strauss' Waltzes in Chronological Order from 1844 to Present Time')	Waltz	Op.292 (1894)

== See also ==
- The Strauss Family - TV Drama
