= List of compositions by Juan Crisóstomo Arriaga =

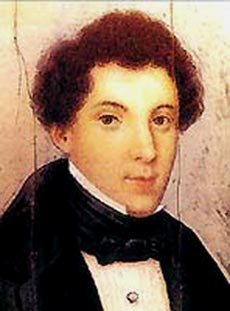
Juan Crisóstomo Arriaga

The following is a list of compositions by Juan Crisóstomo Arriaga. The list only consists of known or referenced compositions, as Arriaga died at a very early age. Some of these compositions might be edited or not completed.

== By chronological order ==
- Nada y mucho, for octet (1817)
- Overture "Nonetto", Op. 1, for small orchestra (1818)
- Military March, Op. 2, for band (1819)
- Hymn "Ya luce..." ("Patria"), Op. 3, for choir and orchestra (1819)
- Hymn "Cántabros nobles...", Op. 4, for choir and orchestra (1819)
- Romanza, for piano (1819)
- Los esclavos felices, opera in two acts for soloists, choir and orchestra (1820) (lost, only the overture and sketches survived)
- Tema variado en cuarteto, Op. 17, for string quartet (1820)
- Overture in D major, Op. 20, for orchestra (1821)
- Motet "Stabat Mater", for two tenors, bass and orchestra (1821)
- Motet "O Salutaris", for two tenors, bass and orchestra (1821)
- Variaciones sobre el tema de la Húngara, Op. 22, for violin and basso continuo (1821)
- Variaciones sobre el tema de la Húngara, Op. 23, for string quartet (1822)
- Aria de Beltrán, for tenor and orchestra (1822)
- Three Etudes or Capriccios, for piano (1822)
- Motet "O salutes hostia", for two tenors, basso continuo and string orchestra (1823)
- Fugue in eight voices "Et vitam venturi" (1823) (lost)
- Three Quartets (1823)
  - String Quartet No. 1 in D minor
  - String Quartet No. 2 in A major
  - String Quartet No. 3 in E♭ major
- Symphony in D major, "Sinfonía a gran orquesta" (1824)
- Canon of Henneville (1824)
- Mass in four voices (1824) (lost)
- Salve Regina (1824) (lost)
- Médée, opera for soprano and orchestra (1825) (unfinished, only the aria survived)
- Ma tante Aurore (All' Aurora), duo for tenor, basso continuo and orchestra (1825)
- Edipo, for tenor and orchestra (1825) (only the Aria of Polinicio survived)
- Herminie, cantata for soprano and orchestra (1825)
- Agar, cantata for soprano, tenor and orchestra (1825)

=== Works without date of composition ===
- Audi benigne, for choir.
