= List of compositions by Luise Adolpha Le Beau =

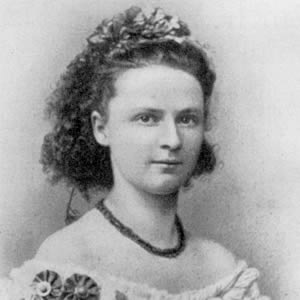
Luise Adolpha Le Beau (1872)

This is a list of compositions by Luise Adolpha Le Beau.

== Piano ==
=== Piano solo ===
- 3 pieces, Op. 1
- Konzert-Etüde, Op. 2
- Theme & Variations for piano, Op. 3
- Piano Sonata in A Minor, Op. 8
- 8 Preludes, Op. 12
- 6 Fugues, Op. 21
- Improvisata, Op. 30
- Romance in Des Major, Op. 31
- Gavotte in F Minor, Op. 32
- Ballade in B Minor, Op. 47
- Sarabande, Op. 48/1
- Gavotte, Op. 48/2
- Gigue, Op. 48/3
- Deutscher Reignen, Op. 49
- Trauermarsch in D Minor, Op. 53
- 3 pieces, Op. 57
- Barcarole, Op. 59
- Im Walde, Op. 63
- Abendklänge, Op. 64

== Chamber music ==
=== Violin and piano ===
- Violin Sonata in C Minor, Op. 10
- Mazurka for Violin and Piano, Op. 13/1
- Gavotte for Violin and Piano, Op. 13/2
- Romance for Violin and Piano, Op. 13/3
- Schlummerlied for Violin and Piano, Op. 13/4
- Präludium for Violin and Piano, Op. 13/5
- Romance in G Major, Op. 35
- Elegie in G Minor for Violin and Piano, Op. 44
- Violin Sonata in E Minor, Op. 46
- Du bist das Morgenroth for Violin and Piano, Op. 58/1
- Der erste Kuss for Violin and Piano, Op. 58/2
- Gondellied for Violin and Piano, Op. 58/3

=== Cello and piano ===
- Cello Sonata in D Major, Op. 17
- Romance for Cello and Piano, Op. 24/1
- Gavotte for Cello and Piano, Op. 24/2
- Wiegenlied for Cello and Piano, Op. 24/3
- Mazurka for Cello and Piano, Op. 24/4
- Five pieces for Cello and Piano, Op. 65a

=== Viola and piano ===
- Nachtstück for Viola and Piano, Op. 26/1
- Träumerei for Viola and Piano, Op. 26/2
- Polonaise for Viola and Piano, Op. 26/3

=== Piano trio ===
- Piano Trio in D Minor, Op. 15

=== Piano quartet ===
- Piano Quartet in F Minor, Op. 28

=== String quartet ===
- String Quartet, Op. 34

=== String quintet ===
- String Quintet, Op. 54

=== Other ===
- Canon for 2 violins and Piano, Op. 38

== Orchestral ==
=== Symphonies ===
- Symphony in F Major, Op. 41

=== Symphonic poems ===
- Hohenbaden, Op. 43

=== Piano and orchestra ===
- Fantasie for piano and Orchestra, Op. 25
- Piano Concerto, Op. 37

=== Other ===
- Overture in F Major, Op. 23

== Opera ==
- Hadumoth, Op. 40
- Der verzauberte Kalif, Op. 55

== Choral music ==
- Der schlummerlosen Sonne, Op. 9/1
- Beweint sie, Op. 9/2
- Müde bin ich, Op. 9/3
- Neuer Frühling, Op. 9/4
- Ein geistlicher Abend, Op. 9/5
- Nordmännerlied, Op. 19/1
- Rheinsage, Op. 19/2
- Ständchen, Op. 19/3
- Grabgesang, Op. 19/4
- Ruth, Op. 27
- Thumerlied, Op. 36/1
- Lied, Op. 36/2
- Der Wind, der wandernde Wind, Op. 60/1
- Schneeglöckchen, Op. 60/2
- Vater unser, Op. 61
- Der 100. Psalm, Op. 62
- Sanctus, Op. 65
- Miriams Lied

== Lieder ==
- Künftiger Frühling, Op. 4/1
- Der träumende See, Op. 4/2
- Meeres Abend, Op. 4/3
- Veilchen, unter Gras versteckt, Op. 4/4
- Der stille Grund, Op. 4/5
- Frühlingsanfang, Op. 6/1
- Abendlied, Op. 6/2
- Gruß an die Nacht, Op. 7/1
- Ein Gebet, Op. 7/2
- Juche, Op. 7/3
- Die Alpenrose, Op. 7/4
- Wiegenlied, Op. 7/5
- Kornblumen und Heidekraut, Op. 11/1
- Ohn' Ade, Op. 11/2
- Abendfrieden, Op. 11/3
- Der Spielmann, Op. 11/4
- Im Arno, Op. 11/5
- Gottes Segen, Op. 14/1
- Trost, Op. 14/2
- Abendlied, Op. 14/3
- Der kühne Schiffer, Op. 16/1
- Die Vätergruft, Op. 16/2
- Abendlied, Op. 18/1
- Unterm Christbaum, Op. 18/2
- Trutznachtigall, Op. 18/3
- Herbstklage, Op. 18/4
- Frühlingsnacht, Op. 18/5
- Im Sängersaal, Op. 22
- In den Ufern des Ayr, Op. 29/1
- O kehre bald zurück, Op. 29/2
- Liebestraum, Op. 33/1
- Spielmannslied, Op. 33/2
- Frisch gesungen, Op. 33/3
- Wiegenlied, Op. 39/1
- Erinnerung, Op. 39/2
- Der Rose Bitte, Op. 39/3
- Das Weib des Räubers, Op. 42/1
- Die Insulanerin, Op. 42/2
- Wie dir, so mir, Op. 45/1
- In der Mondnacht, Op. 45/2
- Ich habe die Blumen so gern, Op. 45/3
- Die Spinnerin, Op. 50/1
- Fischerlied, Op. 50/2
- Im Winter, Op. 50/3
- Acht Kinderlieder, Op. 52
- Unsterblichkeit: Hymnus, Op. 56/1
- Unsterblichkeit; Hymnus, Op. 56/2
