= List of compositions by Pierre Rode =

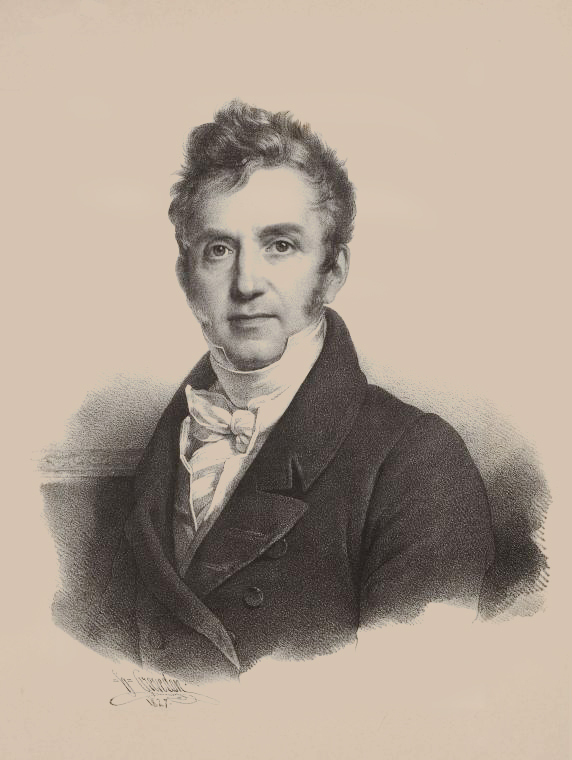
Pierre Rode

This is a list of compositions by Pierre Rode.

== With opus number ==
- Six duos for two violins, Op. 1
- Violin Concerto No. 1 in D minor, Op. 3
- Violin Concerto No. 2 in E major, Op. 4
- Violin Concerto No. 3 in G minor, Op. 5
- Violin Concerto No. 4 in A major, Op. 6
- Violin Concerto No. 5 in D major, Op. 7
- Violin Concerto No. 6 in B♭ major, Op. 8
- Violin Concerto No. 7 in A minor, Op. 9
- Air Varié for violin solo and string trio, Op. 10
- String Quartet No. 1 in E♭ major, Op. 11
- Air varié in E major, Op. 12
- Violin Concerto No. 8 in E minor, Op. 13
- Andante varié, Op. 16
- Violin Concerto No. 9 in C major, Op. 17
- String Quartet No. 4 in G major, Op. 18
- Violin Concerto No. 10 in B minor, Op. 19
- 24 Caprices for Violin, Op. 22
- Violin Concerto No. 11 in D major, Op. 23
- Air varié in D major, Op. 26
- Violin Concerto No. 12 in E major, Op. 27
- Violin Concerto No. 13 in F♯ minor / A major, Op. posth.

== Without opus number ==
- 12 Etudes for Violin
- Exercises pour le Violon
- Thème Varié No. 4
- Polonaise for Guitar, Flute or Violin
- Variations on Nel cor più non mi sento from Paisiello's La molinara (for Violin and Orchestra)
- Introduction et variations brillantes, "Air tyrolien" (for Violin and Orchestra)
