= List of compositions for electronic keyboard =

The works listed below are compositions for electronic keyboard.

== 20th century ==
=== Solo or solo with tape ===
- Karlheinz Stockhausen
  - Klavierstück XV "Synthi-Fou", for one synthesizer player and tape
  - Komet als Klavierstück XVII, for one synthesizer player and tape
  - Klavierstück XVIII "Mittwochsformel"

=== Duo ===
- Karlheinz Stockhausen
  - Wochenkreis, for one synthesizer player and basset horn
