= List of symphonies in F-sharp major =

The list of symphonies in F♯ major includes:

- Symphony in F♯ major, Op. 40 by Erich Wolfgang Korngold, (1951–2)
- Symphony No. 10 by Gustav Mahler (sketched between 1910–1, completed by Deryck Cooke and published in 1967)
- Turangalîla-Symphonie by Olivier Messiaen (1946–8) (arguably, since the advanced harmonic language does not adhere to traditional rules)
- Symphony No. 5 by Alexander Scriabin (1908–10) (arguably, since the advanced harmonic language does not adhere to traditional rules)
