= List of RISM abbreviations =

The RISM library abbreviations, or sigla, are used for identifying locations of musical manuscripts. The special volume RISM-Bibliothekssigel. Gesamtverzeichnis (RISM Library Sigla. Complete Index), which appeared in 1999, has been available in a regularly updated version on the RISM website since 2006 and in a searchable database online since 2011.

The complete list is very long (see pdf). Only a selection of major source locations are listed here:

- F-Pn Bibliothèque nationale de France
- GB-Lbl British Library
- GB-Ob Bodleian Library
- I-FEca :it:Curia Arcivescovile di Ferrara e Comacchio, Archivio
- I-MOas it:Archivio di Stato di Modena
- I-MOe it:Biblioteca estense universitaria di Modena
- E-Mn es:Biblioteca Nacional de España
- E-Bbc es:Biblioteca de Cataluña
