= List of compositions by Yehuda Yannay =

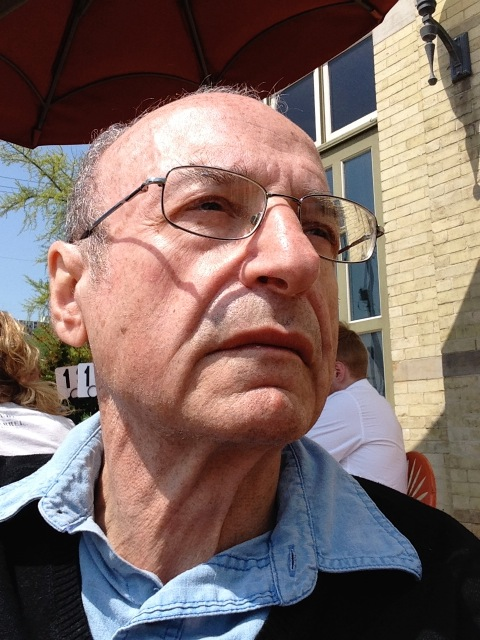
Yehuda Yannay

This is a list of compositions by Yehuda Yannay

== Solo ==
- Twelve Monophonic Dances for any wind instrument (1958)
- Music for Piano (1962)
- Permutations for solo percussion (1964)
- Statement for flute (1964)
- Continuum for piano Op. 15 (1966)
- Coloring Book for the Harpist (1969)
- Seven Late Spring Pieces for piano (1973)
- Im Silberwald (In the Silver Forest) for trombone, glass harmonica and tape (1983)
- Between the Raindrops for solo guitar (1984)
- Tangoul Mortii (Tango of Death) for contrabass solo (1996)
- Tangoul Mortii (Tango of Death) version for cello solo (1997)
- Tangoul Mortii (Tango of Death) version for viola solo (1997)
- Piano Portfolio I for solo piano (1994–2000)
- The One-Legged Dancer for toy piano (accordion or harpsichord (2001)
- Three Organic Pieces for organ (2004)
- Hornology for horn (2004)
- Piano Transplant (co-composed with Josh Schmidt) (2004)
- Double Transplant for piano (2004)
- Three Postcards from Paris for piano, an excerpt from Midwest Mythologist (2012)
- Incipit Vita Nova for accordion (2013)
- The Exquisite Viola for viola solo (2013)
- Bits into Pieces for piano and iPad electronics (2014)

== Chamber music ==
- Variations for 2 flutes (1960)
- Interconnections for 14 instruments (1965)
- Random Rotated for 4 wind instruments (1965)
- Two Fragments for violin and piano (1966)
- Mutatis Mutandis for 6 players (1968)
- Per Se, chamber concerto for violin and 7 instruments (1969)
- preFIX-FIX-sufFIX for bassoon, horn and cello (1971)
- Squares & Symbols, Exits and Traps for keyboard and 1 to 3 wind and/or strings (1971)
- Bug Piece with live insect notation (1972)
- The Hidden Melody (Nigun Haganuz) for cello and French horn (1977)
- Brazilian Birdwhistle Event for Brazilian bird-whistle set (1980)
- Trio, for clarinet, cello and piano (1982)
- Three Jazz Moods, for solo trumpet and saxophone, and chamber ensemble with rhythm section (1982)
- Nine Branches of the Olive Tree, for recorders, bass clarinet, guitar and percussion (1984)
- M. My Dear, a ballad for jazz violin, guitar and bass (1985)
- Duo for flute and cello (1991)
- Five Pieces for Three Players for soprano saxophone, clarinet and marimba (1994)
- Playing for Peace for three-part violin ensemble (1994)
- Loose Connections for violin, clarinet and double bass (1996)
- Marrakesh Bop for microtonal flute and guitar (1999)
- Trio for violin, cello and piano (2001)
- My Main Squeeze for trumpet, accordion and cello (2000)
- Visions of Y for viola and piano (2002)
- Psalm for a melody instrument and piano, completion of an unfinished composition by Alexander U. Boskovich (2006)
- Bayannayab (Choral) for two bayans or accordions (2006)
- Note Traffic for violin and cello (2008)
- Bayanette for two bayans (accordions) and piano (2009)
- Suite for mandolin and accordion (2011)
- Two Alleys in Old Tel-Aviv for string quartet (2013)
- Aprés Rameau: Les Poulets de Mequon/The Chickens of Mequon for 2 pianos (2013)
- Aprés Rameau: Les Poulets de Mequon/The Chickens of Mequon for bayan (accordion) and piano (2014)
- Summer Ostinato for two accordions (2015)
- Tandem Piece for horn and accordion or accordion and piano (2015)
- The Center Does Not Hold for saxophone quartet (2016)

== Chamber music with voice ==
- Rubayat, song for voice and cello, text: Omar Khayyam (1958)
- Spheres for soprano and 10 instruments, text: Yehuda Amichai (1963)
- Incantations for voice, keyboard, and interior piano, text: W.H.Auden (1964)
- Foregroundmusic for 6 instruments and speaker, for a poem by A. Ginsberg (1965)
- At the End of the Parade, six poems by William Carlos Williams for baritone and six players (1974).
- Eros Reminisced, song cycle for singer/pianist, text: Constantine P. Cavafy (1981)
- "Augentanz" (Eyedance) and "Galgenlied" (Hangman's Song) from Celan Ensembles for tenor and instruments, text Paul Celan (1986)
- "In Madness There Is Order" from Celan Ensembles, for voice, projections and synthesizers, text: Paul Celan (1988)
- "Spiegeltanz" (Mirrordance) from Celan Ensembles, for voice, horn, and 2 marimbas, text: Paul Celan (1989)
- The Bogen Songs, six pieces for voice, flute, clarinet in B♭, violoncello and accordion, text: Don Bogen (2010)

== Orchestra and concertante ==
- Mirkamim, textures of sound for large orchestra, (1967)
- Concerto for Audience and Orchestra, with audience operated portable radios (1971)
- Five Songs for Tenor and Orchestra text: W.C. Williams. (1976–77)
- Seven Late Spring Pieces for Orchestra (1979)
- Concertino for Violin and Chamber Orchestra (1980)
- Exit Music At Century's End for chamber orchestra (1995)
- Piano Concerto for solo piano and 15 instruments (2002)
- Rhapsody for alto saxophone and wind ensemble (2005)
- Nuances Argentées (Shades of Silver) for recorded voice and flute orchestra of 24 players (2006)
- Plus Avec Moins (PAM) – More From Less(MFL) for solo accordion and 24 flutes (2012)

== Choir ==
- Mishnayot for solo voices and choir, text: Jewish prayer book (1961).
- Psukey Dezimra for solo voices and choir, text: Jewish prayer book (1961)
- The Chain of Proverbs cantata for youth, text: Ibn Zabara (1962)
- Coheleth, environment with mobile choir, microphones, wireless microphones and voice controlled filters, text: Ecclesiastes (1970)
- Dawn for mixed choir, text: Arthur Rimbaud (1970)
- Departure for nine voices and five instruments, text: Arthur Rimbaud (1972)
- A Noiseless Patient Spider for women's choir or eight solo voices, text: Walt Whitman (1975)
- Tombeau de Satie in memory of Thomas Trobaugh, text: Dona Nobis Pacem (1979)
- Le Campane di Leopardi for mixed choir and tuned glasses, text: Giacomo Leopardi (1979)
- Yigdal for cantor and choir followed by an organ variation, text: Hebrew prayer book (1985)
- Three Hebrew Aphorisms from the Mishna and the Talmud for five-part unaccompanied mixed choir (2007)
- The Wheel of Light(Galgal Haorot) for three choral or solo voices, text: Rabbi Naftali Hertz of Bacharach (2014)
- Mayeem (Water) for five-part mixed chorus (SSATB), harmonicas and Melodicas (2016)

== Theater pieces and dance ==
- Wraphap a theatre piece for actress, amplified aluminum sheet and Yannachord (1969)
- Houdini's Ninth, a theatre piece for a double bass and escape artist (1969)
- The Urbana (IL) Christal Lake Park Gathering for any number of mallet players (1968)
- Autopiano, or Piano Minus Pianist for an actor and piano (1970)
- The Vestibule Peep-In-Pipe-Out for a caged performer with an FM transmitter (1970)
- Attic Songs and Betweens, electronic music for dance (1975)
- American Sonorama, music for a ballet by Anna Nassif (1975–76)
- The Decline and Fall of the Sonata in B-flat, a musicule for actors and pianists (1970–76)
- Three Michael and Nancy Pieces for dancer and percussion (1978)
- Genesis, music for a dance piece by Anna Nassif (1979)
- All Our Women, chamber opera, text: Yehuda Yannay (1981)
- Tableau One: "...in sleep one often finds solutions..." (from Journey to Orgonon) for actor, projections and synthesizers (1992)
- Go Fearing for solo voice for "Geometry of Aloneness," a multimedia work by Marie Mellott (1996)
- "Traum ist von Tat nicht so verschieden..." (Dream and action are not so apart...) for tape and speaker (1998)
- Insomnia in Havana, a theater piece for percussionist/actor, live electronics and projections, text: Virgilio Piñera (2005)
- Midwest Mythologist, theater piece for a pianist, text and musical sources:Steve Nelson-Raney (2012)
- Beware of Poison Mushrooms! Seven Illustrated Aphorisms and Short Stories by Roland Lampe (2013)

== Film, video, intermedia ==
- Houdini's Ninth – a film. black and white and color, 16 mm film with sound produced in collaboration with Emory J. Clark (1973)
- Charcoal and Pastel Music 1 to 52 visual music in form of a series of drawings (1979)
- Jidyll, a film with music by Dick Blau and Yehuda Yannay (1984–90)
- Windsuck, sound sculpture created in collaboration with Steve Pevnick (1985)
- The Oranur Experiment Part I: "Journey to Orgonon", a music video, in collaboration with Jerome Fortier (1991)
- Violoncello Solo for "I can't fathom it" for projection theater by Marie Mellott (1993)
- Wilhelm Reich: Journey to Orgonon a documentary opera on CD-ROM in collaboration with Jerome Fortier (1997)
- Percussion Fountain, sound sculpture in collaboration with Stephen Pevnick (1998)
- Radiant, Inner Light for speaker, musical saw, metal percussion, percussion fountain, projections and calligrams Percussion instruments built in collaboration with Stephen Pevnick, calligrams created in collaboration with Marie Mellott, text: Rabbi Naftali Hertz of Bacharach (1998–2000)
- Only Gestures, electronic music for a video installation piece by Marie Mellott (2006)
- A Noiseless Patient Spider for women's choir or eight solo voices a cappella, dance video version: Peter Sparling, text: Walt Whitman (2010)

== Electronic music ==
- Electronic Music (1964–65).
  - "Study #1
  - "Study #2
  - "Study #3
  - "Phonomontage Pour Thérèse"
- Milwaukee Brew Project, environmental tape composition on sounds of Milwaukee (1979)
- Three Visions of the Age, collaborative composition for digital synthesizers and instruments with Jon Welstead and Joel Thome (1985)
