= List of symphonies in G-sharp minor =

The list of symphonies in G♯ minor includes:

- An early abandoned work by Marc Blitzstein
- Symphony in G♯ minor by Elliot Goldenthal
- Symphony No. 17, Op. 41 (1936–7) by Nikolai Myaskovsky
