= Lists of compositions =

This is a list of lists of musical compositions.

== By composer ==
=== A ===
- List of compositions by Aaron Copland
- List of compositions by Agostino Steffani
- List of compositions by Aivars Kalējs
- List of compositions by Akil Mark Koci
- List of compositions by Alan Bush
- List of compositions by Alan Hovhaness
- List of compositions by Alban Berg
- List of compositions by Albert Dietrich
- List of compositions by Alexander Agricola
- List of compositions by Alexander Borodin
- List of compositions by Alexander Dreyschock
- List of compositions by Alexander Glazunov
- List of compositions by Alexander Mackenzie
- List of compositions by Alexander Mosolov
- List of compositions by Alexander Scriabin
- List of compositions by Alexander Tcherepnin
- List of compositions by Alexander von Zemlinsky
- List of compositions by Alexandre Goria
- List of compositions by Alfred Schnittke
- List of compositions by Alois Hába
- List of compositions by Amy Beach
- List of compositions by André Previn
- List of compositions by Anton Bruckner
- List of organ compositions by Anton Bruckner
- List of piano compositions by Anton Bruckner
- List of compositions by Anton Diabelli
- List of compositions by Anton Reicha
- List of compositions by Anton Rubinstein
- List of compositions by Anton Webern
- List of compositions by Antonín Dvořák
- List of compositions by Antonín Dvořák by genre
- List of compositions by Antonio Salieri
- List of compositions by Antonio Vivaldi
- List of compositions by Aram Khachaturian
- List of compositions by Arlene Sierra
- List of compositions by Arnold Bax
- List of compositions by Arnold Schoenberg
- List of compositions by Artemy Vedel
- List of compositions by Arthur Bliss
- List of compositions by Arthur Honegger
- List of compositions by Arthur Sullivan
- List of compositions by Arvo Pärt
- List of compositions by Aulis Sallinen

=== B ===
- List of compositions by Bedřich Smetana
- List of compositions by Béla Bartók
- List of compositions by Benjamin Britten
- List of compositions by Betsy Jolas
- List of compositions by Bill McGlaughlin
- List of compositions by Bohuslav Martinů
- List of compositions by Borys Lyatoshynsky
- List of compositions by Božidar Kantušer
- List of compositions by Bruno Maderna

=== C ===
- List of compositions by Camille Saint-Saëns
- List of compositions by Carl Czerny
- List of compositions by Carl Loewe
- List of compositions by Carl Maria von Weber
- List of compositions by Carl Nielsen
- List of compositions by Carl Philipp Emanuel Bach
- List of compositions by Carlo Gesualdo
- List of compositions by Carlos Chávez
- List of compositions by Carlos Salzedo
- List of compositions by Caroline Shaw
- List of compositions by Cécile Chaminade
- List of compositions by César Cui
- List of compositions by César Franck
- List of compositions by Charles Gounod
- List of compositions by Charles Ives
- List of compositions by Charles Wuorinen
- List of compositions by Charles-Valentin Alkan
- List of compositions by Charles Villiers Stanford
- List of compositions by Christian Sinding
- List of compositions by Christoph Willibald Gluck
- List of compositions by Clara Schumann
- List of compositions by Claude Debussy
- List of compositions by Claudio Monteverdi
- List of compositions by Clémence de Grandval
- List of compositions by Constant Lambert

=== D ===
- List of compositions by Dag Wirén
- List of compositions by Dane Rudhyar
- List of compositions by Darius Milhaud
- List of compositions by Daron Hagen
- List of compositions by David Maslanka
- List of compositions by Dieterich Buxtehude
- List of compositions by Dmitry Kabalevsky
- List of compositions by Dmitri Shostakovich
- List of compositions by Domenico Cimarosa
- List of compositions by Donald Tovey

=== E ===
- List of compositions by Édouard Lalo
- List of compositions by Eduard Strauss
- List of compositions by Edvard Grieg
- List of compositions by Edward Elgar
- List of compositions by Einojuhani Rautavaara
- List of compositions by Elisabeth Lutyens
- List of compositions by Elliott Carter
- List of compositions by Elmer Bernstein
- List of compositions by Emilie Mayer
- List of compositions by Emilio Pujol
- List of compositions by Emmanuel Chabrier
- List of compositions by Enrique Granados
- List of compositions by Eric Coates
- List of compositions by Erich Wolfgang Korngold
- List of compositions by Erik Chisholm
- List of compositions by Erik Satie
- List of compositions by Erkki Melartin
- List of compositions by Ernest Bloch
- List of compositions by Ernest Chausson
- List of compositions by Ernst Krenek
- List of compositions by Ethel Smyth
- List of compositions by Eugene Aynsley Goossens
- List of compositions by Eugène Bozza

=== F ===
- List of compositions by F. Melius Christiansen
- List of compositions by Fabio Vacchi
- List of compositions by Fanny Hensel
- List of compositions by Faye-Ellen Silverman
- List of compositions by Felix Blumenfeld
- List of compositions by Felix Mendelssohn
- List of solo piano compositions by Felix Mendelssohn
- List of compositions by Felix Weingartner
- List of compositions by Ferdinando Carulli
- List of compositions by Fernando Sor
- List of compositions by Ferruccio Busoni
- List of compositions by Francis Poulenc
- List of solo piano compositions by Francis Poulenc
- List of compositions by Francisco Tárrega
- List of compositions by Franco Donatoni
- List of compositions by François-Adrien Boieldieu
- List of compositions by François Couperin
- List of compositions by Frank Bridge
- List of compositions by Franz Benda
- List of compositions by Franz Krommer
- List of compositions by Franz Lachner
- List of compositions by Franz Liszt
- List of compositions by Franz Schubert
- List of compositions by Franz Schubert (1810)
- List of compositions by Franz Schubert (1811)
- List of compositions by Franz Schubert (1812)
- List of compositions by Franz Schubert (1813)
- List of compositions by Franz Schubert (1814)
- List of compositions by Franz Schubert (1815)
- List of compositions by Franz Schubert (1816)
- List of compositions by Franz Schubert (1817)
- List of compositions by Franz Schubert (1818)
- List of compositions by Franz Schubert (1819)
- List of compositions by Franz Schubert (1820)
- List of compositions by Franz Schubert (1821)
- List of compositions by Franz Schubert (1822)
- List of compositions by Franz Schubert (1823)
- List of compositions by Franz Schubert (1824)
- List of compositions by Franz Schubert (1825)
- List of compositions by Franz Schubert (1826)
- List of compositions by Franz Schubert (1827)
- List of compositions by Franz Schubert (1828)
- List of compositions by Franz Schubert (arrangements)
- List of compositions by Franz Schubert (copies)
- List of compositions by Franz Schubert (doubtful and spurious)
- List of compositions by Franz Schubert (undated)
- List of compositions by Franz Schubert by genre
- List of compositions by Frederic Austin
- List of compositions by Frédéric Chopin by genre
- List of compositions by Frédéric Chopin by opus number
- Miscellaneous compositions (Chopin)
- List of compositions by Frederic Rzewski
- List of compositions by Frederick Delius
- List of compositions by Frederik Magle
- List of compositions by Friedrich Kalkbrenner
- List of compositions by Friedrich Kiel
- List of compositions by Friedrich Kuhlau
- List of compositions by Fritz Kreisler

=== G ===
- List of compositions by Gabriel Fauré
- List of compositions by Geirr Tveitt
- List of compositions by Geoffrey Bush
- List of compositions by Georg Böhm
- List of compositions by George Enescu
- List of compositions by George Frideric Handel
- List of compositions by George Gershwin
- List of compositions by George Onslow
- List of compositions by George Whitefield Chadwick
- List of compositions by Georges Bizet
- List of compositions by Gerald Finzi
- List of compositions by Germaine Tailleferre
- List of compositions by Giacinto Scelsi
- List of compositions by Giacomo Puccini
- List of compositions by Gioachino Rossini
- List of compositions by Giovanni Bottesini
- List of compositions by Giovanni Pierluigi da Palestrina
- List of compositions by Giovanni Sgambati
- List of compositions by Girolamo Frescobaldi
- List of compositions by Giuseppe Corsi
- List of compositions by Giuseppe Verdi
- List of compositions by Glenn Gould
- List of compositions by Gottfried Heinrich Stölzel
- List of compositions by Graham Waterhouse
- List of compositions by Gregory Short
- List of compositions by Guillaume de Machaut
- List of compositions by Guillaume Lekeu
- List of compositions by Gustav Holst
- List of compositions by Gustav Mahler
- List of compositions by György Kurtág
- List of compositions by György Ligeti

=== H ===
- List of compositions by Hans Werner Henze
- List of compositions by Harrison Birtwistle
- List of compositions by Heinrich Schütz
- List of compositions by Heitor Villa-Lobos
- List of compositions by Henri Dutilleux
- List of compositions by Henri Herz
- List of compositions by Henri Vieuxtemps
- List of compositions by Henrique Oswald
- List of compositions by Henry Cowell
- List of compositions by Henry Litolff
- List of compositions by Henry Purcell
- List of compositions by Henryk Górecki
- List of compositions by Herbert Howells
- List of compositions by Howard Skempton
- List of compositions by Hubert Parry

=== I ===
- List of compositions by Iannis Xenakis
- List of compositions by Ignaz Brüll
- List of compositions by Ignaz Moscheles
- List of compositions by Igor Stravinsky
- List of compositions by Imogen Holst
- List of compositions by Isaac Albéniz

=== J ===
- List of compositions by Jacques Champion de Chambonnières
- List of compositions by Jacques Offenbach
- List of compositions by Jake Heggie
- List of compositions by James Hotchkiss Rogers
- List of compositions by James MacMillan
- List of compositions by James Scott
- List of compositions by Jan Dismas Zelenka
- List of compositions by Jan Kalivoda
- List of compositions by Jan Ladislav Dussek
- List of compositions by Jane Joseph
- List of compositions by Jean Françaix
- List of compositions by Jean Guillou
- List of compositions by Jean Langlais
- List of compositions by Jean Sibelius
- List of compositions by Jean-Baptiste Lully
- List of compositions by Jean-Claude Éloy
- List of compositions by Jennifer Higdon
- List of compositions by Jenő Hubay
- List of compositions by Joachim Raff
- List of compositions by Joaquín Turina
- List of compositions by Johann Adolph Hasse
- List of compositions by Johann Baptist Wanhal
- List of compositions by Johann Christian Bach
- List of compositions by Johann David Heinichen
- List of compositions by Johann Jakob Froberger
- List of compositions by Johann Joachim Quantz
- List of compositions by Johann Ludwig Krebs
- List of compositions by Johann Nepomuk Hummel
- List of compositions by Johann Pachelbel
- List of compositions by Johann Peter Pixis
- List of compositions by Johann Sebastian Bach
- List of compositions by Johann Sebastian Bach printed during his lifetime
- List of keyboard and lute compositions by Johann Sebastian Bach
- List of organ compositions by Johann Sebastian Bach
- List of transcriptions of compositions by Johann Sebastian Bach
- List of compositions by Johann Strauss II
- List of compositions by Johanna Senfter
- List of compositions by Johannes Brahms
- List of compositions by John Cage
- List of compositions by John Corigliano
- List of compositions by John Philip Sousa
- List of compositions by John Woolrich
- List of compositions by Jörg Widmann
- List of compositions by José Vianna da Motta
- List of compositions by Josef Bohuslav Foerster
- List of compositions by Josef Suk
- List of compositions by Josef Tal
- List of compositions by Joseph Haydn
- List of solo piano compositions by Joseph Haydn
- List of compositions by Joseph Holbrooke
- List of compositions by Joseph Martin Kraus
- List of compositions by Josquin des Prez
- List of compositions by Juan Crisóstomo Arriaga
- List of compositions by Juan María Solare
- List of compositions by Jules Massenet
- List of compositions by Julius Harrison

=== K ===
- List of compositions by Kaija Saariaho
- List of compositions by Kaikhosru Shapurji Sorabji
- List of compositions by Kalevi Aho
- List of compositions by Karlheinz Stockhausen
- List of compositions by Karol Szymanowski
- List of compositions by Katherine Hoover
- List of compositions by Krzysztof Penderecki
- List of compositions by Kurt Atterberg

=== L ===
- List of compositions by Larry Thomas Bell
- List of compositions by Lars-Erik Larsson
- List of compositions by Leevi Madetoja
- List of compositions by Leo Brouwer
- List of compositions by Léo Delibes
- List of solo piano compositions by Leo Ornstein
- List of compositions by Leo Sowerby
- List of compositions by Leonard Bernstein
- List of compositions by Leopold Koželuch
- List of compositions by Leoš Janáček
- List of compositions by Lera Auerbach
- List of compositions by Libby Larsen
- List of compositions by Lord Berners
- List of compositions by Lorenzo Perosi
- List of compositions by Lou Harrison
- List of compositions by Louis Couperin
- List of compositions by Louis Spohr
- List of compositions by Louis Vierne
- List of compositions by Luciano Berio
- List of compositions by Ludwig van Beethoven
- List of compositions by Luigi Boccherini
- List of compositions by Luigi Nono
- List of compositions by Luise Adolpha Le Beau
- List of compositions by Lukas Foss

=== M ===
- List of compositions by Malcolm Arnold
- List of compositions by Malcolm Williamson
- List of compositions by Manuel de Falla
- List of compositions by Marcel Dupré
- List of compositions by Maria Szymanowska
- List of compositions by Mario Castelnuovo-Tedesco
- List of compositions by Martin Lohse
- List of compositions by Matteo Carcassi
- List of compositions by Maurice Ravel
- List of compositions by Mauricio Kagel
- List of compositions by Mauro Giuliani
- List of compositions by Max Bruch
- List of compositions by Max Reger
- List of compositions by Michael Daugherty
- List of compositions by Michael Finnissy
- List of compositions by Michael Haydn
- List of compositions by Michael Tippett
- List of compositions by Michael Torke
- List of compositions by Mieczysław Weinberg
- List of compositions by Mikhail Glinka
- List of compositions by Mikhail Ippolitov-Ivanov
- List of compositions by Miklós Rózsa
- List of compositions by Mily Balakirev
- List of compositions by Modest Mussorgsky
- List of compositions by Moritz Moszkowski
- List of compositions by Morton Feldman
- List of compositions by Muzio Clementi

=== N ===
- List of compositions by Nancy Van de Vate
- List of compositions by Ned Rorem
- List of compositions by Niccolò Paganini
- List of compositions by Nicolae Bretan
- List of compositions by Niels Gade
- List of compositions by Niels Viggo Bentzon
- List of compositions by Nikolai Kapustin
- List of compositions by Nikolai Medtner
- List of compositions by Nikolai Myaskovsky
- List of compositions by Nikolai Rimsky-Korsakov
- List of compositions by Nikos Skalkottas
- List of compositions by Nino Rota

=== O ===
- List of compositions by Olivier Messiaen
- List of compositions by Orlando Gibbons
- List of compositions by Otar Taktakishvili
- List of compositions by Othmar Schoeck
- List of compositions by Otto Albert Tichý
- List of compositions by Ottorino Respighi

=== P ===
- List of compositions by P. D. Q. Bach
- List of compositions by Paul Hindemith
- List of compositions by Paul Juon
- List of compositions by Paul Manz
- List of compositions by Paul Moravec
- List of compositions by Percy Grainger
- List of compositions by Percy Pitt
- List of compositions by Péter Eötvös
- List of compositions by Peter Maxwell Davies
- List of compositions by Peter Warlock
- List of compositions by Philip Glass
- List of compositions by Pierre Boulez
- List of compositions by Pierre Rode
- List of compositions by Pyotr Ilyich Tchaikovsky

=== R ===
- List of compositions by Ralph Vaughan Williams
- List of compositions by Rebecca Clarke
- List of compositions by Reynaldo Hahn
- List of compositions by Richard Strauss
- List of compositions by Richard Wagner
- List of compositions by Robert Moevs
- List of compositions by Robert Schumann
- List of solo piano compositions by Robert Schumann
- List of vocal compositions by Robert Schumann
- List of compositions by Robert Simpson
- List of compositions by Robert Volkmann

=== S ===
- List of compositions by Salvatore Sciarrino
- List of compositions by Samuel Barber
- List of compositions by Scott Joplin
- List of compositions by Seán Doherty
- List of compositions by Sergei Bortkiewicz
- List of compositions by Sergei Prokofiev
- List of compositions by Sergei Rachmaninoff
- List of compositions by Sergei Taneyev
- List of compositions by Sigismond Thalberg
- List of compositions by Silvestre Revueltas
- List of compositions by Simon Mayr
- List of compositions by Stanisław Moniuszko
- List of compositions by Stefan Wolpe
- List of compositions by Swan Hennessy
- List of compositions by Sylvius Leopold Weiss

=== T ===
- List of compositions by Teresa Carreño
- List of compositions by Theodor Kirchner
- List of compositions by Thomas Adès
- List of compositions by Thomas Arne
- List of compositions by Thomas de Hartmann
- List of compositions by Thomas Tallis
- List of compositions by Tielman Susato
- List of compositions by Tobias Picker
- List of compositions by Tomáš Svoboda
- List of compositions by Tomaso Albinoni
- List of compositions by Tōru Takemitsu

=== V ===
- List of compositions by Vagn Holmboe
- List of compositions by Victor Herbert
- List of compositions by Viktor Kosenko
- List of compositions by Vincent d'Indy

=== W ===
- List of compositions by Walter Carroll
- List of compositions by Wilhelm Kienzl
- List of compositions by William Bolcom
- List of compositions by William Boyce
- List of compositions by William Byrd
- List of compositions by William Sterndale Bennett
- List of compositions by William Walton
- List of compositions by Witold Lutosławski
- List of compositions by Wolfgang Amadeus Mozart
- List of solo piano compositions by Wolfgang Amadeus Mozart
- List of compositions by Wolfgang Rihm

=== Y ===
- List of compositions by Yehuda Yannay
- List of compositions by York Bowen

=== Z ===
- List of compositions by Zdeněk Fibich
- List of compositions by Zygmunt Stojowski

== By instrument ==
- List of compositions for accordion and string quartet
- List of compositions for cello and orchestra
- List of compositions for cello and organ
- List of compositions for cello and piano
- List of compositions for double bass
- List of compositions for electronic keyboard
- List of compositions for flute
- List of compositions for guitar
- List of compositions for harp
- List of compositions for horn
- List of compositions for keyboard and orchestra
- List of compositions for organ
- List of compositions for piano and orchestra
- List of compositions for piano duo
- List of compositions for saxophone, piano and percussion
- List of compositions for two violins
- List of compositions for viola: A to B
- List of compositions for viola: C to E
- List of compositions for viola: F to H
- List of compositions for viola: I to K
- List of compositions for viola: L to N
- List of compositions for viola: O to R
- List of compositions for viola: S
- List of compositions for viola: T to Z
- List of compositions for violin and orchestra

== Other ==
- List of dodecaphonic and serial compositions
- List of major/minor compositions
- List of atonal compositions
- List of jazz-influenced classical compositions
- List of unpublished musical compositions
- Catalogues of classical compositions

== See also ==
- List of lists of lists
