= The Russians are coming (disambiguation) =

"The Russians are coming" is a famous phrase allegedly uttered in 1949 by the then United States Secretary of Defense, James Forrestal.

The Russians are coming may also refer to:

== Film and television ==
- The Russians Are Coming the Russians Are Coming, a 1966 American comedy film
- The Russians Are Coming (film), a 1968 East German war drama film directed by Heiner Carow
- "The Russians Are Coming" (Only Fools and Horses), a 1981 television episode

== Music ==
- "The Russians Are Coming (instrumental)", by Jamaican musician Val Bennett, a 1968 cover of "Take Five"
- The Russians are Coming (Bram Tchaikovsky album), a 1980 album by Bram Tchaikovsky (alternate title: Pressure)
- Ryssen kommer, a 2015 album by Swedish punk rock band Rövsvett
- Die Russen kommen, a piano composition by Robert Volkmann
- "The Russians Are Coming! The Russians Are Coming!", a 1966 single by the International Submarine Band

== Other uses ==
- The Russians Are Coming (Русские идут), a four-book series by science fiction author Yuri Nikitin
