= List of compositions by Lou Harrison =

Lou Harrison composed in a wide array of musical styles and for various ensembles. The following list is all of his compositions sorted by both genre and chronology.

== Works ==
=== Chamber works ===
- Adagio (c. 1934–36) for flute, harmonium, strings, and piano
- Adagio (c. 1934–36) for flute, two mandolins, guitar, and cello
- Aubade for Gabriel (c. 1934–36) for chorus, strings, and percussion
- The Geography of Heaven (1935) for 4 violins, 2 violas, 2 celli, 2 basses, and quarter-tone organ
- Midnoon (1936) for strings and harp
- Concerto for Flute and Percussion (1939) for flute and percussionist
- The Perilous Chapel (1948), mixed quartet
- Solstice (1949), octet (flute, oboe, trumpet, 2 cellos, string bass, celesta, tack piano)
- Suite for Cello and Harp (1949)
- Seven Pastorales (1949 - 1951) for chamber orchestra
- Songs in the Forest (1951), mixed quartet
- Praise for the Beauty of Hummingbirds (1951) for mixed quintet
- Serenado Por Gitaro (1952) for guitar solo
- Concerto for Violin and Percussion Orchestra (1959)
- Concerto in Slendro (1961)
- At the Tomb of Charles Ives (1963) for chamber orchestra
- Pacifika Rondo (1963) for chamber orchestra
- Concerto for Organ with Percussion Orchestra (1972–3) for organ with ten person ensemble of celesta, piano, glockenspiel, vibraphone, tubular chimes, and percussion quintet on various unpitched standard and "found" percussion instruments.
- Serenade for Guitar with optional Percussion (1978) for mixed duo, guitar solo
- String Quartet Set (1978)
- Suites for Cello and String Orchestra (1984, rev. 1990)
- Varied Trio (1986) for rice bowls, violin, vibraphone, and piano (written for the Abel-Steinberg-Winant Trio)
- Ariadne (1987), flute and percussionist
- Grand Duo (1988) for violin and piano
- Suite for Violoncello and Piano (1995)
- New First Suite for Strings (1995) for string orchestra
- Rhymes with Silver (1996) for violoncello, ensemble and mixed quintet
- Concerto for Pipa with String Orchestra (1997) for pipa and string orchestra
- Suite for Violin with String Orchestra (1997)
- Scenes from Nek Chand (2002) for guitar solo

=== Orchestral works ===
- Fore-piece to St. George or After the Dragon (1934–36) for orchestra
- [untitled] (1936) for orchestra
- Overture for a Tragic, Heroic Drama (1936) for orchestra
- Fugue (1937) for orchestra
- Symphony No. 2 'Elegiac' (1942)
- Canticle #6 (1942)
- Symphony On G (No. 1) (1947)
- Political Primer (1947) for solo baritone, choir and orchestra
- Suite from Marriage at the Eiffel Tower (1961)
- Music for Violin with Various Instruments, European, Asian, and African (1967), string solo and orchestra
- Symphony No. 3 (1982) For the Cabrillo Music Festival
- Piano Concerto (1983–85), for piano tuned in Kirnberger #2 (a form of well temperament) and orchestra
- Last Symphony (No. 4) (1990, rev. 1995)
- A Parade for MTT (1995)

=== Percussion works ===
- ”Bomba” (1939) - Quintet
- ”Fifth Simfony” (1939) - Quartet
- ”Tributes to Charon: Counterdance in the Spring” (1939), “Passage Through Darkness” (1982) - Trio
- ”Oriental” (c. 1940) - Trio
- ”Rune” (1940)
- ”Canticle No. 1” (1940) - Quintet
- ”Concerto for Violin and Percussion Orchestra” (1940–1959) - Percussion Quintet + Violinist
- ”Labyrinth No. 3” (1940 or 1941) - 11 Percussionists
- ”Double Music” (in collaboration with John Cage) (1941) - Quartet
- ”The Song of Queztelcoatl” (1941) - Quartet
- ”Simfony No. 13” (1941) - Quartet
- ”The Drums of Orpheus” (1941–1969) - 11 Percussionists
- ”In Praise of Johnny Appleseed” (1942) - Trio
- ”Canticle No. 3” (1942) - Percussion Quintet + Guitarist
- ”Fugue” (1942) - Quartet
- ”Suite” (1942) - Qunitet
- ”Canticle No. 5” (1942) - Quartet
- ”Recording Piece for Concert Boobams, Talking drums, with other percussion” (1955)
- ”Solo for Tony Cirone” (1972)
- ”Concerto Organ and Percussion Orchestra” (1972–1973)

=== Vocal works ===
- May Rain (1931) poem by Elsa Gidlow, for female voice
- Mass to Saint Anthony (1939), mixed chorus and ensemble
- Sanctus (1940), for contralto and piano
- Alma Redemptoris Mater (1949–51), low voice and ensemble
- Vestiunt Silve (1951), for soprano and four instruments
- Air from Rapunzel (1952–3), high voice and ensemble
- Strict Songs (1955), baritone solo, chorus and chamber orchestra
- Orpheus (1969), soloists, mixed chorus and ensemble
- La Koro Sutro (1970), mixed chorus and gamelan, mixed chorus and ensemble
- The Foreman's Song Tune (1983) for chorus and Javanese gamelan
- Ketawang Wellington (1983) for voice and Javanese gamelan
- Three Songs (1985), men's chorus and ensemble

=== Keyboard works ===
- Adagio (1934–36) for piano solo
- Choral (1934–36) for organ solo
- Choral Preludes (1934–36) for clavichord
- Dance (1934–36) for two pianos
- Dance for a Little Girl (1934–36) for piano solo
- Feelingly (1934–36) for piano solo
- Gothic Piece (1934–36) for harpsichord solo
- Three Dances of Conflict for Carol Beals (1936) for piano solo
- Project No. 2 (1936) for piano solo
- Ground in E Minor (1936) for piano solo
- Hill-Rise (1936) for piano solo
- Tribunal (1936) for piano four-hands
- Sonata #1 (1936) for piano solo
- Sonata #2 (1937) for piano solo
- Slow (1937) for organ solo
- Simphony for Organ (1937) for organ solo
- A Bit of Rotten Chopin on Order of J. Cleghorn (1937) for piano solo
- Opening Dance (1937) for piano solo
- R. A. H.'s Extatic Moment (1937) for piano solo
- Third Sonata for Piano (1938) for piano solo
- Usonian Set (1939) for piano solo
- Reel (Homage to Henry Cowell) (1939) for piano solo
- Exposition of a Cause (1941) for piano solo
- Music for the River-Mechant's Wife (1942) for piano solo
- Gigue and Musette (1943) for piano solo
- Six Sonatas for Cembalo (1943) for piano (or harpsichord) solo
- Serenade in C (1944) for piano solo
- A 12-Tone Morning After to Amuse Henry (1944–45) for piano solo
- Waltz in C (1945) for piano solo
- Triphony (1945) for piano solo
- Praises for Michael the Archangel (1946–47) for organ solo
- Homage to Milhaud (1948) for piano solo
- Little Suite for Piano (1949) for piano solo
- Chorales for Spring (1951) for piano solo
- Io and Prometheus (1951) for piano solo
- Double Canon (to Carl Ruggles) (1951) for piano solo
- Festival Dance (1951) for two pianos
- A Thought on the Anniversary of Katherine Litz and Charles Oscar (1951) for piano solo
- A Little Gamelon for Katherine Litz to Teach By (1952) for piano solo
- Waltz for Evelyn Hinrichsen (1978) for piano (or harp) solo
- Estampie (1981) for organ solo
- A Summerfield Set (1988) for piano (or harpsichord) solo
- Pedal Sonata (1989) for organ solo

=== Gamelan works ===
- Suite for Violin with American Gamelan (1973)
- Gending Samuel (1976) for Javanese gamelan
- Gending Pak Cokro (1976) for Javanese gamelan
- Buburan Robert (1976) for Javanese gamelan
- Lancaran Daniel (1976) for Javanese gamelan
- Lagu Sociseknum (1976) for Javanese gamelan
- Gending Paul (1977) for Javanese gamelan
- Gending Jody or Lancaran Jody (1977) for Javanese gamelan
- Music for the Turning of a Sculpture by Pamela Boden (1977) for Javanese gamelan
- Main Bersama-Sama (Playing Together) (1978) for Gamelan Degung and French horn
- Serenade for Betty Freeman and Franco Asseto (1978) for Gamelan Degung and suling
- Threnody for Carlos Chavez (1979) for Gamelan Degung and viola
- Gending Bill or Gending William Colvig (1980) for Javanese gamelan
- Lancaran Samuel (1981) for Javanese gamelan
- Gending Alexander (1981) for Javanese gamelan
- Ladrang Epikuros (1981) for Javanese gamelan
- Gending Hephaestus (1981) for Javanese gamelan
- Gending Hermes (1981) for Javanese gamelan
- Gending Demeter (1981) for Javanese gamelan
- Gending in Honor of the Poet Virgil (1981) for Javanese gamelan
- Double Concerto (1981–82) for violin, cello and Javanese gamelan
- Gending Claude (1982) for Javanese gamelan
- Lancaran Molly (1982) for Javanese gamelan
- Gending Dennis (1982) for Javanese gamelan
- Gending Pindar (1982) for Javanese gamelan
- Gending in Honor of Herakles (1982) for Javanese gamelan
- Beyond the Far Blue Mountains (1983) for Javanese gamelan
- Gending Vincent (1983) for Javanese gamelan
- Gending in Honor of James and Joel (Devotions) (1983) for Javanese gamelan and two suling
- Lagu Lagu Thomasan (1983) for Cirebon gamelan
- Lagu Cirebon (1983) for Cirebon gamelan
- Lagu Victoria (1983) for Cirebon gamelan
- For the Pleasure of Ovid's Changes (1983) for Javanese gamelan
- Gending in Honor of Sinan (1983) for Javanese gamelan
- Gending in Honor of Palladio (1983) for Javanese gamelan
- Lagu Elang Yusuf (1984) for Cirebon gamelan
- Gending in Honor of Max Beckmann (1984) for Javanese gamelan
- Gending Ptolemy (1984) for Javanese gamelan
- Ladrang in Honor of Pak Daliyo (1984) for Javanese gamelan
- Lagu Pa Undang (1985) for Gamelan degung
- Concerto for Piano and Javanese Gamelan (1986–87)
- Round for Jafran Jones (1991) for Balinese gamelan

=== Opera ===
- Rapunzel (1952)
- Young Caesar (1970)
