= List of compositions by William Sterndale Bennett =

Bennett aged about 35

This is a list of compositions by William Sterndale Bennett.

== Piano ==
=== Piano Solo ===
- Capriccio, Op 2
- Three Musical Sketches, Op 10
- Six Studies, Op 11
- Three Impromptus, Op 12
- Sonata No. 1, Op 13
- Three Romances, Op 14
- Fantasia, Op 16
- Three Diversions, as duets, Op 17
- Allegro Grazioso, Op 18
- Suite de Pièces, Op 24
- Rondo piacevole, Op. 25
- Scherzo, Op. 27
- Introductione e pastorale, Rondino, Capriccio Op 28
- Two Characteristic Studies, Op 29
- Tema e Variazione, Op 31
- 30 Preludes and Lessons, Op. 33
- Rondo Pas Triste, pas gai, Op 34
- January and February, Op 36
- Rondeau a la polonaise, Op 37
- Toccata Op 38
- Sonata No 2, The Maid of Orleans, Op. 46

== Chamber music ==
=== Cello and Piano ===
- Sonata Duo for Cello and Piano, Op 32

=== Piano Trio ===
- Chamber Piano Trio in A major, Op. 26

=== Other ===
- String Quartet in G major (1831)
- Piano Sextet in F♯ minor, Op 8

== Orchestral ==
=== Symphonies ===
- Symphony No. 1 in E♭ major (completed 6 April 1832)
- Symphony No. 2 in D minor (1832-33)
- Symphony No. 4 in A minor (1833-1834) (Note: According to Bennet's son, James Robert Sterndale Bennett, the first movement of the Symphony No. 3 was intended to be an Overture in D minor composed in October 1833, however the symphony was abandoned but still numbered.)
- Symphony No. 5 in G minor (1835-36)
- Symphony in G minor, Op 43 (1864)

=== Overtures ===
- Parisina, Op 3
- The Naiades, Op 15
- Die Waldnymphe, Op 20
- Paradise and the Peri, Op 42

=== Piano and Orchestra ===
- Piano Concerto No. 1 in D minor, Op 1
- Piano Concerto No. 2 in E♭, Op 4
- Piano Concerto No. 3 in C minor, Op 9
- Piano Concerto No. 4 in F minor, Op 19 (1838)
- Piano Concerto No. 5 in F minor
- Piano Concerto No. 6 in A minor
- Caprice for Piano and Orchestra, Op 22
- Adagio for Piano and Orchestra

== Choral Music ==
- Pastoral: The May Queen, Op 39
- Sacred Cantata: The Woman of Samaria, Op 44 (Birmingham Festival, 1867)
- Duet: Remember Now Thy Creator
- Exhibition Ode (1862), Op 40
- Cambridge Installation Ode, Op 41
- Now, my God, Let, I beseech Thee
- God is a Spirit
- Several other anthems, Hymn and Psalm tunes

== Songs ==
- Six Songs: first set, Op 23
- Six Songs: second set, Op 35
- Maiden Mine Op 47
- Part song: Come Live With Me
