= List of unpublished musical compositions =

This is a list of notable unpublished works for which an original manuscript or copy is known to exist but for various reasons unpublished, unrecorded, or inaccessible to the public. Usually the manuscript is in the possession of a private owner who is unwilling to share it for viewing, copying, or recording.

== Frédéric Chopin ==
- Valse in B

== Charles Gounod ==
- George Dandin

== Franz Liszt ==
- Klavierstück in E flat S.152a
- Grand Solo caractèristique d'apropos une chansonette de Panseron S.153b (discovered 1987)

== See also ==
- Unfinished creative work#Classical music
