= List of compositions by Carlos Salzedo =

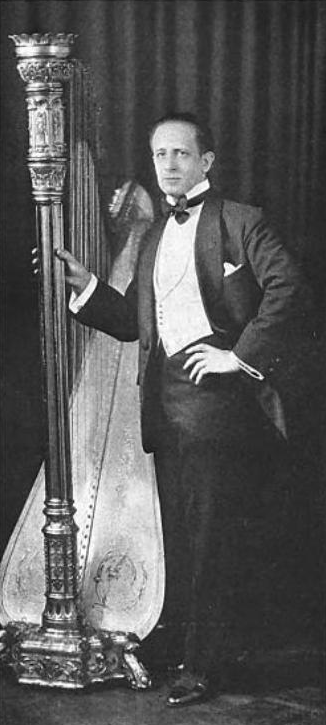
Carlos Salzedo

The following is a list of compositions by Carlos Salzedo (1885–1961). A complete list may be found in Dewey Owens's biography.

== Compositions for cello, flute, piano, trombone, and voice ==
Many early works were published by Costallat, but have since been lost. Titles are followed by year of composition, publisher's name if applicable, and year of publication. Many works have been published more than once, subsequent publisher's names follow that of the original publisher.

- Berceuse for Cello and Piano, Op. 72 (1907) (Costallat 1908)
- Caprice Scherzando for Cello and Piano (1908) (Costallat 1918)
- Invocation for Cello and Piano (1908) (C.G. Roeder)
- Pièce Concertante for Trombone and Piano, Op. 27 (1910) (Evette & Schaeffer, 1910)
- Rivalité de Fleurs for Voice and Piano, Op. 25 (1911) (Costallat)
- Four Choruses in Old Sonata Form for 3 men's voices/choir and harp, organ or piano (1914) (H.W. Gray, 1918)
- Prelude to Olaf Bolm for Piano (1926) (Carl Fischer, 1926)
- Breaking in the New Year for Piano (1935)
- Offriam for Cello (1951)
- Volute and Rondel for Flute (1951) (Albert Andraud, Southern)
- Marya Freund for Piano (1956)
- Enigme for Piano (1960)

== Original Compositions for Harp (alone or with other harps, and other instruments or voice) in chronological order ==
- Ballade, op. 28 (1910) (later revised), Trois Morceaux, No. 1 (Alphonse Leduc, 1914)
- Paraphrase (Cadenza) for Liszt's Second Rhapsody (a solo showpiece or cadenza for orchestral performance) (1910) (G.Schirmer 1959, Lyra)
- Jeux d'Eau (1911) Trois Morceaux, No. 2 (Alphonse Leduc, 1914)
- Variations sǔr un thème dans le style ancien (1911), Trois Morceaux, No. 3 (Alphonse Leduc, 1914) (a later edition revised by Salzedo was published by Lyon & Healy)
- Chanson Chagrine, (1914) (Lyra, 1985)
- Five Preludes for Harp Alone, (1917) (Carl Fischer, 1924) (original title: Pentarhythmie) in order of performance:
  - Lamentation, Quietude, Iridescence, Introspection, Whirlwind
- Five Preludes on the name of Olga (Olga Samaroff-Stokowski), (1917)
  - Embryon, Eveil, Fète au village, Hallucinations, Fraicheur (G. Schirmer, 1933) (Fraicheur only)
- The Enchanted Isle a tone poem for Harp and Orchestra (1918), (Lyra)
- Bolmimerie for seven-harp ensemble (1918)
- Brise Marine for soprano, oboe, horn, bassoon, six harps (1918)
- Modern Study of the Harp (1919) (G. Schirmer, 1921) containing Five Poetical Studies for Harp Alone (1919)
  - "Flight", "Mirage", "Inquietude", "Idyllic Poem", "Communion"
- Poems of Sara Yarrow for soprano, oboe, horn, bassoon, six harps (1919)
  - Ecstasy, Despair, Humility
- Preludes Intimes (1919) (Boosey & Hawkes, 1954)
  - tenderly emoted, dreamingly, profoundly peaceful, in self-communion, procession-like
- Burlesque-Sentimental (1920)
- Five Sketches on Friends of Mine (1920)
  - Kyra Alanova, Dane Rudhyar, Edith Sullivan, Sara Yarrow, Edgard Varèse
- Four Preludes to the Afternoon of a Telephone for harp duo (1921)
  - Audubon 530, Plaza 4570, Prospect 7272, Riverside 4937
- Poem of the Little Stars (1921) (International Music, 1923, Lyra 1985)
- Recessional (1921), International Music, 1922, (Lyra, 1985)
- Sonata for Harp and Piano (1922) (Society for the Publication of American Music, G. Schirmer, 1922, Lyra)
- Four Pieces for the Modern Irish Harp (1924)
  - Sarabande variée, Bi-tonal jig, Pavloviana, Prelude Nocturne (apparently lost)
- Three Poems of Stephane Mallarme for soprano, harp, piano (1924)
  - Las de l'amer repos ou ma paresse offense, Feuillet d'album (soprano solo), Une dentelle s'abolit
- Nocturne to Ursula for oboe (1925)
- Concerto for Harp and Seven Wind Instruments (harp, fl/picc, cl A, ob, hn, bsn, trp C) (1926), Lyra
- Preludes for Beginners published in Method for the Harp (1927), G. Schirmer, 1929 (No titles for I-XI)
  - XII. Fanfare, XIII. Cortège, XIV. La Désirade, XV. Chanson dans la nuit
- Pentacle Suite for harp duo (1928), (Faith Carman (FC), 1985)
  - Steel, Serenade, Felines, Catacombs, Pantomime
- Preambule et Jeux (harp solo, fl, ob, bsn, str quintet) (one movement)
- Prelude Fatidique (1930) (G. Schirmer, 1950) (Lyra) (published with Suite of Eight Dances)
- Prelude in the Nature of an Octave Study (edited and titled by Dewey Owens) (1930) (Lyra 1985)
- Untitled work (harp, brasses, strings) (1930) sketch
- Musique des Troubadours soprano, harp, viola d'amore, viola da gamba (1931)
- Triptic Dance harp duo or trio, (1931), (Lyra) (published as a transcription from Pierre Beauchant, a pseudonym of Salzedo)
- Short Stories in Music harp (1934) Series I and II (Elkan-Vogel, 1934)
  - Series I: The Dwarf and the Giant, The Kitten and the Limping Dog, Rocking Horse, On Donkeyback, Raindrops, Madonna and Child, Memories of a Clock, Night Breeze (harp solo or ensemble)
  - Series II: On Stilts, Pirouetting Music Box, Behind the Barracks, At Church, Goldfish, The Mermaid's Chimes, Skipping Rope
- Scintillation (1936) (Elkan-Vogel, 1936)
- Diatonic Variations on The Carnival of Venice (Lyra, 1985)
- Tiny Tales for Harpist Beginners Series I and II, (1936) (Elkan-Vogel, 1942)
  - In Hoop-Skirts, The Little Princess and the Dancing Master, A Little Orphan in the Snow, Lullaby for a Doll, The Cloister at Twilight, A Mysterious Blue Light, Funeral Procession of a Tin Soldier, The Chimes in the Steeple, A Lost Kitten, Pagoda of the Dragon
  - Series II: Processional, The Clock Maker's Shop, Winter Night, The Dandy, Chimes, Little Soldiers, Mysterious Forest, Little Jacques, Grandmother's Memories, Frère Jacques
- Panorama Suite (1937)
- Noon, Moonset, Expectation, The Birth of the Morning Star, Waltz
- Vieni, Vieni (1938) (a suite of harp solos, unpublished)
- Sketches for Harpist Beginners two series (1942) (Elkan-Vogel)
  - Series I: Rock Me, Mommy, Imitation, Echo, Huntsman's Horn, Lost in the Mist, Hurdy-Gurdy, Poor Doggy, Tuneful Snuff-Box, Pagan Rite, Beethoven at School
  - Series II: The Organist's First Steps, A Young Violinist, Falling Leaves, Royal Trumpeters, A Lonely Bell, Baby on the Swing, Mourners, On the Tight Rope, Pierrot is Sad, Chorale
- Second Harp parts for Short Stories in Music (1942)
- Behind the Barracks, Memories of a Clock, On Donkey-Back, Rain Drops, Night Breeze, The Mermaid's Chimes, Skipping Rope (G. Schirmer)
- The Art of Modulating (1943) (G. Schirmer, 1950)
  Lullaby, Reverie, Carillon, Grandmother's Spinning Wheel, Petite Valse, Florentine Music Box
- Suite of Eight Dances (1943) (G. Schirmer, 1950)
  - Gavotte, Menuet, Polka, Siciliana, Bolero, Seguidilla, Tango, Rumba
- Mimi Suite (1946)
  - Mimi, Awakening, Incandescence, Obsession (harp or piano)
- Wedding Presents (1946–52)
  - Garlanded Chimes, Vers l'Inconnu, In the Valley, In the Month of Maie, Shadow of a Shade, Idee-fixe, Desir, Interlude for the Theatre, Vision, Carol-Paul
- Cadenza and editing for the Berezowsky Concerto for Harp (1947) (Elkan-Vogel, 1947)
- Prelude for a Drama (1948) (M. Baron, 1951)
- Diptych, Two Pieces for the Right Hand Alone (1950)
  - Reflection, Interference
- Conditioning Exercises (1951) (G. Schirmer, 1955)
- Mardi-Gras Patrol for harp ensemble
- Conflict (in Pathfinder for the Harp (Peer-Southern Music, 1951)
- Elyze (1952)
- Second Concerto for Harp and Orchestra (1953-1961) (Lyra, 1966) (also known as Symphonic Suite—dialog for harp and orchestra)
- Chanson dans la Nuit second harp part (G. Schirmer, 1955)
- Rumba and Tango (Suite of Eight Dances) second harp parts (G. Schirmer, 1955)

== Original paraphrases and arrangements for the harp in alphabetic order ==
- Annie Laurie (Carl Fischer)
- Believe Me, If All Those Endearing Young Charms (Carl Fischer)
- Blink to me only with one eye
- Concert Variations on:
  - Adeste Fideles, Deck the Halls, Good King Wenceslaus, O Tannenbaum, Silent Night (Boosey & Hawkes)
- Deep River (Carl Fischer)
- Dixie Parade (original composition) (Peer-Southern)
- I Wonder as I Wander (G. Schirmer)
- Jingle Bells
- Jolly Piper (original composition) (Peer-Southern)
- Londonderry Air (Carl Fischer)
- Paraphrases on Christmas Carols:
  - Angels We Have Heard on High, Away in a Manger, Away in a Manger (to the tune of Flow Gently, Sweet Afton), The First Noel, God Rest Ye Merry Gentlemen, Hark! The Herald Angels Sing, It Came Upon a Midnight Clear, O Little Town of Bethlehem, We Three Kings of Orient Are, What Child is This (Greensleeves) (Boosey & Hawkes)
- Short Fantasies on:
  - A Basque Carol, A Catalan Carol, A Neapolitan Carol, A Noel Provencale (Boosey & Hawkes)
- Song of the Volga Boatman (Carl Fischer)
- The Last Rose of Summer (Carl Fischer)
- Traipsin’ thru Arkansaw (original composition) (Peer-Southern)
- Turkey Strut (original composition) (Peer-Southern)
- Two New Wedding Marches: Meyerbeer, Gluck

== Transcriptions of works by other composers, alphabetical by original composer ==
(for harp alone unless otherwise indicated)

- Albeniz: La Fete-Dieu a Seville (orchestra part created for Leopold Stokowski)
- Bach, J.S.:
  - Bourree (G. Schirmer/Lyra)
  - Polonaise et Badinerie (flute and harp) (Lyra)
  - Sixth French Suite (harp duo or ensemble) (Lyra)
- Beethoven: Adagio from Moonlight Sonata (G. Schirmer)
- Boccherini: Sonata in A major (flute, cello, harp)
- Brahms:
  - Lullaby (Elkan-Vogel)
  - Waltz in A♭ (Carl Fischer)
- Cady: Oriental Dance (harp duo)
- Candeille: La Provencale (Tambourin) (harp quartet)
- Corelli: Giga (Solos for the Harp Player, G. Schirmer)
- Couperin:
  - Concerts Royaux (flute, harp, cello)
  - Sarabande
- Dandrieu:
  - Le Caquet (harp duo)
  - Play of the Winds (harp duo) (Lyra)
- Daquin: L'Hirondelle (harp duo)
- Debussy:
  - Ballade II from Trois Ballades de François Villon (voice and harp duo)
  - Children's Corner Suite (harp, flute, cello) (Lyra)
  - Clair de Lune (harp solo) (G. Schirmer)
  - Clair de Lune (harp duo) (Southern)
  - Danseuses de Delphes (harp duo)
  - En Bateau (Lyra)
  - First Arabesque (Solos for the Harp Player, G. Schirmer)
  - La Cathedrale Engloutie for harp ensemble (published as harp duo)
  - La Danse de Puck (7-harp ensemble)
  - La fille aux cheveux de lin (Lyra)
  - Les Cloches (soprano and harp duo)
  - Les Ingenues (soprano and harp duo)
  - Voiles (harp duo)
- De Falla: Seven Popular Spanish Songs (voice and harp duo) (American Harp Society edition)
- various works collected and titled by Salzedo as Suite Espagnole (flute, cello and harp duo)
- Dahlgren: The Maid and I (soprano and harp duo)
- Donizetti: Cadenza and solo from Lucia di Lammermoor (Elkan-Vogel)
- Durand: Chaconne (Solos for the Harp Player, G. Schirmer)
- Duparc: Invitation au Voyage (soprano and harp duo)
- Dvořák: Humoresque (harp solo—C. Fischer, or duo)
- Enescu: Sept Chansons de Clement Marot (soprano and harp duo)
- Faure: Dolly Suite (flute, harp, cello)
- Gluck:
  - Gavotte from Armide (Lyra)
  - Gavotte from Iphigenia in Aulis (Lyra)
  - March of the Priests from Alceste (Lyra)
- Granados: Spanish Dance No. 5 (harp duo) (Southern)
- Grieg: *A Vision (soprano and harp duo)
  - Springtide (soprano and harp duo)
- Guion: Alley Tunes—Three Scenes from the South (flute, harp, cello)
- Handel:
  - Concerto for Harp in B♭, edited extensively and original cadenza (Schirmer) in modern style, also edited in period style in ms.
  - Concerto for Oboe and harp
  - Largo (Carl Fischer)
  - Largo (fl/vln/vla, cello, harp)
  - Sonata in D (flute, cello, harp or harp duo)
  - The Harmonious Blacksmith (Elkan-Vogel)
- Haydn: Theme and Variations (edited) (Carl Fischer)
- Hue: Jeune Chansons sur des vieux airs (soprano and harp duo)
- Kjerulf: Ingrid's Song (soprano and harp duo)
- Lara: Concert Fantasy on Granada (Southern)
- Lie: Snow (soprano and harp duo)
- Locatelli: Trio Sonata (flute, harp, cello)
- Lotti: Sonata in G major (flute, harp, cello)
- Malotte: The Lord's Prayer (Schirmer)
- Marcello: Toccata in C minor (7-harp ensemble)
- Martini: Gavotte (harp duo) (Lyra)
- Massenet:
  - Meditation from Thais (violin and harp) (Baron)
  - Menuet d'Amour from Therese (Heugel)
- Mendelssohn:
  - On Wings of Song (harp duo) (Lyra)
  - Spinning Song (harp duo) (Lyra)
  - Spring Song (Schirmer)
  - Sweet Remembrance (Songs Without Words, No. 1) (Fischer)
  - Wedding March (Elkan-Vogel)
- Meyerbeer: Coronation March from Le Prophete (Elkan-Vogel)
- Mozart: Concerto for flute and harp, edited and revised orchestration, edited cadenzas by Reinecke (Southern)
- Nin: Granadina (cello and harp) (Lyra)
- Offenbach: Barcarolle from Tales of Hoffmann (Fischer)
- Pescetti: Sonata in C minor (Schirmer/Lyra/Colin)
- Prokofieff: Prelude in C major (Leeds/Lyra)
- Rameau:
  - Gavotte from Le Temple de la Gloire (Schirmer/Lyra)
  - La Joyeuse (harp duo) (Lyra)
  - Les Sauvages (harp duo)
  - Menuet Chantee (soprano and harp duo)
  - Rigaudon
  - Tambourin (published with Rigaudon in Solos for the Harp Player) (Schirmer)
  - Pièces de Clavecin en Concert, Suites I and II (flute, harp, cello)
- Ravel:
  - A la maniere de Faure, Chabrier, Borodin (flute, harp, cello)
  - Cinq Melodies Grecque (voice and harp) (Lyra)
  - Piece en forme de Habanera (solo instrument or voice and harp) (Lyra)
  - Prelude (Durand)
  - Sainte (voice and harp)
  - Sonatine (as Sonatine en Trio) (flute harp and cello) (Lyra)
- Rimsky-Korsakoff: Revised Cadenza for Capriccio Espagnole (ABC of Harp Playing, Schirmer)
- Rubenstein: Melody in F (Fischer)
- Saint-Amans: Ninette a la cour (harp duo)
- Saint-Saëns: The Swan (violin or cello and harp (Schirmer)
- Scarlatti: The Cat's Fugue (harp duo)
- Sierching: Sylvelin (soprano and harp duo)
- Telemann: Sonata in F (flute/recorder, harp, cello) (Lyra)
- Tchaikovsky: Cadenza for the Nutcracker (Lyra)
- Thomas: Cadenza for Mignon (Lyra)
- Valensin: Menuet from Symphony No. 1 (flute, harp, cello)
- Wagner: Magic Fire Music from Die Walkure for one or two harps (Leduc)
  - Wedding March from Lohengrin (Lyra)
