= List of compositions by Alexander Dreyschock =

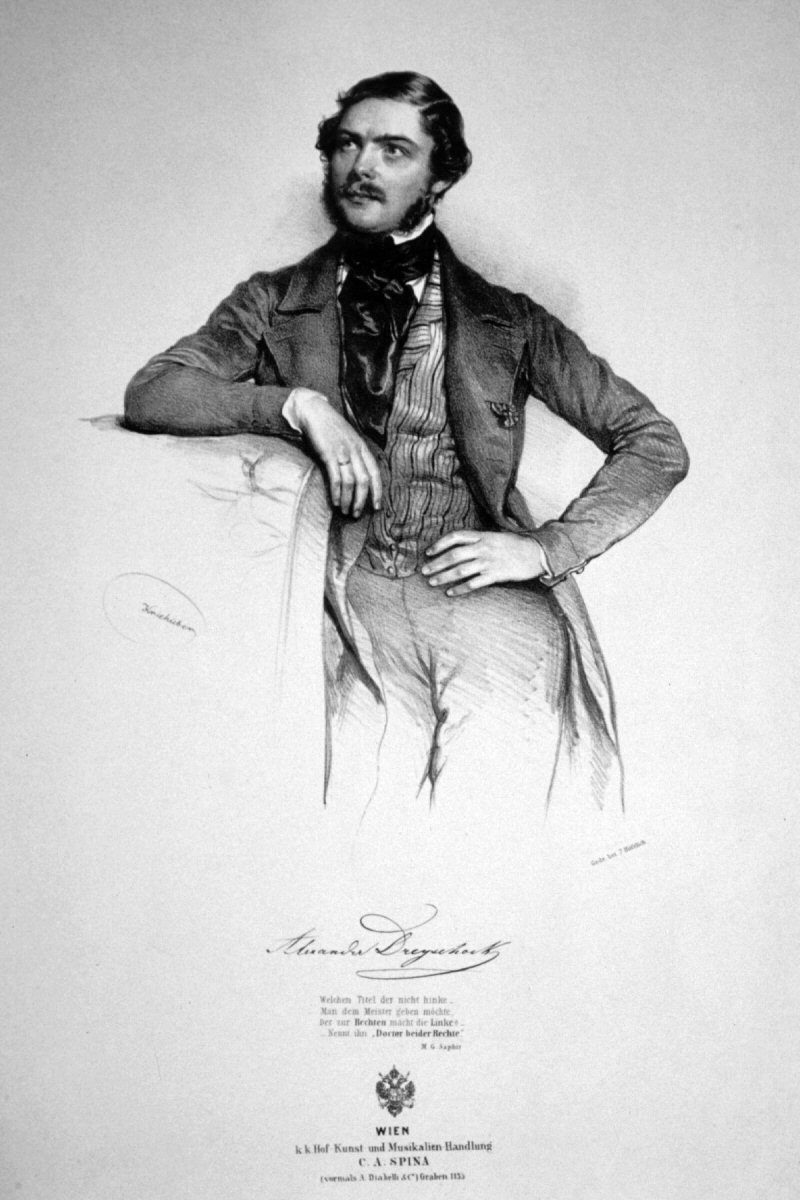
Alexander Dreyschock was famous for playing the left-hand arpeggios of Chopin's Revolutionary Étude in octaves, at every concert.

This is a list of compositions by Alexander Dreyschock.

== Piano ==
=== Piano Solo ===
- 8 Exercises de Bravoure en Forme de Valse, Op. 1
- 3 Andante & 4 Impromptus caractéristiques, Op. 3
- Souvenir, Op. 4
- 3 Thèmes variés, Op. 6
- Andante cantabile, Op. 7
- Souvenir d'Amitié Op. 8
- Scène romantique, Op. 9
- La Campanella, Op. 10
- Variations sur un Thème original, Op. 11
- Rondo militaire No. 1, Op. 13
- Mazurka, Op. 14
- Les Adieux de Varsovie, Op. 15
- Nocturne, Op. 16/1
- Bluette, Op. 16/2
- l'Absence, Op. 17
- Les Regrets, Op. 18
- Scherzo, Op. 19
- Rondo militaire No. 2, Op. 20
- Impromptu, Op. 21
- Variations for the left hand alone, Op. 22
- Andante inquietoso, Op. 23
- Le Ruisseau, Op. 24
- La Coupe - Chanson à Boire, Op. 25
- Le Vallon – Idylle, Op. 26
- Nocturne, Op. 28
- L'Inquietude Op.29 - Morceau de Concert
- Piano Sonata in D minor, Op. 30
- Fantaisie, Op. 31
- Rondo Brillant, Op. 32
- Impromptu, Op. 33
- Souvenir de Pest, Op. 34
- Preludio e Fuga, Op. 35
- Nocturne, Op. 36
- Rhapsodie, Op. 37
- Rhapsodie, Op. 38
- Rhapsodie, Op. 39
- Rhapsodie zum Wintermärchen, Op. 40
- Souvenir de Berlin, Op. 41
- Pastorella, Op. 42
- Scherzo, Op. 43
- Capriccio, Op. 44
- Morceau caractéristique, Op. 45
- Rhapsodie, Op. 46
- Andantino, Op. 47
- Napolitana – Canzonetta, Op. 48
- Romance en Forme d'Etude, Op. 49
- Andantino con Variazione, Op. 51
- La Gaîté - Morceau caractéristique, Op. 52
- Bluette, Op. 53
- Nocturne, Op. 54
- Fantaisie, Op. 55
- Fantaisie, Op. 56
- Allegro spirituoso, Op. 57
- Impromptu, Op. 58
- La Gentillesse – Rondoletto, Op. 59
- Le jeune Guerrier, Op. 60
- Scène champêtre No. 1, Op. 61
- Le Voyageur – Nocturne, Op. 62
- Romance sans Paroles, Op. 63
- Mazurka, Op. 64
- Scène champêtre No. 2, Op. 65
- La Résolution, Op. 67
- Le Naufrage, Op. 68
- Le Festin de Noces Vénitiens, Op. 69
- La Sirène, Op. 70
- Nocturne, Op. 71
- Ballata, Op. 72
- Invitation à la polka, Op. 73
- La Fête innocente, Op. 74
- La Source (Souvenir de Teplitz), Op. 75
- Morceau Pathétique, Op. 76
- La Rêverie, Op. 81
- Souvenir d'Irlande - 3 Pièces, Op. 82
- 2 Impromptus, Op. 83
- Le Chant du Combat, Op. 84
- La Mélancolie, Op. 85
- Grand Caprice de Concert No. 1, Op. 86
- Élégie, Op. 87
- Grande Caprice de Concert No. 2, Op. 88
- 3 Scènes de Chasse, Op. 89
- Fleurs de Bois, Op. 90
- Impromptu en forme d’une Mazurka, Op. 91
- Soirée D’hiver, Op. 92
- Invitation à la Mazurka, Op. 94
- Hommage à Vienne – Nocturne, Op. 95
- La Fontaine, Op. 96
- Le Contraste, Op. 97
- Rhapsodie, Op. 98/
- Piano Pieces, Op. 98/2
- Impromptu, Op. 100
- Nocturne, Op. 102
- Morceau caractéristique, Op. 103
- Ballade, Op. 104
- Souvenir de Copenhague, Op. 106
- Scherzo, Op. 107
- Styrienne original, Op. 108
- 3 Mazurkas, Op. 109
- Élégie, Op. 110
- Le Rêve – Spinnerlied, Op. 111
- Rastlose Liebe, Op. 112
- Aus der Ferne, Op. 114
- 2 Romances, Op. 115
- Impromptu, Op. 116
- Grande Fantaisie, Op. 117
- Pensée fugitive, Op. 118
- Allegro appassionato, Op. 119
- Une Suite de 3 Nocturnes, Op. 120
- Schlummerlied, Op. 121
- Fantaisie Mazurka, Op. 124
- La Mélancolie et Inspiration, Op. 125
- Paraphrase sur des Motifs de l'Opéra Halka, Op. 126
- Souvenir de Norderney, Op. 127
- Spinnerlied, Op. 128
- Grande Variation on God Save the Queen for the left hand alone, Op. 129
- Das Elfenleben, Op. 130
- 3 Piano Pieces, Op. 131
- Sur l'Eau et dans la Foret - 2 Piano Pieces, Op. 132
- Romance from Schubert's Die Verschworenen, Op. 133
- Bluette Ein Abend an der Alster, Op. 135
- La Babillarde, Op. 136
- Élégie, Op. 138
- Nocturne, Op. 139
- Chanson sans Paroles, Op. 140
- 3 Piano Pieces, Op. 141
- Six Piano Pieces, Op. 142
- L'Adieu – Impromptu, Op. 143
- Le Trémolo

=== Piano, Four hands ===
- Polonaise for piano four hands, Op. 5

== Chamber music ==
=== Violin and Piano ===
- 2 Morceaux for Violin and Piano in collaboration with H. Panofka, Op. 79

=== String Quartet ===
- String Quartet, Op. 105

== Orchestral ==
=== Piano and Orchestra ===
- Große Fantasie for Piano and Orchestra, Op. 12
- Konzertstück in C minor for Piano and Orchestra, Op. 27
- L’inquietude for Piano and Orchestra, Op. 29
- Piano Concerto in D minor, Op. 137

=== Other ===
- Overture for Orchestra, Op. 50

== Choral Music ==
- Psalmen des Friedens, Op. 123 (?)

== Lieder ==
- Elle manque à ma Felicité, Op. 122 (?)
- Drei Lieder
