= List of compositions by John Woolrich =

This is a list of compositions by John Woolrich (born 1954). His music is published by Faber Music.

== Brass and wind ==
- Call to the Mirrors (2014)
- Fanfare (1994)
- Sennets and Tuckets (1998)

== Chamber ensemble ==
- A Book of Studies sets I and II (1993)
- A Cabinet of Curiosities (1993)
- A door just opened on a street (from A Book of Inventions)
- A Dramolet, for clarinet, cello and piano (2008)
- A Farewell, for clarinet, viola and piano (1992)
- A Leap in the Dark (1994)
- A Parcel of Airs (from A Book of Inventions)
- A Presence of Departed Acts, for clarinet, violin, cello and piano (2002)
- A Shadowed Lesson (1993)
- A Short Story (from A Book of Inventions)
- A Still Tragic Dance (from A Book of Inventions)
- Adagissimo, for piano quartet (1997)
- After the Clock (1989)
- Another Journey Calls (from A Book of Inventions)
- Badinerie (from A Book of Inventions)
- Caprichos (1997)
- Contredanse (1991)
- Cutting a Caper (2001)
- Dartington Doubles (1988)
- Debricollage (from A Book of Inventions)
- Disparition (from A Book of Inventions)
- Duendecitos (from A Book of Inventions)
- Ending Up (from A Book of Inventions)
- Envoi, for viola and small ensemble (1997)
- Exploit in White, for brass quintet (2001)
- Fantazia, for viol consort (1994)
- Favola in Musica I, for oboe, clarinet and piano (1990)
- Favola in Musica II, for oboe, soprano saxophone and percussion (1992)
- From the Book of Disquiet (2005)
- From the Shadow (1994)
- Going a Journey (2006)
- In the Mirrors of Asleep (2007)
- In the Stones, for string quartet (2004)
- Kleine Wanderung (from A Book of Inventions)
- Leaving Home, for oboe quintet (2003)
- Lending Wings (1989)
- Morendo (from A Book of Inventions)
- Music from a House of Crossed Desires (1996)
- My Box of Phantoms, for oboe quartet (1998)
- Oboe Quintet (1998)
- Pluck from the Air, for piano quintet (2013)
- Quick Steps (1990)
- Quiddities (2005)
- Scamander (from A Book of Inventions)
- Scherzi di Fantasia (from A Book of Inventions)
- Sestina, for piano quartet (1997)
- Songs and Broken Music (1993)
- Spalanzani's Daughter (1983)
- Stealing a March (2000)
- Stone Dances (1980)
- String Quartet No. 1 (1995)
- String Quartet No. 2 (2000)
- String Trio (1996)
- Suite from Bitter Fruit (2002)
- Swan Song (2015)
- The Death of King Renaud, for string quintet (1991)
- The Devil in the Clock (2012)
- The Iron Cockerel Sings (1998)
- The Lost Day of Return (2004)
- The Night will not draw on, for piano trio (2008)
- The path is winding (from A Book of Inventions)
- The Turkish Mouse, for oboe and piano (1988)
- The Voices of Dust (from A Book of Inventions)
- The Way Out Discovered (1997)
- Three Arias for Oboe and Six Viols (2001)
- Three Fantasias for Six Viols (2001)
- Totentanz (from A Book of Inventions)
- Toward the Black Sky, for piano trio (1997)
- Unweaving (from A Book of Inventions)
- Villanesca (from A Book of Inventions)
- Watermark, for violin and bass clarinet (2002)
- Zibaldone (from A Book of Inventions)

== Chamber orchestra ==
- A Curtain Tune (1996)
- Arcangelo (2002)
- Between the Hammer and the Anvil (2008)
- Cantilena (1997)
- Come and Go (2005)
- Concerto for Orchestra (1999)
- Speed the Going (1998)
- Through paths and turnings (2013)

== Choral ==
- A Book of Elegies (1996)
- A Quality of Loss (2014)
- A world is growing green (2016)
- Earth Grown Old (2003)
- Far from Home (1993)
- Little Walserings (1999)
- Over the Sea (1993)
- Paradise (2000)
- Spring in Winter (2001)
- That saying goodbye at the edge of the dark (2016)
- The Old Year (1999)
- The Rolling Years (2000)
- This Change (2003)
- Three Choruses (1998)

== Instrumental ==
- A Sort of Heaven, for violin and piano (2013)
- Darker Still, for flute and piano (2002)
- Dum Spiro, Spero, for accordion (2001)
- Elegy, for cello and piano (2001)
- Four Pieces for cello and piano (1994)
- Im Ruhigen Tal, for violin and piano (1993)
- Keepsake, for solo cor anglais (2000)
- Locus Solus, for piano (1998)
- Ostinato, for piano (2019)
- Pianobooks I-XV (1991–2016)
- ....that is Night, for violin and piano (1995)
- The Kingdom of Dreams, for oboe and piano (1989)
- The wakeful Night, for clarinet in A (2019)
- Three Capriccios for Oboe (2001)
- Three Pieces for Viola (1993)
- Three Pieces for Violin (2001)
- Through a Limbeck, for solo viola (2002)
- ....with land in Sight, for solo cello (1994)

== Music theatre ==
- Bitter Fruit (1999–2000)

== Orchestral ==
- A Capriccio to Calliope Herself (2000)
- A Litany, for oboe and strings (1998–99)
- Accord (1999)
- Concerto for Cello (1998)
- Concerto for Oboe (1996)
- Concerto for Viola (1993)
- Concerto for Violin (2008)
- Falling Down, for double bassoon and orchestra (2009)
- Fanfarronada (2002)
- Si Va Facendo Notte, for clarinet and strings (1992)
- Tales of Transformation (2004)
- The Barber's Timepiece (1986)
- The Elephant from Celebes (2005)
- The Ghost in the Machine (1990)
- The Street of Crocodiles, for piano, trumpet and strings (2005)
- The Theatre Represents a Garden: Night (1991)
- The Tongs and the Bones (2014)
- Whitel's Ey (2008)

== String orchestra ==
- Another Staircase Overture (1994)
- Blue Drowning (2005)
- Capriccio (2009)
- Italian Songs (2009)
- It is Midnight, Dr Schweitzer (1992)
- To the Silver Bow, for viola, bass and strings (2014)
- Ulysses Awakes (1989)
- Variation on 'Sellinger's Round' (2013)

== Vocal ==
- A Paper of Black Lines (2008)
- A Singing Sky (2009)
- Ariadne Laments (1994)
- Berceuse (1990)
- Black Riddle (1984)
- Cascades (1983)
- Five Italian Songs (1984)
- Four Concert Arias (1994)
- Four Songs after Hoffmann (1981)
- Good Morning – Midnight (2002)
- Harlequinade (1983)
- Here is My Country (1995)
- La Cantarina (1989)
- Light and Rock (1988)
- Malicious Observer (1995–96)
- Once there was not (2025)
- Ophelia Songs (1988)
- Serbian Songs (1988)
- The Sea and its Shore (2004)
- The Unlit Suburbs (1998)
- The Voices (2014)
- Three Cautionary Tales (1990–94)
- Three Macedonian Songs (1984)
- Three Purcell Songs, arranged for high voice and strings
- Three Songs for alto and six viols (2001)
- Three Songs for mezzo and strings (2003)
- To Witness her Goodbye (1995)
- Twisting that Lock (1997)

== Bibliography ==
- David Wright 'Compact Risks: John Woolrich's Economic Policy of Composition', The Listener (3 August 1989)
- David Wright 'John Woolrich: Expanding Continuities', Musical Times, cxxxi (1990)
