= List of compositions by Albert Dietrich =

This is a list of compositions by Albert Dietrich.

== Piano ==
=== Piano solo ===
- Vier Klavierstücke, Op. 2
- Sechs Klavierstücke, Op. 6

=== Piano, four hands ===
- Sonata in G major for piano, four hands, Op. 19

== Chamber music ==
=== Violin and Piano ===
- Allegro for Violin and Piano (1st movement of F-A-E Sonata)

=== Cello and Piano ===
- Cello Sonata in C, Op. 15
- Intermezzo for Cello and Piano, Op. 116/4

=== Piano Trio ===
- Piano Trio No. 1 in C minor, Op. 9
- Piano Trio No. 2 in A, Op. 14

== Orchestral ==
=== Symphonies ===
- Symphony in D minor, Op. 20

=== Violin and orchestra ===
- Violin Concerto in D minor, Op. 30

=== Cello and orchestra ===
- Cello Concerto in G minor, Op. 32

=== Horn and orchestra ===
- Introduction and Romance for Horn and Orchestra, Op. 27

=== Other ===
- Normannenfahrt, Op. 26
- Overture in C major for Orchestra, Op. 35

== Incidental music ==
- Cymbeline, Op. 38

== Opera ==
- Robin Hood, Op. 34 (A new production at the Theater Erfurt had its premiere on March 20, 2011.)
- Das Sonntagskind
- Die Braut vom Liebenstein
- Charles d'Anjou

== Choral music ==
- Morgenhymne 'Phöbos Apollon, seliger Gott' aus 'Elektra' von Hermann Allmers, Op. 24
- Altchristlicher Bittgesang, Op. 25
- Rheinmorgen, Op. 31
- Weihnachtslied, Op. 37

== Lieder ==
- Widmung, Op. 1/1
- Nachtlied, Op. 1/2
- All'weil giebt es kein grössere Lust, Op. 1/3
- Die alte Linde, Op. 1/4
- Liederfrühling, Op. 1/5
- Frühlings-Aufruf, Op. 1/6
- Tröstung, Op. 1/7
- Die Trauerweide, Op. 1/8
- "Kein Leid ist grösser als Herzeleid", Op. 1/9
- Ade, Op. 1/10
- Ritter Frühling, Op. 3/1
- Früh Morgens, Op. 3/2
- Im April, Op. 3/3
- Hinab von den Bergen, Op. 3/4
- Erwachen, Op. 3/5
- Des Müden Abendlied, Op. 3/6
- Frühlingsandacht, Op. 4/1
- Du weisst es nicht, Op. 4/2
- Ständchen, Op. 4/3
- Der Liebe Lust und Leid, Op. 4/4
- Liebeslenz, Op. 4/5
- Du fragst warum, Op. 4/6
- Ueberall Liebchen, Op. 4/7
- Vom Pagen und der Königstochter, Op. 5
- Unter dem Schatten, Op. 7/1
- Mein Liebchen naht, Op. 7/2
- Murmelndes Lüftchen, Op. 7/3
- Abschied, Op. 7/4
- Wenn du zu den Blumen gehst, Op. 7/5
- Es regnet, Op. 8/1
- Wie hat die Nacht so weh gethan, Op. 8/2
- Zauberkreis, Op. 8/3
- Wenn sich zwei Herzen recht verstehen, Op. 8/4
- Schneeglöckchen, Op. 8/5
- An den Abendstern, Op. 8/6
- Mit dem blauen Federhute, Op. 10/1
- Ob sie meiner noch gedenket, Op. 10/2
- Ein Heil kamst du gezogen, Op. 10/3
- Hoch um die Bergeskuppen, Op. 10/4
- Still weht die Nacht, Op. 10/5
- Der Storch ist längst hinunter, Op. 10/6
- Einzug, Op. 11/1
- Frühling, Op. 11/2
- An die Nacht, Op. 11/3
- Das Mädchen spricht, Op. 11/4
- Sommer, Op. 11/5
- Zauberbann, Op. 11/6
- März, Op. 12/1
- Frühling über's Jahr, Op. 12/2
- War schöner als der schönste Tag, Op. 12/3
- Dämmerung senkte sich von oben, Op. 12/4
- Im Sommer, Op. 12/5
- Fern, ach fern, Op. 13/1
- Will ruhen unter den Bäumen hier, Op. 13/2
- Glocken zur See, Op. 13/3
- Gute Nacht, Op. 13/4
- Treulieb' ist nimmer weit, Op. 13/5
- Ach, wie weh tuth Scheiden, Op. 13/6
- Dein Auge, Op. 16/1
- Ja oder Nein, Op. 16/2
- Meine Linde, Op. 16/3
- Frühlingabend, Op. 16/4
- Um Mitternacht, Op. 16/5
- Wenn ich ihn nur habe, Op. 16/6
- An meiner Thüre du blühender Zweig, Op. 33/1
- Immer schaust du in die Ferne, Op. 33/2
- Unter blühenden Bäumen, Op. 33/3
- Es führen die Elfen den den Reigen, Op. 33/4
- Ueber Liebchens Dache, Op. 33/5
- Seefahrers Heimweh, Op. 33/6
- Es sollte der letzte Tag ja sein, Op. 36/1
- Waldruhe, Op. 36/2
- O, sei mir hold, du segnender Augenstrahl, Op. 36/3
- Nun ist ein jeder Nerv in mir, Op. 36/4
- Maria, Mutter der Gnaden, Op. 39/1
- Schlaftrunken wallen die Bäche, Op. 39/2
- Die Amsel ist's, die so heimlich singt, Op. 39/3
- Nun ist die Nacht vergangen, Op. 39/4
- In dein abgrundtiefes Auge blickt ich, Op. 39/5
- Mein bist du, mein, Op. 39/6
