= List of compositions by Giovanni Sgambati =

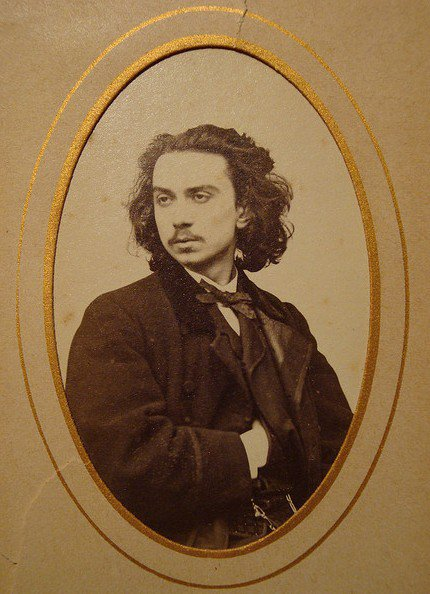
Giovanni Sgambati as a young man

This is a list of compositions by Giovanni Sgambati, an Italian composer. He conducted Liszt's Dante Symphony in 1866, and made the acquaintance of Richard Wagner's music for the first time at Munich, where he travelled with Liszt's company. His first album of songs appeared in 1870 (Schott Music), and his first symphony was played at the Palazzo del Quirinale in 1881.

== Opus Numbers ==
Some of the entries below list two opus numbers. In his contribution about Sgambati for the New Grove, John Waterhouse attaches a worklist supposedly by the composer himself, with a completely different numbering system than that used by Schott, Sgambati's main publisher, eliminating unused or disowned opus numbers. Library of Congress has started to put them in the uniform titles, and new editions after 2001 (e.g. his symphonies) use the new numbering. The composers own Opus numbers are used on the left, with Schott's published numbers added in parentheses after the title.

== List of compositions ==
=== Published works ===
==== Works with opus number ====
- Op. 1: Album vocale No. 1, 5 songs (1864); Schott: Op. 1
- Op. 2: Album vocale No. 2, 10 songs (1864); Schott: Op. 2
- Op. 3: Nocturne per l'album di Bellini, Nocturne for Piano (1873); Schott: Op. 3
- Op. 4: Piano Quintet No. 1 in F minor (1866); Schott: Op. 4
- Op. 5: Piano Quintet No. 2 in B♭ major (1876?); Schott: Op. 5
- Op. 6: Prelude and Fugue in E♭ minor for Piano (1876); Schott: Op. 6
- Op. 7: Études de Concert, for Piano (1880), Schott: Op. 10
- Op. 8: Fogli Volanti, 8 Pieces for Piano (1879–1880), sometimes Op. 12
- Op. 9: Gavotte for Piano (1880), Schott: Op. 14
- Op. 10: Piano Concerto in G minor (1878–1880), Schott: Op. 15
- Op. 11: Symphony No. 1 in D major (1880–1881), Schott: Op. 16
- Op. 12: String Quartet in C♯ minor (1882), Schott: Op. 17
- Op. 13: 4 Pieces for Piano (1872–1882), Schott: Op. 18
- Op. 14: Four Songs for Voice and Piano (1884)
- Op. 15: 3 Nocturnes for Piano (1873–1877)
- Op. 16: Suite in B minor for Piano (1888)
- Op. 17: Passiflora, for Voice and Piano, Schott: Op. 22
- Op. 18: 6 Lyric Pieces for Piano (1890), Schott: Op. 23
- Two Pieces for Violin and Piano, Schott: Op. 24
- Offertorio e Motetto (1901), Schott: Op. 27
- Op. 20: Te Deum Laudamus, Andante solenne for String Orchestra and Organ (after 1890), Schott: Op. 28
- Op. 21: Te Deum Laudamus, Andante solenne arranged for Large Orchestra and Organ (1894), Schott: Op. 28
- Op. 22: La Gondoliera for Violin and Piano, Schott: Op. 29
- Op. 23: Benedizione Nuziale, for Organ (1894), Schott: Op. 30
- Op. 24: Nocturne in D♭ major, for Piano (1897), Schott: Op. 31
- Op. 25: 4 Melodic Lyrics for Voice and Piano, Schott: Op. 32
- Op. 26: Nocturne in E major, for Piano (1897), Schott: Op. 33
- Op. 27: Versa est in luctum cythara mea, Motet for Baritone and Organ (1900?), Schott: Op. 34
- Op. 28: 4 Melodies for Voice and Piano (1897–1898), Schott: Op. 35
- Op. 29: 12 Poetic Melodies for Piano (1903), Schott: Op. 36
- Op. 30: Tout bas, Melody for Voice and Piano (1905), Schott: Op. 37
- Op. 38: Requiem for Baritone, Chorus, and Orchestra (1895–1896), Schott: Op. 38
- Rose, Song for Voice and Piano (1910), Schott: Op. 41
- Three Morceaux for Piano (1909), Schott: Op. 42

==== Works without opus number ====
- Boite à Musique, for piano (published 1916)
- 2 Songs for Voice and Piano
- Care luci, Nocturne for Voice and Piano
- Cola di Rienzo, Overture for Orchestra (1866)
- Fantasie alpestri, for Piano (1872–1882)
- Il faut aimer!, Song for Voice and Piano
- Marcia-Inno, for Orchestra
- Notturno alla memoria di Vincenzo Bellini
- Romance in A Major, for Piano (1878)
- Sinfonia festiva (Ouverture d'fete), for Orchestra (1878)
- Sérénade Valsée (published 1916)
- String Quartet in D minor (1864)
- Studio trionfale, for Piano (published 1916)
- Symphony No. 2 in E♭ minor/major (1883–1885)
- Venite cuncti venite, Motet for Soprano, Female Chorus and Orchestra

=== Unpublished works ===
- Allegretto con moto in B minor for piano (1886?)
- Audia filia, for chorus and orchestra (1870)
- Ballata in B minor for piano
- Cor di fiamma, for Voice and Piano
- Epitalamio sinfonico, for Orchestra (1887)
- Impromptu on a theme by Berlioz, for Voice and Piano
- L'Emir de Bengador, Romance for Voice and Piano
- Ninna nanna, for Voice and Piano (1895)
- Valse brillante in E major for Piano
- Canzona Lituana in F major for Piano
- Mélodie de Gluck in D minor for Piano
- Minuetto von Beethoven in G♭ major for Piano
- Preludio in C major for Piano (1863)
- Serenatina for Piano
- Scherzo in E major for Piano
- Presentimento in A♭ major for Piano
- Mestizia in F♯ minor for Piano
- Romanza in F major for Piano
- Cinque Improvvisi for Piano

=== Lost or missing ===
- String Nonet (1866)
- Cola di Rienzo, Overture for Piano and Orchestra (1866)
- Toccata, for Piano

=== Theoretical works ===
- Sgambati-for Boghen, Appunti ed esempi per l'uso dei pedali del pianoforte, Milan 1915, Ric.;
- Sgambati alone:
  - Revision des Gradus ad Parnassum v. Clementi (40 Übungen), ibid. 1916;
  - Formulario del pianista, Mainz, Schott, Milan 1922, Ric.;
  - Art. Il momento mus. moderno e l'opera della critica in Zs. Harmonia, 1913.
