= List of compositions by Ignaz Moscheles =

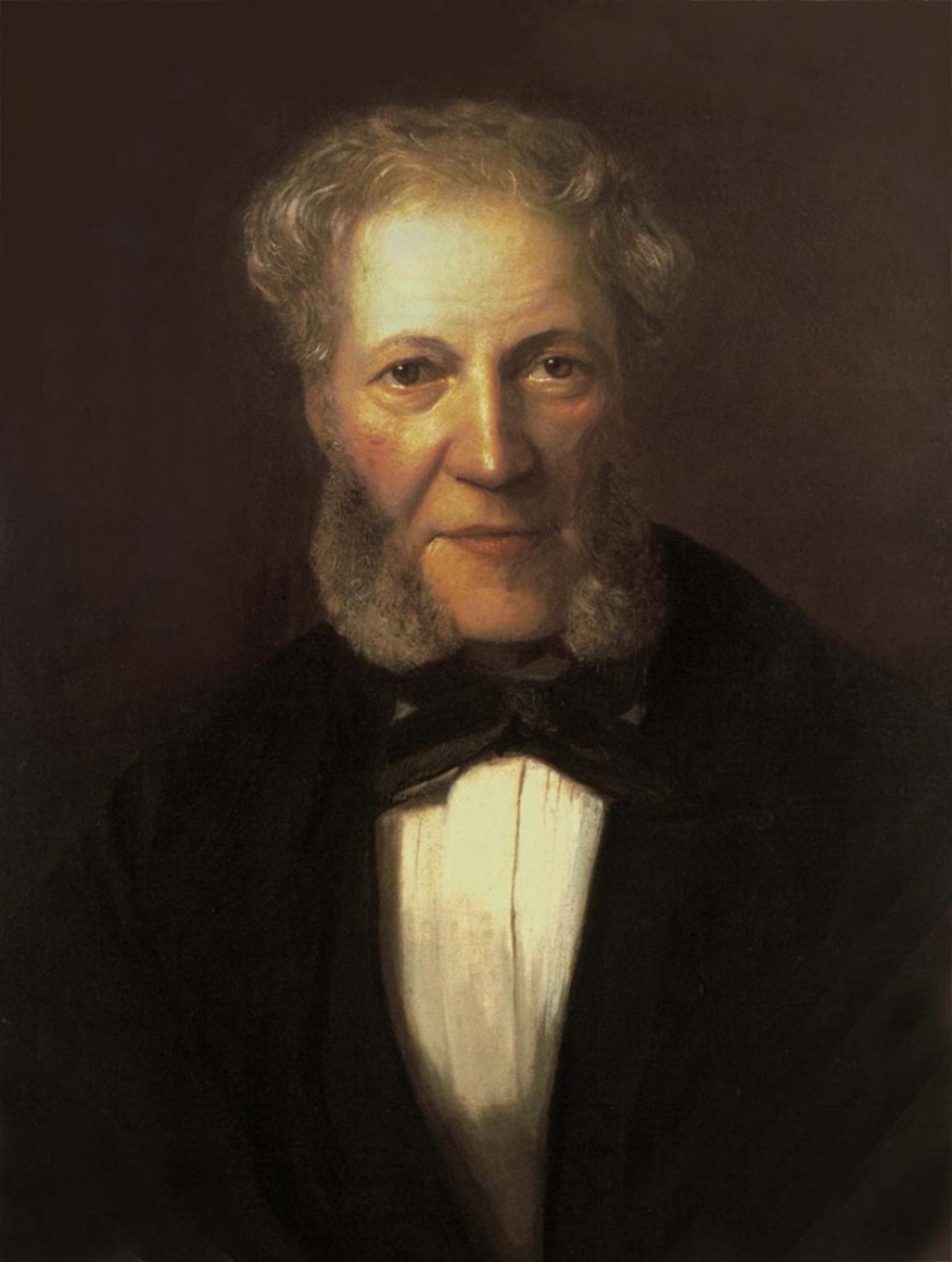
Ignaz Moscheles, from a portrait by his son Felix Moscheles, c. 1860.

This is a list of compositions by Ignaz Moscheles.

== Works with Opus Number ==
- Op.1 – Variations sur un Thême de l'Opéra: Une Folie for Piano
- Op.2 – 10 Variations sur l'Air favori de l'Opéra: Der Dorfbarbier for Piano (1808)
- Op.3 – Polonaise in D Major for Piano
- Op.4 – Nouvelle Sonatine Façile et Agréable for Piano
- Op.5 – Air favori de Weigl: Wer hörte wohl jemals mich klagen varié for Piano
- Op.6 – Variations for Piano sur l'Air national autrichien: Müsts ma nix in Uebel aufnehma
- Op.7 – Variazioni for Piano sopra la Cavatina: Tu sei il mio dolce amore dell'Opera: Trajano in Dacia
- Op.8 – 10 Valses for Piano
- Op.9 – 5 Deutsche Tänze for Piano (1810)
- Op.10 – Triumphmarsch nebst zwei Trios for Piano Four-Hands
- Op.11 – 2 Rondos for Piano sur des Motifs introduits dans le Ballet: Les Portraits de l'Auteur
- Op.12 – Introduction & Rondo for Piano sur une Barcarole Vénitienne
- Op.13 – Fantaisie Héroïque for Piano
- Op.14 – Rondo Brillante for Piano
- Op.15 – Variations for Piano sur un Thème favori, Tiré du Sextuor de l'Opéra: Der Augenarzt
- Op.16 – 3 Erotische Lieder von E. Ludwig
- Op.17 – Introduction et Variations concertantes for Piano, Violin, & Cello
- Op.18 – 3 Rondeaux for Piano
- Op.19 – Polonaise Précédée d'une Introduction for Piano
- Op.20 – Grand Duo Concertant pour Pianoforte et Guitare par Moscheles et Giuliani
- Op.21 – 6 Variations Concertantes for Piano & Flute or Violin
- Op.22 – Piano Sonata in D Major
- Op.23 – Variations for Piano sur un Thème Russe
- Op.24 – Rondo Espagnol for Piano
- Op.25 – Caprice in A minor for Piano
- Op.26 – Triumpheinzug der Verbündeten Mächte in Paris, ein charakteristisches Tongemälde for the Piano (1814)
- Op.27 – Piano Sonata in B♭ Major (1814)
- Op.28 – 6 Divertissements for Piano (1814)
- Op.29 – Variations for Piano on a Theme of Handel (1814)
- Op.30 – Rondo Brillant for Piano Four–Hands (1814)
- Op.31 – 3 Marches Héroïques for Piano Four–Hands (1815)
- Op.32 – Grandes Variations sur un Theme militaire: La Marche d'Alexandre variée for Piano with Orchestra Accompaniment (1815)
- Op.33 – 6 Valses avec Trios for Piano Four-Hands (1814)
- Op.34 – Grand Duo Concertant for Piano & Cello or Bassoon (1814)
- Op.35 – Grand Sextuor pour Pianoforte, Violon, Flûte, 2 Cors et Violoncelle (1815)
- Op.36 – Variations de Concert for Piano & Violin on an Austrian Waltz
- Op.37 – Grand Caprice Suivi d'un Potpourri for Piano & Cello or Violin
- Op.38 – Fantasie (in Italian Style) verbunden mit einem grossen Rondo for Piano
- Op.39 – Einleitung und Variationen for Piano on an Austrian National Song
- Op.40 – Les Portraits, Ballet Champêtre et Comique, arrangé pour le Pianoforte par l'Auteur
- Op.40b – Divertissements for Piano. Les Motifs tirés du Ballet: Les Portraits par l'Auteur
- Op.41 – Grande Sonata for Piano (1816)
- Op.42 – Grandes Variations sur une Mélodie Nationale Autrichienne pour le Pianoforte avec 2 Violons, Alto, Violoncelle et Contrebasse, ou sans Accompagnement
- Op.43 – Grand Rondeau Brillant pour le Pianoforte avec Accompagnement de 2 Violons, Alto, Violoncelle et Contrebasse
- Op.44 – Grande Sonate Concertante for Piano & Flute
- Op.45 – Piano Concerto No.1 in F major (1818)
- Op.46 – Fantasie, Variationen und Finale über das Böhmische Volkslied, To gsau kône Concertirend für Pianoforte, Violine, Clarinet (oder Viola) und Violoncell (1819)
- Op.47 – Grande Sonata for Piano Four-Hands
- Op.48 – Französisches Rondo Concertirend for Piano & Violin (1819)
- Op.49 – Sonata Melancolique for Piano
- Op.50 – Fantaisie et Variations sur l'air Favori: Au clair de la Lune for Piano & Orchestral Accompaniment (1821)
- Op.51 – 3 Allegri di Bravura for Piano (1821)
- Op.52 – Rondoletto for Piano, La Tenerezza
- Op.53 – Polonaise Brillant for Piano
- Op.54 – Les Charmes de Paris for Piano (1822)
- Op.55 – Bonbonnière musicale. Suite de Morceaux Faciles, Agréables et Doigtés for Piano
- Op.56 – Piano Concerto No.2 in E♭ major (1821)
- Op.57 – Fantaisie pour le Pianoforte sur 3 Airs Favoris Ecossais
- Op.58 – Jadis et aujourd'hui, une Gigue et un Quadrille: Rondeau for Piano
- Op.59 – Grand Potpourri Concertant pour Piano & Violin or Flûte, by Moscheles et Lafont (1821)
- Op.60 – Piano Concerto No.3 in g minor (1820) (The catalogue of Moscheles complete works gives this work as Op.60, however, the score has Op.58, therefore the concerto might have been published under different opus numbers.)
- Op.61 – Rondoletto sur un Nocturne Favori de Paër for Piano
- Op.62 – Impromptu in B minor for Piano (1824)
- Op.63 – Introduction et Rondeau Ecossais Concertants pour Piano et Cor (or Violin or Cello) (1821)
- Op.64 – Piano Concerto No.4 in E major (Morgan Library has manuscript (or photocopy?), which has note, in German, begun 18 March 1823 in Bath (England))
- Op.65 – Impromptu Martial sur l'Air Anglais: Revenge he cries for Piano (1825)
- Op.66 – La petite Babillarde. Rondeau for Piano (1825)
- Op.67 – 3 Rondeaux Brillants for Piano sur des Motifs favoris du Vaudeville Allemand: Les Viennois à Berlin
- Op.68 – Fantaisie et Rondeau sur une Marche Autrichienne for Piano
- Op.69 – Souvenirs de l'Irlande for Piano avec Orchestral Accompaniment(1826)
- Op.70 – 24 Etudes for Piano
- Op.71 – Rondeau Expressif on a Theme of Gallenberg for Piano (possibly also called Nocturne)
- Op.71a – Gems a la Pasta, Fantasia Dramatique for Piano
- Op.72 – 4 Fantasias (1826)
- Op.73 – 50 Preludes for Piano
- Op.74 – Les Charmes de Londres. Rondeau brilliant précédé d'une Introduction for Piano
- Op.75 – Anklänge aus Schottland. Fantasie über schottische Nationallieder for Piano & Orchestra (or Quartett) (1826)
- Op.76 – La belle Union. Rondeau brilliant précédé d'une Introduction for Piano Four–Hands (1828)
- Op.77 – Allegro di Bravura for Piano (1824)
- Op.78 – Divertimento à la Savoyarde for Piano & Flute or Violin
- Op.79 – Sonate Concertante for Piano & Flute or Violin (1828)
- Op.80 – Fantaisie sur des Airs des Bardes Ecossais for Piano avec Orchestra (1828)
- Op.81 – Symphony No.1 in C Major (1828)
- Op.82a – Rondo Sentimental for Piano
- Op.82b – 4 Divertissements for Piano & Flute
- Op.83 – Souvenirs de Denmark for Piano avec Orchestra (1830)
- Op.84 – Piano Trio (1830)
- Op.85 – La Gaieté Rondeau brilliant précédé d'un Andante expressif for Piano
- Op.86a – Marche Façile avec Trio for Piano Four-Hands
- Op.86b – Souvenir de Rubini. Fantaisie dramatique pour le Pianoforte, dans laquelle est introduit une Cavatine favorite de l'Opera Anna Bolena
- Op.87 – Piano Concerto No.5 in C Major (1830)
- Op.87a – Souvenir de l'Opéra. Fantaisie dramatique pour le Pianoforte sur des airs favoris chantés à Londres par Madame Pasta
- Op.87b – Duo concertant pour deux Pianos avec Accompagnement d'Orchestre (ad lib.) en Variations brillantes sur la Marche Bohémienne tirée du Mélodrame Preciosa de C. M. de Weber, composé par Felix Mendelssohn–Bartholdy et I. Moscheles (C minor)
- Op.88 – Grand Septuor pour Pianoforte, Violon, Alto, Clarinet, Cor, Violoncelle et Contrabasse (1832–33)
- Op.89 – Impromptu in E♭ Major for Piano (1834)
- Op.90 – Piano Concerto No.6 in B♭ Major Concert fantastique (1834, published 1836)
- Op.91 – La Pucelle d'Orléans (Jeanne d'Arc), Overture for Orchestra (1834)
- Op.92 – Hommage a Handel, Grand Duo for Two Pianos (1822 & 1835)
- Op.93 – Piano Concerto No.7 in C minor (1835)
- Op.94a – Rondeau Brillant sur la Romance favorite de N. I. Dessauer, Le Retour des Promis for Piano
- Op.94b – Hommage Caractéristique à la Mémoire de Madame Malibran de Bériot, en forme de Fantaisie for Piano (1836)
- Op.95 – 12 Etudes for Piano (1837)
- Op.96 – Piano Concerto No.8 in D Major (1838) (orchestral parts lost)
- Op.97 – 6 Lieder (also published as Op.79) (1840)
- Op.98 – 2 Etudes for Piano (1840)
- Op.99 – Tutti Frutti, 6 Nouvelles Melodies for Piano
- Op.100 – Ballade in A♭ minor for Piano
- Op.101 – Romance et Tarantelle Brillante for Piano (1841)
- Op.102 – Hommage à Weber. Grand Duo for Piano Four–Hands sur des motifs d'Euryanthe et d'Oberon
- Op.103 – Serenade in F Major for Piano (1841)
- Op.104 – Romanesca in D minor for Piano (1841)
- Op.105 – 2 Etudes for Piano (1841)
- Op.106 – Fantaisie brillante For Piano sur une Cavatine de l'Opera Zelmire de Rossini et une Ballade de l'Enlèvement du Serail de Mozart
- Op.107 – Tägliche Studien über die harmonisirten Scalen zur Uebung in den verschiedensten Rhythmen, ein Cyclus von 59 vierhändigen Charakterstücken in allen Dur- und Moll-Tonarten mit vollständigem Fingersatz für das Pianoforte. 2 volumes. (1842–43)
- Op.108 – 2 Fantaisie Brillantes for Piano, sur des Airs favoris de l'Opéra de Balfe, La Bohémienne
- Op.109a – Fantaisie Brillante sur des Thèmes Favoris de l'Opéra Don Pasquale for Piano (1843)
- Op.109b – Mélange pour le Pianoforte sur la Sérénade et d'autres Airs favoris de l'Opéra Don Pasquale de Donizetti (1843)
- Op.110 – Gondolier's Lied for Piano
- Op.111 – 4 Grandes Etudes de Concert (1845)
- Op.112 – Grande Sonate Symphonique No. 2 in B minor for Piano Four-Hands (1845)
- Op.113 – Album des Chants favoris de Pischek transcrits pour le Piano en forme de Fantaisie Brillante
- Op.114 – Souvenirs de Jenny Lind. Fantaisie Brillante pour le Piano sur des Airs Suédois, Chantés par Cette Célèbre Cantatrice (1847)
- Op.115 – Les Contrastes, Grand Duo for 2 Pianos, 8 Hands
- Op.116 – Freie Kunst, Gedicht von Uhland für eine Bass- oder Altstimme mit Begleitung des Pianoforte (1847)
- Op.117 – 6 Lieder (1847)
- Op.118 – Grand Valse in D♭ Major for Piano
- Op.119 – 6 Gesänge für eine Singstimme mit Begleitung des Piano
- Op.120 – Mazurka Appassionata in D minor for Piano
- Op.121 – Cello Sonata in E (1850–51)
- Op.122 – Die Erwartung (l'Attente). Nach Schillers Gedicht. Fantasie for Piano
- Op.123 – Magyaren-Klänge. Original-Fantasie for Piano
- Op.124 – Sehnsucht (nach Schillers Gedicht). Fantasie for Piano
- Op.125 – Frühlingslied für eine Sopran- oder Tenorstimme mit Pianofortebegleitung
- Op.126 – Grosse Concert-Etude for Piano (1856)
- Op.127 – Scherzo in B♭ Major for Piano
- Op.128 – Humoristische Variationen, Scherzo und Festmarsch for Piano (1856)
- Op.129 – Der Tanz. Characterstück (nach Schillers Gedicht) for Piano (1858)
- Op.130 – Symphonisch-Heroischer Marsch über Deutsche Volkslieder, nach der Partitur für das Piano zu vier Händen bearbeitet
- Op.131 – 6 Lieder
- Op.132 – 5 Duette for Soprano & Alto with Piano
- Op.133 – Reverie Melodique for Piano
- Op.134 – Toccata in F♯ minor for Piano (1860)
- Op.135 – Pastorale im Orgel-Style (1860)
- Op.136 – An G. Rossini. Am Bache, Lied mit obligater Begleitung for Horn or Cello & Piano
- Op.137a – Studies in Melodious Counterpoint (Melodisch-contrapunktische Studien) for Pianoforte and Cello (10 Preludes from Bach's 48 with added cello obbligato) (1861)
- Op.137b – Studies in Melodious Counterpoint (Melodisch-contrapunktische Studien) for Pianoforte and 2nd Pianoforte (10 Preludes from Bach's 48 with second piano) (1861)
- Op.138 – Feuillet d'Album de Rossini for Piano & Horn or Viola
- Op.139 – Lied im Volkston - Variations for Piano Duet
- Op.140 – Familienleben (Domestic Life)- 12 Progressive Pieces for Piano Duet (1866)
- Op.141 – March and Scherzo as Rhythmic Exercises (Piano Duet)
- Op.142 – 3 Charakterstücke for Piano Duet (1869)

== Works Without Opus Number ==
- Souvenirs de Belisaire. Deux Fantaisies pour le Pianoforte sur des Airs favoris de l'Opera de Donizetti, "Belisario"
- Fantasia sur Verdi's Opera I Lombardi
- Fantasia on Verdi's Opera Nabucodonosor
- Fantasia on 'Potem Mitzwo!'
- Fantaisie pour le Piano sur des motifs de "Fallstaff" de Balfe (A major)
- Fantaisie sur des Thèmes de l'Opéra "Obéron" pour le Pianoforte (D major)
- Fantasia Brillante on Benedict's Opera 'The Bride of Venice'
- Fantaisie à la Paganini pour le Pianoforte seul, arrangée d'après plusieurs motifs, passages etc. exécutés par lui dans ses Concerts. (Also under the title: Bijoux à la Paganini. Fantaisie brillante dans le Style de cet artiste) (1831)
  - No. 1: Fantasia: Alla Militare (B♭ major) – Andante espressivo (G minor)
  - No. 2: Introduzione: Allegro con brio (B minor – D major)
- Fantaisie sur des Motifs de l'Opéra "Le Siége de Rochelle" de Balfe pour Piano (E♭ major)
- Bouquet des Mélodies. Petite Fantaisie sur des Airs favoris pour le Pianoforte (F major)
- The Popular Barcarolle, "Or che in cielo" sung by Signore Ivanoff, in Donizetti's Opera, "Marino Faliero" arranged as a Fantaisie with Variations for the Pianoforte
- 4 Pensées fugitives pour le Piano
- Écho des Alpes. Divertissement pour le Pianoforte sur trios Airs pastorales: de la Suisse (B♭ major)
- Die Tyrolerfamilie. Drittes Divertissement für das Pianoforte (F major)
- Divertissement sur des Airs tiroliens etc. chantés per la famille Rainer pendant son séjour à Londres, pour le Pianoforte
- Divertissement sur des Airs suisses nationaux pour le Pianoforte
- Rondo über eine beliebte schottische Melodie für das Pianoforte (G major)
- Rondo militaire pour le Piano sur le Duo favori, "Entendez vous" de "La Fiancée" d'Auber (1830)
- Abschiedsmarsch des löblichen Infanterie-Regiments Kaiser Alexander bei Gelegenheit seines Ausmarsches von Wien am 12ten April 1815, zum Kampfe für *Deutschlands Freiheit, für das Pianoforte (G major) (1815)
- 2 grosse Märsche für das Regiment Kaiser Alexander für das Pianoforte
- Marsch des 2ten Regiments Wiener Stadtmiliz für das Pianoforte (C major)
- Favorit-Marsch mit Trio (des Regiments Kutschera & Max Joseph) für das Pianoforte auf 4 Hände (D major) Für das Pianoforte solo unter dem Titel, "Marche militaire."
- Rhapsodie champêtre pour le Piano (E major)
- Der Abschied der Troubadours. Romance mit deutschen und italienischen Texte. Unterhaltungsstück für Gesang, Pianoforte, Guitare und Violine mit abwechselnden Variationen von Moscheles, Giulani und Mayseder (F major)
- Musik bei der Anwesenheit der hohen Alliirten gehaltenen Schlittenfahrt, für das Pianoforte eingerichtet. Auch unter dem Titel: Course de Traineaux. (D major)
- 3 Mode-Walzer für das Pianoforte
- 12 Deutsche Tänze sammt Trios und Coda für das Piano (1812)
- 6 Valses pour le Pianoforte
- 6 Écossaises pour le Pianoforte
- 6 Valses pour le Pianoforte
- Verständniss. Gedicht von C. Probald. In A. H. Payne's Album (B♭ major)
- Fantaisie pour le Piano sur des Airs de Neukomm (G minor) (1831)
- L'Élegante, Rondeau pour Piano (F major)
- Rondino à la Hongroise (G major)
- Cadenzas to Beethoven's Piano Concertos
- Un conte d'enfant, for piano four hands
- The Way of the World, for piano solo. This piece sounds exactly the same if played upside down as well
