= List of compositions by Emilio Pujol =

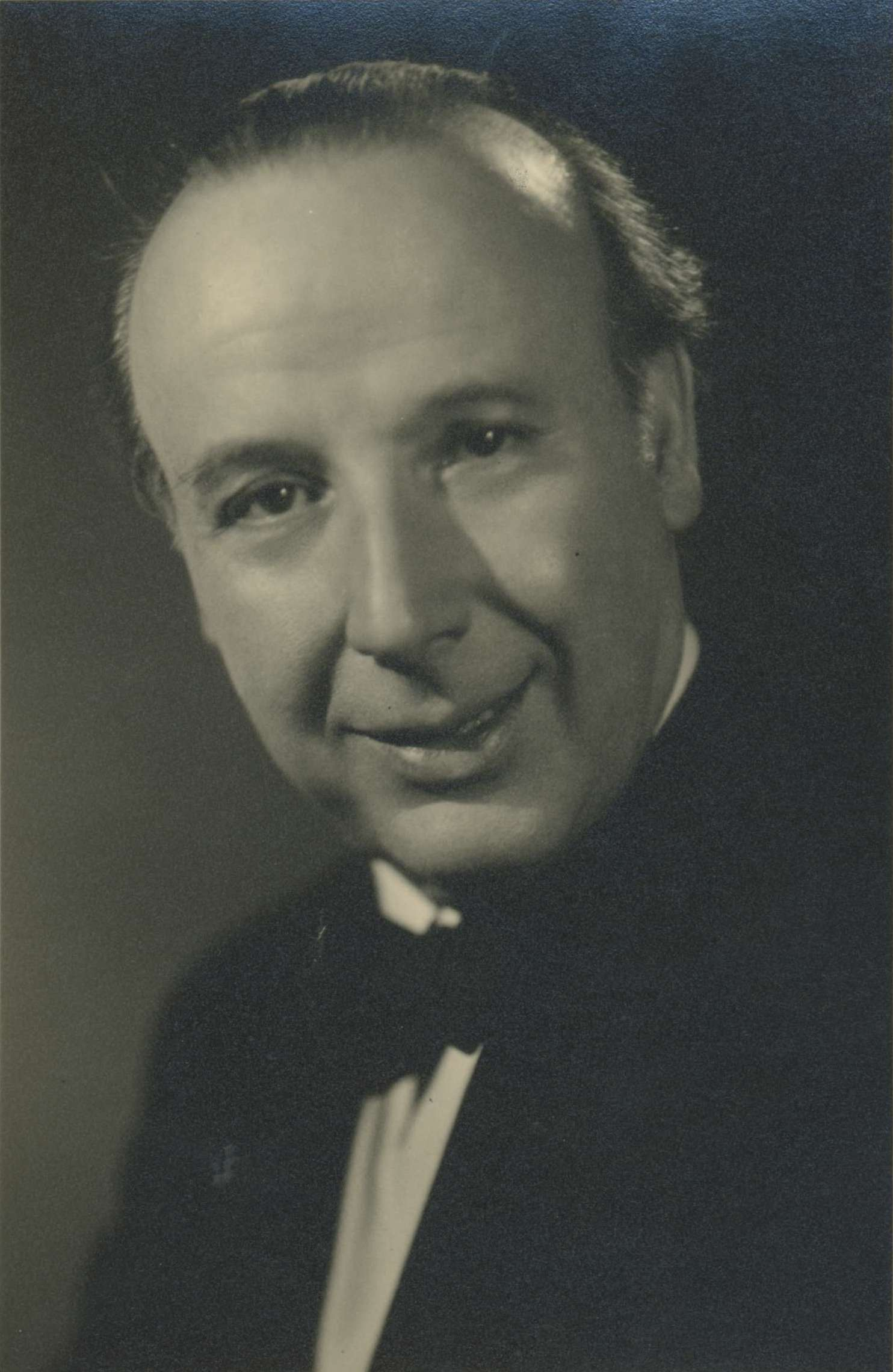
Emilio Pujol

The Spanish guitarist and composer Emilio Pujol or Emili Pujol Vilarrubí (1886–1980) composed 124 original works for the guitar and 275 transcriptions.

== Original compositions ==
=== ??? ===
- El Abejorro
- Ondinas
- Canción de Cuna
- Barcarolle
- Cubana
- Impromptu
- Piezas Españolas
- Pieza nº 2 (Guajira o Evocación Cubana)
- Pieza nº 3 (Tango Español)
- Preludios
- Scottish Madrileño
- Sevilla
- Danzas Españolas
- Tango

=== Solo guitar ===
- ME 7899 Aquelarre (Danse des sorcières – 1969) Pujol n°1246
- ME 7028 Atardecer (Crépuscule) Pujol n°1229
- ME 7238 Barcarolle Pujol n°1235
- ME 7580 Becqueriana (Endecha) Pujol n°1240
- ME 3130 Cancion de Cuna (Berceuse) Pujol n°1203
- ME 7884 Canto de Otono (Chant d’automne) Pujol n°1245
- ME 7939 Cap i Cua (Variation désuète sur l’exercice 19 d’Aguado) Pujol n°1248
- ME 7848 Caprice varié sur un thème d’Aguado Pujol n°1242
- ME 7541 Endecha a la Amada Ausente Pujol n°1238
- ME 2186 Étude n°1 Pujol n°1200
- ME 2187 Étude n°2 Pujol n°1201
- ME 2188 Étude n°3 Pujol n°1202
- ME 3128 Exercices en formes d’études, 1. Cahier Pujol n°1221
- ME 7847 2. Cahier Pujol n°1243
- ME 2189 Impromptu Pujol n°1206
- ME 7579 La Libelula Pujol n°1239
- ME 2586–88 Trois Morceaux espagnols:
1. Tonadilla
2. Tango
3. Guajira Pujol n°1204
- ME 3129 Pequena Romanza Pujol n°1222
- ME 7885 Pizzicato Pujol n°1247
- ME 7236 Deux Préludes Pujol n°1233
- ME 7027 Rapsodie Valenciana Pujol n°1228
- ME 2190 Sevilla (Evocation) Pujol n°1205
- ME 7030 Triquilandia (Jugando al Escondite) Pujol n°1231
- ME 7237 2e Triquilandia:
1. Œdipe et le Sphinx
2. Variation
3. Jeu
4. La Plume de perdreau
5. Branle bourguignon Pujol n°1234
- ME 7533 3e Triquilandia
1. Le Petit Grenadier
2. Cantilène
3. Valse Pujol n°1241
- ME 7991 Triptyque campagnard (1971):
1. Aube
2. Bucolique
3. Fête Pujol n°1249
- ME 7883 Variations sur un thème obsédant Pujol n°1244
- ME 7029 Veneciana Pujol n°1230

=== Guitar duos ===
- ME 8046 Canaries (Canarios), air de danse populaire ancienne Pujol n°1415
- ME 8081–01 Duet (étude) Pujol n°1417a
- ME 6942 Manola del Avapies (Tonadilla) Pujol n°1403
- ME 7239 Ricercare Pujol n°1409
- ME 8081 Tyrolienne (Tirolesa) Pujol n°1417b

(Verleger: Max Eschig Paris)

== Transcriptions ==
=== Guitar duo ===
Francis Poulenc (1899–1963). Waltzes, arr from the piano Paris : Editions M. Eschig, c. 1970
