= List of compositions by Alexander Mosolov =

This is a selected list of compositions by Alexander Mosolov. It includes all works with an opus number regardless of the date of publication as well as all known works composed before 1936, as it has been noted that it was "impossible to discern the former avant-gardist in the works written from the late thirties onward" (Frolova-Walker 1998, p. 336n8). Note - according to the New Grove Dictionary of Music and Musicians (1980) entry on Mosolov, many of his compositions are lost.

== By genre ==
=== Piano ===
- Op. 3, Sonata No. 1 (1924)
- Op. 4, Sonata No. 2 (1923–1924)
- Op. 6, Sonata No. 3 (initially Op. 8; lost; 1924)
- Op. 11, Sonata No. 4 (1925)
- Op. 12, Sonata No. 5 (1925)
- Op. 15, Two Nocturnes (1926)
- Op. 23a, Three Pieces (1927)
- Op. 23b, Two Dances (1927)
- Turkmenian Nights (1928)
- Op. 31, Two Pieces on Uzbek Themes (1929)

=== Vocal ===
- Sphynx, cantata for tenor, choir, and orchestra (1925)
- Op. 1, Twilight (1923–1924)
- Op. 1, Two Songs on Revolutionary Texts (1920s)
- Op. 1, Two Poems for voice and piano (1924)
- Op. 1, Nos. 3 & 4, Two Poems for voice and piano (1924)
- Op. 6, Quatrain "Sphynx" for voice and piano (1920s)
- Op. 6, Three Quatrains for voice and piano
- Op. 7, Four Songs (n.d.)
- Two Poems in the Form of Etudes for voice and piano (1925)
- Op. 9, Three Keys for voice and piano (n.d.)
- Op. 10b, Ten Settings from Blok for voice and ensemble (1925)
- Op. 13, Three Vocalizations (1925)
- Op. 16, Offering, quatrains for voice and piano (1927)
- Op. 17, Four Settings for voice and string quartet (1926)
- Op. 18, Three Children's Scenes (1926)
- Op. 21, Four Newspaper Announcements
- Op. 25, Scorpion for voice and piano (1920s)
- Three Lyric Songs for voice and piano (initially Op. 7; 1929)
- Op. 33, Three Songs for voice and orchestra (1930s)
  1. Turkmenian Song
  2. Kyrgyz Song
  3. Afghan Song
- Op. 33a, Turkmenian Lullaby for chorus a capella (n.d.)
- Anti-religious Symphony (or Symphonic Poem; 1931)
- Kyrgyz Rhapsody for chorus, soloists, and orchestra (pre-1936)

=== Chamber ===
- Op. 2, Three Lyric Pieces for viola and piano (1922–1923)
- Op. 2, Elegy for cello and piano (n.d.)
- Op. 5, Legend for cello and piano (1924)
- Op. 17, Ballad for clarinet, cello, and piano (initially Op. 10; lost; perf. 1925)
- Sonata for cello and piano (1927)
- Op. 21a, Viola Sonata (1920s)
- Op. 24, String Quartet No. 1 (1926)
- Op. 26, Four Cadences and a Coda for string quartet (1920s)
- Op. 27, Dance Suite for piano trio (1920s)
- Op. 30, Wind Quartet (n.d.)

=== Orchestra ===
- Op. 9, Twilight (1925)
- Op. 14, Concerto No. 1 for piano and orchestra (1926–1927)
- Op. 19, Iron Foundry, orchestral episode from ballet Steel (1926–1927)
  - Op. 19a, Steel, ballet suite (perf. 1927)
- Symphony No. 1, 'Cuban' (1928)
- Op. 20, Symphony 0 (1929)
- Kyrgyz Suite (1930s)
- Op. 34, Concerto No. 2 for piano and orchestra (1932)
- Symphony No. 2 (1934)
- Uzbek Dance (1935)
- Gavotte and Minuet (1935)
- Concerto No. 1 for cello and orchestra (1935)
- Turkmenian Overture (pre-1936)
- Turkmenian Suite No. 1 (1936)
- Turkmenian Suite No. 2 (1936)
- Uzbek Suite (1936)
- Symphony No. 3 'Chant' (1937)
- Concerto for harp and orchestra (1939)
- Symphony No. 4 'Lermontov' (1940)
- Concerto No. 2 for cello and orchestra (1946)
- Symphony No. 5 (1965)
- Symphony No. 6 (incomplete)

=== Operas ===
- Op. 28, The Hero (1928)
- Op. 35, The Dam (1930)
- Signal (1941)
- Masquerade (1944)

=== Ballets ===
- Op. 19a, Steel, ballet suite in four episodes (1927)
  1. Iron Foundry
  2. In Prison
  3. At the Ball
  4. On the Square
- Four Moscows (1929) (note: Mosolov was to write the last movement, with the others to be written by Polovinkin, Alexandrov, and Shostakovich)
  - 4. Moscow in 2117

== By opus number ==
- Op. 1, Twilight (1923–1924)
- Op. 1, Two Songs on Revolutionary Texts (1920s)
- Op. 1, Two Poems for voice and piano (1924)
- Op. 1, Nos. 3 & 4, Two Poems for voice and piano (1924)
- Op. 2, Three Lyric Pieces for viola and piano (1922–1923)
- Op. 2, Elegy for cello and piano (n.d.)
- Op. 3, Sonata No. 1 (1924)
- Op. 4, Sonata No. 2 (1923–1924)
- Op. 5, Legend for cello and piano (1924)
- Op. 6, Quatrain "Sphynx" for voice and piano (1920s)
- Op. 6, Three Quatrains for voice and piano
- Op. 6, Sonata No. 3 (initially Op. 8; lost; 1924)
- Op. 7, Four Songs (n.d.)
- Op. 9, Three Keys for voice and piano (n.d.)
- Op. 9, Twilight (1925)
- Op. 10b, Ten Settings from Blok for voice and ensemble (1925)
- Op. 11, Sonata No. 4 (1925)
- Op. 12, Sonata No. 5 (1925)
- Op. 13, Three Vocalizations (1925)
- Op. 14, Concerto No. 1 for piano and orchestra (1926–1927)
- Op. 15, Two Nocturnes (1926)
- Op. 16, Offering, quatrains for voice and piano (1927)
- Op. 17, Ballad for clarinet, cello, and piano (initially Op. 10; lost; perf. 1925)
- Op. 17, Four Settings for voice and string quartet (1926)
- Op. 18, Three Children's Scenes (1926)
- Op. 19, Iron Foundry, orchestral episode from ballet Steel (1926–1927)
- Op. 19a, Steel, ballet suite in four episodes (1927)
  1. Iron Foundry
  2. In Prison
  3. At the Ball
  4. On the Square
- Op. 21, Four Newspaper Announcements
- Op. 21a, Viola Sonata (1920s)
- Op. 23a, Three Pieces (1927)
- Op. 23b, Two Dances (1927)
- Op. 24, String Quartet No. 1 (1926)
- Op. 25, Scorpion for voice and piano (1920s)
- Op. 26, Four Cadences and a Coda for string quartet (1920s)
- Op. 27, Dance Suite for piano trio (1920s)
- Op. 28, Hero (1927)
- Op. 30, Wind Quartet (n.d.)
- Op. 31, Two Pieces on Uzbek Themes (1929)
- Op. 33, Three Songs for voice and orchestra (1930s)
  1. Turkmenian Song
  2. Kyrgyz Song
  3. Afghan Song
- Op. 33a, Turkmenian Lullaby for chorus a capella (n.d.)
- Op. 34, Concerto No. 2 for piano and orchestra (1932)
- Op. 35, The Dam (1929)

=== Without opus number ===
- Sphynx, cantata for tenor, choir, and orchestra (1925)
- Two Poems in the Form of Etudes for voice and piano (1925)
- Sonata for cello and piano (1927)
- Turkmenian Nights (1928)
- Three Lyric Songs for voice and piano (initially Op. 7; 1929)
- Four Moscows (1929) (note: Mosolov was to write the last movement, with the others to be written by Polovinkin, Alexandrov, and Shostakovich)
  - 4. Moscow in 2117
- Kyrgyz Suite (1930s)
- Baptism of Russia (1930)
- Anti-religious Symphony (or Symphonic Poem; 1931)
- Uzbek Dance (1935)
- Gavotte and Minuet (1935)
- Concerto No. 1 for cello and orchestra (1935)
- Turkmenian Overture (pre-1936)
- Kyrgyz Rhapsody for chorus, soloists, and orchestra (pre-1936)
- Turkmenian Suite No. 1 (1936)
- Turkmenian Suite No. 2 (1936)
- Uzbek Suite (1936)
- Concerto for harp and orchestra (1939)
- Concerto No. 2 for cello and orchestra (1946)
