= List of compositions by Ignaz Brüll =

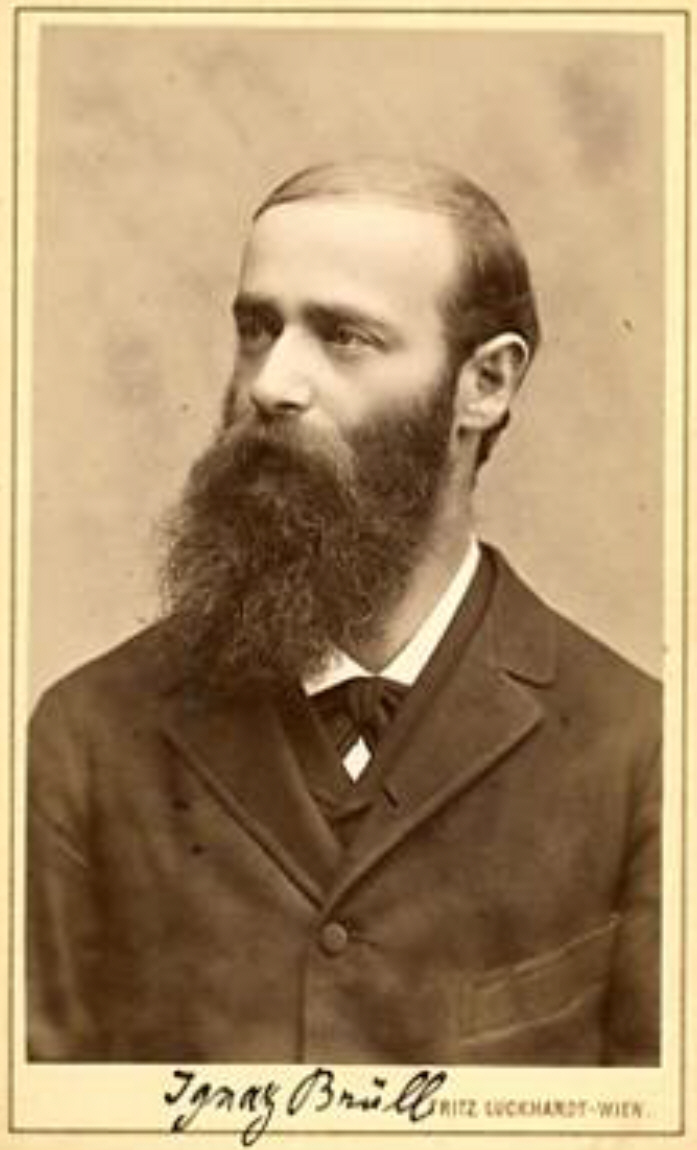
Ignaz Brüll

This is a list of compositions by Ignaz Brüll.

== Piano ==
=== Piano Solo ===
- Orientalisches Klagelied, Op. 3/1
- Ritt durch die Wüste, Op. 3/2
- Orientalisches Totenklage, Op. 3/3
- Tarantella, Op. 6
- Impromptu, Op. 7/1
- Humoreske, Op. 7/2
- Seven Fantasie pieces for piano, Op. 8
- Romance, Op. 11/1
- Impromptu, Op. 11/2
- Mazurka, Op. 11/3
- Schlummerlied, Op. 13/1
- Sartarella, Op. 13/2
- Romance, Op. 13/3
- Improvisata e Fuga, Op. 17
- Scherzo, Op. 20/1
- Scherzo, Op. 20/2
- Impromptu, Op. 28/1
- Romance, Op. 28/2
- Étude, Op. 28/3
- Sieben Albumblätter für die Jugend, Op. 33
- Mazurka, Op. 34/1
- Barcarole, Op. 34/2
- Capriccio, Op. 34/3
- Theme with Variations, Op. 35/1
- Mazurka, Op. 35/2
- Impromptu, Op. 37/1
- Idylle, Op. 37/2
- Paysage, Op. 37/3
- Romance, Op. 38/1
- Caprice, Op. 38/2
- Étude, Op. 38/3
- Impromptu, Op. 38/4
- Mazurka, Op. 38/5
- Bolero, Op. 38/6
- Theme with Variations, Op. 39
- Waltz-Impromptu, Op. 44/1
- Kleine Studie, Op. 44/2
- Theme with Variations, Op. 45
- Melodie, Op. 45/1
- Ballade, Op. 45/2
- Gavotte, Op. 47/1
- Phantasiestück, Op. 47/2
- Waltz, Op. 50/1
- Octaven Étude, Op. 50/2
- Berceuse, Op. 51/1
- Capriccio, Op. 51/2
- Scherzo-etude, Op. 51/3
- Valse-Caprice, Op. 53/1
- Melodie, Op. 53/2
- Gavotte, Op. 53/3
- Grande Valse, Op. 54/1
- Introduction and Tarantelle, Op. 54/2
- Menuet, Op. 54/3
- La Vendange, Op. 54/4
- Champagner-Märchen, Op. 54A
- Herbstabend, Op. 57/1
- Tarantelle, Op. 57/2
- Étude, OP. 57/3
- Romance, Op. 57/4
- Scherzo-Impromptu, Op. 57/5
- Präludium, Op. 58/1
- Scherzo, Op. 58/2
- Theme with Variations, Op. 58/3
- Gavotte, Op. 58/4
- 9 Études, Op. 61
- Mazurka, Op. 69/1
- Mazurka, Op. 69/2
- Ländler, Op. 69/3
- Präludium, Op. 71/1
- Scherzo, Op. 71/2
- Quasi Variazoni, Op. 71/3
- Rondo (in alter Weise), Op. 71/4
- Lied, Op. 72/1
- Mazurka, Op. 72/2
- Marsch, Op. 72/3
- Schlummerlied, Op. 72/4
- Walzer, Op. 72/5
- Scherzo, Op. 72/6
- Im Walde, Op. 72/7
- In der Mühle, Op. 72/8
- Piano Sonata in D minor, Op. 73
- Präludium, Op. 76/1
- Capriccio, Op. 76/2
- Legende, Op. 76/3
- Sarabande, Op. 76/4
- Ballade, Op. 76/5
- Aria and Scherzo, Op. 76/6
- Präludium, Op. 80/1
- Menuett, Op. 80/2
- Cavatine, Op. 80/3
- Scherzo, Op. 80/4
- Finale, Op. 80/5
- Nocturne, Op. 83/1
- Ophelia, Op. 83/2
- Barcarolle, Op. 83/3
- Capriccio, Op. 83/4
- Ballade, Op. 84
- Tanzweise, Op. 89/1
- In slawischer Weise, Op. 89/2
- Berceuse, Op. 93/1
- Impromptu, Op. 93/2
- Reigen, Op. 93/3
- Gondoliera, Op. 94/1
- Mache à la Japonaise, Op. 94/2
- Barcarolle and Tarantelle, Op. 96/1
- Liebliche Landschaft, Op. 96/2
- Gnomenmärchen, Op. 96/3
- Menuett, Op. 101/1
- Gavotte, Op. 101/2
- Novellette, Op. 102/3
- Berceuse
- Spanischer Tanz
- Walzer

=== Two Pianos ===
- Sonata for two pianos, Op. 21
- Duo for two pianos, Op. 64

== Chamber music ==
=== Violin and Piano ===
- Suite for Piano and Violin, Op. 42
- Violin Sonata No. 1, Op. 48
- Violin Sonata No, 2, Op. 60
- Violin Sonata No. 3, Op. 81
- Mazurka for Violin and Piano, Op. 90/1
- Tarantelle for Violin and Piano, Op. 90/2
- Espagnole for Violin and Piano, Op. 90/3
- Violin Sonata No. 4, Op. 97

=== Cello and Piano ===
- Cello Sonata, Op. 9

=== Piano Trio ===
- Piano Trio in E-flat major, Op. 14

== Orchestral ==
=== Symphonies ===
- Symphony in E minor, Op. 31

=== Piano and Orchestra ===
- Piano Concerto No, 1 in F major, Op. 10
- Piano Concerto No. 2 in C major, Op. 24
- Rhapsody for Piano and Orchestra, Op. 65
- Allegro and Andante for Piano and Orchestra, Op. 88
- Tanzweisen for Piano two hands, four hands and orchestra, Op. 89

=== Violin and Orchestra ===
- Violin Concerto in A minor, Op. 41

=== Other ===
- Im Walde, overture for Orchestra, Op. 25
- Serenade No. 1 in F for Orchestra, Op. 29
- Serenade No. 2 in E for Orchestra, Op. 36
- Macbeth, overture for Orchestra, Op. 46
- Tanzsuite aus der Ballettmusik: Ein Märchen aus der Champagne für Orchester, Op. 54
- Serenade No. 3 in F for Orchestra, Op. 67
- Waltz for Female choir and Orchestra, Op. 91
- Overture Pathétique for Orchestra, Op. 98
- Three intermezzi for Orchestra, Op. 99

== Opera ==
- Das goldene Kreuz, Op. 27
- Der Landfriede, Op. 30
- Königin Mariette, Op. 40
- Das steinerne Herz, Op. 55
- Gringoire, Op. 66
- Schach dem König, Op. 70
- Der Husar, Op. 79

== Choral Music ==
- Zwei Männerchören, Op. 16
- Zyklus Toskanischer Lieder, Op. 22
- Süßes Begräbnis, Op. 23
- Zwei Chöre, Op. 26
- Zwei Männerchöre, Op. 59
- Drei Männerchöre
- Frauenchöre

== Lieder ==
- Träum ich oder wach ich, Op. 1/1
- Abendlied, Op. 1/2
- Nachtreise, Op. 1/3
- Lebewohl, Op. 2/1
- Nachtlichte, Op. 2/2
- Das Ständchen, Op. 2/3
- Es schauen die Blumen alle, Op. 5 H.I,1
- Wenn ich auf dem Lager liege, Op. 5 H.I,2
- Jedweder Geselle sein Mädel am Arm, Op. 5 H.I,3
- Sie liebten sich beide, Op. 5 H.I,4
- Ich wollt', meine Schmerzen ergössen sich, Op. 5 H.I,5
- Manch' Bild vergess'ner Zeiten, Op. 5 H.I,6
- Das verlassene Mägdlein, Op. 5 H.II,1
- Ligurisches Volkslied, Op. 5. HII,2
- Waldeinsamkeit, Op. 5 H.II,3
- Am Traunsee, Op. 5 H.III,1
- Der schwere Abend, Op. 5 H.III,2
- Trauer, Op. 5 H.III,3
- Sehnsucht, Op. 12/1
- Gewitternahen, Op. 12/2
- Ein Aufatmen, Op. 12/3
- O süße Mutter, Op. 12/4
- Die alte Weide, Op. 15 H.I,1
- Meiner Mutter ihr Spinnrad, Op. 15 H.I,1
- Schlummerlied, Op. 15 H.II,1
- Christbaum, Op. 15 H.II,2
- Nanny, meine Rose, Op. 18/1
- Wie lang und traurig ist die Nacht, Op. 18/2
- Peggy, Op. 18/3
- Polly Stewart, Op. 18/4
- Jessie, Op. 18/5
- Es war 'ne Man, Op. 18/6
- Mein Eigen soll sie sein, Op. 19 H.I,1
- Abschied, Op. 19 H.I,2
- Gruß, Op. 19 H.I,3
- Liedchen der Sehnsucht, Op. 19 H.I,4
- An die Strene, Op. 19 H.II,1
- An einen Schmetterling, Op. 19 H.II,2
- Sehnsucht, Op. 32/1
- Es war im Mai, Op. 32/2
- Gerstennähren, Op. 32/3
- Das zerbrochene Ringlein, Op. 43/1
- Zigeunerlager, Op. 43/2
- Ständchen, Op. 43/3
- Hohes Lied, Op. 43/4
- Niedlich' Schätzchen, Op. 49/1
- Die Holde Pech, Op. 49/2
- Mein Treues Lieb Nancy, Op. 49/3
- Mein Stren, Op. 52/1
- Das Meeresleuchten, Op. 52/2
- Die Pappeln, Op. 52/3
- Die Verlassene, Op. 52/4
- Die blinde Mutter, Op. 56/1
- Wiegenlied, Op. 56/2
- Menie, Op. 56/3
- Um Mitternacht, Op. 56/4
- Wo?, Op. 56/5
- Einmal noch, Op. 56/6
- Lied, Op. 56/7
- Wenn still mit seinen letzten Flammen, Op. 62/1
- Du fragst mich, Op. 62/2
- Ländliches Frühlingslied, Op. 62/3
- Gondoliera, Op. 62/4
- Liebesglück, Op. 62/5
- Antwort, Op. 63/1
- Abendlied, Op. 63/2
- Phillis, mein Kind, Op. 63/3
- Herab von den Bergen, Op. 63/4
- Vom Mummelsee, Op. 63/5
- Vergessen, Op. 68/1
- Willst du mein sein, Op. 68/2
- Gute Nacht, Op. 68/3
- Lied der Spinnerin, Op. 68/4
- Weißt du noch?, Op. 74/1
- In dunkler Nacht, Op. 74/2
- Täglich, wenn der Abend naht, Op. 74/3
- Durch das abendliche Dunkel, Op. 75/1
- Kleine Welt, Op. 75/2
- Auf einsamen Wegen, Op. 75/3
- So oft ich deine sah, Op. 77/1
- O Glaube, wenn von deiner Huldgestalt, Op. 77/2
- Der Augenstern, Op. 77/3
- Die Harfe, die für dich erklungen, Op. 77/4
- Mädchens Abendgedanken, Op. 78/1
- Ger nam kühlen Waldessaum, Op. 78/2
- O Gib die Seele mir zurück, Op. 78/3
- Am Weßdorn, Op. 78/4
- Vom Wald bin i fura, Op. 82/1
- Wann i Geh, Op. 82/2
- 's launische Dirndl, Op. 82/3
- Mei Dirndl is sauba, Op. 82/4
- Der Abschied, Op. 82/5
- Der Steinhauer, Op. 85/1
- Sechse, sieben oder acht, Op. 85/2
- Trinklied, Op. 85/3
- Dein' Augen, Op. 86/1
- Notturno, Op. 86/2
- Mein Odem möchte sich ein Plätzchen, Op. 86/3
- Du wirfst die Angel, Op. 86/4
- Die Spröde, Op. 87/1
- Die Bekehrte, Op. 87/2
- Nachtlied, Op. 92/1
- Auf dem Maskenball, Op. 92/2
- Wiegenlied für meinen Jungen, Op. 92/3
- Die Tänzerin, Op. 95/1
- Hochzeitlied, Op. 95/2
- Elisabeth (Meine Mutter hat’s gewollt), Op. 95/3
- Blaublümelein, Op. 95/4
- Beim Feste, Op. 100/1
- Ich glaub', Op. 100/2
- Letze Worte, Op. 100/3
- Zwei Könige, Lied, Op. 102
- Wir sind die Weihnachtsengel
- Nachtwandler
