= List of compositions by Jan Kalivoda =

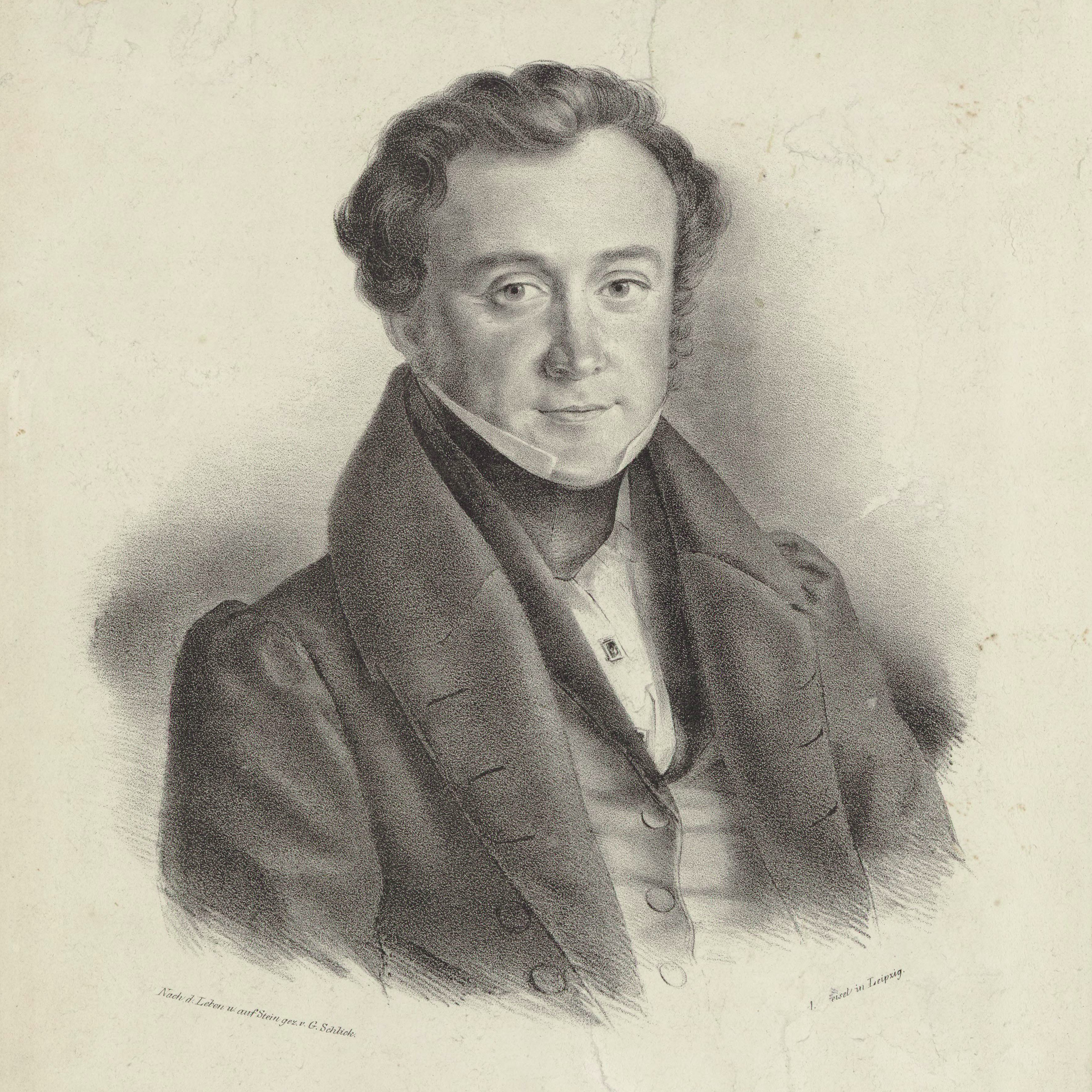
Jan Václav Kalivoda

This is a list of compositions by Jan Kalivoda.

== Orchestra ==
=== Overtures ===
- Overture No. 1 in D minor op. 38 (published by 1832)
- Overture No. 2 in F op. 44 (published by 1830)
- Overture No. 3 in C op. 55 (published by 1835)
- Festival Overture (No. 4) in E major op. 56 (published by 1835)
- Overture No. 5 in D op. 76 (pub. 1837)
- Overture No. 6 in E♭ op. 85 (first published 1839?) ("composée et dédiée à monsieur L. Spohr")
- Overture No. 7 in C minor op. 101, dedicated "a la Société du Concert d'Euterpe a Leipzig" (pub. 1840)
- Overture No. 8 "Ouverture pastorale", in A major op. 108
- Overture No. 9 "Ouverture solennelle", op. 126 (published by 1845)
- Overture No. 10 in F minor op. 142 (by 1845)
- Overture No. 11 op. 143 in B (B♭?) (pub.1847)
- Overture No. 12 in D major op. 145 (Composed by 1843 for Prince Egon II of Fürstenberg's Silver Wedding Anniversary, and dedicated to the members of the court orchestra. Published Leipzig: Peters, by 1849)
- Fürstenberg Anthem op. 145a (incorporated into No. 12.)
- Overture No. 14 in C minor op. 206 (published 1855)
- Overture No. 15 op. 226 "Prague Festival"
- Overture No. 16 in A minor op. 238
- Overture No. 17 op. 242 (around 1860)

=== Symphonies ===
- Symphony No. 1 in F minor op. 7 (premiered 1824)
- Symphony No. 2 in E♭ major, op. 17 (1829)
- Symphony No. 3 in D minor op. 32 (premiered March 10, 1830 in Donaueschingen; published around 1831) (score reviewed April 4, 1832 in the Allgemeine musikalische Zeitung, pp. 221–224)
- Symphony No. 4 in C op. 60 (1836)
- Symphony No. 5 in B minor op. 106 (pub. 1840)
- Symphony No. 6 in F major op. 132 (published 1845)
- Symphony No. 7 in G minor (WoO)

== Concertante ==
- Polonaise for violin with piano or orchestral accompaniment, no. 1, op. 8 (published in Bronsvic by Spehr about 1828). Exists also in version for string quartet.)
- Violin concerto No. 1 in E op. 9 (published by Breitkopf & Härtel about 1828)
- Variations brillantes für 2 Violinen und Orchester op. 14 (published 1829)
- Concertino for violin with piano or orchestral accompaniment, op. 15 (published 1829)
- Grand rondeau: pour le piano avec accompagnement de l'orchestre, op. 16
- Concertante for two violins with orchestra or piano, op. 20 (published 1830)
- Second concertino for violin (with piano or orchestra) in A op. 30 (around 1830)
- Second Potpourri for violin and piano or orchestra in D op. 36 (published around 1833)
- Grand rondeau: pour le violon avec accompagnement d'orchestre ou de pianoforte, op. 37 (published 1833)
- Second Polonaise for Violin with Orchestral accompaniment op. 45
- Introduction and rondo for horn and orchestra op. 51 (premiered in Donaueschingen on November 27, 1833; published around 1834)
- Divertimento for flute with piano or orchestra accompaniment op. 52 (about 1833)
- Variations and rondo for bassoon and orchestra. op. 57 (modern edition published 1976)
- Divertimento for oboe and orchestra op. 58 (published by 1835)
- Divertimento for two horns and orchestra op. 59 (republished by Edition Kunzelmann in 1981)
- Introduction, variations et rondeau pour le piano-forte avec accompagnement d’orchestre op. 71
- Third concertino for violin (or concerto) in D (with piano or orchestra) op. 72 (published 1836)
- Variations brillantes sur un thème original pour le violon avec accompagnement d'orchestre ou de pianoforte, op. 73 (about 1835)
- Introduction et rondeau facile pour le piano-forte avec accompagnement de 2 violons, viola et violoncelle (or orchestra), op. 82
- Variations concertantes (or Concerto) (for two violins with orchestral or piano accompaniment) op. 83, published around 1840
- Fourth concertino for violin (with piano or orchestra) in C op. 100 (pub. 1840)
- Introduction and rondo for two violins accompanied by piano or orchestra, op. 109 (published about 1843)
- Concertino for Oboe and Orchestra op. 110 (modern edition published 1974)
- Fantasie for Violin with Orchestra or Piano in E op. 125
- Introduction and variations for clarinet and orchestra op. 128 (1844 arrangement of a four-hand piano composition. Premiered in Leipzig on February 8, 1844.)
- Fifth concertino for violin and orchestra or piano in A op. 133 (published 1844)
- Third Divertissement for Violin and Orchestra op. 134
- Sixth concertino for violin and orchestra or piano op. 151 in D (pub. 1848)
- Concertino for flute, oboe and orchestra in F major

== String quartet ==
- String quartet no. 1 in E minor op. 61 (pub. 1835)
- String quartet no. 2 in A major op. 62 (pub. 1836) (published by Amadeus-Verlag in Winterthur, Switzerland in 1999)
- String quartet no. 3 in G major op. 90 (Moderato – Scherzo (Vivace in G minor) – Adagio (E♭ major) – Allegretto grazioso (G major)) (published by Peters in 1830)

== Chamber music ==
- Variations brillantes for violin op. 22
- Two duos for two violins op. 70
- Six new études or caprices for violin op. 87.
- Variations brillantes for violin and piano quintet op. 89.
- Introduction, romance et rondeau pour le violon op. 107
- Introduction et variations brillantes sun un thème original pour le violon, op. 118
- First grand trio concertante in F minor for piano forte, violin and violoncello, op. 121 (composed 1842; pub. Dresden: G. Paul, 1844)
- Variations de concert for piano quartet op. 129 (published around 1844)
- Second grand trio in B♭, op. 130 (composed 1844; published Leipzig: C. F. Peters, 1845 – publication date not in score but obtained from New Grove)
- Three duos for two violins op. 152
- Drei Duos für Zwei Violen op. 178 (Edition Peters Nr. 9082)
- Three Duos for two violins op. 179
- Six Nocturnes for Viola and Piano op. 186 (1851, published 1882); republished by Kalmus in 2003
- Third grand trio in E♭ major, op. 200 (composed 1855)
- Fantasy in F major for viola and piano op. 204 (1855)
- Duets for violin and viola op. 208 (1955)
- Morceaux de Salon for Oboe and Piano op. 228 (modern edition published 2001)
- Morceau de Salon for Clarinet and Piano op. 229 (modern edition published Winterthur: Amadeus-Verlag in 2002.)
- Morceau de Salon for Bassoon and Piano op. 230
- Two songs for harmonium and piano op. 250
- Serenade for flute, oboe, horn, bassoon and guitar

== Piano ==
- Polonaise for piano (two or four hands) (same work?) also op. 8 (published about 1830 by Bronsvic : Meyer)
- Rondo for piano op. 11 in A (published 1829)
- Trois Grandes Marches pour le Piano à quatre mains op. 26
- Divertissement in F major pour le Piano à quatre mains op. 28
- Fantaisie for Piano op.33 in E (pub. 1832)
- Grande Sonate in G minor pour le Piano à quatre mains op. 135 (pub. 1845) (recorded)
- Piano Sonata in E♭ major op. 176

== Vocal ==
- Six songs for alto or bass with piano accompaniment op. 79
- Six songs for various voice ranges with piano accompaniment op. 99 (published by Peters around 1865)
- Heimathlied (Homesong) for soprano, clarinet and piano, op. 117
- Three Songs for Alto or Baritone op. 182

== Choral ==
- Mass in A major op. 137 (four solo voices, chorus, and orchestra) (published in 1846)
- Four "Deutsche Chöre" for Men's Voices op. 233
- Mass in A minor (unaccompanied SATB chorus, not op. 137 which is in A major, and with orchestra) (published by Carus-Verlag in Stuttgart in 1999)
- Mass in G major (WoO VI/5) "per coro SAM" (ed. László Strauß-Németh) published by Stuttgart: Carus-Verlag in 2003.
- Mass in F major (WoO VI/3) (coro SATB) (ed. László Strauß-Németh) (published by Stuttgart: Carus-Verlag in 2006.)

== Opera and stage ==
- ”Die Audienz” (allegorical festive drama)
- ”Prinzessin Christine” (opera in three acts)
- ”Billibambuffs Hochzeitsreise zum Orcus und Olymp” (Fastnachtsspiel, a manner of burlesque popular in the 15th century)
- ”Blanda, die silberne Birke” (opera in three acts)
- Grande fantaisie sur des motifs de l’opéra Fra Diavo(e)lo, op. 41
