= List of compositions by Robert Volkmann =

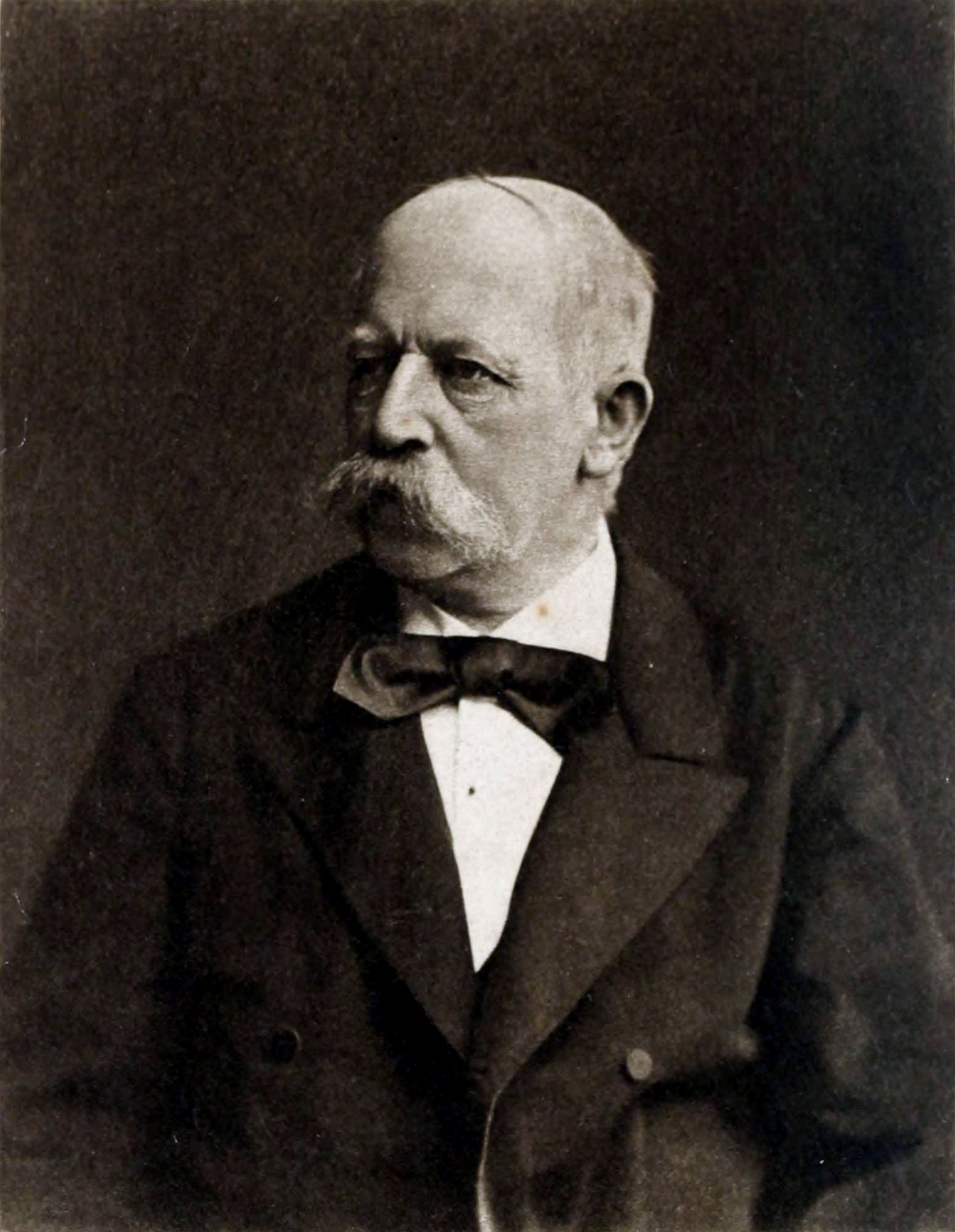
Robert Volkmann

This is an incomplete list of compositions by Robert Volkmann.

== Piano ==
=== Piano solo ===
- Six Fantasy Pictures, Op. 1
- Dythyrambe and Toccata, Op. 4
- Souvenir de Maróth, Op. 6
- Nocturne, Op. 8
- Piano Sonata in C minor, Op. 12
- Buch der Lieder, Op. 17
- Deutsche Tanzweisen, Op. 18
- Cavatine, Op. 19/1
- Barcarole, Op. 19/2
- Ungarische Lieder, Op. 20
- Visegrád, 12 musikalische Dichtungen (12 Musical Poems), Op. 21

1. Der Schwur (The Oath)
2. Waffentanz (Sword-Dance)
3. Beim Bankett (At the Banquet)
4. Minne (Love)
5. Blumenstück (Flower-Garden)
6. Brautlied (Wedding Song)
7. Die Wahrsagerin (The Sybil)
8. Pastorale
9. Das Lied can Helden (Song of Heroes)
10. Der Page (The Page)
11. Soliman
12. Am Salomonsthurm - Elegie (At Salomon's Tower - Elegy)

- 4 Marches, Op. 22
- Wanderskizzen, Op. 23
- Fantasia, Op. 25a
- Intermezzo, Op. 25b
- Variations on a Theme by Handel, Op. 26
- Lieder der Grossmutter, Op. 27
- 3 Improvisations, Op. 36
- Au tombeau du Comte Széchenyi – Fantaisie, Op. 41
- Ballade, Op. 51/1
- Scherzetto, Op. 51/2
- Variationes Humoris Causa
- Variations on the Rheinweinlied
- Capricietto

=== Piano, four hands ===
- Ungarische Skizzen (Hungarian Sketches) for piano, four hands, Op. 24 (1861)

1. Zum Empfange
2. Das Fischermädchen
3. Ernster Gang
4. Junges Blut
5. In der Kapelle
6. Ritterstück
7. Unter der Linde

- Lieder der Großmutter for piano, four hands, Op. 27 (1856)
- Die Tageszeiten, Op. 39 (1859)
- 3 Marches, Op. 40 (1859)
- Musicalisches Bilderbuch, Op. 11 (1852/53)

1. 'In der Mühle', Op. 11/1
2. ‘Der Postillon’, Op. 11/2
3. ‘Die Russen kommen’, Op. 11/3 (The Russians Are Coming)
4. ‘Auf dem See’, Op. 11/4
5. ‘Der Kuckuck und der Weihnachtsmann’, Op. 11/5
6. ‘Der Schäfer’, Op. 11/6

- Rondino and March Caprice, Op. 55 (1867)
- Sonatina for 2 Pianos, Op. 57 (1868)

== Chamber music ==
=== Violin and Piano ===
- Romance in E major for Violin and Piano, Op. 7
- Chant du Troubadour, Op. 10
- Allegretto capriccioso for Violin and Piano, Op. 15
- Rhapsody for Violin and Piano, Op. 31
- Sonatina No. 1 for Violin and Piano, Op. 60
- Sonatina No. 2 for Violin and Piano, Op. 61

=== Cello and Piano ===
- Capriccio for Cello and Piano, Op. 74

=== Piano Trio ===
- Piano Trio No. 1 in F major, Op. 3
- Piano Trio No. 2 in B♭ minor, Op. 5

=== String Quartet ===
- String Quartet No. 1 in A minor, Op. 9
- String Quartet No. 2 in G minor, Op. 14
- String Quartet No. 3 in G major, Op. 34
- String Quartet No. 4 in E minor, Op. 35
- String Quartet No. 5 in F minor, Op. 37
- String Quartet No. 6 in E♭ major, Op. 43

=== Other ===
- Trio for Viola, Cello and Piano, Op. 76
- Andante mit Variationen for Three Cellos
- Romanza for Trumpet, Horn and Euphonium

== Orchestra ==
=== Symphonies ===
- Symphony No. 1 in D minor, Op. 44
- Symphony No. 2 in B♭ major, Op. 53

=== Piano and Orchestra ===
- Konzertstück for piano and orchestra, Op. 42

=== Cello and Orchestra ===
- Cello Concerto in A minor, Op. 33

=== Voice and Orchestra ===
- 'An die Nacht', Fantasiestück for Alto and Orchestra, Op. 45

== Choral music ==
- Mass No. 1 in D major, Op. 28 for unaccompanied male choir (TTBB)
- Mass No. 2 in A♭ major, Op. 29 for unaccompanied male choir (TTTBB)
- 6 Songs, Op. 30 for unaccompanied male choir (TTBB)
- Offertorium: Osanna domino Deo, Op. 47
- 3 Songs, Op. 48
- 2 Songs, Op. 58
- Weihnachtslied, Op. 59
- Altdeutscher Hymnus, Op. 64
- Kirchenarie, Op. 65
- 2 Songs, Op. 70
- 3 Hochzeitslieder, Op. 71
- 2 Works, Op. 75
- Ich Halte Ihr Die Augen Zu
- Abendlied

== Lieder ==
- 5 Songs, Op. 2
- 3 Gedichte, Op. 13
- 3 Songs, Op. 16
- 3 Songs, Op. 32
- 3 Songs, Op. 38
- Songs, Op. 36
- Sappho, Op. 49
- 3 Songs, Op. 52 (translated into English by Helen Tretbar)
- Vom Hirtenknaben, Op. 56/1
- Erinnerung, Op. 56/2
- 3 Songs, Op. 66
- 6 Duets, Op. 67
- 3 Songs, Op. 72
- An die Nacht
