= List of compositions by Josef Tal =

This is a list of compositions by Josef Tal.

== Operas ==
Year Composed	WORK	DETAILS	PARTICIPANTS	PREMIERE
1955	Saul at Ein Dor	Text: Books of Samuel	soloists and orchestra	Michael Taube 1955, Tel Aviv
1958	Amnon and Tamar	libretto: Recha Freier, after Samuel II, 13	soloists, men's choir and orchestra	Heinz Freudenthal 1961, Jerusalem
1969	Ashmedai	libretto: Israel Eliraz	soloists, choir, orchestra & electronic music	Gary Bertini / Leopold Lindtberg 1971, Hamburg
1972	Masada 967	libretto: Israel Eliraz	soloists, choir, & electronic music	Gary Bertini / Leonard Schach 1973, Jerusalem
1974	The Temptation	libretto: Israel Eliraz	soloists, choir, orchestra & electronic music	Gary Bertini / Götz Friedrich 1976, München
1983	The Tower	libretto: Hans Keller	soloists, choir, orchestra & electronic music	Ádám Fischer / Siegfried Schoenbohm 1987, Berlin
1987	The Garden	libretto: Israel Eliraz	soloists & ensemble	Peter Löscher / Irmgard Schleier 1988, Hamburg
1993	Josef	libretto: Israel Eliraz	soloists, choir, orchestra	David Alden / Gary Bertini 1995, Tel Aviv

== Keyboard ==
Year Composed	WORK	DETAILS	PREMIERE
1931	Pieces	for piano 4-hands	
1936	Chaconne	for piano	
1937	Three Pieces	for piano	Grünthal 1939, Jerusalem
1945	Cum Mortuis In Lingua Mortua	7 Variations for piano on a theme by Moussorgsky	Grünthal 1945, Jerusalem
1946	Six Sonnets	for piano	Grünthal 1948, Tel Aviv
1949	Sonata	for piano	Grünthal 1950 Tel Aviv
1951	A Little Walk	for piano 4-hands	
1956	Five Inventions	for Piano	Lengyel(?) 1961
1962	Dodecaphonic Episodes	for piano	Tal 1963, Tel Aviv
1962	Concerto No. 4	for piano & magnetic tape	Tal 1962, Jerusalem
1964	Concerto No. 5	for piano & electronic music	Gerty Blacher-Herzog 1964, Berlin
1964 (Rev. 1977)	Concerto	for harpsichord & electronic music	Frank Pelleg 1964, Tel Aviv
1970	Concerto No. 6	for piano & electronic music	Tal 1970, Jerusalem
1975	Five Densities	for piano	Arnan Wiesel 1990, Tel Aviv
1983	Salva venia	for organ	Oscar Gottlieb Blarr 1984, Düsseldorf
1986	Essay I	for piano	Alan Sternfeld 1987, Israel
1988	A Tale in Four Parts	for piano 4-hands	
1988	Essay II	for piano	?
1989	Essay III	for piano	Alan Sternfeld 1990, Jerusalem
1997	Essay IV	for piano	Jeffrey Burns 1998, Düsseldorf
2000	Essay V	for piano	?

== Orchestral / Ensemble / Instrumental Solo ==
Year Composed	WORK	DETAILS	PREMIERE
1934	By the Rivers of Babylon	for cello & harp	Weissgerber / Szarvas 19?? (?)
1937	Suite	for cello	Hillel Zori 2010, Tel Aviv
1937	Sonata	for cello	Hillel Zori 2010, Tel Aviv
1939	Prelude	for chamber orchestra, flute & fagott	Grünthal 1939, Jerusalem
(before 1940)	Trois Novelettes	for symphony orchestra	Gottfried / IPO 2014, Tel Aviv
1940	Suite	for viola	Gideon Roehr 1946 Jerusalem
1940	Theme and Variations	for 2 pianos & percussion	Grünthal / Kaplan/ Liebenthal 1940, Jerusalem
1945	Concerto No. 1	for piano & orchestra	Grünthal / Schlesinger 1945 Jerusalem
1946	Exodus	symphonic poem for baritone & orchestra. Text: Exodus, Psalms	Bernardino Molinari 1947, Tel Aviv
1947	Lament	for cello & harp	Josef Weissgerber / Klari Szarvas 19?? (?)
1949	Hora	for cello & harp	Josef Weissgerber / Klari Szarvas 19?? (?)
1950	Reflections	for string orchestra	Michael Taube 1950, Tel Aviv
1951 (Rev. 1952)	Sonata	for violin & piano	Goren / Stanfield 1951, Jerusalem
1952	Sonata	for oboe & piano	Haas / Tal 1954 (?)
1952	Symphony No. 1		Artur Gelbrun 1955, Bruxelles
1953	Concerto No. 2	for piano & orchestra	Tal / Singer 1953, Jerusalem
1953	Duo	for 2 flutes	Hanoch Tel-Oren / Sharona Tel-Oren 1953, Israel
1953	Concerto	for viola & orchestra	Gideon Röhr / Heinz Freudenthal 1954, Haifa
1954	String Quartet No. 1		Alexander Tal / Yuval / Binyamini / Mense 1959, Tel Aviv
1956	Concerto No. 3	for tenor, piano & orchestra. Text: Eleazar Kalir	Taube / Tal 1956, Jerusalem
1957	Festive Vision	for symphony orchestra	Izler Solomon 1958, Jerusalem
1959	Intrada	for harp	Contestants of First Int. Harp Contest 1959, Jerusalem
1960	Symphony No. 2		Ronli-Riklis 1961, Jerusalem
1960	Sonata	for viola & piano	Ödön Pártos / Tal 1960, Tel Aviv
1960	Concerto	for cello & string orchestra	Uzi Wiesel / Ronli-Riklis 1961, Jerusalem
1961	Structure	for harp	Szarvas 1962, Israel
1963	String Quartet No. 2		New Israeli Quartet 1965, Tel Aviv
1965	Duo	for viola & piano	(?) 1965, Hamburg
1966	Wind Quintet		Danzi Quintet 1968, Amsterdam
1966	Three Compositions	for recorder & harpsichord	
1968	Fanfare	for 3 trumpets & 3 trombones	?
1969	Double Concerto	for violin, cello & chamber orchestra	Gary Bertini / Pinchas Zukerman / Uzi Wiesel 1970, Ein Gev
1971 (Rev. 1980)	Concerto	for harp & electronic music	Nicanor Zabaleta 1971, Johannesburg
1973	Treatise	for cello	Uzi Wiesel 1974, Tel Aviv
1973	Trio	for violin, cello & piano	Shulman / Toister / Silver 1985, Tel Aviv
1975	Shape	for chamber ensemble	Ralph Shapey 1976, Chicago
1976	Concerto	for flute & chamber orchestra	Aurèle Nicolet / Mendi Rodan 1977, Jerusalem
1976 (Rev 1987)	String Quartet No. 3		?
1977	Backyard	for chamber ensemble & tape (for choreography)	
1978	Symphony No. 3		Zubin Mehta 1979, Jerusalem
1979	Double Concerto	for 2 pianos & orchestra	Gary Bertini / Eden / Tamir 1981, Jerusalem
1980	Concerto	for clarinet & orchestra	Bertini / Walter Boeykens 1984, Jerusalem
1980	Movement	for tuba & piano	Margulies / Garten 1982, USA
1981 (Rev. 1986)	Dance of the Events	for orchestra	Gary Bertini 1982, Jerusalem
1982	Piano Quartet	for violin, viola, cello & piano	Cantilena Chamber Players 1982, New York
1982	Imago	for chamber orchestra	Arthur Weisberg 1983, Washington
1982	Chamber Music	for s-recorder, marimba & harpsichord	Manuela Christen / Hans-Peter Achberger / Urte Lucht 1987, Hamburg
1985	Symphony No. 4		Zubin Mehta 1987, Tel Aviv
1985	In Memoriam of a Dear Friend	for cello	Kaganovski 1986, Jerusalem
1986	Symphonic Fanfare		Houston Symphony Orchestra 1987, Houston
1989	Duo	for trombone & harp	Nitzan Har-Oz / Adina Har-Oz 1991, Israel
1989	Dispute	for harp	Contestants in the 11th International Harp Contest 1991, Jerusalem
1991	Symphony No. 5		Daniel Barenboim 1992, Berlin
1991	Symphony No. 6		Wolf-Dieter Hauschild 1992, Eschede (Germany)
1992	Duo	for oboe & English horn	
1994	Quartet	for t-saxophone, violin, viola & cello	Ein Habar / Braunstein / Kam / Plesser 1994, Hasselburg
1996	Perspective	for viola	Tabea Zimmermann 1996, Berlin
2005	Good Night	for 2 recorders	Manuela Christen / Eveline Lorandi 2010, Amriswil (Switzerland)

== Unaccompanied Solo ==
Year Composed	WORK	DETAILS	PREMIERE
1978 (Rev. 1982)	Scene	monodrama for soprano or tenor (to be acted). Text from Franz Kafka's diaries	Christine Anderson 1981, Cincinnati
1997	Schlichtheit	for baritone. Text: Jorge Luis Borges	Matteo de Monti 1997, Vienna
2000	Sonett an Orfeus	for baritone. Text: Rainer Maria Rilke (Sonett XXIX)	Matteo de Monti 2000, Jerusalem

== Solo Voice with One Instrument, Ensemble, or Orchestra ==
Year Composed	WORK	DETAILS	PREMIERE
1936	Drei Lieder der Ruhe (Three Songs of Serenity)	for soprano & piano. Texts: Paul Verlaine, Georg Heym, Christian Morgenstern	Hede Türk / Grünthal 1938, Jerusalem
1950	Festive Prologue	for narrator & 2 pianos. Text: Rachel Bluwstein	
1955	Three Songs	for soprano & piano. Texts: Rachel Bluwstein	Hilde Zadek / Tal 1955, Tel Aviv
1971	Song	for baritone or alto & ensemble. Texts: Heinrich Heine	Heljä Angervo 1972, Berlin
1975	My Child	for soprano & clarinet. Text: Natan Yonatan	Adi Etzion / Richard Lesser 1975, Tel Aviv
1975	Else – Hommage to Else Lasker-Schüler	chamber scene for mezzo-soprano, narrator & ensemble. Text: Israel Eliraz	Adi Etzion 1975, Tel Aviv
1978	Fürchte dich nicht	for baritone and double bass	
1987	Die Hand	dramatic Scene for soprano & cello. Text: Israel Eliraz	Catherine Gayer / Uzi Wiesel 1989, Jerusalem
1991	Wars Swept Through Here	for baritone & ensemble. Text: Israel Eliraz	Matteo de Monti / Helmut Keller 1992, Kassel
1991	Bitter Line	for baritone & ensemble. Text: Israel Eliraz	Friedrich Goldmann / Georg Christoph Biller 1991, Berlin
1993	Mein blaues Klavier (My Blue Piano)	for mezzo-soprano & piano. Text: Else Lasker-Schüler	Andión Fernández / Axel Bauni 1994 Berlin

== Choral Music A Capella / With Orchestra ==
Year Composed	WORK	DETAILS	PREMIERE
1936	On the Way	for 4 women voices. Texts: Rachel Bluwstein	
1949 Rev. 1954	Aleinu Leshabe'ach	for 3 voices women choir, tenor & piano (organ). Text: Siddur, Shalom Shabazi	Helfman / Putterman 1949, New York
1949	The Mother Rejoices	symphonic cantata. Text: Book of Maccabees	Freudenthal 1953, Jerusalem
1952	3 Songs for Choir	for choir. Texts: Song of Songs, Shalom Shabazi	Tal 1953, Jerusalem
1955	Succot Cantata	for soloists, mixed choir & orchestra. Text: Shacharit, Eleazar Kalir	Tal 1955, Jerusalem
? (After 1962)	God Full of Mercy	for mixed choir. Text: Yehuda Amichai	
1967	The Death of Moses	requiem for soloists, mixed choir, orchestra & electronic music. Text: Yehuda Ya'ari	Bertini 1967, Jerusalem
1968	Parade of the Fallen (Misdar Ha'Noflim)	cantata for soloists, choir & orchestra. Text: Haim Hefer	Mendi Rodan 1969, Jerusalem
1975	Death Came to the Wooden Horse Michael	for soloists, mixed choir & electronic music. Text: Nathan Zach	Avner Itai 1979, Jerusalem
1978	With All Thy Soul	cantata for soloists, equal voices boys' choir, mixed choir & ensemble. Text: 1 Maccabees (Apocrypha), Sefer Ha'Agada	Bertini 1978, Jerusalem
1985	Dream of the Circles	for baritone, choir & ensemble. Text: Nachman of Breslov	Avner Itai 1985, Tel Aviv
1987	Touch a Place	for solo voice & choir. Text: Israel Eliraz	Arnon Meroz 1987, Jerusalem

== Electronic Music (Unaccompanied) ==
Year Composed	WORK	DETAILS
1958	Exodus (II)	for choreography
1959	The Tale of the Shadow	for a radio play
1963	Ranges of Energy (Ver. I)	for choreography
1964 Rev. 1971, 1978	I Called Upon The Lord in Distress	for choreography
1968	Ashmedai - electronic overture of the opera	for choreography
1970	Variations	for choreography
1972	Frequencies 440–462	
1976	The Emigrants	for the theater play
1979	Shikaron Sinai	for a TV documentary
1981	L'Atelier	for the theater play
1990	Ranges of Energy (Ver. II) a.k.a. Rays of Energy	Talmark Notation Project
1992	Coincidentia Oppositorum (Etude No. 1)	Talmark Notation Project
