= Shalhevet =

Shalhevet or Shalheveth (Hebrew: שלהבת) is a Hebrew personal name meaning flame and may refer to the following:

- Shalheveth Freier, Israeli scientist
- Shalhevet Pass (2000–2001), Israeli victim of terrorism
- Shalhevet High School, a Jewish school in Los Angeles, California
- Shalhevet Ulpana, a Jewish school in Shoham, Israel
