= Recha Freier =

German-Israeli writer, teacher, folklorist, philologist and humanitarian

- רחה פריאר
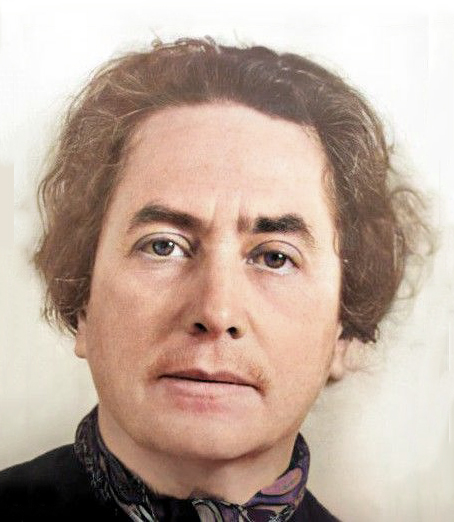
- Born: Recha Schweitzer; 29 October 1892; Norden, East Frisia, German Empire
- Died: 2 April 1984 (aged 91); Jerusalem, Israel
- Occupations: Social activist, poet, musician, teacher
- Known for: Founder of Youth Aliyah
- Spouse: Rabbi Dr. Moritz "Moshe" Freier
- Children: Shalhevet Freier; Ammud Freier; Zerem Freier; Ma'ayan Freier
- Awards: Israel Prize (1981); Honorary Doctorate from the Hebrew University of Jerusalem (1975)

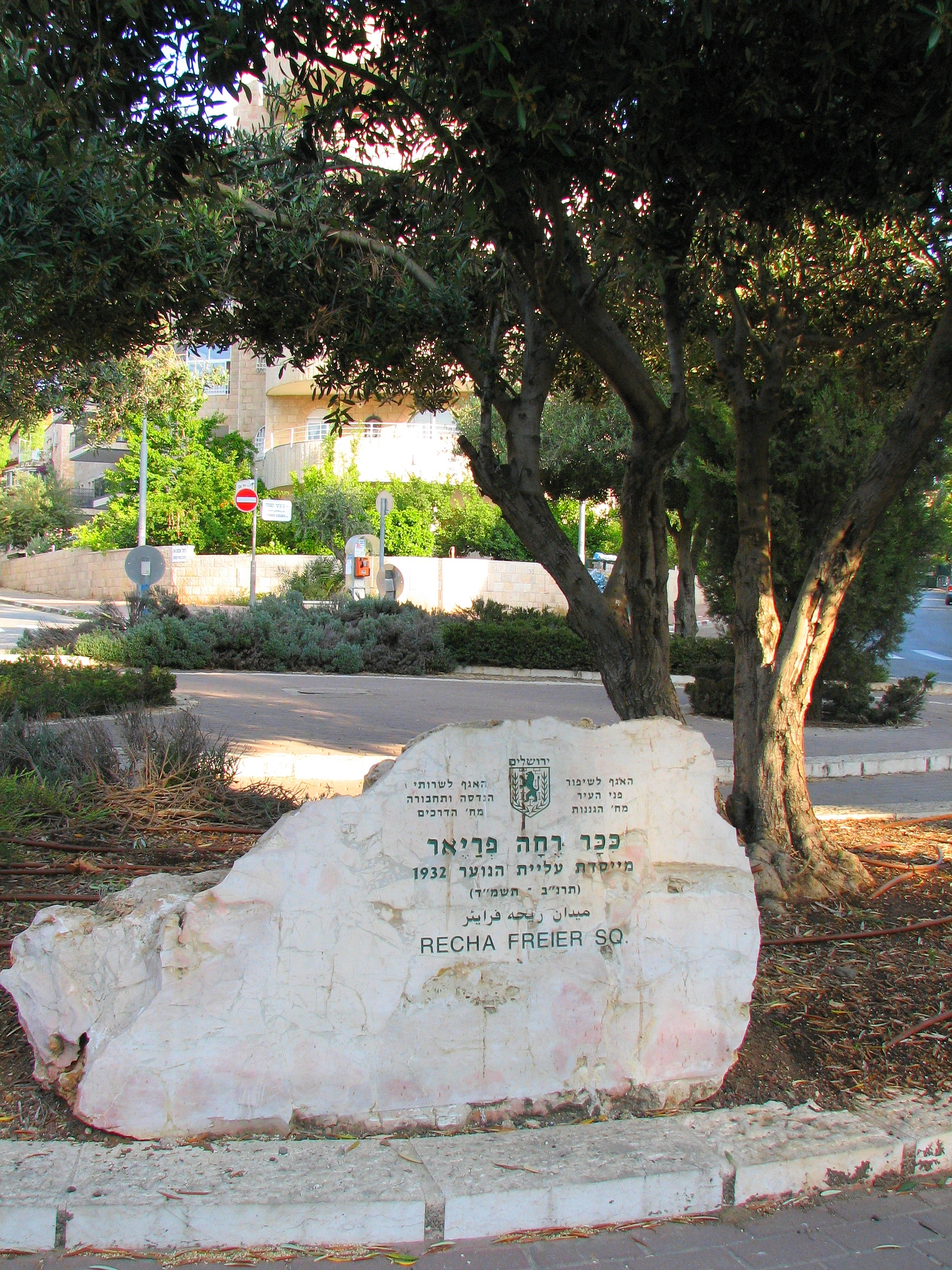
Recha Freier Square, Katamon, Jerusalem

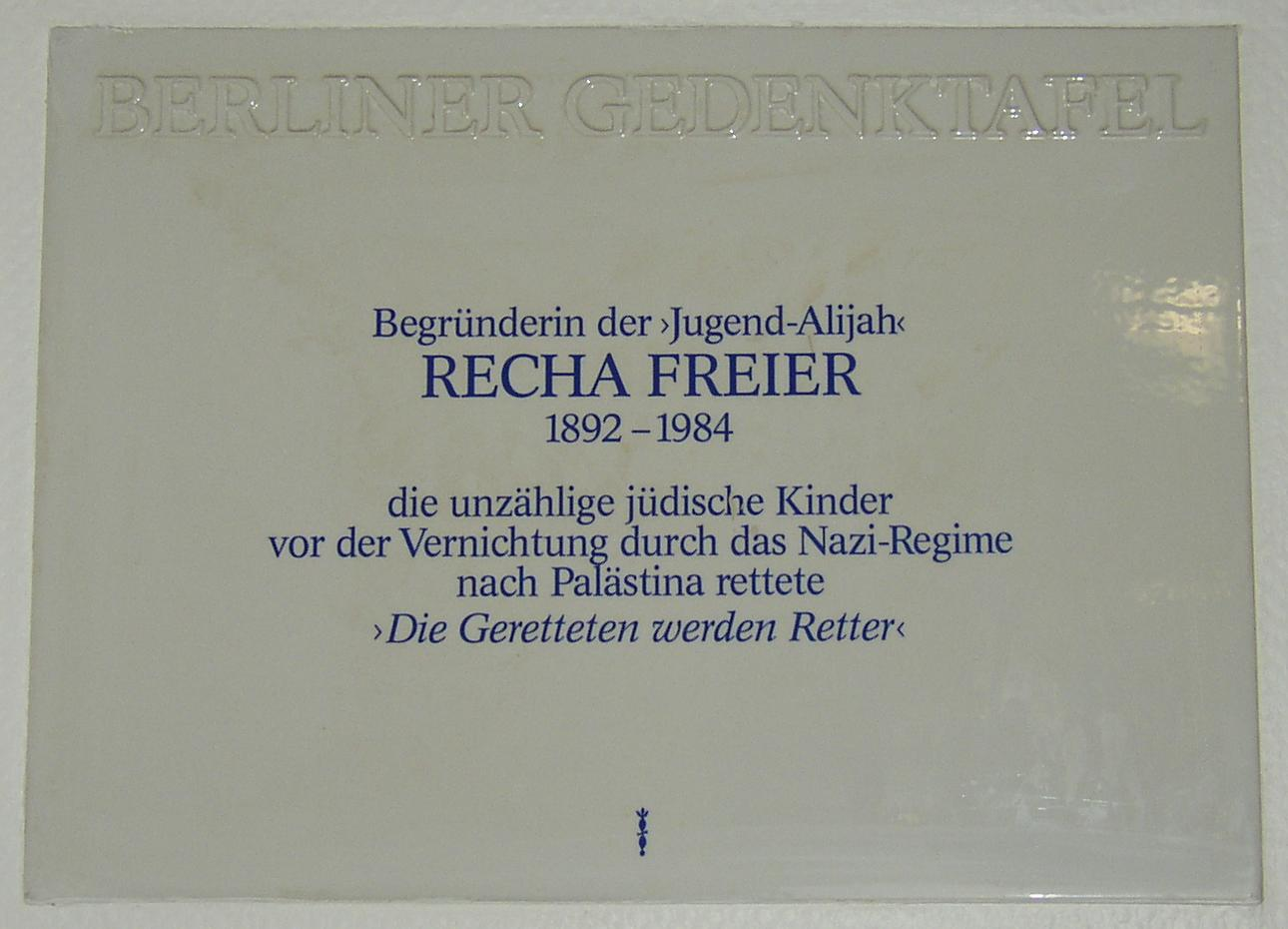
Memorial plaque for Recha Freier located in Berlin-Charlottenburg, Germany

Recha Freier (Hebrew: רחה פריאר) born Recha Schweitzer, (29 October 1892 – 2 April 1984) founded the Youth Aliyah organization in 1933. The organization saved the lives of 7,000 Jewish children by helping them to leave Nazi Germany for Mandatory Palestine before and during the Holocaust.

Recha Freier was also a poet, musician, teacher and social activist.

== Early life ==
Recha Schweitzer was born into a Jewish Orthodox family. Her parents were Bertha (née Levy, 1862–1945 in Theresienstadt), a French and English teacher, and Menashe Schweitzer (1856–1929), who taught several subjects at a Jewish primary school. She grew up in a music-loving family and learned to play the piano.

Already as a child Recha Schweitzer was confronted with antisemitism: a notice in Norden's city park stated that "Dogs and Jews are forbidden." In 1897 her family moved to Silesia, where she received home-schooling for a while before attending the lycée in Glogau (now Głogów), where she was mocked by her classmates because she wouldn't write on the Sabbath. Her reaction to the humiliation inflicted upon her had a lifelong impact on her and made her become a full-hearted Zionist.

Recha Schweitzer completed her gymnasial studies in Breslau, passed the exams for teachers of religion, and studied as a graduate student of philology in Breslau and Munich.

== Family life and career ==
In 1919 she married Rabbi Dr. Moritz "Moshe" Freier (1889–1969), with whom she moved to Eschwege, Sofia, and finally in 1925 to Berlin, where her husband worked as a rabbi. Their sons Shalhevet, Ammud and Zerem were born in 1920, 1923 and 1926 respectively, and their daughter Ma'ayan in 1929. During this time, in addition to her family obligations, Recha Freier worked as a teacher at a German high school in Sofia, and as a writer and folklorist.

== Youth Aliyah activities ==
In 1932, one year before the Nazi seizure of power, Recha Freier was asked by her husband to assist five Jewish teenage boys who were denied professional training and employment due to their Jewish background. After turning first to the Jewish Employment Agency, who could only counsel patience, she conceived the idea that the boys instead could be sent to Palestine, where they could be trained as farmers in the Jewish workers' settlements. By the end of 1932, the first group of youth left Berlin with the help of funds donated by Wilfrid Israel to Freier. This proved to be the beginning of the Youth Aliyah. "The utter senselessness of Jewish life in the Diaspora stood palpably before my eyes", she wrote. After that she strove incessantly to save the Jewish youth of Germany.

The difficulties which Recha Freier faced were immense. Jewish organizations and parents were skeptical about the plan to send children alone to a distant country. In January 1933, Recha Freier founded in Berlin the Committee for the Assistance of Jewish Youth or Youth Aliyah (Hilfskomitee für Jüdische Jugend), which was recognized by the World Zionist Congress but which at that stage received no financial support. Recha Freier contacted the labor movement in Palestine, as well as Henrietta Szold, the founder of Hadassah, who had at her disposal the support, financial and otherwise, of American Jewry. Freier asked Szold to take charge of the teenagers after their arrival in Palestine. Szold initially opposed the plan, finding it unfeasible, but eventually accepted the role offered to her by Freier and thus become the director of Youth Aliyah's Jerusalem office.

In 1938, Recha Freier worked alongside people such as Aaron Menschel, director of the Vienna Youth Aliyah office, in an endeavor to save Austrian Jews. In this year too, largely coinciding with the Kristallnacht pogrom, Jews in Germany of Polish Nationality, were arrested and sent to concentration camps. Freier endeavored to obtain the release of these Jews from the camps. This became possible by making use of permits issued by the Nazi authorities and given to the Jewish representative body—the Reich Association of Jews in Germany—for distribution to such Jews as could undertake to leave Germany within two weeks of receiving the permit. Freier took 100 such permits, without permission, and filled in the names of Jewish concentration camp prisoners. These prisoners were released and ultimately reached Palestine. When it became known that Freier had taken the permits without the knowledge of the officers of the Reich Association of Jews in Germany, Freier was informed that she was not allowed to take any more permits, and was ousted from the Zionist leadership in Berlin, including her position as the director of the Youth Aliyah offices.

Freier remained in Nazi Germany until the middle of 1940 and then crossed the border into Yugoslavia illegally with the help of professional smugglers. Even after entering Yugoslavia she continued her activities and managed to save 150 youths whose parents had already perished in concentration camps. After a sojourn of several months in Yugoslavia she continued to Palestine in 1941.

When Freier arrived in Jerusalem, Szold told Freier that there was no room for her in the running of the Youth Aliyah in Palestine. Thus Freier withdrew from her formal role within the Youth Aliyah. In 1943, Freier established the Agricultural Training Center for Israeli children whose aim it was to provide a proper education for children from impoverished families; children living in inferior social conditions. This she did by arranging for these children to be brought up in a Kibbutz, in workers’ settlements or in family units set up for this purpose.

Henrietta Szold is often wrongly credited as the founder of the Youth Aliyah. It was only after Henrietta Szold's death in 1945, when Moshe Kol was at the head of the Youth Aliyah organization (1947-1966), that Freier's achievements in establishing the organization and in saving thousands of German Jewish youth was recognized. This came about after Freier brought a lawsuit against Kol, alleging that her role in establishing the Youth Aliyah movement and in saving the lives of thousands of Jewish youth from Europe, was being purposely ignored.

By 1939, Youth Aliyah saved 7,000 youths, who made aliya to Palestine and were absorbed into worker's settlements.

== Music and opera ==
In 1958, Freier established the Israel Composer's Fund, and in 1966 she founded, together with the composer Roman Haubenstock-Ramati, the Festival "Testimonium" ("Witness"), designed to support the setting to music the stories of central events in the life of the Jewish people. For this purpose she managed to engage the help of notable composers, both Jewish and non-Jewish, such as Ben-Zion Orgad, Mauricio Kagel, Karlheinz Stockhausen, Iannis Xenakis, Lukas Foss and others. She also wrote a number of libretti for Israeli composers. These included Mark Kopytman (Chamber Scenes from the Life of Süsskind von Trimberg, written for the "Testimonium" series, 1982), Josef Tal (Amnon and Tamar, 1958, based on the Book of Samuel), and Yitzchak Sadai (Trail 19, 1982).

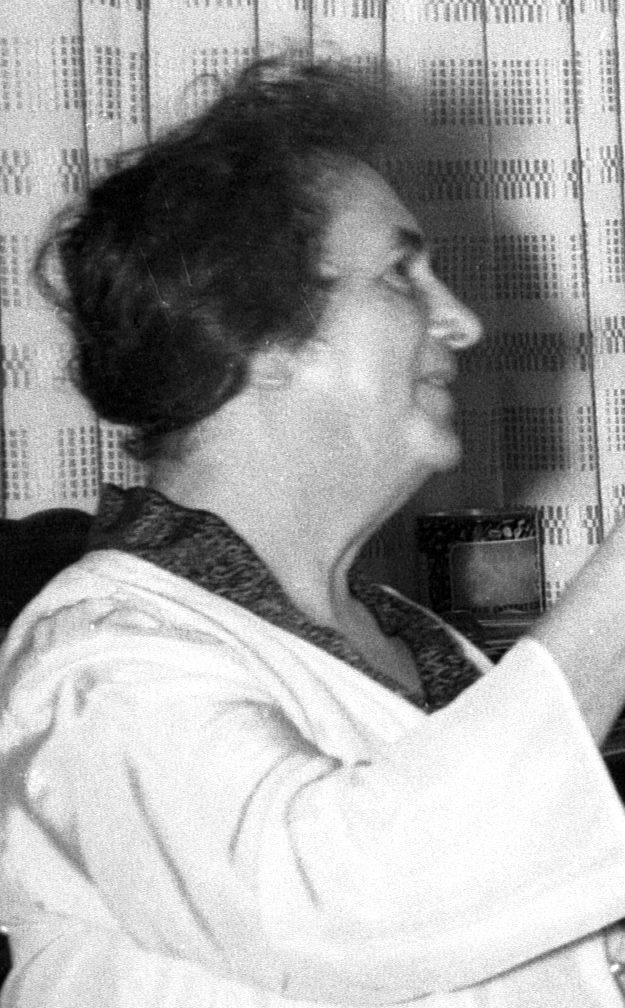
Recha Freier (c. 1964)

== Late recognition ==
Recha Freier, through her activities in the Youth Aliyah, saved over 7,000 young Jews who immigrated to Palestine and were absorbed into the Yishuv. Recognition first came in 1975, when the 83-year-old received an honorary doctorate from the Hebrew University of Jerusalem for her initial idea of "organized transport of youth into kibbutzim", and in 1981 she received the Israel Prize for her life's work, her outstanding contribution to the people and State of Israel, in the field of Social Welfare, Community and Youth.

== Death ==
Recha Freier died in 1984 in Jerusalem.

== Awards and commemoration ==
- 1975, an honorary doctorate from the Hebrew University of Jerusalem for the idea of "organized transport of youth into kibbutzim"
- 1981, the Israel Prize for special contribution to society and the State of Israel.
- 1984 (in November, posthumously), commemorative plaque affixed by the City Council of Berlin-Charlottenburg at the Jewish Community Center in honour of "Recha Freier, the Founder of Youth Aliya".
- 1990, the Recha Freier Educational Center at Kibbutz Yakum near Tel Aviv is founded in her honour.
- Kikar Recha Freier, a square in Jerusalem's Katamon neighborhood, is named after her.
- In 2018 an Israeli stamp was issued in her honor.

== Published works (selection) ==
- Arbeiterinnen erzählen (lit.: Stories told by female workers), Berlin, 1935
- Auf der Treppe (lit.: On the staircase), Hamburg, 1976
- Fensterläden (lit.: Window shutters), Hamburg, 1979
- Let the Children Come: The Early History of Youth Aliyah, London, 1961
- Testimonium, compilation of texts for the music events: I Jerusalem (1968); II The Middle Ages (1971); III De Profundis (1974); IV Lucem cum Fulgeret (If ever I saw the light shining, Job 31:26) (1976); V Trial 19 (Spanish Inquisition) (1979); VI From the Revealed and From the Hidden (1983).
- Libretto for Chamber Scenes from the Life of Süsskind von Trimberg by Mark Kopytman, chamber opera, 1982

== See also ==
- List of Israel Prize recipients
- Youth village
