= Josef Tal =

Israeli composer (1910–2008)

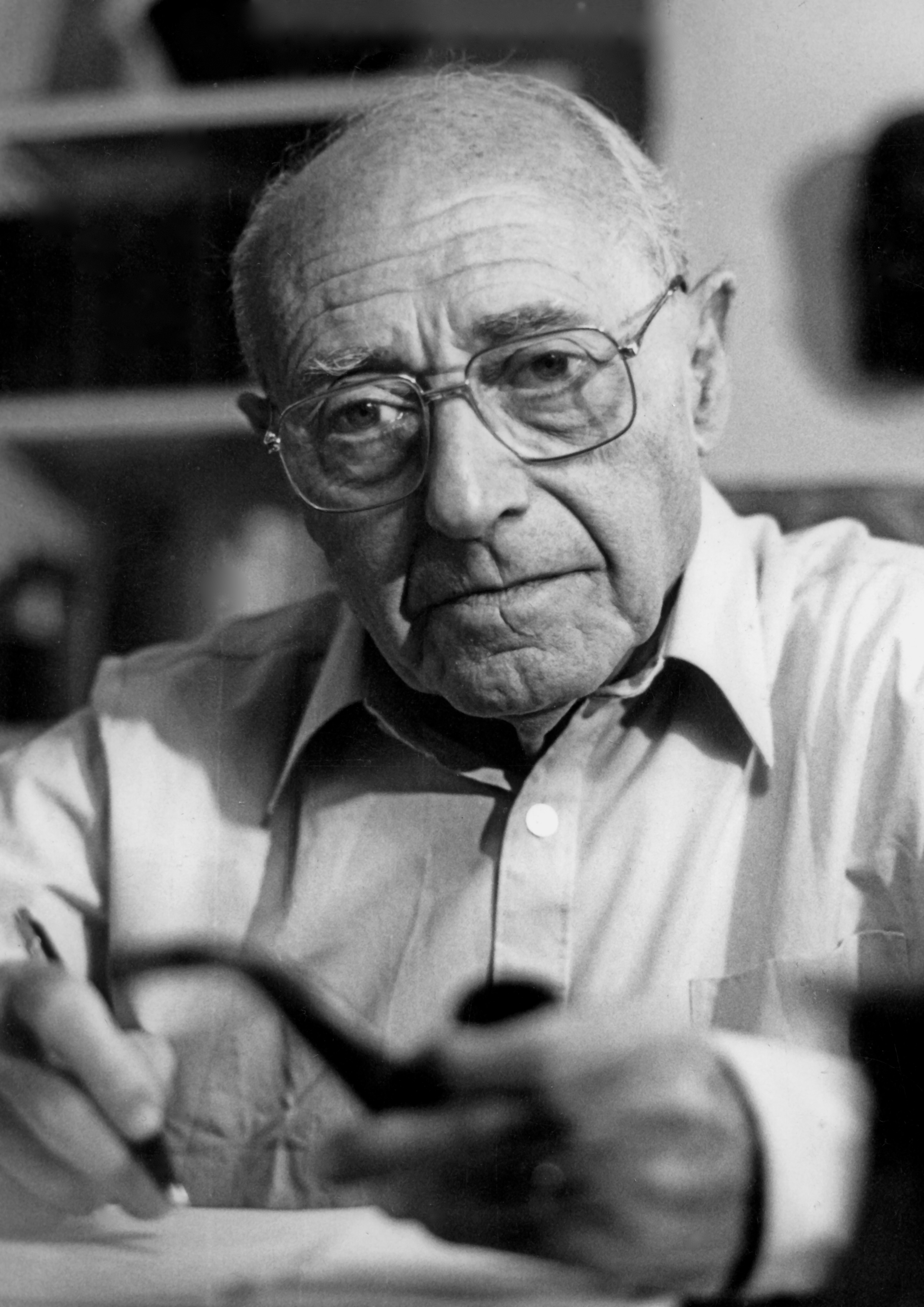
Josef Tal in 1987

Josef Tal (Hebrew: יוסף טל; September 18, 1910 – August 25, 2008) was an Israeli composer. He wrote three Hebrew operas; four German operas, dramatic scenes; six symphonies; 13 concerti; chamber music, including three string quartets; instrumental works; and electronic compositions. He is considered one of the founding fathers of Israeli art music.

== Biography ==
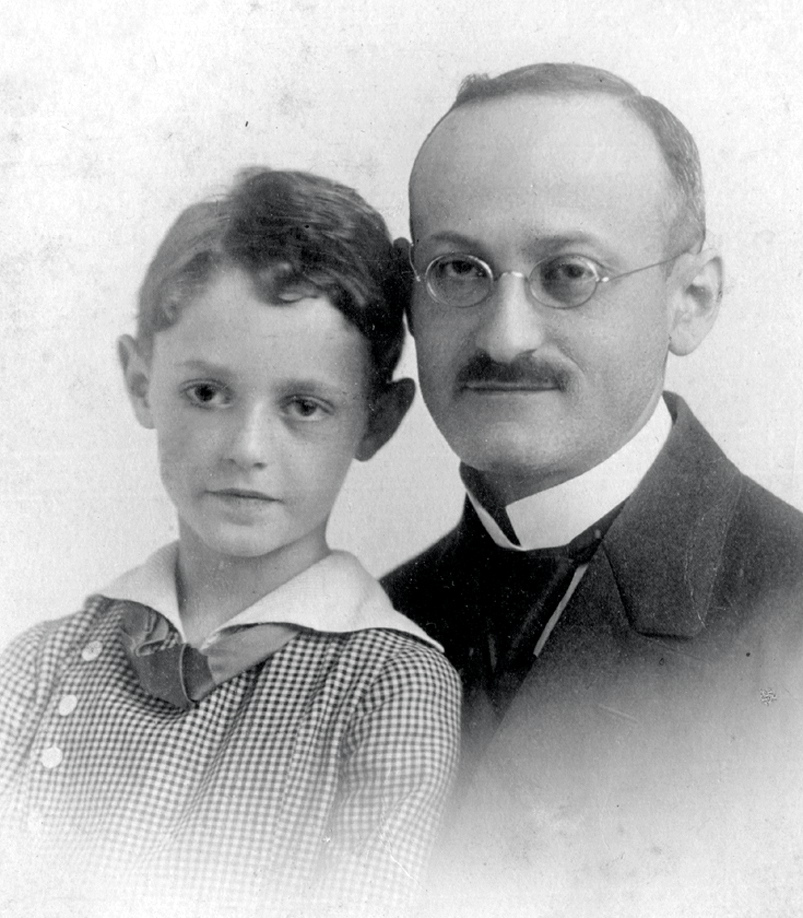
Josef Tal with his father Julius Grünthal, 1917

Josef Grünthal (later Josef Tal) was born in the town of Pinne (now Pniewy), near Poznań, German Empire (present-day Poland). Soon after his birth, his family (parents Ottilie and Rabbi Julius Grünthal, and his elder sister Grete), moved to Berlin, where the family managed a private orphanage. Rabbi Julius Grünthal was a docent in the Higher Institute for Jewish Studies (Hochschule für die Wissenschaft des Judentums), specializing in the philology of ancient languages.

Tal's first encounter with music was at the synagogue, where there was a choir and his grandfather served as a non-professional cantor. After attending his first concert, he began to take piano lessons. Tal was admitted to the Staatliche Akademische Hochschule für Musik in Berlin and studied with Max Trapp (piano and composition), Heinz Tiessen (theory), Max Saal (harp), Curt Sachs (instrumentation), Fritz Flemming (oboe), Georg Schünemann (history of music), Charlotte Pfeffer and Siegfried Borris (ear training), Siegfried Ochs (choir singing), Leonid Kreutzer (piano methodology), and Julius Prüwer (conducting). Paul Hindemith —his composition and theory teacher— introduced him to Friedrich Trautwein, who directed the electronic music studio in the building cellar. Tal completed his studies in the academy in 1931, and married dancer Rosie Löwenthal one year later. He worked giving piano lessons and accompanying dancers, singers, and silent movies.

Nazi anti-Jewish labour laws rendered Tal unemployed and he turned to studying photography with Schule Reimann with the intention of acquiring a profession that would make him eligible for an "immigration certificate" to Mandate Palestine.

In 1934, the family immigrated to Palestine with their young son Re'uven. Tal worked as a photographer in Haifa and Hadera for a short time. The family moved then to Kibbutz Beit Alpha and later to Kibbutz Gesher, where Tal intended to dedicate his time to his music. Finding it hard to adjust to the new social reality in the kibbutz, the family settled in Jerusalem where Tal established professional and social connections. He performed as a pianist, gave piano lessons and occasionally played harp with the newly founded Palestine Orchestra. In 1937, the couple divorced.

Tal accepted an invitation from Emil Hauser to teach piano, theory, and composition at the Palestine Conservatory, and in 1948 he was appointed director of the Jerusalem Academy of Music and Dance in Jerusalem, a post he held until 1952. In 1940 Tal married the sculptor Pola Pfeffer. Their son Etan Tal was born in 1948.

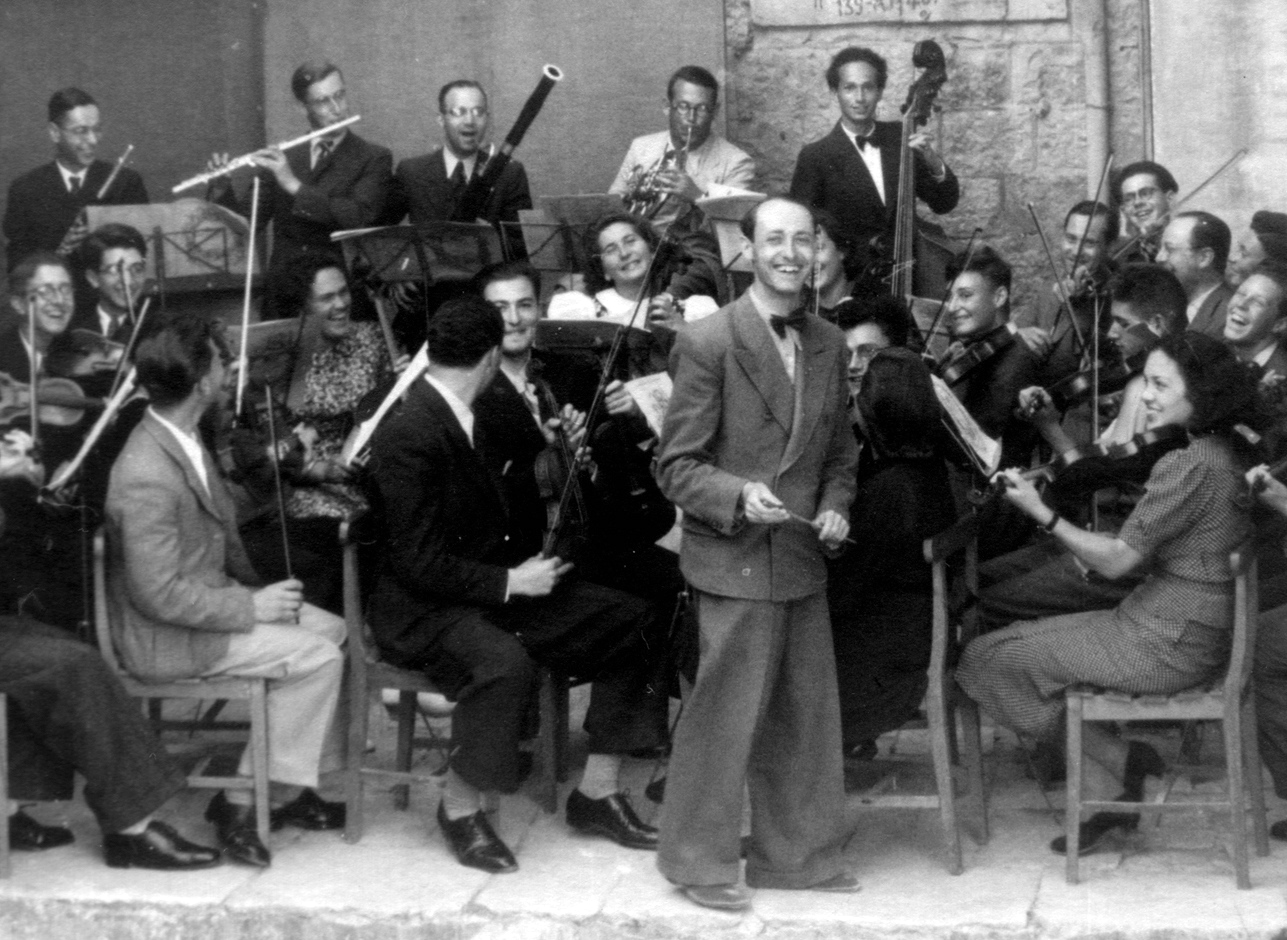
Tal with Palestine Conservatoire of Music Orchestra (1939)

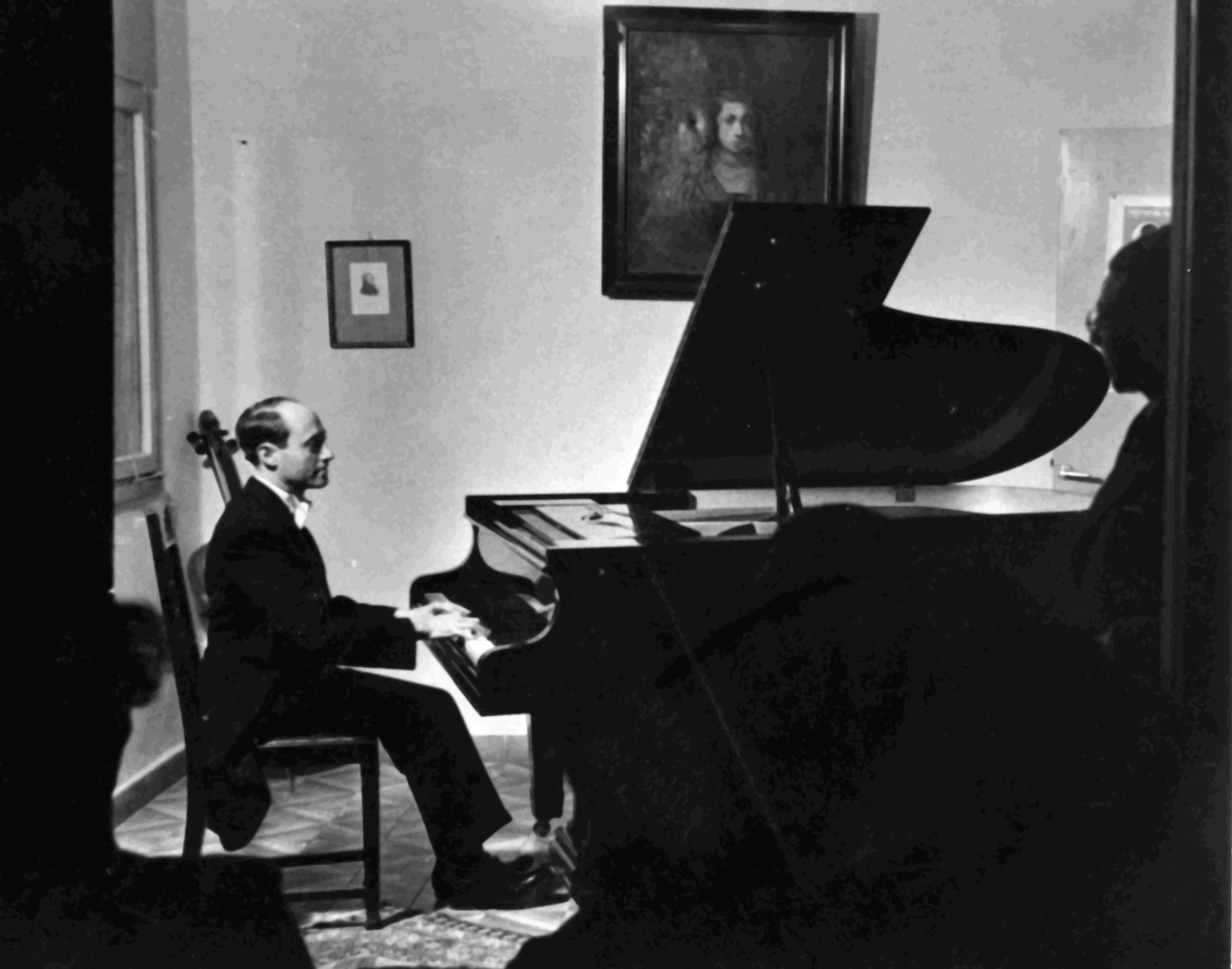
Tal piano recital at Tel Aviv Museum (May 8, 1944)

In 1951 Tal was appointed lecturer at the Hebrew University of Jerusalem and full professor in 1978. In 1961 he established the Centre for Electronic Music in Israel. He published academic articles, and wrote many music entries in the Encyclopaedia Hebraica. In 1965 he was appointed senior professor and later chairman of the Musicology Department at the Hebrew University, a post he held until 1971. Among his many pupils are the composers Ben-Zion Orgad, Robert Starer, Naomi Shemer, Jacob Gilboa, and Yehuda Sharett, conductor Eliahu Inbal, musicologist Michal Smoira-Cohn, cellist Uzi Wiesel, pianists Walter Hautzig, Bracha Eden, and Jonathan Zak, and soprano Hilde Zadek.

Tal represented Israel at the International Society for Contemporary Music (ISCM) conferences and in other musical events and attended many professional conferences around the world. He was a member of the Berlin Academy of the Arts (Akademie der Künste), and a fellow of the Institute for Advanced Study, Berlin (Wissenschaftskolleg zu Berlin).

Until his sixties Tal appeared as a pianist and conductor with various orchestras, but his major contribution to the music world lies in his challenging compositions and his novel use of sonority. In the 1990s Tal conducted, together with Dr Shlomo Markel, a research project (Talmark) aimed at the development of a novel musical notation system in cooperation with the Technion – Israel Institute of Technology, and Volkswagen Foundation. During these years his eyesight deteriorated due to macular degeneration and it became increasingly difficult for him to continue composing. Using a computer screen to enlarge the music score, he managed to compose short musical works for few instruments, write his third autobiography, and complete his visionary analysis of future music. The complete cycle of his symphonies conducted by Israel Yinon was released on the German label CPO.

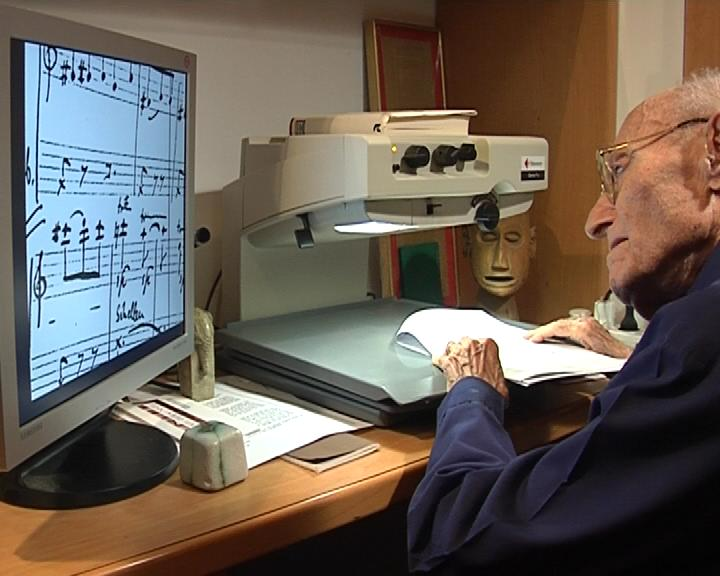
Tal checks a manuscript (2006)

Josef Tal died in Jerusalem. He is buried in Kibbutz Ma'ale HaHamisha, near Jerusalem. Part of his archival legacy is held in the National Library of Israel in Jerusalem. Many of Tal's works are published by the Israel Music Institute (IMI).

== Musical style ==
...There is no linear creative process. By its very nature it moves adventurously in many directions. There is the big danger that this may mislead one to superficiality. But just the same it is the great privilege of the creative man that all the roads are open before him. It is up to him, whether he loses his way in that universe or whether he explores it.

— From: "Self portrait of the composer Josef Tal – notes for a radio transmission" (date unknown)

The characteristic features of Tal's music are broad dramatic gestures and driving bursts of energy generated, by various types of ostinato or sustained textural accumulations. Complex rhythmic patterning is typical of the widely performed Second Symphony and of a number of notable dance scores. But Tal's marked dramatic and philosophical propensities find total expression only in opera, particularly in the large-scale, 12-note opera Ashmedai...

Tal's early compositional style was a point of some controversy, due to his departure from – and criticism of – the so-called 'Mediterranean school' favoured by many Israeli composers at the time. This was an approach pioneered by Paul Ben-Haim and other composers, who set traditional Middle Eastern Jewish melodies within a European, often Impressionist, harmonic vocabulary. He was the most distinctive among the first generation of composers who principally opposed the use of folklorism and orientalism.

...From the moment of my arrival in Palestine, in 1934, I was considered to be an enfant terrible. I thought that it was a mistake to harmonize a Yemenite melody according to European songs.

— Josef Tal

On the one hand, like other members of the pioneer generation of composers who emigrated to Palestine in the 1930s, Tal sought to create a new national style distinct from European (and particularly German) modernism. On the other hand, to distance himself from Ben-Haim's "Mediterranean" school he adopted a distinctly modernist style, and insisted instead that Israeli music should be judged according to its affinity with concurrent development in European music.

Tal's music is not monolithic. Despite its dominant atonality, Tal's music has undergone changes and modifications over the years. These changes reflect what occurred over time in Israeli music. Most of the works which Tal wrote around 1950 are characterized by traditional components and frameworks, written in traditional techniques such as variations, and atonal musical language. In the late 'forties and early 'fifties, when the Mediterranean style was at its peak, Tal was a frequent borrower of Oriental-Jewish source material as the basis for his compositions. If we take Ben-Zion Orgad's definition as the most pertinent it would surely follow that Tal's Piano Sonata, 1st symphony, 2nd Piano Concerto and other works based on Oriental-Jewish melodies are definitely not Mediterranean.

Reflections (1950) is neither tonal nor serial, and inhabits a world not unlike Bartok of the third and fourth string quartets, tempered somewhat by a decidedly Stravinskian acidity, along with a Hindemithian contrapuntal propensity. This, however, should not be taken literally. Cast in three movements, and having a performance time of approximately fifteen minutes, its procedures relate it more to the general neo-classic aesthetic of the late 1930s and 1940s. The use of solo strings played off against the ripieni of the string body points to the Baroque concerto grosso. As if to trump its neo-classical models, the final movement is a "fugue" in which Tal obliquely pays his respects to Hindemith without reverting explicitly to Hindemith's vocabulary.

...After the War [World War II], again, I had to learn a new musical language, the serial technique, which became dominant in the 1950s in Europe. Other styles followed that one. Every fifteen years I learned, and composed in, a new musical style, and all of them interested me. This variety is [the story of] the 20th century, and it could have happened only to one who lived through the whole century, someone stubborn like me.

— Josef Tal

Tal's numerous works for traditional media defy classification as part of any "school". No doubt Schoenberg had an early influence on the Berlin composition student. But neither his widely played First Symphony (1952) nor his exceedingly well-wrought String Quartet in one movement, nor, for that matter, his subsequent Cello Concerto is in any structural sense dodecaphonically conceived. While row materials are freely used, the method of composing with twelve tones is nowhere strictly applied, not even in as recent and completely atonal a piece as the Structure for solo harp. Similarly, oriental materials are employed sparingly and with the greatest caution. Whereas the Symphony is actually based on a Persian-Jewish lament as notated by A. Z. Idelsohn, the Quartet no longer goes beyond the use of a few characteristic motifs. And if the Symphony still features a dance section in accordance with the then prevailing tenets of the Mediterranean School, such sacrifices to popular taste, however subtle, have been conspicuously missing in recent years.

A comprehensive examination of Tal's work suggests the following analysis:

(A) First period (works written up to 1959): These have a three-part structure; the micro-structural idea is based on the relationship between notes; the beat and the melodic line occupy an important place among the musical components.

(B) Second period (1959–1967): Characterized by the use of dodecaphonic technique.

(C) Third period (from 1967 on): Characterized by all (instrumental) works being written in one condensed movement. The single note, with its potential implications, is the micro-structural idea. Time, the sound in its various aspects, the rhythmic figure, the color and the texture are the dominant components... The influence of electronic music is in evidence. Transition from one period to the next is gradual, the language in all of them being atonal and the compositions developing from one basic idea.

(D) All Tal's works contain a recapitulation, which he terms "closing the cycle"... Tal sees his compositions as a metaphor for geometric circle, a perfect form, the life cycle. Life begins with the note C (doh) – a "center of gravity"... Tal employs innovative instrumental and orchestral techniques while retaining a predisposition for tradition, especially the Baroque... He divides the orchestra into sound and color group, sometimes also attaching a special texture to each group. This technique is personal and could be called "a special language". The whole orchestra is used sparingly, only at strategic points...

...Undoubtedly one can find a wealth of musical motifs in Israeli folklore, but it is the courageous composer that absorbs it for an extra-national goal, to create a universal artwork. A work related to temporal phenomena and values is bound to dilettantism. It will lack the origin of every artwork, which, similarly to nature, is super-natural and eternal.

— Josef Tal

...Israeli music is not the outcome of tonality or modality, of atonality or dodecaphony, nor of serial technique or electronics. These are nothing more than the means to which the folkloristic quotation, the combination of Mediterranean fifths, the a la hora rhythm, also belong. The means itself is good as long as it serves a living content and a vital will. In every living language the dialect must necessarily undergo changes: so in music too.

— Josef Tal

...As a born creator, Tal has thus enjoyed the inestimable advantage of isolation (for which, to pose an extreme case, Beethoven had to pay with his hearing); notwithstanding his straightforward, elemental love for the Jewish national home, he was too inventive a musician to be caught up in nationalist movements or submit to such Judaic or Jewish pressures... While the European composer, and especially the avant-gardist, has tended to worry about trends, unconfessed fashions... Tal has been evolving his natural post-tonal style in total detachment from Europe's and indeed America's much-publicized secret societies... The result has been a supra-factional as well as supra-national output which immediately attracts musical listeners who have not themselves been deafened by their theoretical and/or national allegiances...

— Hans Keller

=== Composer–listener relationship ===
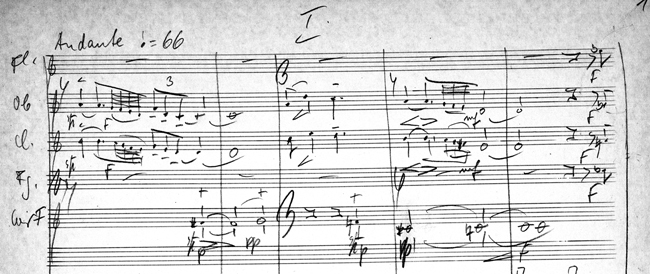
First lines of Piano Concerto No. 2 (1953)

Tal did not underestimate the importance of relationship between composer and listener, and was aware of the difficulties posed by "modern music":

...Theoretically, if you had played to people of the third century the Ninth Symphony of Beethoven, possibly they would have listened only to some white noise – because they were not educated to understand or analyse such a lot of different acoustical appearances...

— Josef Tal

Tal's attitude towards his music and his audience was inspired by the uncompromising approach[es] of Beethoven and Arnold Schoenberg, two composers whom Tal particularly admired. He places high demands upon his listeners: his works are intense, dissonant and densely eventful, and cannot be fully comprehended in one hearing...

— Jehoash Hirshberg

...I hesitate to provide the listener with a verbal analysis that explains a musical theoretical system using professional terminologies. This domain belongs to the composer's workshop and should not bother the listener. The listener brings his own musical experience to the concert, which was gained through lengthy exposure to classical and romantic music. This experience results in habits that help him navigate in classical music. The 20th century music listener is subject to a different system. Musical language changes constantly thus altering its aesthetic perception. Musical elements such as melody, harmony and rhythm are now manifested differently from the traditional music. Despite these changes, a phenomenon common to all musical eras shows itself constantly: the suggestive power that flows from the musical piece to the listener...

— Tal's foreword to 4th Symphony premiere (1987)

== Electronic music ==
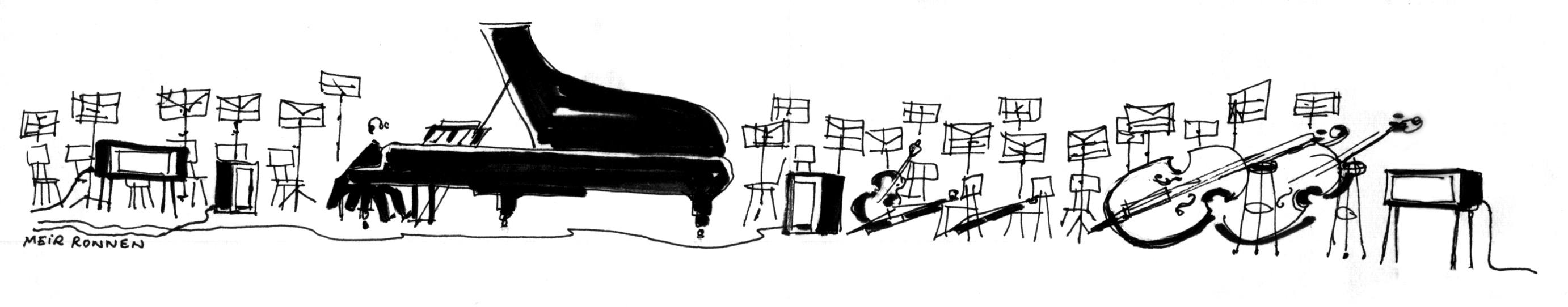
A caricature by Meir Ronnen following the premiere of Tal's Concerto No. 4 for Piano & Electronics.

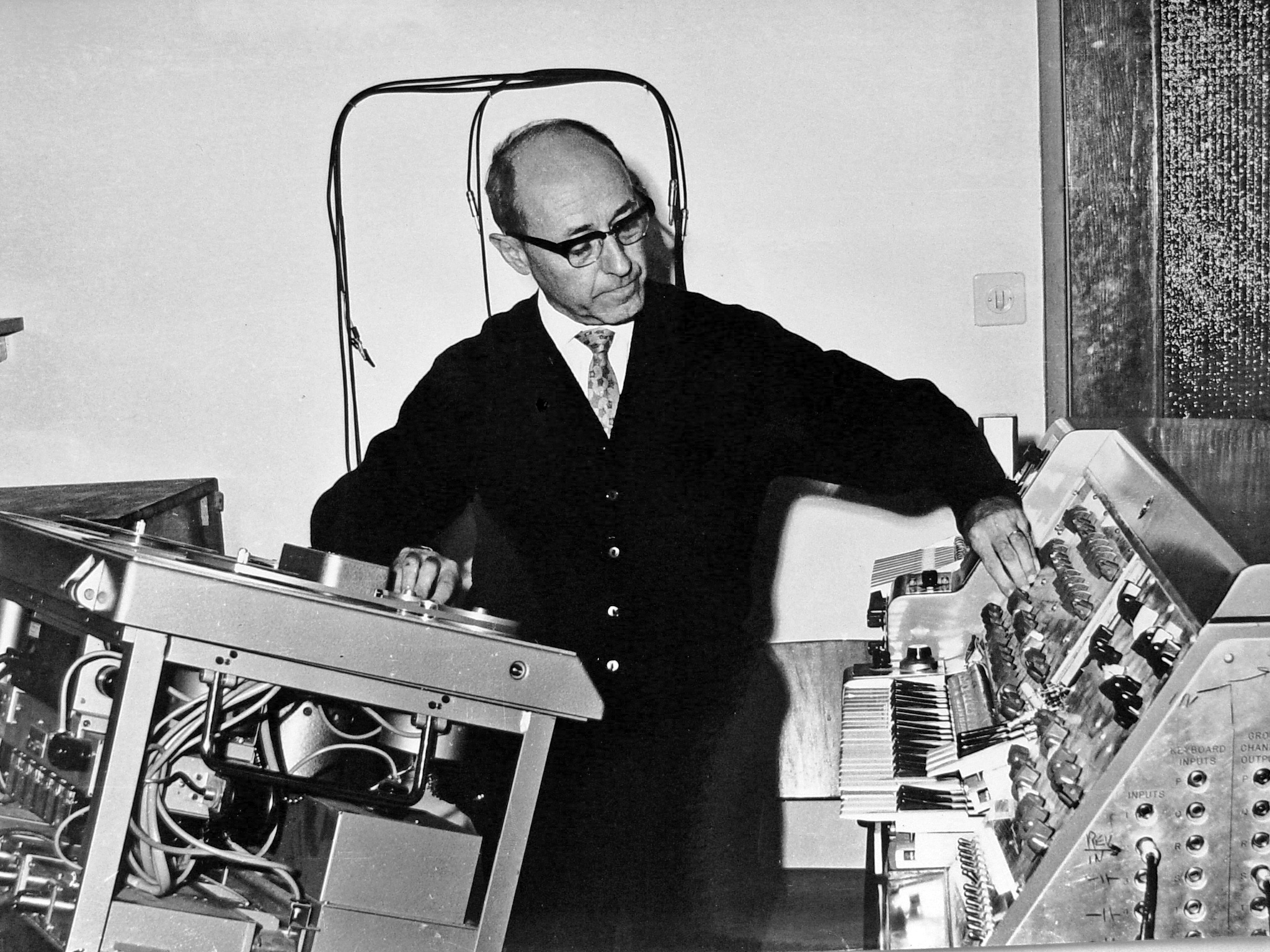
Tal at the Electronic Music Studio (1965)

The founding figure of the field in Israel, Josef Tal, was first exposed to electronic music in the late 1920s in Germany. The founding of the Israel Center for Electronic Music was the result of a six-month UNESCO research fellowship on which Tal toured major international electronic music studios, in 1958. It was a meeting with Milton Babbitt at The Columbia-Princeton Electronic Music Center that pointed Josef Tal to the technology he needed to found the first electronic music studio in Israel. He learned from Vladimir Ussachevsky, about a new invention by Canadian inventor Hugh Le Caine, called the Multi-track. First built in 1955, this device could replay six independent magnetic tapes, with the speed and direction of each tape separately controllable. Le Caine's idea was to design an instrument to facilitate composition in the Parisian musique concrète tradition of Pierre Schaeffer. Following a successful fund-raising by Shalheveth Freier the Multi-track which was built for Tal's studio was completed and delivered to Jerusalem in 1961. It required a trip by Le Caine to set it up correctly.

Tal produced some of the earlier examples of electrico-acoustical music, and in this is joined by such as Edgard Varèse, Mario Davidovsky, and Luciano Berio.

As might be expected from a man of his candor, Tal is completely undoctrinaire about electronic music and broaches its problems with the same healthy skepticism that has marked his approach to the twelve-tone method or the issue of a "national" Israeli style. Thus, he declared:

We can make a religion of the purity of the sine-tone, we can use white noise as a counterpart, but we cannot shut our ears to the fact that compared with conventional tone material, as the bearer of sound content, electronic tone material is inherently narrower and more rigid; indeed it has the characteristics of the synthetic...

Imbued with a realism that accompanies his idealism, Tal occupies a distinctive position within a field marked by diverse artistic approaches. Combining personal modesty with a strong sense of artistic purpose, he has earned recognition even among listeners who find his music challenging. His work has had a notable influence on younger generations, while some of his more commercially successful contemporaries have reached broader audiences through forms of "Mediterranean" orientalism.

Tal was a strong believer in the value of electronic instruments and their potential to transcend the limitations of acoustical means of sound production. Tal regarded electronic music as a new music language, which he describes as unstable and lacking a crystallized definition. He viewed the computer as an instrument which compels the composer to disciplined thinking. In return, it stores the data it was fed with absolute faithfulness. Nevertheless, when the computer is ill-used, the composer's incompetence will be revealed, as he is unable to unite computer with the realm of music. But according to Tal, composing electronic music has another aspect too: when the composer chooses the computer's music-notation as his tool for creating, he concomitantly annuls the performer's role as an interpreter. From that point on, it is only the composer's mental capacity that counts, and the performance is independent of the interpreter's virtuosity.

Tal integrated electronic music in many of his works for "conventional" instruments, and was actually one of the world's pioneers in doing so. His pieces for electronic music and harp, piano or harpsichord, and operas like Massada or Ashmedai are typical examples. Following Concerto No. 4 for Piano & Electronics premiere (August 27, 1962), Herzl Rosenblum the daily Yedioth Ahronoth's editor and critic, used the terms "Terror!", "Cacophony" and "Minority dictatorship".

[...Despite] Tal's considerable interest in electronic music, and the time and creativity he devoted to it, he composed very few electronic works, and these were not played very often – partly because the composer himself did not particularly encourage their public presentation... Apparently, Tal could not quite adapt himself to the situation [] of sitting in a hall facing a set of two or four loudspeakers, and listening to the sounds emanating from them with no human performer in sight... Tal's compositional involvement with electronic music therefore largely consisted of combining live performance with electronic sound

— Jehoash Hirshberg

Tal taught electronic music and composed, for nearly two decades. Upon his retirement in 1980, Menachem Zur became director and remained in this role until the University closed the studio, for a variety of reasons, in the 1990s.

== Published works ==
=== Autobiographies ===
- Der Sohn des Rabbiners. Ein Weg von Berlin nach Jerusalem (The Son of the Rabbi: A Way from Berlin to Jerusalem). An autobiography, 1985, ISBN 3-88679-123-8.
- Reminiscences, Reflections, Summaries, retold in Hebrew by Ada Brodsky, published by Carmel (1997), ISBN 965-407-162-2.
- Tonspur – Auf der Suche nach dem Klang des Lebens (On Search for the Sound of Life), an autobiography, Henschel Publishing House Berlin 2005, ISBN 3-89487-503-8.

=== Essays ===
- article in "The Modern Composer and His World", report from the International Conference of Composers, held at the Stratford Festival (1960), eds. Beckwith & Kasemets, University of Toronto Press, 1961, pp. 116–121
- "National and Contemporary Trends in Israeli Music". Bat Kol, Israel Music 1, pp 6–7 (1961)
- "Rationale und Sensitive Komponenten des 'Verstehens'", in Musik und Verstehen – Aufsätze zur semiotischen Theorie, Ästhetik und Soziologie der musikalischen Rezeption, Arno Volk Verlag (1973), 306–313.
- "Music, Hieroglyphics and Technical Lingo in The World of Music", Vol. XIII, No.1/1971 B. Schott's Söhne, Mainz, 18–28.
- "Gedanken zur Oper Ashmedai", in Ariel – Berichte zur Kunst und Bildung in Israel, No. 15 (1972), 89–91.
- "The Contemporary Opera", in Ariel (30), Spring 1972, pp. 93–95
- "Historical Text and Pretext in the Works of an Israeli Composer", in Fontes Artis Musicae, vol. XXII, 1975/1–2 pp. 43–47 (with Israel Eliraz)
- "Der Weg einer Oper", Wissenschftskolleg Jahrbuch 1982/83, Siedler Verlag, 355–356.
- "Wagner und die Folgen in der Musik des 20. Jahrhunderts", in: Wort und Musik (3) pp. 26–43, Verlag Ursula Müller-Speiser (1990)
- The Impact of the Era on the Interrelation Between Composer, Performer and Listener. Music in Time – A Publication of the Jerusalem Rubin Academy of Music and Dance (1983–1984), pp. 23–27.
- "Musik auf Wanderung – Querschnitte zwischen Gestern und Morgen" in Berliner Lektionen, (1992) Bertelsmann, 79–90.
- "Ein Mensch-zu-Mensch-Erlebnis im Wissenschaftskolleg Berlin" (1994) in Axel von dem Bussche, Hase & Koehler Verlag, 125–131. ISBN 3-7758-1311-X.
- Musica Nova in the Third Millennium, Israel Music Institute, 2002, ISBN 965-90565-0-8

=== Photography ===
Tal made a living as a professional photographer for a short period after immigrating to Palestine (1934–1935). He continued to develop films and enlargements as a hobby in makeshift home darkroom for many years afterwards.

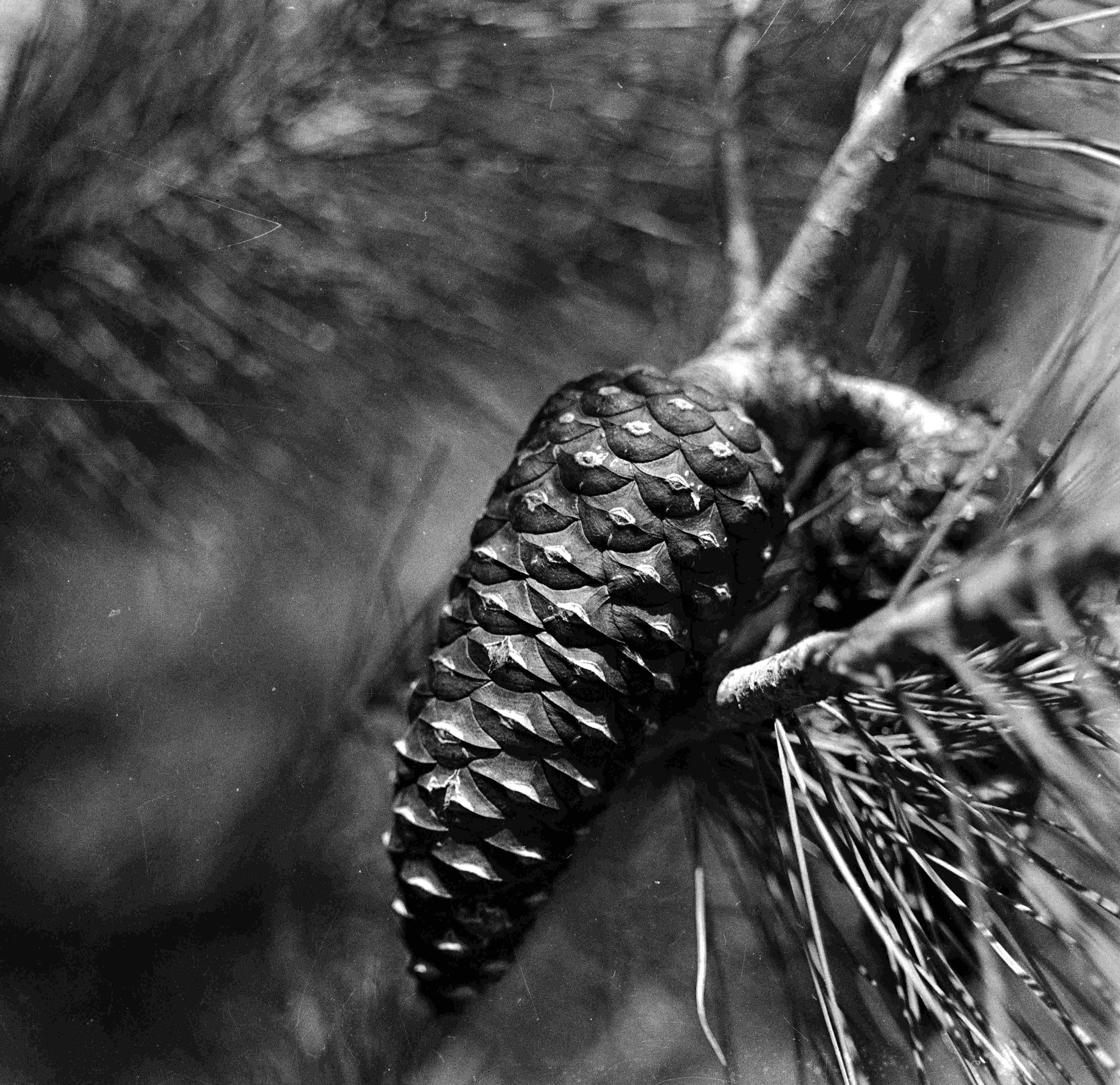
A pine cone (1939)

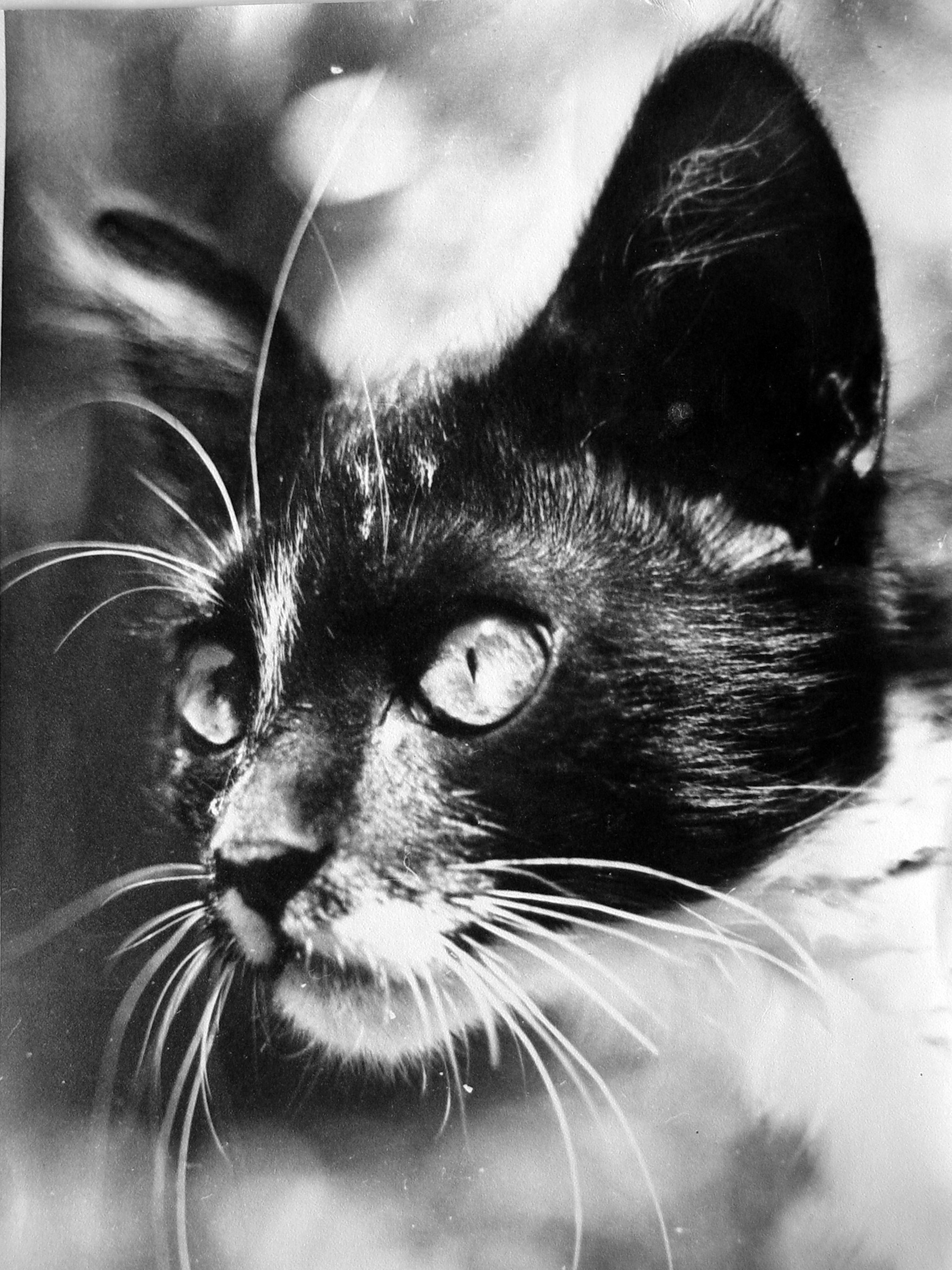
Mungo (1939)

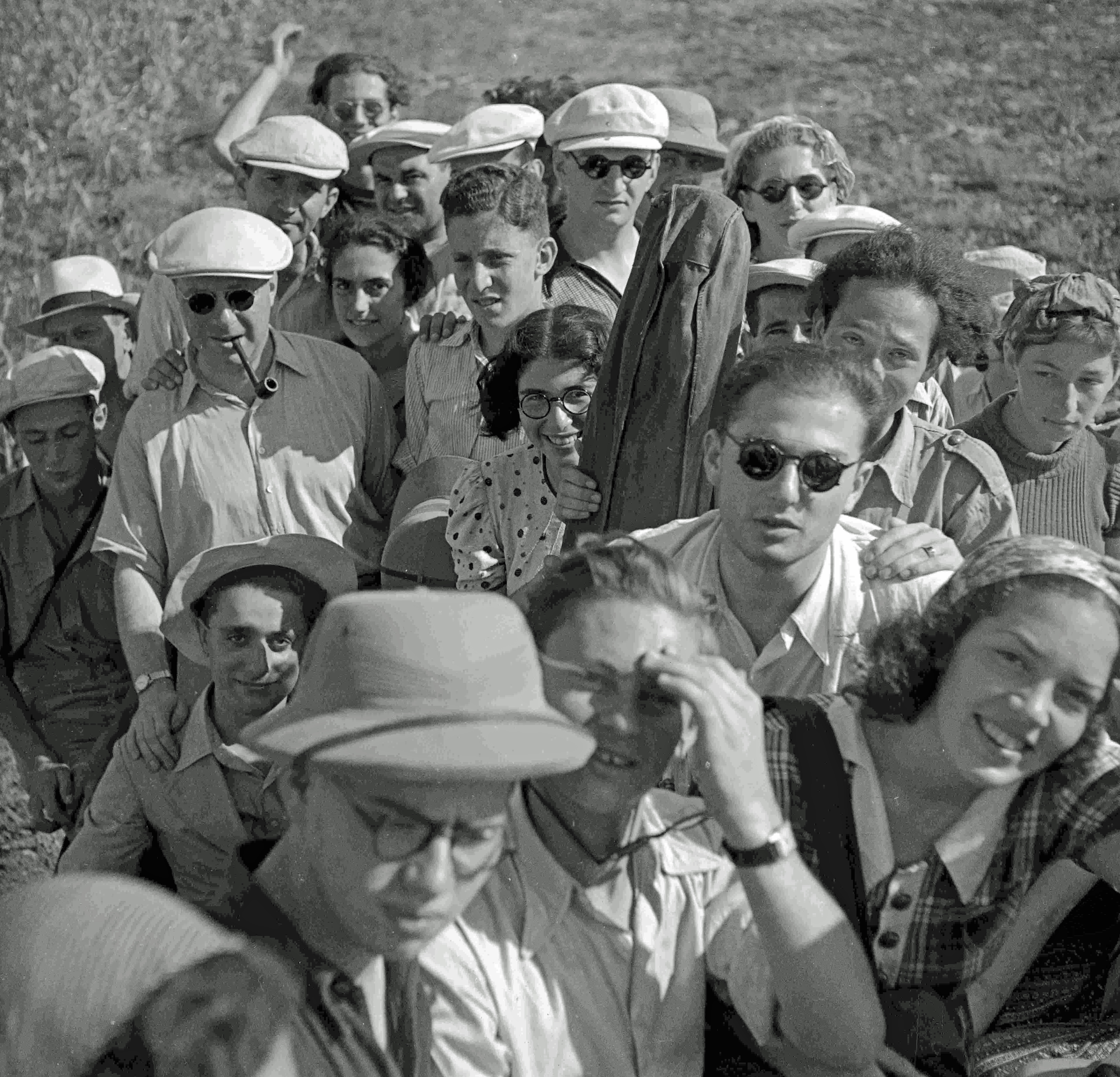
Members of the Palestine Conservatoire of Music Orchestra in a concert tour (Jezreel Valley, 1939)

== Awards and prizes ==
- 1949, 1958, 1977 – The City of Tel Aviv Engel Prize
- 1957/1958 – UNESCO grant for the study of electronic music
- 1969 – Member of the Academy of Arts, Berlin, Germany
- 1970 – The Israel Prize, for music
- 1975 – Berliner Kunstpreis (Art Prize of the City of Berlin)
- 1981 – Foreign Honorary Membership of the American Academy and Institute of Arts and Letters "in recognition of creative achievement in the arts"
- 1982/1983 – Fellow, Wissenschaftskolleg zu Berlin (Institute for Advanced Study, Berlin)
- 1982 – Wolf Prize in Arts (Israel), "for his novel approach to musical structure and texture and the unfailing dramatic tension of his creations"
- 1985 – (German) Bundesverdienstkreuz I Klasse de:Verdienstorden der Bundesrepublik Deutschland
- 1985 – (French) Commandeur de l'Ordre des Arts et des Lettres
- 1993 – Doctor Philosophiae Honoris Causa of Tel Aviv University "In special recognition of his unique operatic works which are evidence of his deep connection with the spirit of Judaism during various periods of history, and his achieving a synthesis between ancient Jewish tradition, and modern-day music"
- 1995 – Johann-Wenzel-Stamitz-Förderungspreis der Künstlergilde (Germany)
- 1995 – ACUM Prize
- 1995 – Yakir Yerushalayim award (given by the City of Jerusalem)
- 1996 – Doctor Philosophiae Honoris Causa of Hochschule für Musik und Theater Hamburg
- 1998 – Doctor Philosophiae Honoris Causa of The Hebrew University of Jerusalem "In tribute to his rich musical legacy and in recognition of his contribution to the development of music education in Israel"

== See also ==
- List of Israel Prize recipients
- List of compositions by Josef Tal

== Bibliography ==
- Brod, Max: Die Musik Israels. Bärenreiter (1976) ISBN 3-7618-0513-6, pp. 129–132
- Burns, Jeffrey: "Aus einem Gespräch mit Josef Tal". Zeitschrift für Musikpädagogik, no. 41, September 1987 pp. 3–9
- Burns, Jeffrey: "With Josef Tal on Kurfürsterdamm", in IMI News, 2001/1, pp. 17–20 ISSN 0792-6413
- Espiedra, Aviva: "Josef Tal, Sonata for Piano", in: A critical study of four piano sonatas by Israeli composers, 1950–1979, Doctor of Musical Arts dissertation in Peabody Institute of the Johns Hopkins University, 1992 pp. 15–78
- Flender, Reinhard D.: "Auf der Suche nach einer kulturellen Heimat. Stefan Wolpe und Josef Tal – Zwei Deutsch-Jüdische Komponisten aus Berlin". Neue Zeitschrift für Musik 1998, no. 3
- Hirshberg, Jehoash: "Joseph Tal's Homage to Else", in Ariel – A Quarterly Review of Arts and Letters in Israel, no. 41 (1976), pp. 83–93
- Keller, Hans: The Jerusalem Diary. Music, Society and Politics, 1977 and 1979. Plumbago Books ISBN 0-9540123-0-5
- Keller, Hans: "The Musician as Librettist", Opera XXXV (1984) pp. 1095–1099
- Markel, Shlomo: On Notation for Electro Acoustic Music and Interactive Environment for Composition, research thesis Submitted in partial fulfillment of the requirements for the degree of Doctor of Science, Technion, Haifa (1993)
- Seter, Ronit: Yuvalim be-Israel: Nationalism in Jewish-Israeli Art Music, 1940–2000, PhD dissertation, Cornell University, 2004, 553 pp. (on Tal, pp. 145–152).
- Seter, Ronit: "Israelism: Nationalism, Orientalism, and the Israeli Five". Musical Quarterly 97:2, 238-308 (esp. "Josef Tal, Israel's Progenitor of Electronic Music", pp. 278–288)
- Shelleg, Assaf: "The Dilution of National Onomatopoeias in Post-Statehood Israeli Art Music: Precursors, Contiguities, Shifts." Journal of Musicological Research 32:4, 314–345, (2013)
- Shelleg, Assaf: Jewish Contiguities and the Soundtrack of Israeli History, Oxford University Press (November 12, 2014)
- Tischler, Alice: A Descriptive Bibliography of Art Music by Israeli Composers. Warren, Michigan: Harmonie Park Press (1988)
