= Kazuhiro Koizumi =

Japanese conductor (born 1949)

- Born: October 16, 1949; Japan Kyoto
- Other name: 小泉 和裕
- Occupation: conductor

Kazuhiro Koizumi (小泉 和裕, Koizumi Kazuhiro; born 16 October 1949) is a Japanese conductor who has had an active international career since the 1970s. Koizumi was one among the founding conductors of the New Japan Philharmonic established in July 1972. He has appeared as a guest conductor throughout Europe and the United States, appearing with such ensembles as the Berlin Philharmonic and the Chicago Symphony Orchestra. He is the current principal conductor of both the Tokyo Metropolitan Symphony Orchestra, a post he has held since 2008, and the Century Orchestra Osaka (2003). Since 2006 he has been a current principal guest conductor with the Sendai Philharmonic Orchestra.

== Biography ==
Born in Kyoto, Koizumi is a graduate of the Tokyo University of the Arts and the Berlin University of the Arts. In 1973, he was awarded first prize at the Herbert von Karajan International Conducting Competition in Berlin. From 1983–1988 he was music director of the Winnipeg Symphony Orchestra. He then served as the music director of the New Japan Philharmonic for many years.
