= Hiroshi Wakasugi =

Japanese conductor (1935–2009)

Hiroshi Wakasugi 若杉弘
- Born: 31 May 1935; Tokyo, Tokyo Prefecture, Empire of Japan
- Died: 21 July 2009 (aged 74) Tokyo, Japan
- Occupation: Conductor
- Years active: mid 1950s–2009

Hiroshi Wakasugi (若杉 弘, Wakasugi Hiroshi; 31 May 1935 – 21 July 2009) was a Japanese orchestra conductor. He premiered many of the major Western operas in Japan, and was honoured with many awards for cultural achievement. He was best known for conducting works by German composers such as Richard Wagner, Anton Bruckner, Gustav Mahler, and Richard Strauss.

== Biography ==
Wakasugi was born in Tokyo. His father, Wakasugi Kaname, served as the Japanese Consul-General in New York City, assisting Ambassador Kichisaburo Nomura. In his teenage years Wakasugi worked as a répétiteur for the Tokyo Nikikai. Nevertheless, he attended the Faculty of Economics at Keio University, but soon dropped out to study music with Hideo Saito and Nobori Kaneko at the Tokyo University of the Arts. After graduation he was appointed researching conductor of the NHK Symphony Orchestra. From 1965 he led and developed the Yomiuri Nippon Symphony Orchestra, now one of the leading orchestras in Japan. For leading the Japanese premiere of Penderecki's St. Luke Passion, Wakasugi was awarded the National Arts Festival Prize by the Agency for Cultural Affairs in 1968. He established the Tokyo Chamber Opera Theatre in 1969 and remained its artistic director for the rest of his life.

Besides leading many international orchestras, Wakasugi was principal conductor of the Cologne Radio Symphony Orchestra from 1977 to 1983, and general music director of the Deutsche Oper am Rhein, Düsseldorf from 1981 to 1986. He was artistic director and principal conductor of the Tonhalle-Orchester Zürich in Switzerland from 1987 to 1991. From 1982 to 1991, he was also a permanent conductor at the Semperoper Dresden and Sächsische Staatskapelle Dresden. Wakasugi was chosen to be the former's next music director, but the reunification of Germany and the unraveling of the East German theatre system derailed this appointment.

He was music director (1986–1995) and principal conductor (1987–1995) of the Tokyo Metropolitan Symphony Orchestra. In spring 1995 he was appointed a permanent conductor of the NHK Symphony Orchestra.

In 2005 he was first named artistic consultant to the opera division of the New National Theatre Tokyo, then two years later its artistic director in September 2007. During his tenure there he led the Japanese premiere of Bernd Alois Zimmermann's Die Soldaten a few months before his death. In his final years he was also the artistic director of Biwako Opera Theatre.

Aside from performing, Wakasugi also held a professorship at Tokyo National University of the Arts and Toho Gakuen School of Music. He was a member of the Japan Art Academy.

Wakasugi was a recipient of the 1986 Suntory Music Award.

He died in Tokyo on 21 July 2009 from multiple organ failure.

Cultural offices
Preceded by Zdeněk Mácal	Principal Conductors, WDR Symphony Orchestra Cologne; 1977–1983	Succeeded by Gary Bertini
Preceded by Akeo Watanabe	Music Directors, Tokyo Metropolitan Symphony Orchestra; 1986–1995	Succeeded by Gary Bertini
Preceded by Thomas Novohradsky	Opera Artistic Directors, New National Theatre Tokyo; 2007–2009	Succeeded by Tadaaki Otaka
