= Gary Bertini =

Israeli composer and conductor (1927–2005)

- גארי ברתיני
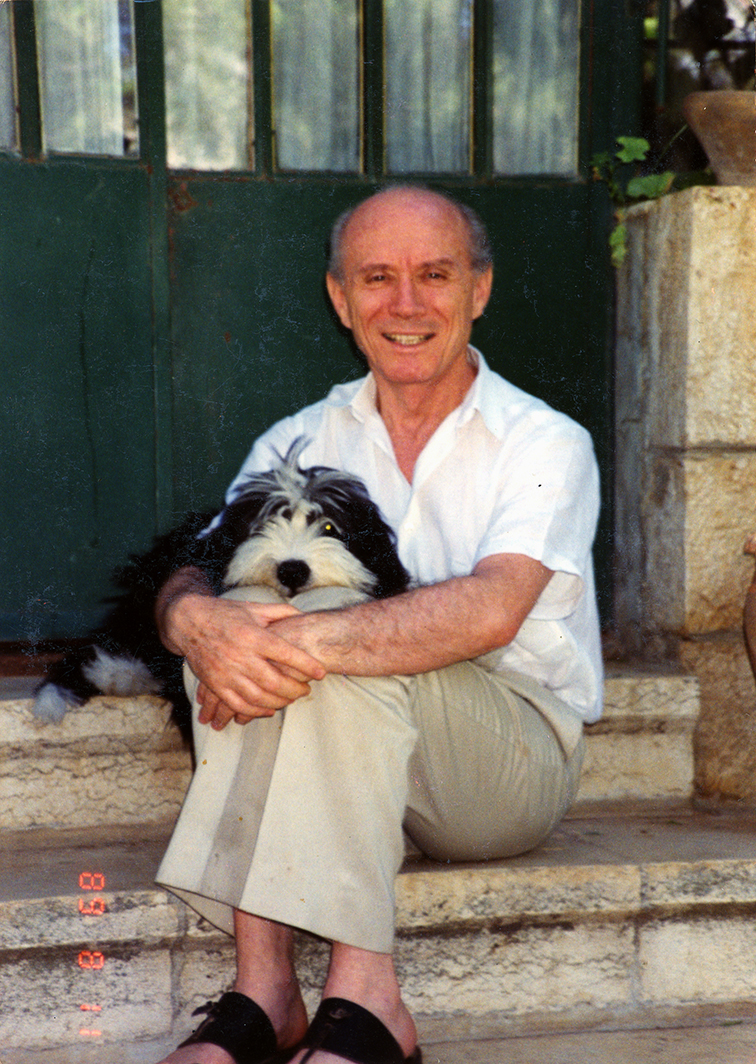
- Born: May 1, 1927; Brichevo, Moldavia
- Died: March 17, 2005 (aged 77); Israel
- Citizenship: Israeli
- Occupations: Conductor and Composer
- Spouse: Rosette Bertini
- Website: www.garybertini.com

Gary Bertini (Hebrew: גארי ברתיני; May 1, 1927 – March 17, 2005) was an Israeli musician and conductor. In 1978 he was awarded the Israel Prize for Music.

== Biography ==
Gary Bertini was born Shloyme Golergant in Bricheva, Bessarabia, then in Romania, now in Donduşeni District, Moldova. His father, K. A. Bertini (Aron Golergant), was a poet and translator of the Russian (Leonid Andereyev) and Yiddish (A.Sutzkever, H. Leivick) literature into Hebrew, and of the Hebrew works into Yiddish. His mother Berta Golergant was a physician and biologist. They immigrated to Palestine in 1946. Gary studied music at the Music Teachers' College in Tel Aviv and then in Milan, Italy, and at the Paris Conservatoire.

Upon returning to Israel, Bertini established Rinat (the Israel Chamber Choir) in 1955. He was musical advisor to the Batsheva Dance Company and composed original music for numerous productions of Habima, the Israel national theater, and the Cameri Theatre. He founded the Israel Chamber Orchestra in 1965 and was its conductor until 1975. In 1971 he conducted the world premiere of Josef Tal's Ashmedai at the Hamburg State Opera.

Bertini was conductor of the Jerusalem Symphony Orchestra from 1978 to 1986. He was also the artistic director of the Israeli Opera from 1988 to 1997. He promoted Israeli music and helped shape it.

Bertini was hospitalized while in Paris, then transferred to a hospital in Tel Hashomer, Israel. He died there on March 17, 2005, and was buried in Kfar Vitkin.

Bertini's work also took him outside Israel. He was music advisor to the Detroit Symphony Orchestra from 1981 to 1983 and the principal conductor of the Cologne Radio Symphony Orchestra from 1983 until 1991. He also served as general music director of the Opern- und Schauspielhaus Frankfurt from 1987 to 1991, the Tokyo Metropolitan Symphony Orchestra from 1998 to 2005, and, just before he died, director of the Teatro di San Carlo in Naples. He also worked as a guest conductor with the Hamburg State Opera, Scottish Opera, La Scala, Opéra National de Paris, and the Berlin Philharmonic among other organizations.

Bertini's recording of the complete cycle of Mahler symphonies (EMI Classics 40238) is very well regarded.

== Awards ==
- 1978 – Israel Prize for Music, Israel
- 1995 – Abiatti Prize: Best Conductor, Italy
- 1998 – Abiatti Prize: Best Operatic Conductor, Italy
- 2000 – Prime Minister Award for Composers, Israel
- 2003 – Académie Charles Cros – Grand Prix Audiovisuel & DVD pour Prokofiev: La Guerre et la Paix, France

Cultural offices
Preceded by Hiroshi Wakasugi	Principal Conductor, WDR Symphony Orchestra Cologne; 1983–1991	Succeeded by Hans Vonk
Preceded by Michael Gielen	General Music Director, Frankfurt Opera; 1987–1991	Succeeded by Sylvain Cambreling
Preceded by Hiroshi Wakasugi	Music Director, Tokyo Metropolitan Symphony Orchestra; 1998–2005	Succeeded by James DePreist
Preceded by Gabriele Ferro	Music Director, Teatro di San Carlo in Naples; 2004	Succeeded by Jeffrey Tate
