= Tokyo Metropolitan Symphony Orchestra =

Japanese symphony orchestra

Tokyo Metropolitan Symphony Orchestra (TMSO) 東京都交響楽団
- Orchestra
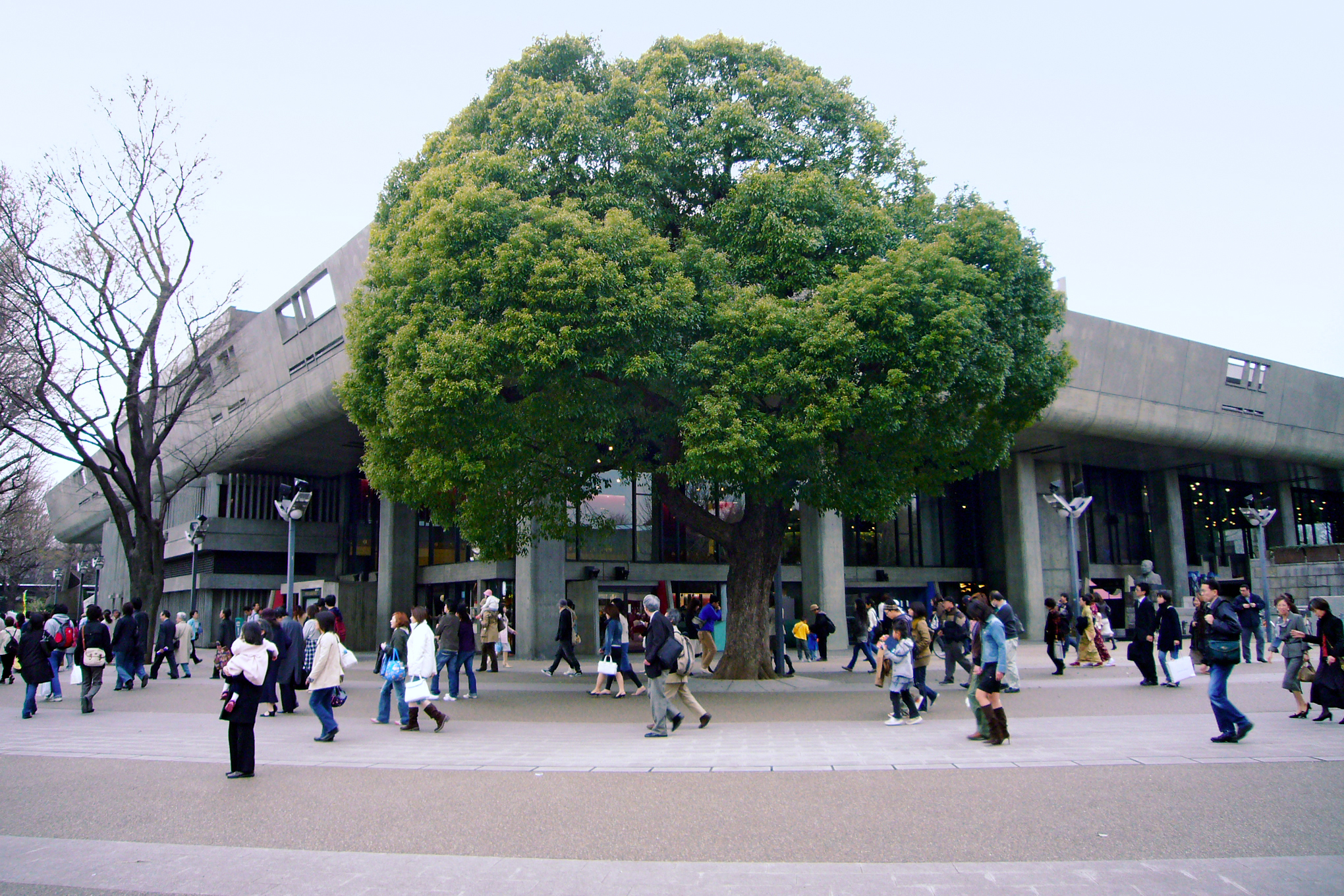
- Founded: 1965
- Concert hall: Tokyo Bunka Kaikan, Suntory Hall, Tokyo Metropolitan Theatre
- Music director: Kazushi Ōno
- Website: Tokyo Metropolitan Symphony Orchestra

The Tokyo Metropolitan Symphony Orchestra (東京都交響楽団, Tōkyo-to Kōkyō Gakudan) (also known as Tokyō (都響)) is a Japanese orchestra based in Tokyo. Their offices are based at the Tokyo Bunka Kaikan, a concert venue owned by the Tokyo Metropolitan Government. The orchestra performs regularly at Tokyo Bunka Kaikan, Suntory Hall and Tokyo Metropolitan Theatre.

== History ==
The Tokyo Metropolitan Government established the orchestra in 1965, in the aftermath of the Tokyo Olympics (1964 Summer Olympics). Heinz Hofmann was the first titled conductor of the orchestra, serving from 1965 to 1967. Through the work of Hiroshi Wakasugi, Eliahu Inbal and Gary Bertini in particular, the orchestra has regularly featured the symphonies of Gustav Mahler..

The current music director of the orchestra is Kazushi Ōno, since April 2015. His most recent contract extension with the orchestra, announced in October 2021, is through March 2026. Ōno is scheduled to conclude his tenure as the orchestra's music director in April 2026, and subsequently to take the title of artistic advisor for two years, and after that to take the title of conductor laureate.

Since April 2018, Alan Gilbert has served as the orchestra's principal guest conductor. In September 2025, the orchestra announced that Gilbert's title with the orchestra is to change to permanent guest conductor and music partner. Kazuhiro Koizumi, principal conductor of the orchestra from 1995 to 1998, subsequently principal guest conductor from 1998 to 2008, then resident conductor from 2008 to 2014, now has the title of 'Honorary Conductor for Life', since April 2014. Eliahu Inbal was principal conductor of the orchestra from 2008 to 2014, and since April 2014 has the title of conductor laureate of the orchestra. In September 2025, the orchestra announced the appointment of Daniele Rustioni as its next principal guest conductor, effective April 2026.

In April 2024, Pekka Kuusisto first guest-conducted the orchestra. In September 2025, the orchestra announced the appointment of Kuusisto as its new chief conductor, effective April 2028, with an initial contract of three years.

== Conductors ==
=== Music directors, permanent conductors, and principal conductors ===
- Heinz Hofmann (music director and permanent conductor, 1965–1967)
- Tadashi Mori (music director and permanent conductor, 1967–1972)
- Akeo Watanabe (music director and permanent conductor, 1972–1978)
- Moshe Atzmon (principal conductor and music adviser, 1978–1983)
- Hiroshi Wakasugi (music director and principal conductor, 1986–1995)
- Kazuhiro Koizumi (principal conductor, 1995–1998)
- Gary Bertini (music director, 1998–2005)
- James DePreist (permanent conductor, 2005–2008)
- Eliahu Inbal (principal conductor, 2008–2014)
- Kazushi Ōno (music director, 2015–present)

=== Principal guest conductors ===
- Jakub Hrůša (2010–2018)
- Alan Gilbert (2018–present)

== Awards ==
- Kyoto Music Award (1991)
- Japan's 50th Record Academy Award for Best Symphony Album (E.Inbal/ Shostakovich: Symphony No. 4, 2012)
- Japan's 53rd Record Academy Award for Special Award (E.Inbal+TMSO/ Neuer Mahler-Zyklus 2012–2013)

== Note ==
- The Tokyo Metropolitan Symphony Orchestra (都響, Tokyō) tends to be confused with the Tokyo Symphony Orchestra (東響, Tōkyō).
- The orchestra had mainly performed only classical music but came to also perform other symphonic music since around 2000, such as Dragon Quest soundtracks with Koichi Sugiyama, and soundtracks for Nodame Cantabile (anime and TV drama) and Red Cliff (film).
