= Jacob Gilboa =

Israeli composer

- יהודה יעקוב גלבוע
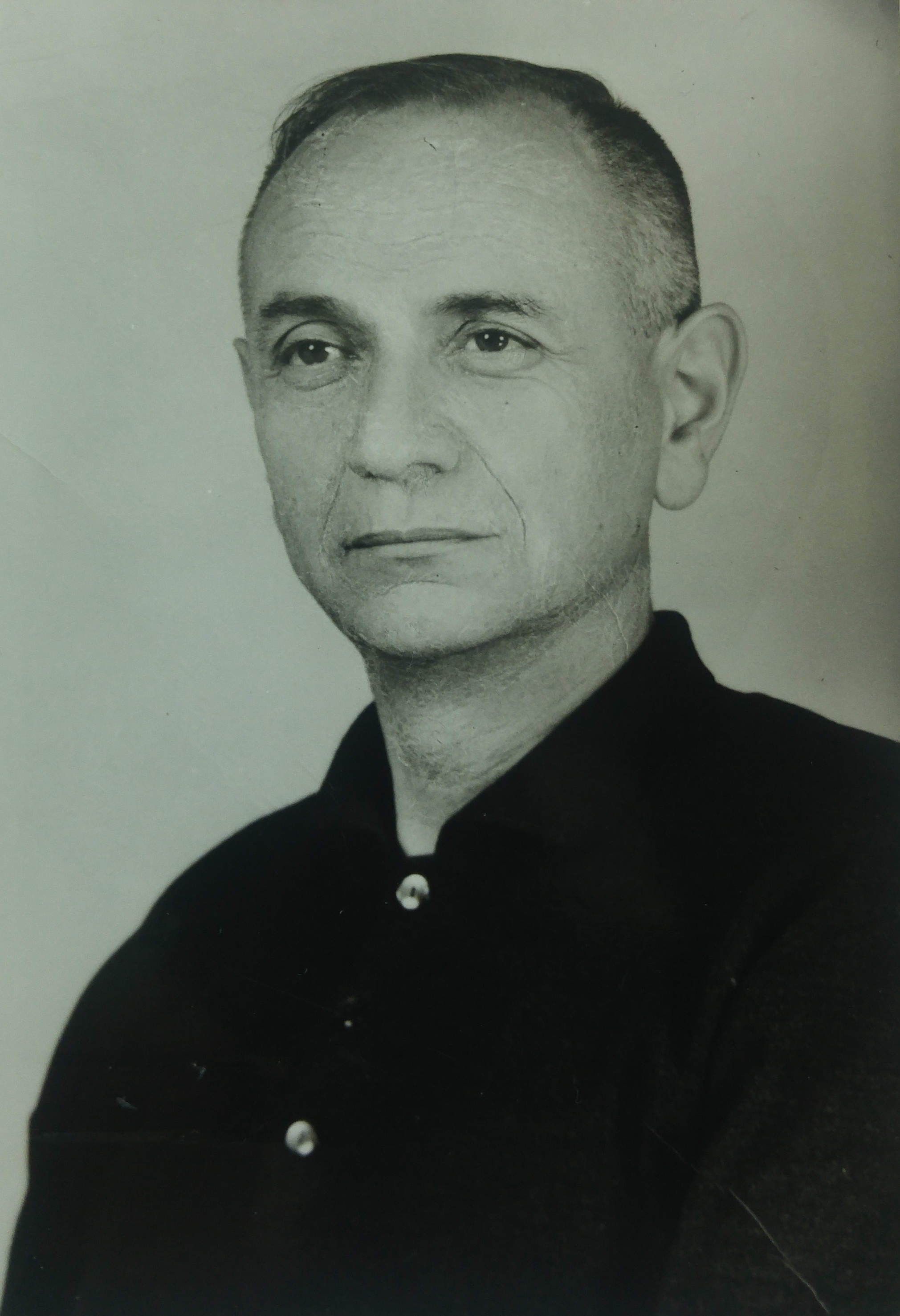
- Jacob Gilboa in 1973
- Born: Erwin Goldberg; 2 May 1920; Košice, Czechoslovakia
- Died: 9 May 2007 (aged 87); Tel Aviv, Israel
- Education: Jerusalem Academy of Music and Dance
- Occupation: Composer
- Musical career
- Genres: Contemporary classical

Jacob Gilboa (Hebrew: יהודה יעקוב גלבוע; May 2, 1920 – May 9, 2007) was an Israeli composer.

== Biography ==
Erwin Goldberg (later Jacob Gilboa) was born in Košice, Czechoslovakia. Some years later he lived in Vienna, where he received training in playing the piano. In 1938 he immigrated to Mandatory Palestine, where he initially studied in Haifa at the Institute for Technology. Starting in 1944 he studied at the Jerusalem Academy of Music with Josef Tal and Paul Ben-Haim.

== Music career ==
His participation in the Courses for New Music in Cologne in 1963 and 1964 under Karlheinz Stockhausen and Henri Pousseur made a strong impact on his style, which changed to include clusters, quarter tones, electronics, and unconventional instrumental combinations.

His best-known work is Twelve Glass Windows of Chagall in Jerusalem, for voice and instruments (1966). In addition, he composed Thistles, for horn, percussion, piano, and cello (1967), Pastels for two pianos, the piano suite Seven Little Insects (1956), and The Grey Colours of Käthe Kollwitz for mezzo-soprano, chamber orchestra, and tape.

He died in Tel Aviv, Israel.

== See also ==
- Music of Israel
