= Tadashi Mori =

Japanese conductor and flautist

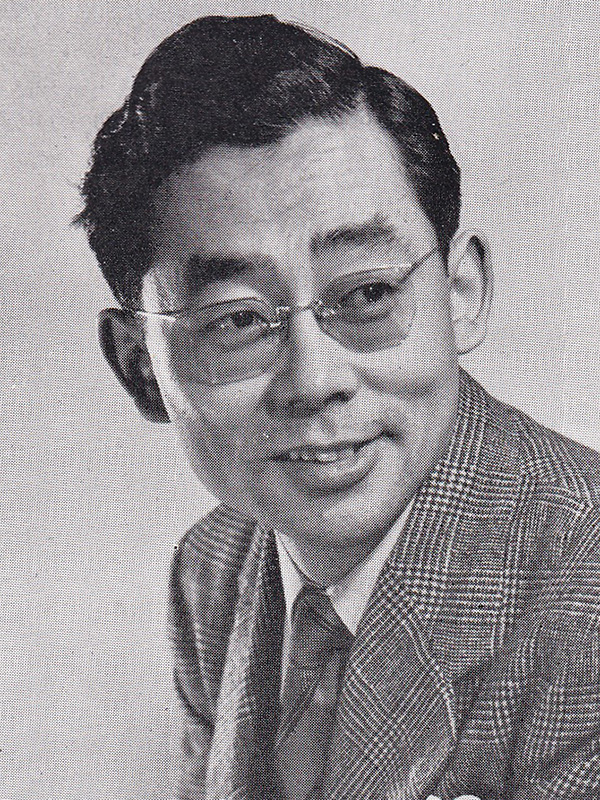
- 1956
- Born: 4 December 1921; Japan, Tokyo
- Died: 4 March 1987 (aged 65); Japan, Tokyo
- Other name: 森 正
- Occupations: conductor, flautist

Tadashi Mori (森 正, Mori Tadashi; 14 December 1921 – 4 May 1987) was a Japanese conductor and flautist.

He performed as flautist in his young days. He studied conducting from Hideo Saito, and started his career as conductor.

Mori was a music director and principal conductor of the Tokyo Metropolitan Symphony Orchestra in 1967–72, and permanent conductor of the Kyoto Symphony Orchestra in 1963–66. In 1967, he became the first music director of the Tokyo Symphony Orchestra, and made base as professional orchestra.
