= Israel Eliraz =

Israeli poet (1936–2016)

- ישראל אלירז
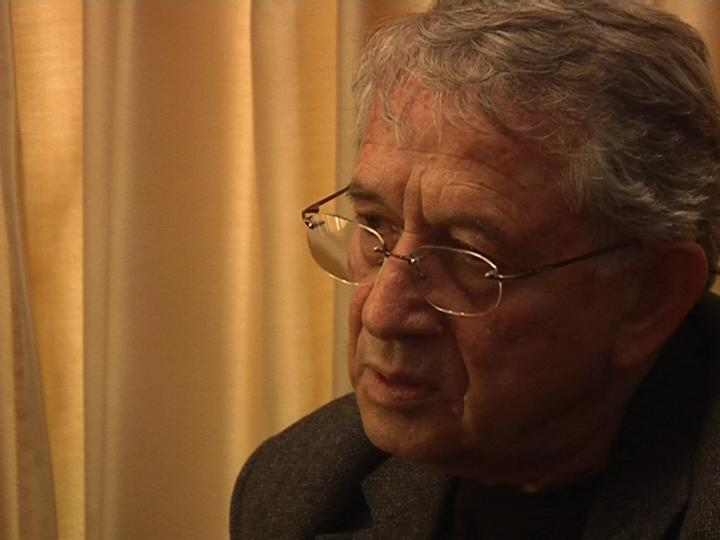
- Israel Eliraz in 2007
- Born: Israel Rothstein; 23 March 1936; Jerusalem, Mandatory Palestine
- Died: 22 March 2016 (aged 79); Jerusalem, Israel
- Resting place: Kiryat Anavim, Israel
- Education: Hebrew University of Jerusalem; Tel Aviv University; University of Paris
- Occupations: Poet, educator
- Notable work: Libretto for Ashmedai
- Spouse: Naomi Brunner
- Children: 3
- Awards: Bialik Prize (2008); Brenner Prize (2013); ACUM Lifetime Achievement Award (2003); Nathan Alterman Award (2002); Jerusalem Foundation-Jerusalem Municipality’s Belles-Lettres Award (1992, 1999); Israeli Council of Culture and Art Award (1963, 1965); Ministry of Culture and Sport Award (2009); Prime Minister’s Prize for Creative Work (1994, 2008, 2009)

Israel Eliraz (Hebrew: ישראל אלירז; born Israel Rothstein on 23 March 1936, Hebrew: ישראל רוטשטיין; died on 22 March 2016) was an Israeli poet who won the Bialik Prize (2008), the Brenner Prize (2013), the ACUM lifetime achievement award (2003), the Nathan Alterman Award (2002), the Jerusalem Foundation-Jerusalem Municipality’s Belles-Lettres Award (1992 and 1999), the Israeli Council of Culture and Art Award (1963 and 1965), the Ministry of Culture and Sport Award (2009), and the Prime Minister’s Prize for Creative Work (1994, 2008, and 2009).

== Biography ==
Born Israel Rothstein on 23 March 1936 to a religious family in the Knesset Yisrael neighborhood of Jerusalem, his parents were Ya’akov and Shifra Rothstein. He attended Alliance Israélite Universelle and Hebrew University of Jerusalem where he specialized in Jewish literature and philosophy, received his master’s degree from Tel Aviv University where he specialized in comparative literary studies, started writing poetry in 1980, studied theatre at University of Paris between 1995 and 1996 on a stipend from the French government, and worked for a living as a teacher and principal at Gymnasia Rehavia and as an instructor at Kerem Institute for Teacher Training. Occasionally he would also lecture in France, Belgium, and the United States: for example he was visiting professor of drama at Virginia Commonwealth University in 1980 and was invited to Biennale Internationale des Poètes en Val-de-Marne in 1999 and to Centre communautaire laïc juif in 1998.

He lived in Jerusalem all his life and was married to Naomi née Brunner with whom he had three children.

Eliraz died on 22 March 2016 in Jerusalem, Jerusalem District. His resting place is in Kiryat Anavim, Mateh Yehuda Regional Council, Jerusalem District, Israel.

He wrote the libretto for Josef Tal's opera Ashmedai which premiered at the Hamburg State Opera in 1971, and was mounted at the New York City Opera in 1976.

== Publications ==
- אלירז, ישראל. דְּבָרִים דְּחוּפִים: מבחר שירים 1980–2010, עורך: ד״ר דרור בורשטיין, עם ״איך אלירז יכול לשנות את חייך,״ עמ׳ 380–390 מאת ד״ר דרור בורשטיין. תל אביב–יפו: הוצאת הקיבוץ המאוחד, ה׳תש״ע/2010, 392 עמ׳. (in Hebrew)

Haaretz critic Prof. Dr. Miron Chaim Izakson wrote about this book that upon reading it he felt as if he “received endless letters from the poet regarding existential wonders" while Iton 77 critic Amos Levitan said that it changed his life.

- אלירז, ישראל. הֵבִּט: שירה מביטה בציור – בעקבות ציוריו של יהושע (שוקי) בורקובסקי. תל אביב–יפו: קשב לשירה, ה׳תשע״ב/2012, 132 עמ׳. (in Hebrew)

Haaretz critic Ouzi Zur praised this book's “wonderful poetic introspection regarding the quintessence of seeing.”

- אלירז, ישראל. כַּמָּה זְמַן עוֹד נִשְׁאַר אֵינֶנָּה שְׁאֵלָה אֶלָּא דֶּלֶת . תל אביב–יפו ובן־שמן: הליקון ומודן הוצאה לאור, ה׳תשע״ג/2013, 96 עמ׳. (in Hebrew)
