= Ashmedai (opera) =

Hebrew-language opera by Josef Tal

- Opera by Josef Tal
- Librettist: Israel Eliraz
- Language: Hebrew
- Based on: Talmud
- Premiere: 30 October 1971; Hamburg State Opera

Ashmedai is an opera in 2 acts by composer Josef Tal with a Hebrew-language libretto by Israel Eliraz that was created in 1969.

The story is based on the Talmud and tells the tale of a peace-loving country that is corrupted by the devil. Commissioned by the Hamburg State Opera, the work premiered there in October 1971 in a production directed by Leopold Lindtberg and led by conductor Gary Bertini. The music employs twelve-tone technique, serialism, and musical expressionism in the vein of Arnold Schoenberg and Alban Berg, and is Wagnerian in scope. The music is scored for soloists, chorus, orchestra, and electronic music. The United States premiere of the opera was given by the New York City Opera at the New York State Theater, Lincoln Center, on April 1, 1976. That production was directed by Hal Prince and starred John Lankston in the title role, Eileen Schauler as the Queen, Paul Ukena as the King, and Patricia Craig as the Mistress of the Inn.
