= Assaf Shelleg =

Israeli-American musicologist and pianist

- אסף שלג
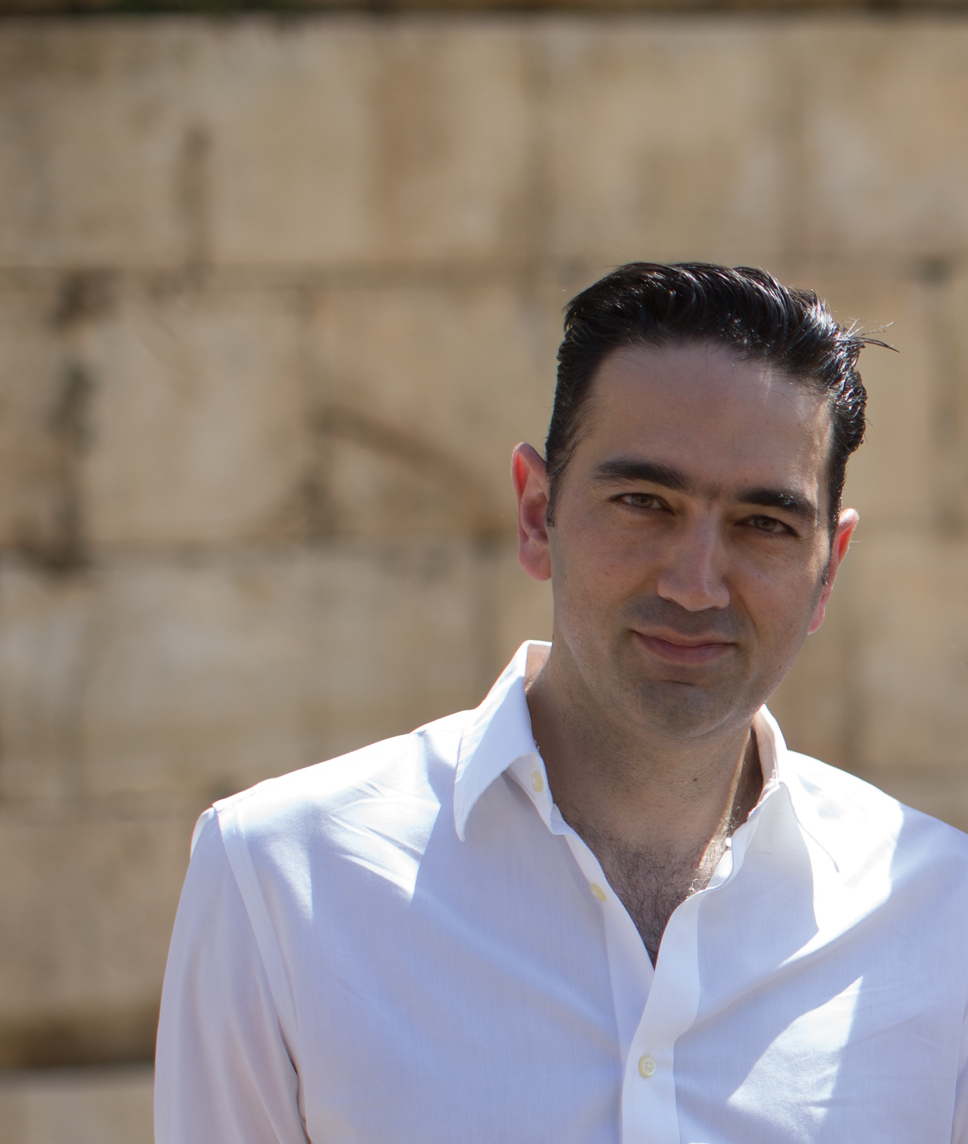
- Assaf Shelleg
- Occupations: Musicologist, pianist, curator
- Known for: Modern and contemporary art music
- Notable work: Jewish Contiguities and the Soundtrack of Israeli History (Oxford, 2014); Theological Stains: Art Music and the Zionist Project (Oxford, 2020); The State of Afterness (Oxford, 2025)
- Awards: Engel Prize (2015); Jordan Schnitzer Book Award (2016)
- Website: https://www.assafshelleg.com

Assaf Shelleg (Hebrew: אסף שלג) is an Israeli-American musicologist and cultural-historian. He specializes in twentieth- and twenty-first-century music, focusing on art music written by and about Jews. Prior to his appointment at the Hebrew University of Jerusalem, he taught at the University of Virginia and Washington University in St. Louis. Shelleg is the author of the award-winning book Jewish Contiguities and the Soundtrack of Israeli History (Oxford University Press, 2014), Theological Stains: Art Music and the Zionist Project (Oxford University Press, 2020) and The State of Afterness: Contemporary Music in and about Israel (Oxford University Press, 2025). Previously the director of the Cherrick Center for the Study of Zionism, the Yishuv, and the State of Israel at the Hebrew University, he has also served as a curator for the Israel Philharmonic Orchestra and as a music contributor for Haaretz. Shelleg's new book, Jewish Art Music as Art Music, is forthcoming with Cambridge University Press in 2026.

Shelleg's award-winning first book, Jewish Contiguities and the Soundtrack of Israeli History, studies the emergence of modern Jewish art music in Central and Western Europe in the early twentieth century and traces its partial dislocation to British Palestine/Israel in the 1930s. Unearthing the cultural chain reactions this dislocation had set in Hebrew culture from the 1930s and through the 1970, the book maps composers' gradual disillusionment with romanticist nationalism amid the dissemination of modernist compositional devices and contiguous developments in modern Hebrew literature. Jewish Contiguities won the 2015 Engel Prize for the study of Hebrew Music, and the 2016 Jordan Schnitzer Book Award of the Association for Jewish Studies (AJS).

Shelleg's Theological Stains; Art Music and the Zionist Project is the first in-depth study on art music in Israel from the mid-twentieth century to the turn of the twenty-first. It unfolds the theological and territorial infrastructures of national Hebrew culture while critically reading the works and archival collections of Mordecai Seter, Paul Ben-Haim, Oedoen Partos, Josef Tal, Ben-Zion Orgad, Marc Lavri, Andre Hajdu, Abel Ehrlich, Tzvi Avni, Betty Olivero, and Ruben Seroussi. In the process, Theological Stains discloses how importations of modernist compositional devices constituted composers' perceptions of Jewish musical traditions as much as they facilitated their dialectical returns to diasporic Jewish cultures, returns that among other things invalidated national and territorial tropes.

The State of Afterness: Contemporary Music in and about Israel, was released in January 2025 with Oxford University Press. The book traces the histories and cultural histories of contemporary music in Israel since the 1980s. With afterness defined as the state of being unconditioned by territorialism while opting for previously unavailable temporalities and ethnographies, Assaf Shelleg studies the compositional approaches that record the attenuation of territorial nationalism and assembles a network of composers trained in the post-ideological climate of the 1970s and 1980s. This network features operas, electronic music, orchestral and ensemble works by Chaya Czernowin, Betty Olivero, Luciano Berio, Leon Schidlowsky, Josef Bardanashvili, Arik (Arie) Shapira, in addition Jewish oral musical traditions, and novels by David Grossman, A. B. Yehoshua, Yishai Sarid, and Ruby Namdar. While in previous eras the state superseded or subsumed any competing political project, since the 1980s such self-referential acts have been losing their ability to confer homogeneity and communicate the monologic of national Hebrew culture and its telos. As a result, Shelleg notes, the composers discussed in this book do not form a cohesive group, yet they share constituent cultural and political sensibilities: irrespective of their aesthetic choices they opt for diasporism but refrain from universalizing Jewish diasporas (as did classic Zionism); they display postmodern patrimonies but reject their essentialist qualities; they seek to undo the differences between ethnography and art; they admonish their country's ethnocracy and democratic façade; they denationalize Holocaust memorialization; and they narrate the failure of territorial nationalism.

Shelleg is also a regular musical contributor to Haaretz newspaper.
