= Klari Szarvas =

Klari Szarvas

Klari Szarvas-Weissgerber (Hebrew: קלארי סארוואש; May 12, 1911 – January 12, 2007) was an Israeli harp player and teacher.

== Biography ==
Klara (Klari) Szarvas was born in 1911 in Budapest, the capital of Hungary, to a non-observant, culturally assimilated, Jewish family. She was the eldest daughter of Nelli (Kornelia) Szarvas (née Wolfson) and Felix Szarvas, a gynecologist and an obstetrician. Her sister, Illy (Ilona) was three years younger than her. She started playing the piano when she six, and the harp when she was ten. During her youth she went on concert tours throughout Europe. In 1932 she married Lazi (Vladislav) Pataki, who was a chemical engineer by training and vocation, however he preferred his part-time word as a music critic.

In 1933, after the Nazis came to power, a wave of antisemitism overtook Europe, and especially Germany. Jewish players were fired from the orchestras they played in. In 1936, the violinist Bronisław Huberman toured Europe, and chose the top players to form the hard core for founding the Israel Philharmonic Orchestra. In 1938 Huberman invited Klari Szarvas to join the orchestra, which needed a harp player. She came to Eretz Israel for a five-week trial visit, and afterwards decided to accept Huberman's invitation. In September 1938 she immigrated with her husband and settled in Tel Aviv, where she continued to reside until 1961, when she moved to Jerusalem. In 1940, their daughter Ilana was born, however, after a few months they decided to separate. In 1946 Szarvas married Yoseph (Beppo) Weissgerber, a Cellist with the philharmonic. Their son Roni was born in 1947.

Szarvas and Weisberger performed together in chamber concerts as well, until Yoseph died at the end of 1954. Szarvas won awards in harp competitions before she immigrated to Israel, and was also a judge in The International Harp Contest in Israel. In addition to playing as a member of the orchestra, she also performed as a soloist with various orchestras. She was also a harp teacher. Among her students: Edna Buchman.

While she was living in Jerusalem, Szarvas played in Jerusalem Symphony Orchestra.

In her later years, when she could no longer live alone, Szarvas moved from Jerusalem to Haifa, and lived with her daughter Ilana, and Ilana's husband Rafi. She lived with them from the summer of 1997 until her death at January 17, 2007.

Szarvas's daughter, Ilana Sivan, is the widow of Raphael (Rafi) Sivan (Zussman) (1935–2011), a professor of Electrical engineering in the Technion – Israel Institute of Technology, an expert in automated control, who served in senior roles in the Technion. Their son Ori Sivan (Szarvas's grandson) is a television and film director. Her son, Dr Ron (Roni) Kuzar, is a Linguist and an Associate Professor in the Department of English Literature and Language in the University of Haifa.

In 2008, Ori Sivan's Documentary film, "Behind the Strings"(33 min.) was released. A film about his grandmother, Klari Szarvas (The film was screened at the Cinema South Film Festival in 2009). In 2010 Sivan's documentary "Zubin and Me" was released, a film about the conductor Zubin Mehta and about Ori Sivan's grandmother, Klari Szarvas (the film was broadcast on channel 8, the science and culture channel, as part of the series "Culture Heroes").
