= Ben-Zion Orgad =

German-Israeli composer (1926–2006)

Ben-Zion Orgad בן ציון אורגד
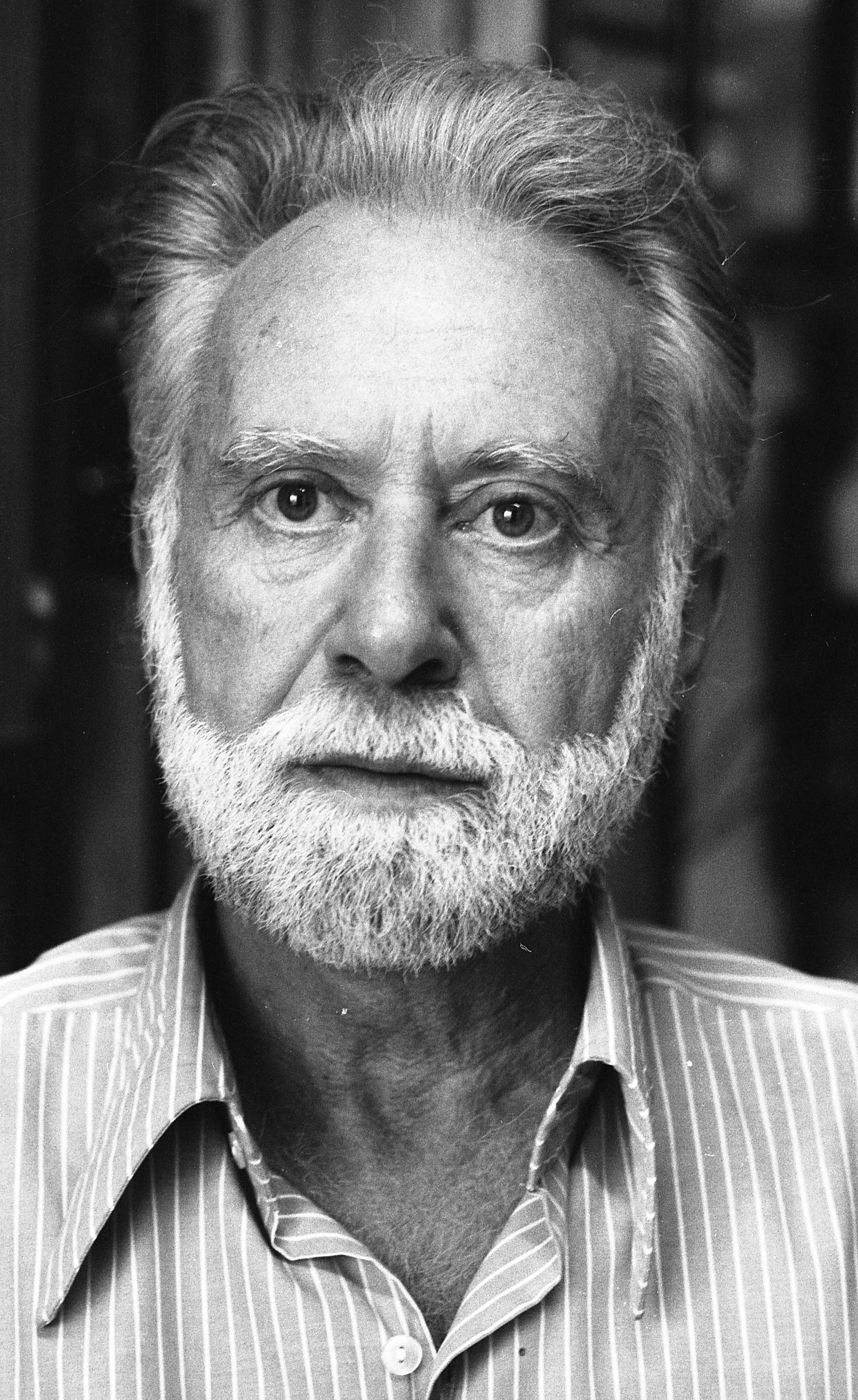
- Portrait of Ben-Zion Orgad

Background information
- Born: Ben-Zion Büschel; August 21, 1926; Gelsenkirchen, Germany
- Origin: Israel
- Died: April 28, 2006 (aged 79) Tel Aviv, Israel
- Occupation: Composer
- Instrument: Violin
- Awards: Kussewitzky Prize of UNESCO (1952); Joel Engel Prize of the city of Tel Aviv (1961); Israel Prize for music (1997)

Ben-Zion Orgad (Hebrew: בן ציון אורגד, originally Ben-Zion Büschel; born Gelsenkirchen, Germany, 21 August 1926; died Tel Aviv, Israel, 28 April 2006) was an Israeli composer.

His family emigrated to Mandate Palestine in 1933, where he started violin lessons in 1936. From 1942 until 1946, Orgad studied violin and composing with Rudolf Bergmann and Paul Ben-Haim in Tel Aviv and in 1947 with Josef Tal in Jerusalem. In the years 1949, 1952, and 1961 he took part in composing courses at the Berkshire Music Center in Tanglewood, with Aaron Copland and others. From 1960 until 1962 he studied composing at Brandeis University in Waltham.

Beginning in 1956, Orgad was employed by the Israeli Ministry of Education, in the department of its school of music. His musical works consist primarily of choir music and songs, although he also wrote orchestral works and chamber music.

== Awards ==
- In 1952, Orgad received the Kussewitzky Prize of UNESCO.
- In 1961, he received the Joel Engel Prize of the city of Tel Aviv.
- In 1997, he was awarded the Israel Prize for music.

== See also ==
- List of Israel Prize recipients
