= Ada Brodsky =

Israeli journalist and translator

Ada Brodsky (née Ada Neumark) (Hebrew: עדה ברודסקי; born 30 October 1924, Frankfurt (Oder); died 12 April 2011, Jerusalem) was an Israeli radio journalist and translator from German into Hebrew. She was a winner of the Goethe Medal in 1995 for her contributions to the cultural relationship between Germany and Israel.

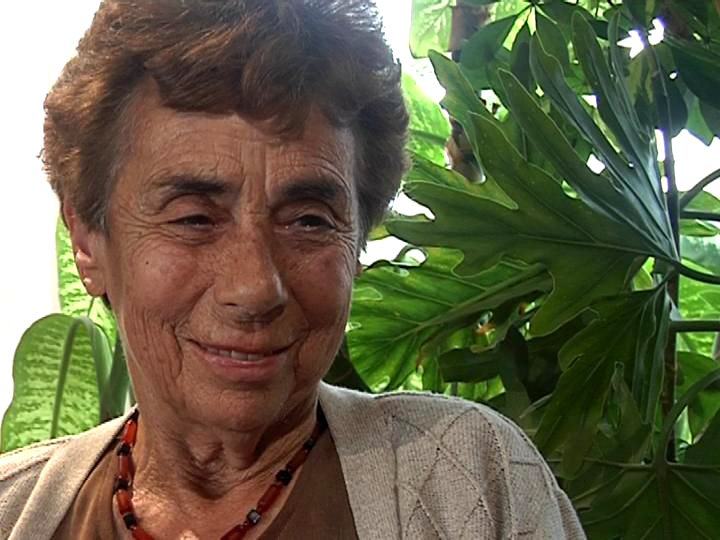
Ada Brodsky (2008)

== Life ==
Ada Neumark was born in Frankfurt (Oder) to Ilse Neumark and Hermann Neumark, a paediatrician. Her father worked at the municipal hospital as well as holding a private clinic. When the Nazi Party took power, he lost both positions. Her mother was a trained classical singer who had given up her professional career to take care of the family.

Both Ada and Alfred became active in a local Zionist youth movement to build Erez Israel. As the repression of the Jews built up in Germany, more and more families were trying to emigrate. Alfred won a music scholarship to Emil Hauser's musical conservatory in Palestine and was allowed to leave Germany in 1938. The same year, one of Neumark's stories was published in the Jüdischen Rundschau which convinced the Youth Aliyah that she was deserving of a scholarship to Palestine. She travelled on the kindertransport to Ben Shemen Youth Village via Trieste.

At Ben Shemen, Neumark received an education in which music, theatre and literature played a major role. She, with the other children, were also closely involved in agricultural work. Ada translated between the local Hebrew-speaking children and the new arrivals from Germany.

Neumark's parents needed a visa from the British Mandate in Palestine to emigrate there. This was a costly affair, requiring around £1,000 or 12,500 Reichsmarks, which they did not have. Ada's aunt who was already in Palestine collected the monies with great difficulty, and a relative with British citizenship had to personally deliver it in Germany to prevent it being confiscated by the Nazis. Hermann Neumark was already arrested and was released from the Sachsenhausen concentration camp only under the condition that he would leave Germany immediately. The visas arrived just in time to save the Neumarks.

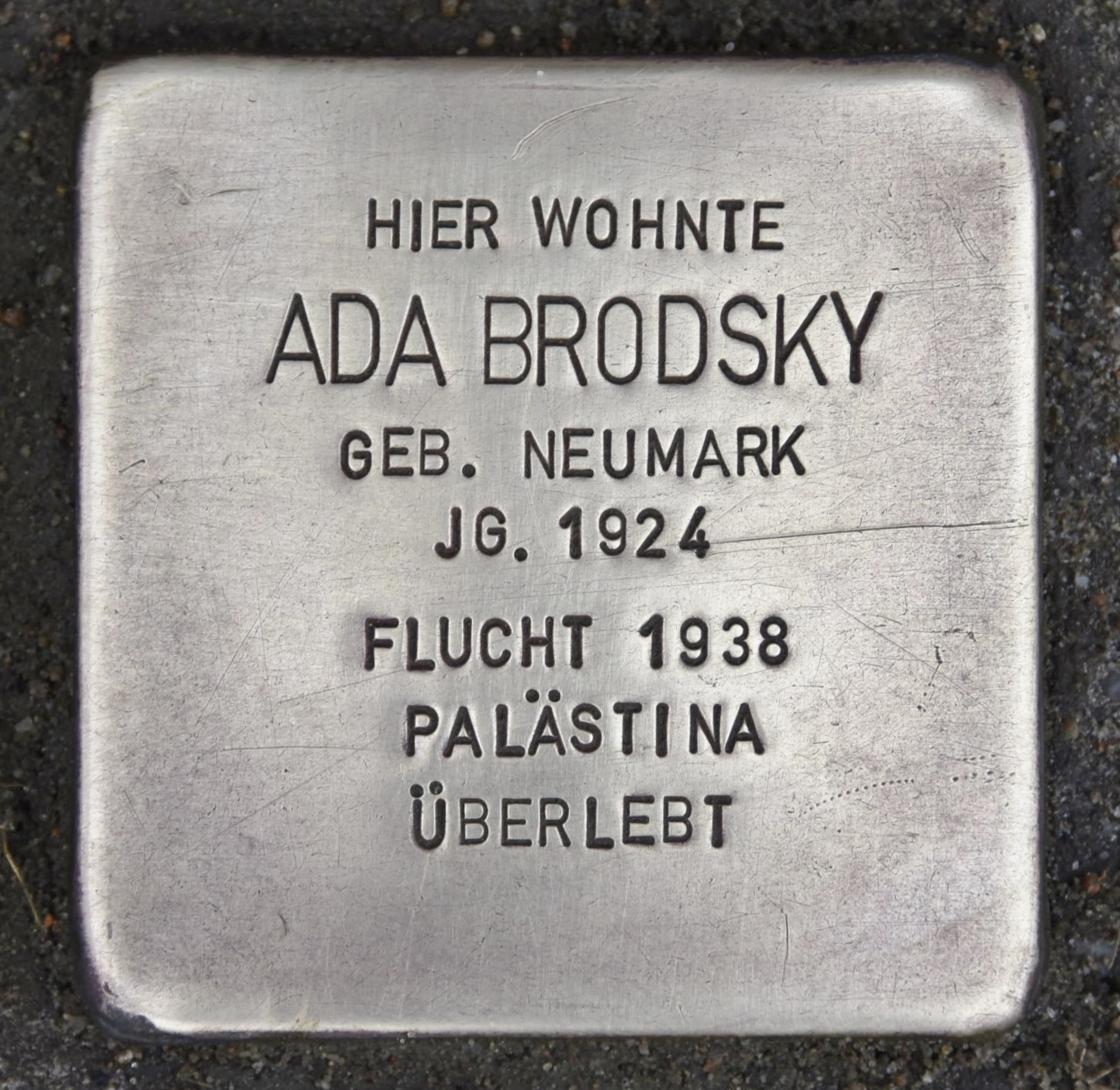
Memorial plaque for Ada Brodsky

In 1943, Neumark graduated high school and worked in a kibbutz. She then studied English literature and Jewish studies in Jerusalem, followed by courses in music education and musicology at the Jerusalem Academy of Music and Dance.

Neumark married David Brodsky and had two daughters with him. She died in Jerusalem on 12 April 2011.

Three plaques created by Gunter Demnig was laid in her and her parents' honour at their former home in Wilhelmsplatz in Frankfurt (Oder).

== Career ==
After her school years, Brodsky began to earn her livelihood by translating German songs into Hebrew. Lyrics from compositions by Brahms, Schubert and Mahler were impossible to perform or broadcast in the German language in Israel. Neumark published several books of translations into Hebrew.

Brodsky began to work at the radio station Kol HaMusica, which concentrated on classical music. She developed broadcasts over many years.

Brodsky had always loved the poetry of Rainer Maria Rilke. To introduce Israeli readers to his works, she self-published a monograph on the poet, and translated poems and prose texts into Hebrew. This manuscript is considered to be the standard work on Rilke in the Hebrew language.

Brodsky's interest in German literature was not restricted to the classical authors. She translated Ingeborg Bachmann's Probleme zeitgenössischer Dichtung in 2009.

In music, Brodsky edited a series of pedagogical texts, Words to Sounds.

In 1995, Brodsky received the Goethe Medal for her contributions to German culture.

== Selected works ==
=== Translations ===
- Rainer Maria Rilke (1999). Ausgezetzt auf den Bergen des Herzens. Translated by Ada Brodsky.
- Rainer Maria Rilke (1998). Die Sonette an Orpheus [Elegyot duʼino; ha-Soneṭim shel Orfeʼus]. Translated by Ada Brodsky. Karmel. ISBN 9789654071901.
- Josef Tal (1997). Reminiscences, Reflections, Summaries. Translated by Ada Brodsky. Jerusalem: Karmel. ISBN 965-407-162-2.

=== Musical texts ===
- Ada Brodsky, ed. (2013). The Liturgical Book. Words to Sounds. Jerusalem: Karmel.
- Ada Brodsky, ed. (2006). The German Lied from Hayden to Hindemith. Words to Sounds. Jerusalem: Karmel.
- Ada Brodsky, ed. (1995). From the concert hall: orchestral and chamber works from Beethoven to Shostakovich. Words to Sounds. Jerusalem: Karmel.
- Ada Brodsky, ed. (1989). The German Lied from Mozart to Mahler. Words to Sounds. Hakkibutz Hameuchad.

=== Others ===
- Ada Brodsky (1995). Anekdotot musikaliyot. Karmel. ISBN 978-9654071055.
- Ada Brodsky (1994). Rainer Mariyah Rilkeh: Darko shel meshorer. Karmel. ISBN 978-9654070782.

== Additional sources ==
- Staas, Christian (14 November 2008). "Letzte Zuflucht". Zeit Online.
- "GOETHE-MEDAILLE: DIE PREISTRÄGER 1955 – 2018" (PDF). Goethe Institut.
- Shapira, Avner (14 April 2011). "Translator and music editor Ada Brodsky died at the age of 86". Haaretz.
- Jessen, Caroline (2011). Ada Brodsky: Keine leichte Pakete (PDF). Jerusalem: Goethe Institut.
