= Shalhevet Freier =

Israeli scientist

Shalhevet Freier during his service in the British army, 1944

Shalhevet Freier (Hebrew: שלהבת פריאר; 16 July 1920 – 27 November 1994) was an Israeli physicist and administrator.

Freier was born in Eschwege, Germany, the son of Rabbi Dr. Moritz (Moshe Yissachar) Freier and Recha Freier, founder of the Youth Aliyah organization. In 1937, while studying at a Christian school, he composed an essay expressing opposition to Nazi doctrine, which led to his expulsion. At his request, his parents sent him to England to continue his education.

In 1940, he immigrated to British Mandated Palestine and was accepted as a student in the Department of Mathematics at the Hebrew University in Jerusalem. Upon completing his first year, his mother arrived and settled in the Katamon neighborhood of Jerusalem, after which he joined the British Army in 1941, and served in the Jewish 462nd General Transport Company in North Africa and Italy. In 1943, his unit boarded the Erinpura, the lead convoy ship ferrying units from the North African to European theaters. While crossing the Mediterranean Sea from Alexandria to Malta, German planes spotted the 27-ship convoy, resulting in an attack where the Erinpura sank within four minutes. Amongst the 664 casualties were 139 members of the 462nd. Amazingly, Freier survived. In 1946, he joined other former 462nd members in the clandestine "Ha’Chavura" organization, also known as "The Shadow Unit", whose aim was to assist Jewish refugees and bring them to Palestine. Freier's immaculate English and British accent enabled him to impersonate British officers while transporting refugees through Italy in British army vehicles. Additionally, the unit engaged in weapons acquisition for the defense of Jewish settlements in British Mandated Palestine. After eight successful clandestine immigration operations, the ninth, in May 1946, went sour. Freier was apprehended and sent to an Italian prison, where he nonetheless continued to operate, until his release and military discharge in late 1946. He then returned to the Hebrew University to complete his studies in mathematics and physics, and supported himself through private tutoring.

In the 1947–1949 Palestine war, he commanded the "Yerucham" intelligence unit in Jerusalem, and later joined the staff of the Foreign Ministry as an intelligence officer. As a result of a professional difference of opinion with his superiors he left and resumed his studies at the university. During this time, he worked as a journalist writing a column for The Jerusalem Post. Between 1953 and 1954, after completing his bachelor's degree at the Hebrew University, he became the director of the "Emet" unit of the Ministry of Defense, which ultimately developed into Rafael Advanced Defense Systems Ltd.

Between 1956 and 1959, Freier served as the scientific advisor to the Israeli embassy in Paris. In this capacity, he played a leading role in the scientific cooperation between the French and Israeli governments in initiating atomic research in Israel. Between 1960 and 1966, he continued studying physics at the Weizmann Institute, completing his master's degree, and working towards a doctorate. In 1967 he was appointed vice-president of the Weizmann Institute.

In 1970, Freier was appointed director of the atomic reactor in Nahal Soreq and, a year later, director general of the Israel Atomic Energy Commission, serving in this capacity until 1976. During the Yom Kippur War, he was summoned to the office of Prime Minister Golda Meir by Defense Minister Moshe Dayan, who recommended a show of Israel's atomic ability – a recommendation that was never accepted.

From 1981 until his death, Freier was the head of the political department of the Israel Atomic Energy Commission.

In 1971, Freier initiated the establishment of Israel's first Hi-Tech Science Park between Rehovot and Nes Tziona.

Freier chaired the Israeli group of Pugwash Conferences on Science and World Affairs and served on the Pugwash Council.

== Commemoration ==
In Freier's memory, the Shalhevet Freier Center for Peace, Science and Technology was established at the Nahal Soreq nuclear research facility in 1996.

Additionally, The Weizmann Institute of Science holds an annual contest in physics: "The Shalhevet Freier Safe Competition". The international contest is open to secondary schools, where each team builds a safe locked by principles of physics and attempts to unlock the safes built by competing teams.

In his memory Freier's sister-in-law, Miriam Freier, established the "Shalhevet Home for the Disabled" in Jerusalem, an apartment house where each physically handicapped member can lead an independent existence.
