= Mifflin =

Mifflin may refer to:

== Court cases ==
- Mifflin v. Dutton (1903), United States Supreme Court case
- Suntrust Bank v. Houghton Mifflin Co. (2001) United States Court of Appeals for the Eleventh Circuit case

== People ==
=== People with the surname Mifflin ===
- Mifflin (surname)

=== People with the given name Mifflin ===
- Mifflin E. Bell (1847–1904) American architect
- Mifflin Wistar Gibbs (1823–1915) American journalist
- Mifflin Kenedy (1818–1895) American businessman and rancher in Texas

=== People with the middle name Mifflin ===
- George Mifflin Bache (1841–1896) American military leader
- George Mifflin Dallas (1792–1864) American politician and diplomat
- John Mifflin Hood (1843–1906) American civil engineer, and railroad executive

== Places ==
=== United States ===
- Fort Mifflin in Philadelphia, Pennsylvania
- Mifflin, Indiana
- Mifflin, Ohio
- Mifflin Township, Pike County, Ohio
- Mifflin, Pennsylvania
- Mifflin County, Pennsylvania
- Mifflin Cross Roads in Beaver Township, Pennsylvania
- Mifflin, Tennessee
- Mifflin, West Virginia
- Mifflin, Wisconsin
  - Mifflin (community), Wisconsin, an unincorporated community
- Mifflin Township (disambiguation)

== School districts and schools ==
- Governor Mifflin School District in Berks County, Pennsylvania
- Mifflin County School District in Mifflin County, Pennsylvania
- Mifflin County High School in Lewistown, Pennsylvania
- Mifflin High School in Columbus, Ohio
- Mifflin-Juniata Career and Technology Center in Lewistown, Pennsylvania
- Thomas Mifflin School in Philadelphia, Pennsylvania
- West Mifflin Area High School in West Mifflin, Pennsylvania

== Other uses ==
- B. Mifflin Hood Brick Company (1916–1946) manufacturing company in Atlanta, Georgia
- B. Mifflin Hood Brick Company Building, historic building in Atlanta, Georgia
- Dunder Mifflin, a fictional Northeastern American paper company
- Houghton Mifflin Harcourt, as a (historical) reference to the publishers
- Mifflin County Airport in Reedsville, Pennsylvania
- Mifflin County Courthouse in Lewistown, Pennsylvania
- Mifflin-Marim Agricultural Complex, historic home in Dover, Delaware
- Mifflin Street Block Party, a large block party held annually in Madison, Wisconsin
- Siege of Fort Mifflin, military action in the American Revolutionary War
- USS Mifflin (1944–1946), United States Navy Haskell-class attack transport

== See also ==
- Mifflin Township, Pennsylvania (disambiguation)
