= La Fete de Marquette =

Annual festival in Madison, Wisconsin

La Fête de Marquette is an annual summer festival in Madison, Wisconsin.

== History ==
The French-themed festival began in 2006. It is currently held at McPike Park on the east-side of Madison. The festival was canceled in 2020 and 2021, due to the COVID-19 pandemic.

== Events ==
The four-day festival features local and national musical acts, as well as restaurant and craft beer offerings.

=== Music ===
While many of the "Fête's" featured musicians are French-influenced, Musique Électronique, the festival's electronic music stage, has hosted numerous renowned DJs from across the world.

=== Notable past acts ===
- Kid Koala
- Kevin Saunderson
- Sonny Landreth
- Dumpstaphunk
- Dengue Fever
- Charanjit Singh
- Octo Octa
- Big Sam
- Sunny Jain
- Ten Strings and a Goat Skin

== Attendance ==
Over 40,000 were expected for the 2018 gathering, up from 30,000 in 2013.

== Charity ==
Proceeds from the free-to-attend event go to the local Wil-Mar Neighborhood Community Center. Since its inception in 2006, the festival has raised over $1.2 million for various neighborhood social programs.

== See also ==
- Art Fair on the Square
- Mifflin Street Block Party
- State Street Halloween Party
- Great Midwest Marijuana Harvest Festival
- Brat Fest
