= Cannabis in Wisconsin =

The current legal status of cannabis in Wisconsin is uniquely transitory, in a semi-legal grey state. At the state level, the possession, distribution, and manufacturing of THC (defined as any product that contains over 0.3% Delta-9 THC) is de jure illegal for both medical and recreational use unless prescribed by a licensed medical professional or other qualified professional.

CBD products are legal. The enforcement of state law is uneven due to a patchwork mixture of local ordinance decriminalization and the legal gray area referred to as the "hemp-derived THC loophole", which allows products less than 0.3% Delta-9 THC with similar effects (such as THC-A, concentrated Delta-9, and Delta-8 products) to be sold legally in the state.

In the 2023 State v. Moore case, the Wisconsin Supreme Court upheld in a 4-3 decision that the odor of cannabis guarantees probable cause for a police search.

== Industrial hemp ==
Industrial hemp was grown experimentally in Wisconsin as early as 1908 on state farms under the direction of the Wisconsin Agricultural Experiment Station. By 1917 there were 7,000 acres dedicated to hemp farming in the state, and by the 1940s Wisconsin led the nation in industrial hemp production.

The Rens Hemp Company of Brandon, Wisconsin, closed in 1958, was the last legal hemp producer in the U.S. following World War II. Prior to its 1958 shutdown, Rens had been the primary provider of hemp rope for the United States Navy.

In November 2017, Governor Scott Walker signed a law legalizing the cultivation of industrial hemp (containing under 0.3% THC), following unanimous passage of the bill in the Wisconsin legislature.

=== Hemp-derived THC loophole (2018) ===
In 2018, the Farm Bill was passed at the federal level. This bill legalized hemp and its derivatives as long as they contain less than 0.3% Delta-9 THC by dry weight. Because the law did not specifically address other intoxicating cannabinoids found in hemp, such as Delta-8 THC and THC-A, these products are being sold legally in the state. They are commonly available in forms such as THC-A flower, edibles, beverages, and vape cartridges. This lack of specific state regulation has prompted concern from some lawmakers. As of late 2025, State Assembly member Lindee Brill made a proposal that would redefine hemp to include all psychoactive cannabinoids and effectively close this loophole. The proposal's future is uncertain, as Governor Tony Evers has historically vetoed legislation that he deemed to be piecemeal or restrictive, and he has consistently advocated for full recreational cannabis legalization. Following the passage of FY2026 Agriculture appropriations act (P.L. 119-37, Division B), which was enacted in November 2025, federal restrictions that effectively ban most intoxicating and synthetic hemp-derived THC products were passed and strict criminal enforcement of the hemp ban is set to begin December 11, 2026, putting an estimated 3,500 jobs, hundreds of small businesses and between $700 million-1 billion in annual revenue at risk of immediate elimination.

== Criminal prohibition ==
The 1939 legislation "161.275 Possession and use of marijuana; penalty" stated that the penalty for "growing, cultivating, mixing, compounding, having control of, preparing, possessing, using, prescribing, selling, administering or dispensing marijuana or hemp" would be no less than one year and no more than two years in the state prison. Currently, possession of any amount (first offense) is a misdemeanor, punishable by up to 6 months in prison and a $1,000 fine. Possession of any amount for a subsequent offense is a felony, punishable by up to 3.5 years in prison and a $10,000 fine, which is also the penalty for selling 200 grams (7 oz) or less making Wisconsin's cannabis Prohibition laws some of the most restrictive in the entire nation.

State law allows possession of less than 25 grams (9/10 oz) to be prosecuted as an ordinance violation at the municipal and county level, permitting those entities to issue a penalty of monetary forfeiture (fines) with no jail time if the amount specified by the ordinance is received. In practice, numerous counties and municipalities have such ordinances but a majority across the state still do not.

== Reform efforts ==
=== State level ===
==== CBD oil legalization (2014, 2017) ====
In April 2014, Wisconsin Act 267 (2013 Assembly Bill 726) was enacted. The legislation nominally legalized the use of cannabidiol (CBD) in the state for treatment of seizure disorders. It was passed by a voice vote in the Assembly and a unanimous 33–0 vote in the Senate. It was renamed "Lydia's Law" by an act a month later in honor of a seven-year-old girl who suffered from a rare form of epilepsy; the girl's parents had pushed for CBD legislation in the state. The bill was criticized as being largely symbolic, as in order to gain support for passage in the Senate, its sponsors added a clause specifying that CBD oil must have FDA approval to be prescribed; prior to that clause the bill had support in the Assembly but was stalled in the Senate. Because CBD did not yet have FDA approval, and because a complex series of steps were required to allow trial usage, Wisconsin doctors were not allowed to prescribe CBD. As a result, CBD advocates stated that they could not find a doctor in Wisconsin willing to prescribe CBD. In mid-2015, state Sen. Van Wanggaard proposed an amendment to remove penalties for possession of CBD oil, negating prescription requirements, but the amendment still would not provide a legal way to create or obtain CBD oil.

In 2017, Governor Scott Walker signed into law a bill that amended Lydia's Law to legalize access to CBD oil for people whose doctors certify that the oil is used to treat a medical condition. Prior to that, access to CBD oil had been limited in Wisconsin. With the exception of one state senator, every other legislator in the Senate and Assembly voted for the bill.

In 2013 and 2015 state Representative Melissa Sargent (D-Madison) introduced bills to fully legalize cannabis in the state, with no success. In 2017 another such bill was introduced.

In February 2019, newly-elected governor Tony Evers announced that his upcoming budget would include a proposal to legalize the use of cannabis for medical purposes, decriminalize for any use possession of up to 25 grams (9/10 oz), and establish an expungement procedure for convictions involving less than 25 grams (9/10 oz). Evers has also previously spoken in support of legalizing the recreational use of cannabis, though this was not included in the proposal. Evers has since added the legalization of cannabis into every one of his budgets but each time Republicans have rejected and removed the proposal.

In February 2026, Democratic lawmakers introduced a bill to legalize both recreational and medical cannabis. The bill would establish a licensing system for hemp growers, processors, and retailers, regulate product testing and distribution, and create a pathway to vacating past cannabis-related convictions on individual's criminal record. Although there is support from Democrats and Independents. Majority Republican leadership indicated it would not take up the measure.

2026 analysis and advocates have suggested that other than strong and consistent Republican resistance, Wisconsin's powerful alcohol industry has contributed to resistance to cannabis legalization. Wisconsin's Public Radio reported that lobbying groups associated with the states beer industry have been cited as a possible factor in slowing legislation action on marijuana reform.

== Local decriminalization ==
=== Lower-level jurisdictions ===
As of 2025, it is common for local jurisdictions to have ordinances which lessen penalties or decriminalize possession of less than 25 or 28 grams of cannabis due to the state law provision allowing municipalities to do so. Madison, the state's capital and a historically progressive bastion, is one of the national pioneers in municipal decriminalization. Many cities and villages in the state of Wisconsin have references in their Peace and Good Order sections of municipal ordinances referencing possession of THC, usually issuing a fine (w/court costs) in lieu of any criminal prosecution. These ordinances apply at minimum on 1st offenses. Penalties vary by municipality, with some stricter ordinances issuing additional penalties such as suspension of a driver's license along with the fine, while the laxest ordinances issue no penalties for possession of 1 ounce or less in private or public areas where smoking cigarettes is allowed. Note also that while these types of ordinances are common, the practice is not consistent and some cities or villages do not have these provisions, relying on county or state-level resources for enforcement. In these cases, state law can then be applied, depending on if District Attorneys want to pursue those cases or not. Notable examples of municipal reforms are listed below.

==== Madison decriminalization (1977) ====
In April 1977, Madison voters approved a ballot measure to allow the possession of up to 112 grams (4 oz) of cannabis in a private area. For possession in public, offenders would be subject to a $109 fine unless used under the care of a doctor. The law was one of the earliest municipal decriminalization ordinances passed in the nation.

==== Milwaukee (1997) ====
In May 1997, Milwaukee Mayor John Norquist signed a bill to make the first-time possession of up to 25 grams (9/10 oz) of cannabis a non-criminal offense, punishable by a fine ranging from $250 to $500 or imprisonment of up to 20 days. The legislation also allowed offenders the option to perform community service or take drug education classes. In 2015 the penalty for possession of up to 25 grams (9/10 oz) was further reduced to a $50 fine.

==== Dane County (2014) ====
On April 1, 2014, residents of Dane County voted on a non-binding referendum to indicate whether or not state lawmakers should pass legislation to allow the recreational use of cannabis. The measure passed with 64.5% of the vote.

==== Eau Claire (2018) ====
In November 2018, Eau Claire city council members approved a resolution setting a $1 fine for first-time possession of up to 25 grams (9/10 oz) of cannabis (though with court costs included the total comes to $138). The resolution came a few weeks after voters in Eau Claire County approved a non-binding referendum expressing support for legalizing the recreational use of cannabis.

==== Madison legalization (2020) ====
In November 2020, Madison Common Council approved legislation to allow individuals 18 and older to possess up to 28 grams (1 oz) of cannabis and consume it in public and private places. Use within 1000 feet of a school, where tobacco smoking is prohibited, or without the consent of the property owner remain illegal under the law (reduced to a $1 fine). The ordinance passed with only one opposing vote.

==== Milwaukee County (2021) ====
In March 2021, the Milwaukee County Board of Supervisors voted 16–1 to reduce the penalty for possession of up to 25 grams (9/10 oz) of cannabis to $1 (not including court costs). Previously the fine was $275.

==== Oshkosh (2021) ====
In September 2021, the Oshkosh City Council voted 6-1 to lower the municipal fine for first offense possession of cannabis from $200 to $75.

==== Green Bay (2022) ====
In March 2022, Green Bay City Council voted unanimously to eliminate the fine for possessing up to 28 grams (1 oz) of cannabis so that only court costs would apply ($61). The fine for possession of paraphernalia was also similarly eliminated.

== Tribal law ==
=== Menominee Indian Reservation (2015) ===
In August 2015, members of the Menominee Indian Reservation (conterminous with Menominee County) voted 677 to 499 to legalize cannabis for recreational use and 899 to 275 to legalize cannabis for medical use. The Menominee are uniquely positioned in the state, as the only Indian reservation that falls solely under the jurisdiction of federal law (rather than under Wisconsin Public Law 280 like all other reservations in the state), meaning that the state of Wisconsin cannot prevent legal changes within the sovereign reservation.

== Advisory referendums ==
In November 2018, voters in eleven Wisconsin counties approved non-binding referendums expressing support for legalizing medical cannabis, and voters in six counties approved non-binding referendums expressing support for legalizing recreational cannabis. The support for medical cannabis ranged from 67.1% in Clark County to 88.5% in Kenosha County, while support for recreational cannabis ranged from 60.2% in Racine county to 76.4% in Dane County. The 16 counties that weighed in accounted for over half the state's population.

In November 2022, voters in three counties and five municipalities approved non-binding referendums expressing support for the legalization of recreational cannabis. The measures were approved in the counties of Dane, Eau Claire, and Milwaukee, and the municipalities of Appleton, Kenosha, Racine, Stevens Point, and Superior. Support ranged from 69% in Eau Claire County to 82% in Dane County.

== Public opinion ==
=== Medical use ===
In February 2025, a Marquette Law School Poll showed that 88% of Wisconsinites supported legalizing medical marijuana.

==== Recreational use ====
The same Marquette Law School Poll showed that 63% of Wisconsinites supported legalizing recreational marijuana.

== See also ==
- Legality of cannabis by U.S. jurisdiction
- Wisconsin NORML
- Great Midwest Marijuana Harvest Festival
- Ben Masel
