= The Club of Odd Volumes =

Private social club in Boston, Massachusetts

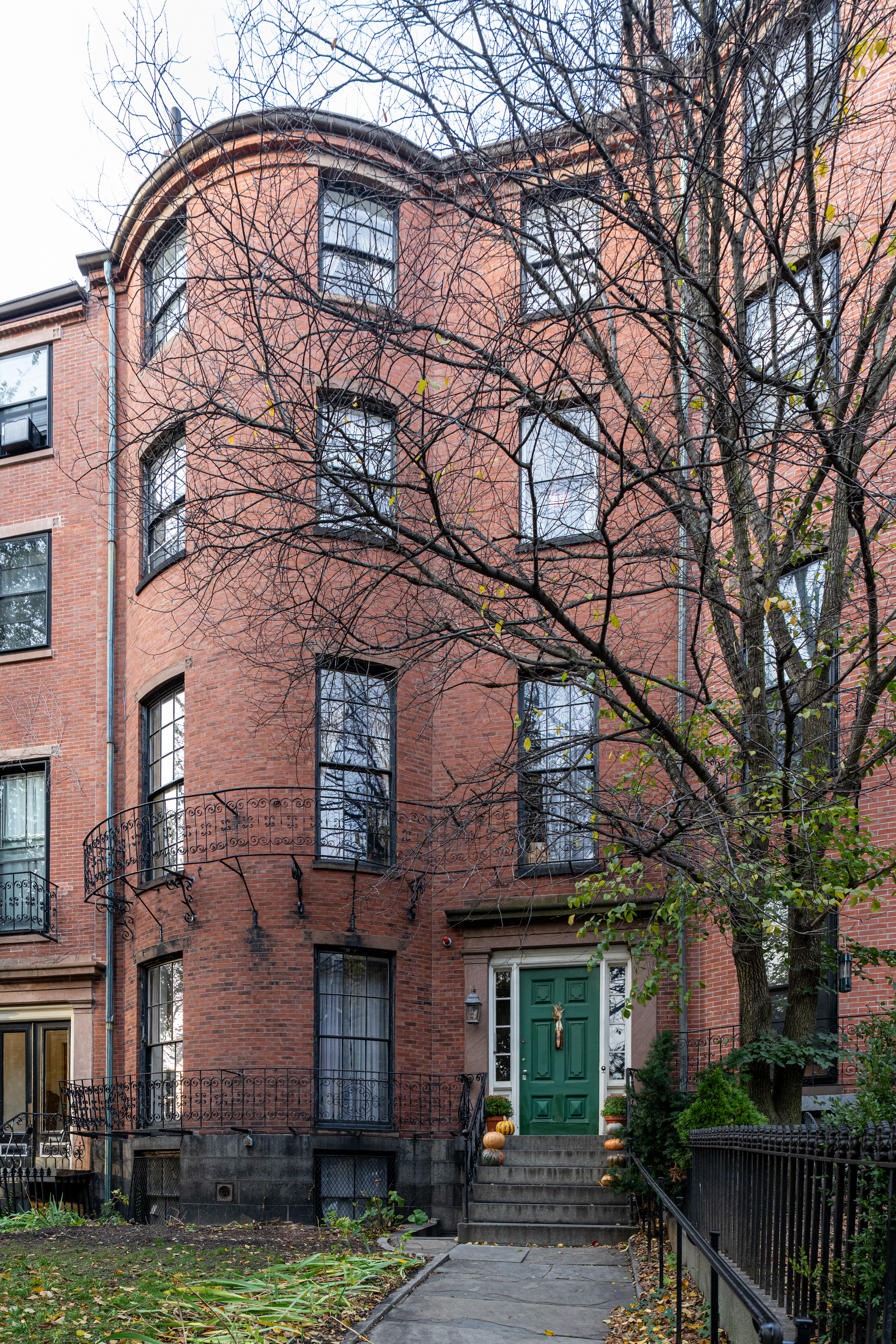
- 77 Mt. Vernon Street

- Location within Boston

General information
- Location: Beacon Hill, 77 Mt. Vernon Street, Boston, United States
- Coordinates: 42.358458°N 71.067054°W

The Club of Odd Volumes is a private social club and society of bibliophiles founded in 1887, in Boston, Massachusetts, USA. It does not accept women.

With a registered address in Wenham, Massachusetts, it operates under rules for 501(c)(7) Social and Recreation Clubs. In 2024, it claimed total revenue of $250,518 and total assets of $432,068.

== History ==
The club was founded on January 29, 1887, with the following intention:

The objects shall be to promote an interest in, and a love for whatever will tend to make literature attractive as given in the form of printed and illustrated volumes, to mutually assist in making researches and collections of first and rare editions, and to promote elegance in the production of Odd Volumes.

The 1888 published constitution of the club states that:

Its objects shall be, the promotion of Literary and Artistic tastes, the Study of the Arts as applied to Booke-Making, the establishment and maintenance of a Reference Library, and Exhibits of a special or instructive character.

The term odd is an eighteenth-century usage meaning various or unmatched. By extension, each member of the club is an odd volume.

The Sette of Odd Volumes, an English bibliophile dining-club founded in 1878, was the inspiration for the organization. George Clulow, President of the Sette of Odd Volumes, London, suggested the name The Club of Odd Volumes. (Note: The archives of the Sette of Odd Volumes are now at Cambridge University Library.)

The club began primarily as a dinner club, complementing established social clubs like the Somerset Club, Algonquin Club, Union Club, and Harvard Club. The group conducts lectures, meets regularly for dinners and lunches, collects and publishes books, and develops literary exhibits.

The club hosts authors, book designers, artists, politicians, printers, and people prominent in creative fields. H. G. Wells visited after a monthly dinner meeting in 1906. In January 1921 Harry Houdini gave a talk on Books on Magic and the Theater. Author Amy Lowell and actress Ada Dwyer Russell were guests of the Club in 1923, when Lowell gave a talk on John Keats. Winston Churchill was a guest at the Club, at a private luncheon, April 1949.

The club is controversial in the bibliographical and bibliophilic community, as it is one of only two remaining major book collecting clubs in the United States that exclude women. Women are regularly invited to lecture on their areas of expertise to the club but they cannot join the club.

== Building ==
The club has been at 77 Mt. Vernon Street in Beacon Hill since it purchased the building 1936. The building was the home of Sarah Wyman Whitman. Prior to 1936, it rented the buildings across the street at 50, 52 and 54 Mt. Vernon Street.

== Library and publications ==
Between its founding and 1900, the club expanded its membership and activities to include an active exhibition and publishing program as well as the maintenance of a library. Members in the Club of Odd Volumes, currently limited to a maximum of 87 (men only), are often associated with Boston's universities, museums and libraries. They often include rare and antiquarian book collectors, curators, scholars, printers and typophiles. The club continues to offer exhibitions on a wide variety of themes, including the printing arts, typography and antiquarian books.

The club has a substantial library of antiquarian books and an archive of letterpress printing.

The collection, only accessible by club members, has about 2,200 titles as of 2001. Most bibliophile clubs do not maintain a clubhouse and a library, with some other exceptions including the Grolier Club, the Rowfant Club of Cleveland and the Book Club of California.

== Publications ==
Internal publications

Representative examples of the Club’s yearbooks and bylaws

- Club of Odd Volumes (1889). Annual Exhibition.
- —— (1904). Constitution and By-laws with a List of the Officers and Members: April 1904.
- —— (1950). Historical sketch of the Club of Odd Volumes. OCLC 7914277.
- —— (1915). Year Book. s.n.
- Charles A. Rheault, ed. (2004). A Chronicle, 1987-2003.

Works of authors and poets

The following is a short selection of published works:

- Club of Odd Volumes (1895). Early American Poetry: Morrell, William New-England. Club of Odd Volumes.
- —— (1896). Early American Poetry: Mather Cotton. A poem and an elegy. Club of Odd Volumes.
- —— (1897). Tenth Anniversary Exhibition at the Boston Art Club, February 17-24, 1897. University Press.
- George Emery Littlefield; —— (1907). The early Massachusetts press, 1638-1711. The Club of Odd Volumes.
- George Parker Winship; —— (1909). William Caxton: A Paper Read at a Meeting of the Club of Odd Volumes. The Club of Odd Volumes.
- Charles Lemuel Nichols; —— (1912). Isaiah Thomas, printer, writer & collector: a paper read April 12, 1911, before the Club of Odd Volumes. With a bibliography of the books printed by Isaiah Thomas.
- Worthington Chauncey Ford; —— (1917). The Boston book market, 1679-1700. The Club of Odd volumes.
- Scinto, Leonard F. M. (2010). The Club of Odd Volumes Collects : An Exhibition of Members’ Collections at 77 Mt. Vernon St., Boston, Massachusetts, April 2010. The Club of Odd Volumes.
- Philp A. Mason; —— (2016). American bee books : an annotated bibliography of books on bees and beekeeping 1492 to 2010. The Club of Odd volumes. OCLC 964661107.

== Notable members ==
Notable members include

- Theodore L. de Vinne
- F. Holland Day
- William Addison Dwiggins
- Worthington C. Ford
- Edwin Davis French
- Wendell Garrett
- Frederic Goudy
- Curtis Guild Jr.
- Henry-Russell Hitchcock
- Henry Oscar Houghton
- Dard Hunter
- Alfred A. Knopf Sr.
- Frederick William Lehmann
- Arthur D. Little
- A. Lawrence Lowell
- Marcus A. McCorison
- George Harrison Mifflin
- J. P. Morgan
- J. P. Morgan, Jr.
- Robert Keating O'Neill
- Fred Ball Rice - Rice & Hutchins
- Bruce Rogers
- Franklin D. Roosevelt
- Rudolf Ruzicka
- Robert Gould Shaw II
- Daniel Berkeley Updike
- Walter Muir Whitehill
- George Parker Winship
- Thomas Randolph Adams

== Gallery ==
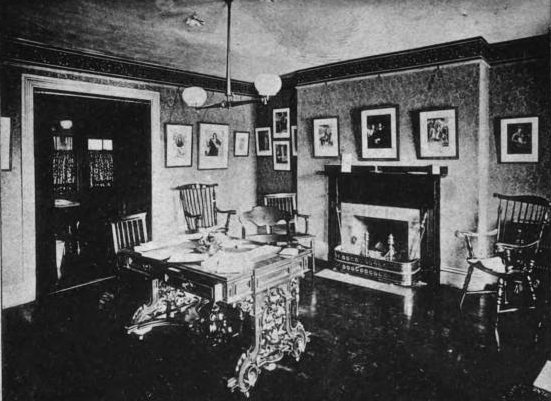
Exhibition at the Boston Art Club, 1889

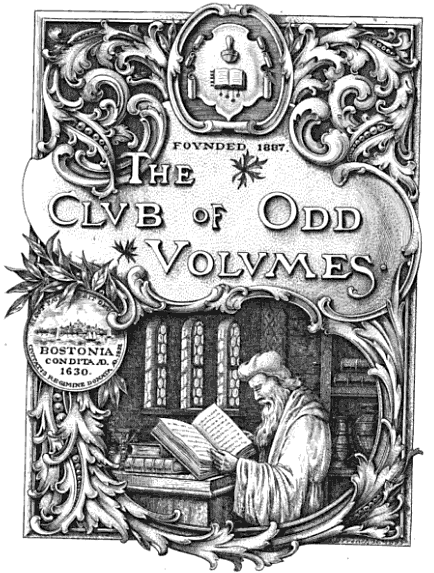
Bookplate, 1904

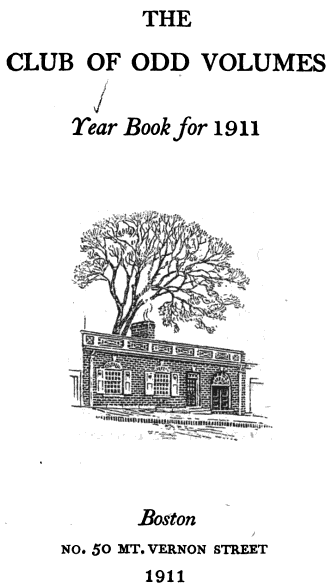
The Club of Odd Volumes, image of Mt. Vernon Street building, 1911

== See also ==
- List of American gentlemen's clubs
- Books in the United States
