= Mifflin Street Block Party =

Large block party held annually in Madison, Wisconsin

Coordinates: 43.0710°N 89.3918°W

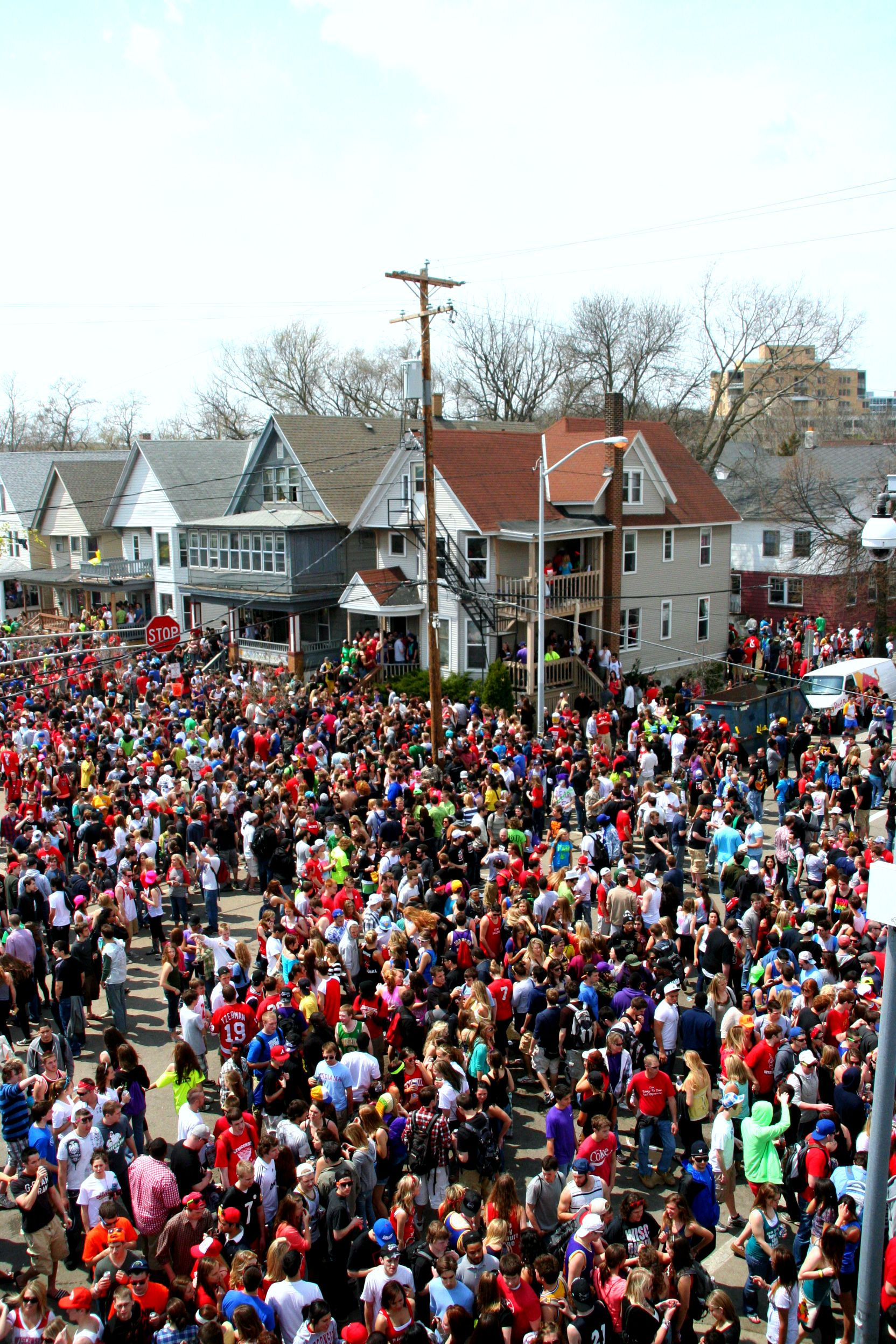
- Scene from the 2011 block party
- Nickname: Mifflin
- Date: Last Saturday in April
- Frequency: Annual
- Location: Mifflin Street
- Inaugurated: 1969
- Most recent: Saturday, April 25th 2026
- Participants: varies

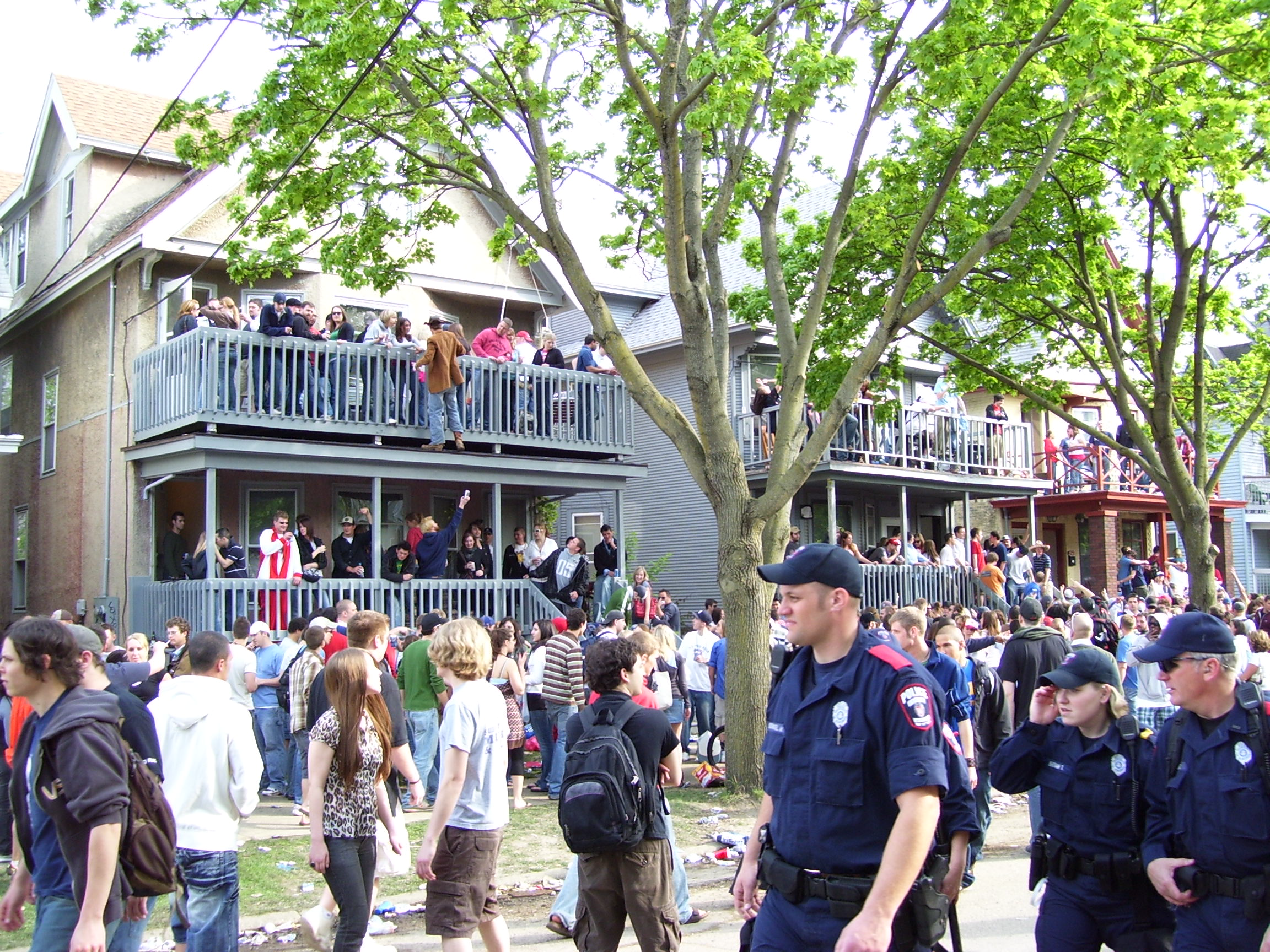
Revelers and police officers at the Mifflin Street Block Party in 2007

The Mifflin Street Block Party is an annual block party celebration held on Mifflin Street in Madison, Wisconsin. The party is held on the last Saturday of April and attended predominantly by students attending the University of Wisconsin–Madison. Originally a political protest, it has since become more focused on socializing and alcohol consumption before final exams.

The party has typically featured local and out-of-state musical acts playing on house porches, balconies and backyard stages. The party has not had city sponsorship since 2012. Efforts by the university and the city to create competing events have been unsuccessful. It is one of two large parties held in Madison, the other being the Freakfest Halloween party on State Street.

== History ==
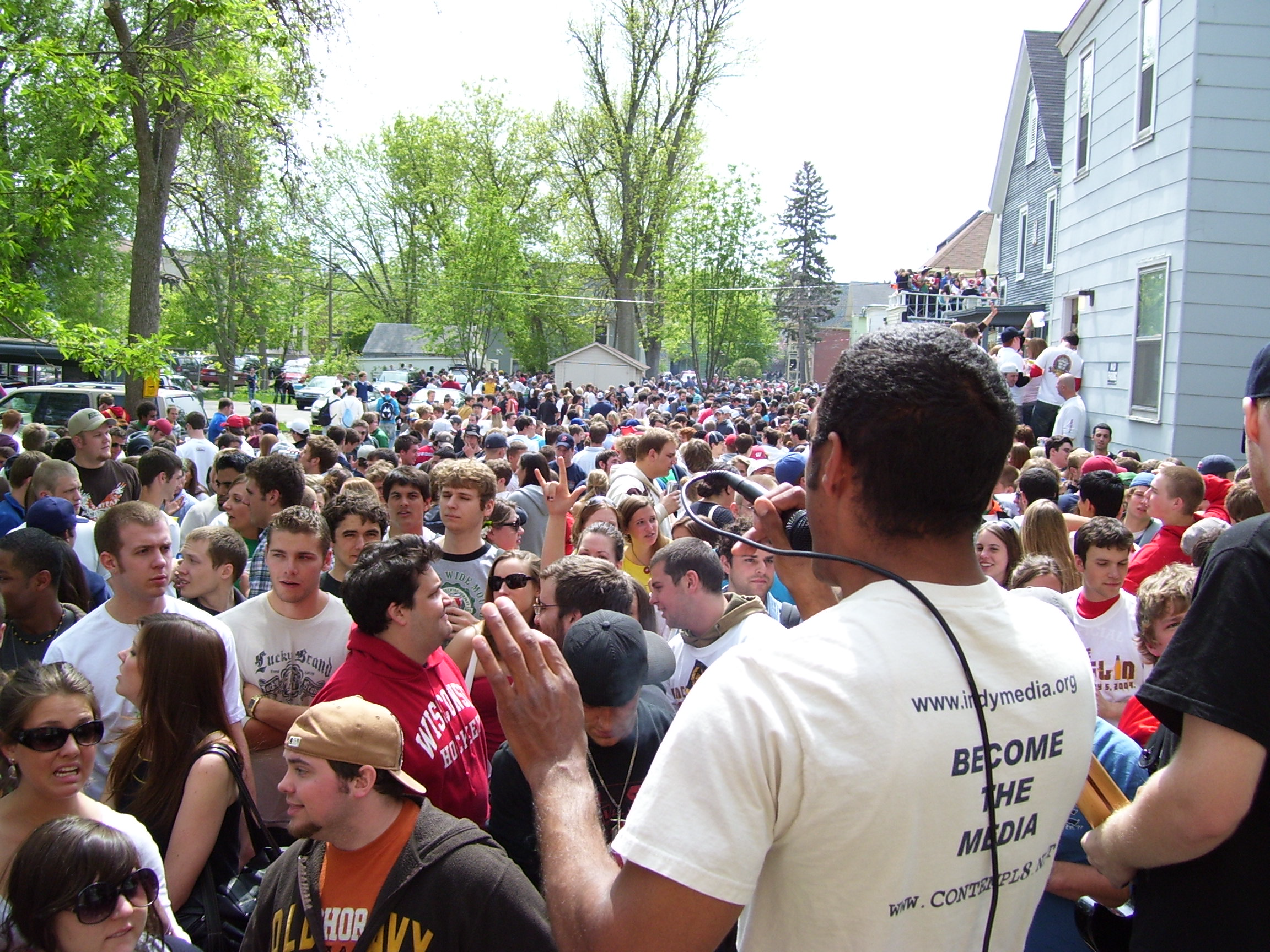
A poetry slam at the 2007 event

The Mifflin Street Block Party began in 1969 as a street protest, which involved dancing in protest against the Vietnam War. Its original date, May 3, was set to coincide with the one-year anniversary of the French student rebellion. Anti-war sentiments had accelerated in Madison since the 1967 Dow Chemical protest in which thousands of students occupied and were violently expelled from Ingraham Hall. The original event arose as part of a continuing conflict between students and police, centered on Mifflin Street. Police refused to allow permission for the street dance and when they entered the area in response to a noise complaint, a confrontation ensued that lasted three nights and spread into the surrounding student areas. Students threw stones at the police and constructed barricades to defend themselves. The police responded with tear gas and billy clubs. At the end, 70 people were injured and more than 100 arrested, including future mayor, Paul Soglin.

The event continued annually for the duration of the war, despite the effects of the nearby Sterling Hall bombing. In an attempt to control the event, the city created "Mifflin on the Mall" in 1979 with music and concessions on State Street Mall. By 1982, however, students had once again taken to Mifflin Street. Under sponsorship from the Mifflin Co-op, the block party was often used as a community fundraiser for various political or social causes. The co-op dropped its greater involvement in 1991 after the city requested that organizers keep alcohol within fenced-in beer gardens.

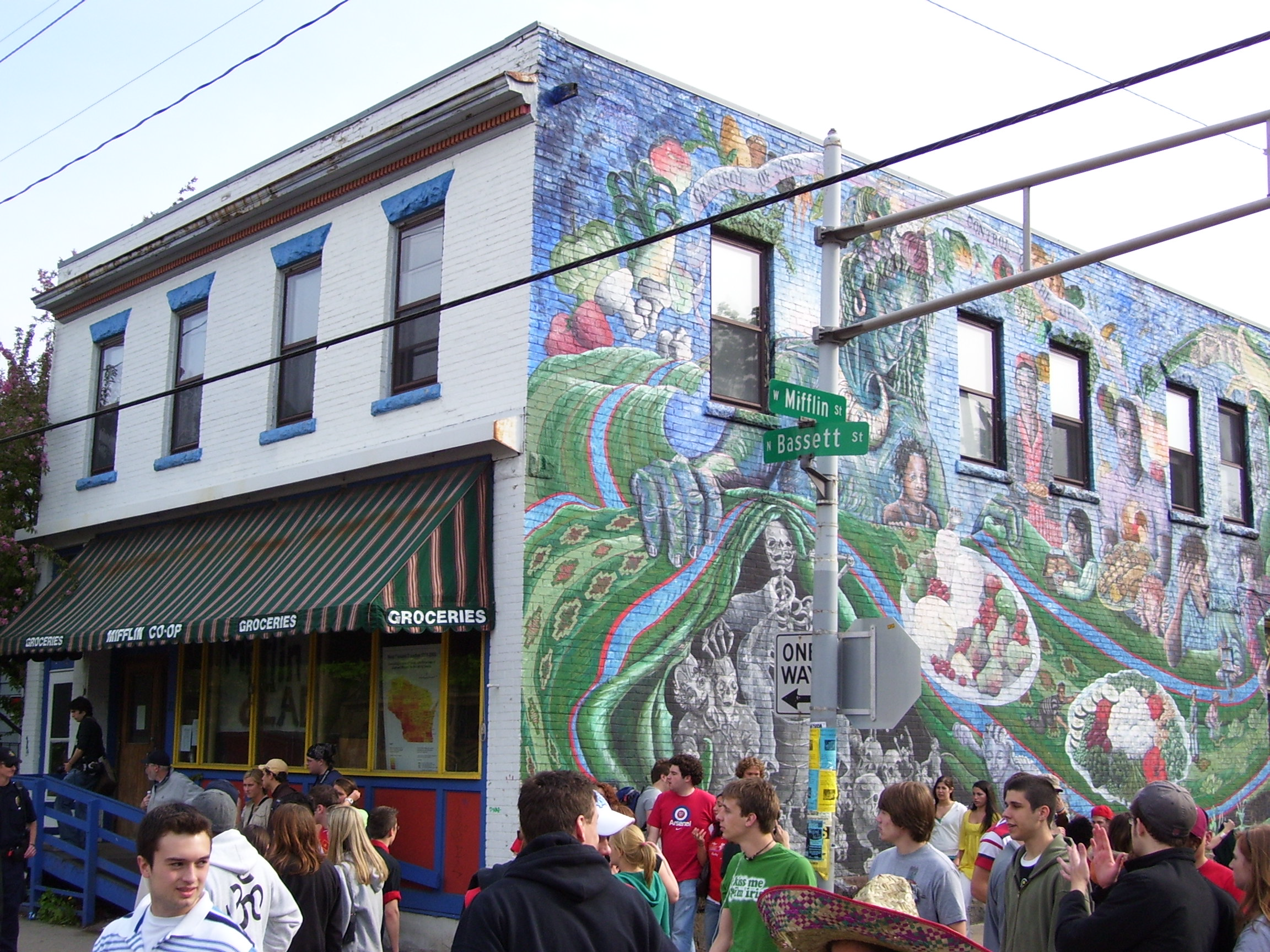
The Mifflin Co-op, during the 2007 block party

By 1990, police had decided to not have any officers patrol the event and removed any official presence from the party. Despite crowds in excess of 10,000 no major problems occurred until a riot in 1996. Following this event, the city and police took more control in planning. They now effectively dictate the terms of the party, spending in excess of $80,000 on policing.

On May 4, 1996, a riot broke out when a crowd of several thousand people threw bottles at a fire truck that had come to put out a bonfire started by the crowd to combat the cold weather. Police used riot gear to retake the block. The riots resulted in thousands of dollars of damage. The 1997 event was planned very carefully but attracted few people due to poor weather. No major riots have occurred since 1996.

=== 21st century ===
The block party occurred on the first Saturday of May every year until 2005 when students lobbied to have the date changed to the last Saturday in April to avoid conflicts with final exams. Mayor Dave Cieslewicz refused the date change at first, citing the additional cost and strain it would place on the police. After students vowed to throw a large celebration both weekends, the mayor agreed to move the date of the block party with a promise from student leaders that they would discourage celebrations in the first week in May. However, the mayor requested that the Associated Students of Madison pay for the additional costs of moving the date. The 2005 event was considered one of the calmest on record, with 225 arrests and 317 citations, including the arrest of the football team's running back, Booker Stanley. The block party was scheduled for Saturday, April 29 by city officials in 2006.

In 2009 the city allowed local promotional group DCNY Pro to officially sponsor the event. This would be the first time in over a decade the city had allowed a sponsor. With support from WSUM radio station they produced one live music stage at the intersection of Bassett and Mifflin street. This year attendance grew to 15,000 but arrests declined to 164. "Authorities credit official sponsors with the decrease in incidents. DCNY productions brought in a music stage, security staff, and food vendors."

In 2010, DCNY Pro once again sponsored the event partnering with WSUM Radio and Maximum Ink to produce two stages, one DJ stage at Bassett and Mifflin street and another Live music stage at Bedford and Mifflin street. The city also granted the sponsored a small beer garden in a parking lot on the 400 block of Mifflin street.

In 2011, open alcoholic beverages were allowed in the street for individuals of legal drinking age if they had a wristband. Madison police reported that this change was an attempt to bring people from backyards into the streets to allow for greater observation. The Majestic Theater, a local music venue, officially sponsored and hosted the event attempting to a put greater emphasis on music. Police officers reported the crowd size, and the number of significantly intoxicated people was far greater in 2011 likely due to the change in open intoxicants rules which resulted in more underaged drinking arrests. 160 people were arrested, two people were stabbed, and multiple police officers were injured during the 2011 event.

In 2012, Montee Ball, a Heisman Award candidate was cited for trespassing. Patrick Kane, a star forward for the Chicago Blackhawks, reportedly choked a woman at a house party and made anti-Semitic slurs. Photos surfaced of him drinking heavily, yelling at police officers, and passed out at a local bar. The party coincided with Cinco de Mayo celebrations throughout the country. This resulted in the event drawing the condemnation of UW-Madison Dean of Students Lori Berquam.

After months of speculation regarding the annual block party, the City of Madison released a statement officially cancelling the block party effective April 12, 2013, and warned of severe punishments for violators. The release also indicated that a student-created music festival was to be held the same day. However, three days after the apparent cancellation of the party, the City of Madison announced that it had not in fact cancelled the annual gathering, blaming the confusion on poor wording of the previously released statement.

Soglin had favored shutting the event down. Since he had attended the first one, this drew accusations of hypocrisy. At the 2012 event some attendees sold T-shirts mocking him, using the image of his face from the city's website with "Sorry for Partying" next to it. The photographer sued the T-shirt makers and their printer for copyright infringement since they had not sought permission to use the photo and he promised his subjects he would never let their photos be used negatively against them. At trial it was ruled to be fair use; the verdict was upheld on appeal by the United States Court of Appeals for the Seventh Circuit in 2014.

In 2018, the party was reportedly calmer and more orderly. There were anywhere from 15,000 to 18,000 attendees, more than 2016 and 2017 combined.

In 2020, the party was cancelled due to the COVID-19 pandemic. Police were seen patrolling the streets throughout the day. Houses that were playing music that was audible from the street were given a police warning to turn it off or else they would be in violation of a new city ordinance. The street was historically quiet for the day.

On April 25, 2021, thousands of students gathered for the block party despite the city's ongoing COVID-19 protocols. Despite the controversy, Madison police reported that only four people were ticketed during the event. However, a group of students vandalized a university staff member's vehicle.

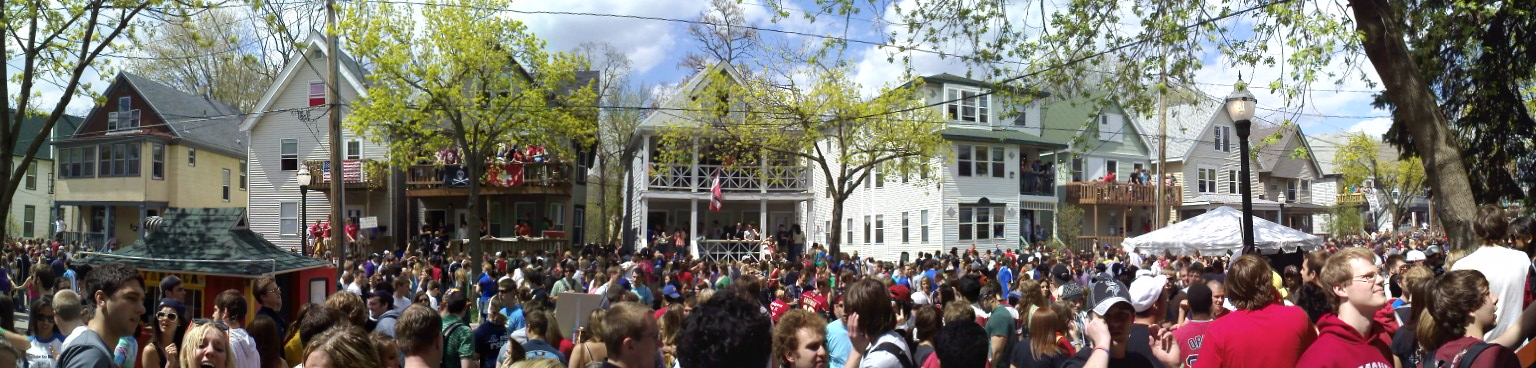
Panoramic view of the Mifflin Street Block Party in 2009

== Police control ==
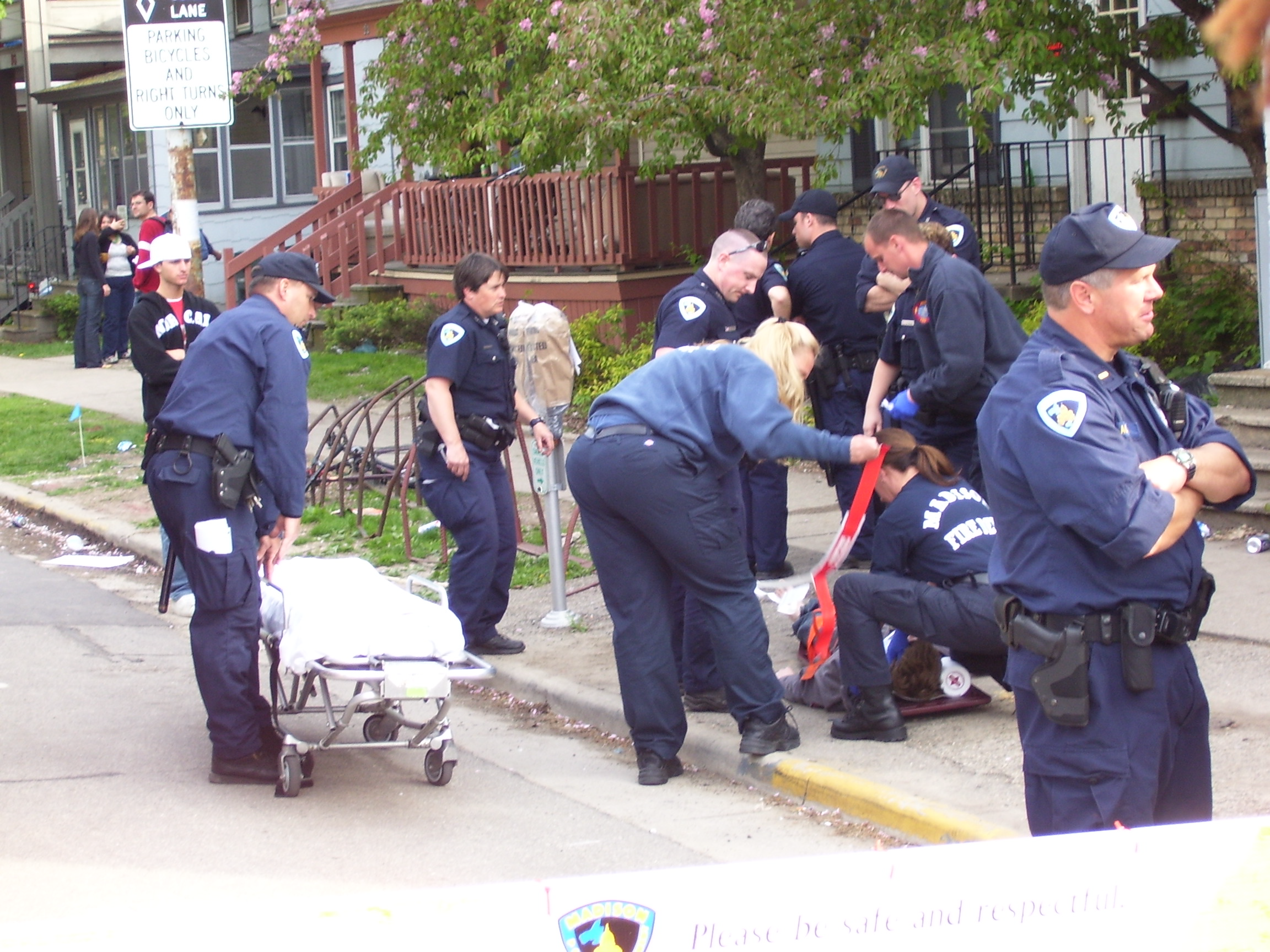
Madison paramedics load an unconscious partygoer onto a stretcher

Between 1998 and 2002, attendance ranged from several hundred to a couple thousand. In 2002, however, an unexpected 20,000 people showed up for the event. That same year, a riot during Madison's Halloween festivities prompted police to begin systematically clamping down on the Mifflin event. The city has consistently refused proposals by students to close the street and revive the block party under student control. A Madison police lieutenant was quoted as saying, "Quite frankly, we wish this event would go away." Since 2002, there have been an increased number of arrests and a decrease in attendance. The majority of arrests are for alcohol-related incidents.

Police have dealt with the event by heavily enforcing a number of ordinances. This has included the banning of glass containers on Mifflin, the limiting of the number of kegs that a house party can have, and the creation of a processing center for dealing with those arrested. Police are also notorious for handing out open container citations and targeting especially loud and raucous house parties. In 2004, one house received $25,000 in fines for "selling alcohol without a permit." In 2005, police arrested 225 people and issued 317 citations. The cost to the city was $100,600 and issued $85,000 in fines, most of which was dismissed or reduced.

The Madison Police Department reported 60 arrests in 2018, and most offenses were for consuming alcohol in the street, public urination, or carrying glass containers.

== See also ==
- La Fete de Marquette
- State Street Halloween Party
- Great Midwest Marijuana Harvest Festival
