= List of compositions by Faye-Ellen Silverman =

The following is a list of compositions by Faye-Ellen Silverman.

== Opera and musical theatre ==
- K. 1971 for narrators, tenor, bass, female chorus, chamber ensemble and electronic tape (1972); based on Kafka's The Trial, added texts from the Kafka Diaries, Balzac, and the Chinese poet Wen Yiduo.
- The Miracle of Nemirov, opera in 1 act (1974); libretto by the composer based on a short story by I. L. Peretz.
- A Free Pen, cantata for narrator, soprano, alto, tenor, bass, chorus (8 singers) and chamber ensemble (1990); libretto compiled by the composer from texts by Socrates, Spinoza, Zenger, and others

== Orchestra ==
- Madness for narrator and chamber orchestra (1972)
- Stirrings for chamber orchestra (1979)
- Winds and Sines for orchestra (1981)
- Adhesions for orchestra (1987)
- Candlelight for piano and orchestra (1988)
- Just For Fun for chamber orchestra (1994)
- Orchestral Tides for clarinet and chamber orchestra (2012/13)

== Large chamber ensemble ==
- Shadings for fl, ob, alto sax, bn, hn, tuba, 2 perc, vln, vla, cb (1978)
- No Strings for fl/picc, ob, bcl, bn, alto sax, hn, tpt, tb, tuba, and 1 perc (1982)
- Passing Fancies for picc/fl, ob, cl/bcl, bn, hn, tpt, tb, perc, 2 vln, vla, vc, cb (1985)
- Bridges in Time for tpt, perc, 4 vln, 2 vla, 2 vc, cb (1986)

== Brass ==
- Dialogue for horn and tuba (1976)
- Kalends for brass quintet (1981)
- Quantum Quintet for brass quintet (1982)
- Trysts for 2 trumpets (1982)
- Zigzags for tuba (1988)
- First Position for trombone and marimba (1992)
- At the Colour Café for brass choir (4 C tpts, 4 hns, 2 tb, bass tb, tuba, perc) (1997)
- Dialogue Continued for horn, trombone and tuba (2000)
- From Sorrow for trumpet, horn and bass trombone (2001)
- Triple Threat for 3 trumpets (2001)
- Alternating Currents for bass trombone and piano (2002)
- Double Threat for two trumpets (2002)
- Meetings for 2 euphoniums and 2 tubas (2003)
- Protected Sleep for horn and marimba (2006)
- Stories for Our Time for trumpet and piano, (2007)
- Edinboro Sonata for tuba and piano. (2009)
- Combined Efforts for euphonium, tuba, and piano. (2014)
- Custom-made Shades for trombone and piano (2015)

== Woodwinds ==
- Three Movements for Saxophone Alone for soprano saxophone (1971)
- Conversations for alto flute and clarinet (1975)
- Speaking Alone for flute (1976)
- Windscape for woodwind quintet (1977)
- Oboe–sthenics for oboe (1980)
- Layered Lament for English horn and electronic tape (1983); Tape realized at the University of Utah Electronic Music Studio.
- On Four for electronic valve instrument, oboe/English horn, and piano 4 hands (1983)
- Restless Winds for woodwind quintet (1986)
- Xenium for flute and piano (1992)
- Taming the Furies for solo flute (2003)
- Interval Untamed: Five Miniatures for alto saxophone (2010)
- Conversations Continued for alto flute and clarinet (2011)
- Tides for clarinet and piano (2011/13)
- Colored Tones for soprano saxophone. (2014)

== Strings ==
- Memories for viola (1974)
- String Quartet (Untitled) (1976)
- Speaking Together for violin and piano (1981)
- Volcanic Songs for harp (1983)
- Azure Skies for violin, cello and harp (1993)
- Duplex Variations violin and piano (1995)
- Paula’s Song for string quartet (1996)
- Obsessions for cello and piano (1999)
- Trial Balance for double bass (1999)
- Reconstructed Music for violin, cello and piano (2002)
- Translations for violin and cello (2004)
- Let's Play for string quartet (2007)
- A Brief Conversation for violin (2012)

== Chamber music ==
- For Him for flute, cello and vibraphone (1975)
- Yet for Him for flute, cello and piano (1980)
- Hollowed Refrains for oboe, violin and piano (1987)
- Unquiet Dreams for clarinet, violin and piano (1992)
- Connections for clarinet, cello and marimba (1994)
- Troubled Repose for flute, viola and double bass (1998)
- Shifting Colors for guitar, percussion, double bass, and piano (2012)

== Piano ==
- Settings for piano (1978)
- Gliffs for piano (1984); Influenced by the dance techniques of Pina Bausch.
- Two/Three (1996)
- Two Bagatelles (2007)
- Three/Four (2007)
- Fleeting Moments for piano (2011/12)

== Guitar ==
- 3 Guitars (1980)
- Processional for solo guitar (1996)
- Pregnant Pauses for guitar quartet (2005)
- The Mercurial Guitarist for solo guitar (2012)

== Percussion ==
- Three by Three for percussion trio (1979)
- Pas de Deux for marimba and piano (1991)
- Of Wood and Skins for percussion duo (2003)
- Memories and Alterations solo marimba (2008)

== Choral ==
- For Showing Truth for female chorus a cappella (1972, revised 1978); text by John Keats
- Hymn of Compassionate Love for soloists, choir, trumpet, timpani, and strings (2005); Biblical text: I Corintheans 13
- The Wings of Night for mezzo-soprano and baritone soloists, SATB choir, and guitar. (2008); Texts by Shakespeare, Teasdale, Dickinson, and Colborne-Veel, illustrate the contrasting aspects of night.

== Vocal ==
- In Shadow for soprano, guitar and clarinet (1972); texts by Emily Dickinson
- Echoes of Emily for alto and English horn (1979); texts by Emily Dickinson
- To Love? for bass-baritone and piano (1980); settings of an Elizabethan song and poems by Coventry Patmore and Ralph Waldo Emerson
- Journey Towards Oblivion for soprano, tenor and chamber ensemble (1991); based on texts by Christina Rossetti and D.H. Lawrence
- Mariana for mezzo-soprano, clarinet and piano (1995); text by Alfred Lord Tennyson
- Love Songs for soprano and flute/alto flute (1997) or mezzo-soprano and flute/alto flute (2005); texts by Sara Teasdale
- Wilde’s World for tenor, viola and guitar (2000); text: "To L.L." by Oscar Wilde
- Left Behind for horn and mezzo-soprano (2006); poetry by Edna St. Vincent Millay
- Manhattan Fixation for soprano, mezzo-soprano and cello (solo voices) or female chorus and cello (2008)
- Danish Delights for soprano and guitar (2009); Texts by Sara Teasdale, Corinna, and Thomas Campion.
