= Mifflin, Pennsylvania (disambiguation) =

Mifflin, Pennsylvania could refer to:

- Mifflin, Juniata County, Pennsylvania
- Mifflin County, Pennsylvania
- West Mifflin, Pennsylvania
- Mifflintown, Pennsylvania
- Mifflinville, Pennsylvania
- Mifflinburg, Pennsylvania

== See also ==
- Mifflin Township, Pennsylvania (disambiguation)
