= American Antiquarian Society =

Learned society and national research library

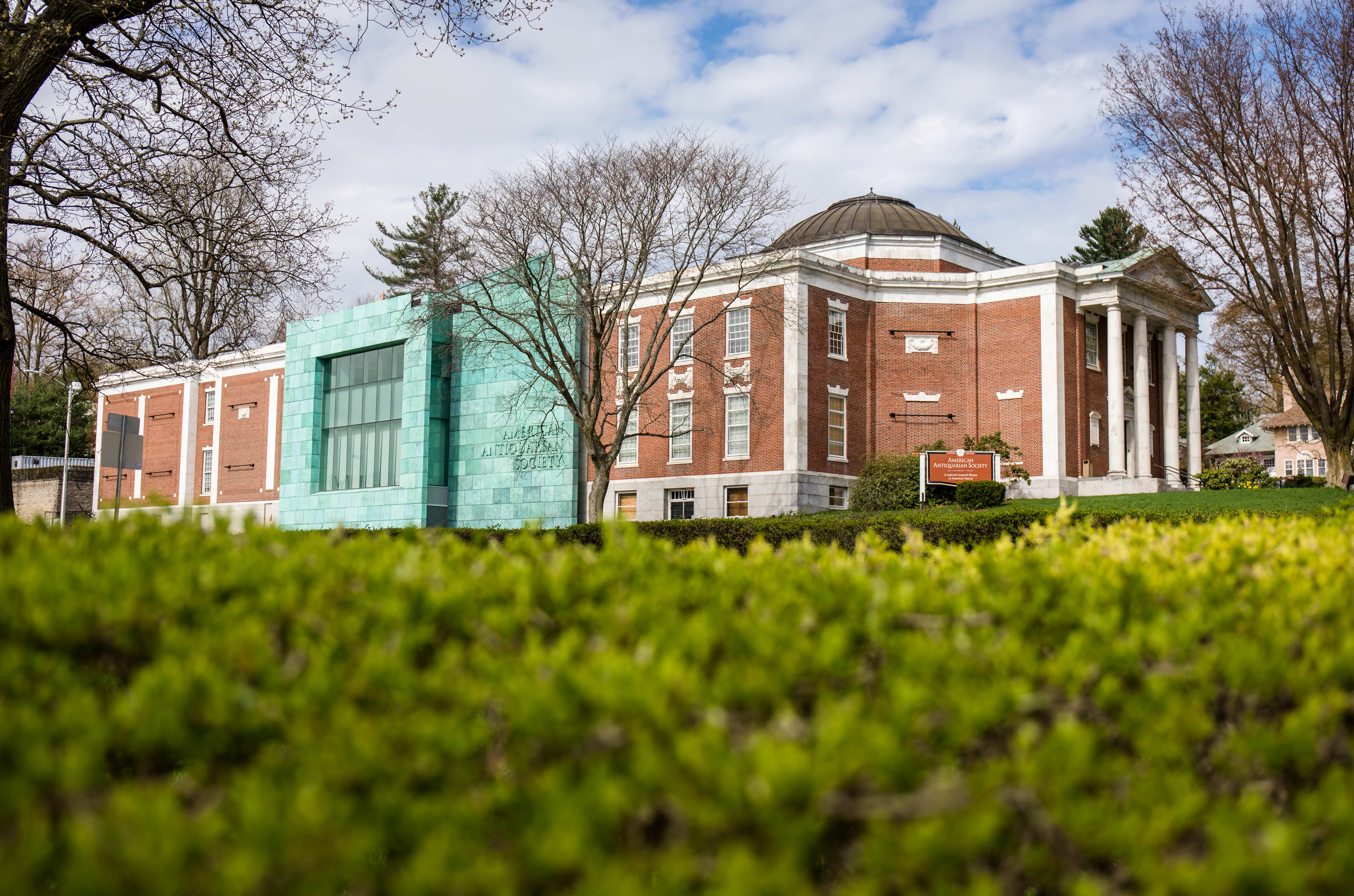
- View of Antiquarian Hall from the corner of Park Ave and Salisbury St.
- 42°16′38″N 71°48′39″W
- Location: 185 Salisbury Street, Worcester, Massachusetts, United States
- Type: Research library
- Established: 1812; 214 years ago
- Architects: Winslow, Bigelow & Wadsworth
- Branches: 1

Collection
- Size: 4.5 million

Access and use
- Members: 1,211 (Membership, 2024)

Other information
- Director: Scott E. Casper
- Employees: 45
- Website: americanantiquarian.org
- American Antiquarian Society
- U.S. National Register of Historic Places
- U.S. National Historic Landmark
- Location within Massachusetts Location within the United States
- Area: 1.8 acres (7,300 m^{2})
- Built: 1910
- Architectural style: Colonial Revival
- NRHP reference No.: 68000018

Significant dates
- Added to NRHP: November 24, 1968
- Designated NHL: November 24, 1968

The American Antiquarian Society (AAS), located in Worcester, Massachusetts, is a learned society and a national research library of pre-twentieth-century American history and culture. Founded in 1812, it is the oldest historical society in the United States with a national focus. Its main building, known as Antiquarian Hall, is a U.S. National Historic Landmark in recognition of this legacy. The mission of the AAS is to collect, preserve and make available for study all printed records of what is now known as the United States of America. This includes materials from the first European settlement through the year 1900.

The AAS offers programs on a wide variety of subjects including but not limited to Environmental History, Indigenous Peoples Studies, and American Religion for professional scholars, pre-collegiate, undergraduate and graduate students, educators, professional artists, writers, genealogists, and the general public.

The collections of the AAS contain over four million books, pamphlets, newspapers, periodicals, graphic arts materials and manuscripts. The Society is estimated to hold copies of two-thirds of the total books known to have been printed in what is now the United States from the establishment of the first press in 1640 through the year 1820; many of these volumes are exceedingly rare and a number of them are unique. Historic materials from all fifty U.S. states, most of Canada and the British West Indies are included in the AAS repository. An act of congress requires that one copy of the journals of the Senate and of the House of Representatives along with other documents are to be transmitted to the Governor of Massachusetts for the use and benefit of the Society. One of the more notable volumes held by the Society is a copy of the first book printed in America, the Bay Psalm Book. AAS has one of the largest collections of newspapers printed in America through 1876, with more than two million issues in its collection.

Its collections contain the first American women's magazine edited by a woman, The Humming Bird, or Herald of Taste. The collection also contains over 60,000 pieces of sheet music, over 300 games (including puzzles, board games, and cards), a large historical pottery collection, extensive New England diaries and personal papers, a diverse collection of photographs dating from the 1830s to the 1920s, and children's literature dating back to the 1650s.

== History ==
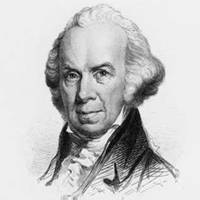
Isaiah Thomas, founder of the American Antiquarian Society

On the initiative of Isaiah Thomas, the AAS was founded on October 24, 1812, through an act of the Massachusetts General Court. It was the third historical society established in America, and the first to be national in its scope. Isaiah Thomas started the collection with approximately 8,000 books from his personal library. The first library building was erected in 1820 in downtown Worcester, Massachusetts. In 1853, the Society moved its collections to a larger building at the corner of Highland Street, also in Worcester. This building was later abandoned and another new building was constructed. Designed by Winslow, Bigelow & Wadsworth, the Georgian Revival building was completed in 1910 and stands on the corner of Park Avenue and Salisbury Street. There have been several additions to this building to accommodate the growing collection. The most recent addition was completed in 2019 and created room for an updated HVAC system, conservation lab, and multi-use learning lab. AAS was presented with the 2013 National Humanities Medal by President Obama in a ceremony at the White House.

== History of printing ==
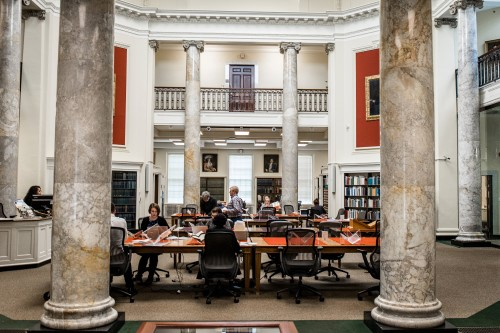
Interior view of the reading room at the American Antiquarian Society.

As part of AAS's mission as a learned society, it offers a variety of public lectures and seminars. One topic to which AAS dedicates significant academic energies is printing technology, especially in 18th century British North America. Since Isaiah Thomas was a newspaper man himself, he collected a large number of printed materials. With regard to printing, paper making, edition setting, and reprinting, not much had changed in European technology by the eighteenth century. It was not until the late eighteenth century that paper-making material began to evolve from a hand-woven cloth to an industrial pulp. AAS undertakes special efforts to preserve printed records from this time period, as the Society maintains an on-site conservation department with various sewing, cloth, and binding materials to aid in the preservation process.

== Publications ==
In 2000, Commonplace launched as Common-Place: The Journal of Early American Life, sponsored by the American Antiquarian Society and Omohundro Institute of Early American History and Culture, founded by editors Jane Kamensky and Jill Lepore, and designed by John McCoy.

== Past leaders ==
Over its two-hundred-year history, the Society has had 14 formal leaders who have shaped the organization's vision, collections, and day-to-day operations. Leadership roles at the AAS have historically overlapped in chronology, as different roles oversaw different aspects of the Society simultaneously.

AAS Leaders
Name	Dates of Leadership	Role	Occupation
Isaiah Thomas	1812–1831	President	Publisher
Christopher Columbus Baldwin	1831–1837	Librarian	Lawyer
Samuel Foster Haven	1838–1881	Librarian	Archaeologist/Anthropologist
Stephen Salisbury II	1854–1881	President	Landowner
Edmund Mills Barton	1883–1908	Librarian	Librarian
Stephen Salisbury III	1887–1905	President	Politician
Waldo Lincoln	1907–1927	President	Manufacturer
Clarence S. Brigham	1908–1959	Librarian/Director	Author/Bibliographer
Calvin Coolidge	1929–1933	President	Politician
R.W.G. Vail	1930–1939	Librarian	Librarian
Clifford K. Shipton	1939–1967	Director	Archivist/Historian
Marcus A. McCorison	1960–1992	Librarian/President	Rare Books Librarian
Ellen S. Dunlap	1992–2020	President	Librarian
Scott E. Casper	2020–present	President	Historian

== Notable members ==
The American Antiquarian Society's membership includes scholars, writers, journalists, historians, artists, filmmakers, collectors, American presidents, and civic leaders. Notable members include the following individuals:

- Benjamin Abbot
- John Adams
- John Quincy Adams
- Herman Vandenburg Ames
- Roald Amundsen
- Edward M. Augustus Jr.
- George Bancroft
- Alexander Graham Bell
- Ned Blackhawk
- Ken Burns
- Jimmy Carter
- Bruce Catton
- Harriette L. Chandler
- Ron Chernow
- Bill Clinton
- Calvin Coolidge
- Walter Cronkite
- Robert Darnton
- Charles Devens
- Theodore Frelinghuysen Dwight
- Edward Eggleston
- Drew Gilpin Faust
- Moses Fisk
- Esther Forbes
- Henry Louis Gates
- Doris Kearns Goodwin
- Annette Gordon-Reed
- Amanda Gorman
- Samuel Swett Green
- Ferdinand Rudolph Hassler
- Rutherford B. Hayes
- Thomas Wentworth Higginson
- Washington Irving
- Andrew Jackson
- John Jay
- Thomas Jefferson
- Tobias Lear
- Jill Lepore
- David McCullough
- Larry McMurtry
- James Madison
- Othniel Charles Marsh
- James Monroe
- Pedro II of Brazil
- Nathaniel Philbrick
- Dorothy B. Porter
- John Wesley Powell
- Carl Christian Rafn
- Franklin Pierce Rice
- Franklin D. Roosevelt
- Theodore Roosevelt
- George Dudley Seymour
- James H. Salisbury
- Thomas Winthrop Streeter Sr.
- William H. Taft
- Frederick Jackson Turner
- Bushrod Washington
- Woodrow Wilson
- Gordon S. Wood

== Awards ==
AAS was presented with the 2013 National Humanities Medal by President Obama in a ceremony at the White House.

== See also ==
- Books in the United States
- List of antiquarian societies
- List of historical societies in Massachusetts
- List of National Historic Landmarks in Massachusetts
- National Register of Historic Places listings in northwestern Worcester, Massachusetts
