= Weedstock =

Musical festival supporting cannabis

Front cover of newspaper advertising 1991 Weedstock

Weedstock was a cannabis rights music festival in the United States, originally held annually near Madison, Wisconsin from 1988 to 2001.

The festival was initiated and organized by Yippie and cannabis activist Ben Masel, and was held for fourteen years despite repeated incidents of attempted police interference.

Masel was a well-known cannabis activist. He ran for political office many times, including against Wisconsin incumbent governors and U.S. senators. He died in 2011.
