= Wisconsin NORML =

Political action group affiliate in Wisconsin

- Parent organization: National Organization for the Reform of Marijuana Laws (NORML)
- Website: www.winorml.org

Wisconsin NORML is the National Organization for the Reform of Marijuana Laws (NORML) affiliate for the U.S. state of Wisconsin. As of 2019, Alan Robinson serves as Executive Director of Wisconsin NORML.

== History ==
In the 1990s, Ben Masel was the organization's director. In 2010, Gary Storck served as president of Wisconsin NORML. The chapter has had several past executive directors / presidents, including Jason Galespie, Alan Robinson and Jay Selthofner.

Wisconsin NORML gave Governor Tony Evers a B+ rating.

== See also ==
- List of cannabis organizations
- Cannabis in Wisconsin
