= B. Mifflin Hood Brick Company =

Brick and tile maker in Georgia, US, 1916–1946

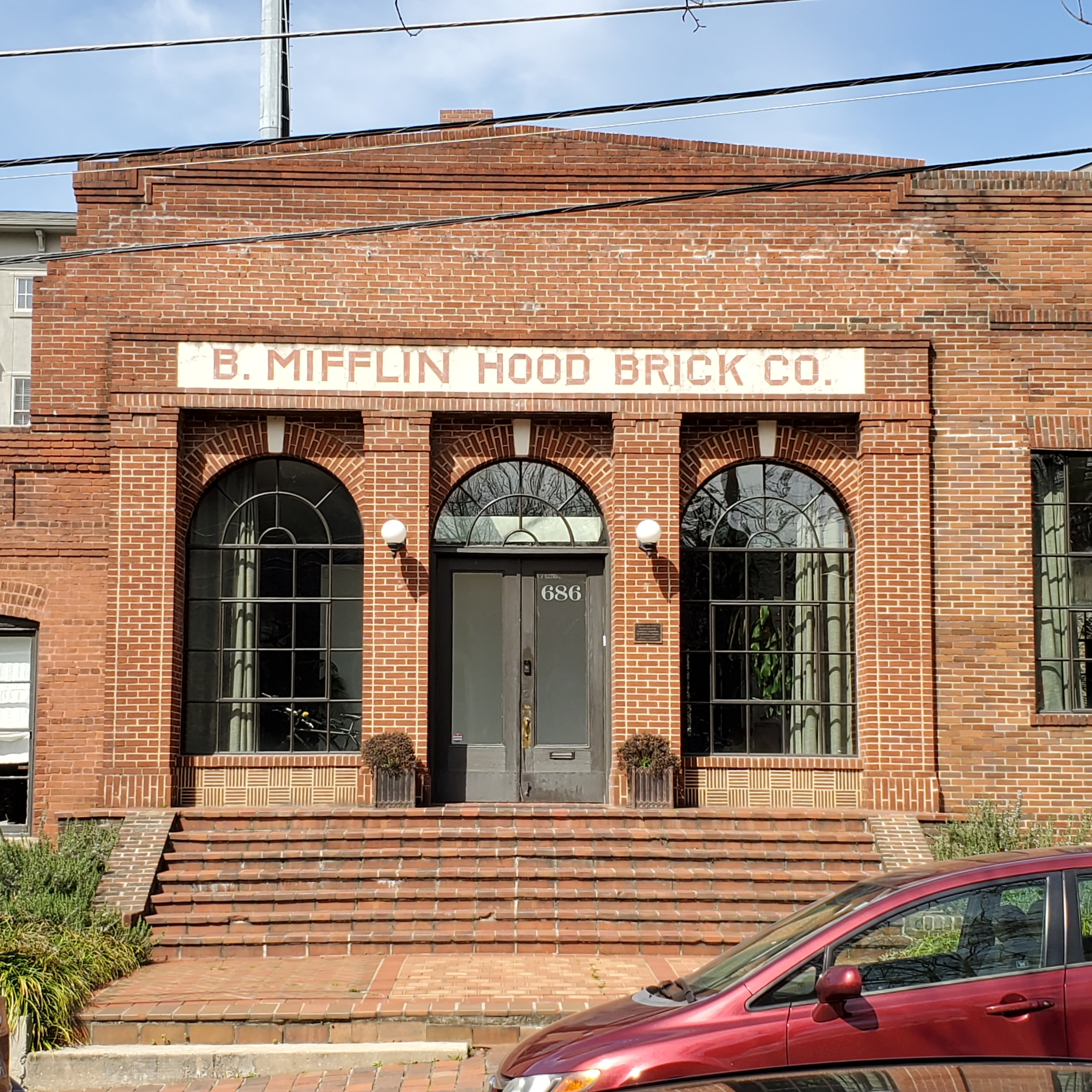
- Industry: Clay industry
- Founded: 1916
- Founder: B. Mifflin Hood
- Defunct: 1946
- Fate: Dissolved
- Headquarters: Atlanta, Georgia, U.S.

The B. Mifflin Hood Brick Company is a defunct American manufacturer of clay bricks and tiles that was based out of Atlanta, Georgia.

== History ==
The company was formed by and named after Benjamin Mifflin Hood, a ceramicist born in Cambridge, Maryland. Hood moved to the Atlanta area in 1904 and soon became involved in the brick manufacturing industry. Hood was appalled by the widespread use of convict leasing in Georgia's industries, and as early as 1905, signed his name on advertisements for bricks that encouraged customers to "buy free labor."

In 1916, he formally incorporated the company and constructed a factory to produce quarry tile. Shortly after this the company produced ceramic rings used for explosives manufacturing during World War I.

After the war's end the company grew and became a significant producer of clay roof tiles in addition to their brick and quarry tile. At its height, the company had Georgia plants in Adairsville, Rome, Calhoun, and Daisy, and North Carolina plants in Norwood. The company was a major proponent for the establishment of a school of ceramic engineering at Georgia Tech, which later was absorbed into the current School of Materials Science and Engineering.

Hood died in 1946, and despite its success, the company dissolved soon after.

== Legacy ==
The company's tiles and bricks were widely used through the American South and can be found on many structures.

Georgia Tech continues to retain a B. Mifflin Hood professorship position in honor of Hood and his contributions to the program.

The East Lake Golf Club's clubhouse was made with B. Mifflin Hood roof tiles in 1926, and when it was expanded in 2008, they were matched by Ludowici for the new addition.

B. Mifflin Hood's 1909 office building and showroom in Atlanta was added to the National Register of Historic Places in 2018.

== See also ==
- Ludowici Roof Tile
- Gladding, McBean
