= Zenger =

20th-century American underground newspaper

May 1993 Zenger masthead

Zenger was a 20th-century American underground newspaper that focused on corporate propaganda, government corruption, marijuana legalization and free speech. Zenger, billed as "The Nation's Underground Newspaper," was headquartered in Madison, Wisconsin. From 1987 to 1993, Zenger was published by Ben Masel and Jackson Clubb, who were leaders in the Yippie movement. Circulation 20,000.
