= Marcus A. McCorison =

American bibliographer (1926–2013)

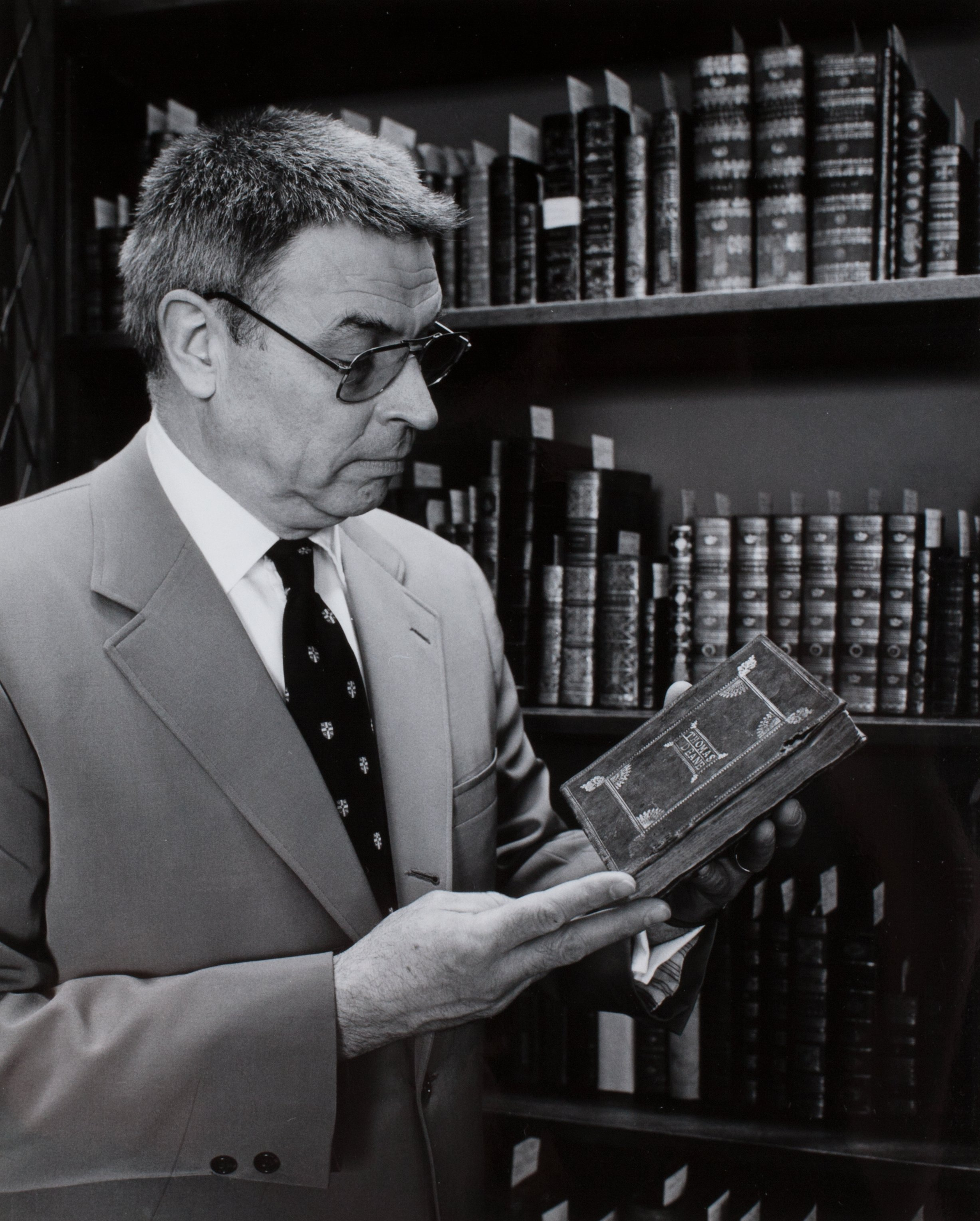
- Born: July 17, 1926
- Died: February 2, 2013 (aged 86)
- Occupations: Antiquarian, author, librarian
- Known for: President of the American Antiquarian Society

Marcus Allen McCorison (July 17, 1926 – February 2, 2013) was a bibliographer, librarian, and historian of American printing and book history. McCorison was President of the American Antiquarian Society from 1960 to 1992.

== Education and career ==
McCorison was born in Lancaster, Wisconsin, to Joseph Lyle McCorison Jr., and Ruth Mink McCorison.

He served with the United States Naval Reserve during World War II. He graduated from Ripon College in 1950 and earned master's degrees from the University of Vermont (1951) and Columbia University, School of Library Service (1954). His graduate study was interrupted by U.S. Army service as a first lieutenant in the Korean War in 1951–52.

His first professional position was at the Kellogg Hubbard Library in Montpelier, Vermont. In 1955 he became the chief of rare books at Dartmouth College.

McCorison was appointed librarian at the American Antiquarian Society in 1960. He was sometimes referred to as the “Grand Acquisitor,” as he expanded the Society's holdings by 115,000 items and provided access to the Society's collection with a machine-readable catalogue system. He established a fellowship program for visiting scholars. He grew the AAS endowment. The Wall Street Journal characterized him as tracking down rare books like a hungry wolf. He retired in 1992 and was named president emeritus.

== Awards and honors ==
McCorison was recognized with the Samuel Pepys Medal by the Ephemera Society (London) and with the Maurice Rickard Award by the Ephemera Society of America. He received the American Printing History Association.

He was elected to honorary membership in the Century Association, New-York Historical Society, Vermont Historical Society, and Zamarano Club. He received the distinguished alumnus award from both Ripon College and Columbia University's School of Library Service, and honorary degrees from Assumption College, Clark University, the College of the Holy Cross, and University of Vermont.

== Selected publications ==
- McCorison, Marcus A. (2012). Percy Grassby, 1882-1972 : An Outsider Inside Boston’s World of Print. First edition. Boston, Massachusetts: Society of Printers.
- McCorison, Marcus A. (2010). “Printers and the Law: The Trials of Publishing Obscene Libel in Early America.” The Papers of the Bibliographical Society of America 104: 181–217.
- McCorison, Marcus A. (2007). “Bibliography and the Book Trades: Studies in the Print Culture of Early New England." The Papers of the Bibliographical Society of America 101 (2): 221–25. https://doi.org/10.1086/pbsa.101.2.24293939.
- McCorison, Marcus A., and American Antiquarian Society. (2003). Risqué Literature Published in America before 1877. Worcester, Mass.
- McCorison, Marcus A. (2002). “The Passion of Abby Hemenway: Memory, Spirit, and the Making of History Deborah Pickman Clifford.” The Public Historian 24 (4): 182–84.
- Avery, Gillian, and Marcus A. McCorison. (2000). Origins and English Predecessors of the New England Primer. Worcester: American Antiquarian Society.
- McCorison, Marcus A., Michael Zinman, Keith Arbour, and American Antiquarian Society. (1997). Publishers’ Sample and Canvassing Books Issued prior to the Year 1877 : Compiled from Cataloguing Records of the American Antiquarian Society and from Canvassing Books, Sample Books, and Subscription Publishers’ Ephemera 1833-1951 in the Collection of Michael Zinman. [Worcester, Mass.]: [M.A. McCorison].
- McCorison, Marcus A. et al. (1993). Serendipity & Synergy : Collection Development, Access, and Research Opportunities at the American Antiquarian Society in the McCorison Era. Worcester: American Antiquarian Society.
- McCorison, Marcus A. (1991). “The Jayne Lecture. Humanists and Byte-Sized Bibliography. Or, How to Digest Expanding Sources of Information.” Proceedings of the American Philosophical Society 135.1 : 61–72.
- McCorison, Marcus A. (1991). “The Annals of American Bibliography, or Book History, Plain and Fancy.” Libraries & Culture 26.1: 14–23.
- McCorison, Marcus A. (1984). “Bibliography and Libraries at the Brink: A Jeremiad.” The Papers of the Bibliographical Society of America 78.2.: 127–136.
- McCorison, Marcus A. (1984). Vermont Papermaking, 1784 - 1820. Bennington, Vt.: Bennington Museum.
- McCorison, Marcus A. (1983). “The History of Printing from Its Beginning to 1930. The Subject Catalogue of the American Type Founders Company Library in the Columbia University Libraries.” The Papers of the Bibliographical Society of America 77 (1): 93–96. https://doi.org/10.1086/pbsa.77.1.24302886.
- McCorison, Marcus A. (1982). Clifford Kenyon Shipton : A Checklist of His Publications. [Boston]: The Colonial Society of Massachusetts.
- McCorison, Marcus A. (1981). Isaiah Thomas, the American Antiquarian Society and the Future. Worcester, Mass.: Reprinted from American Antiquarian Society. Proceedings of the American Antiquarian Society 91, part 1, 1981."
- McCorison, Marcus A., and Grolier Club. (1980). George Brinley, Americanist.
- McCorison, Marcus A. (1972). “Donald McKay Frost—A Collector of Western Americana.” The Western Historical Quarterly 3.1 (1972): 67–76.
- McCorison, Marcus A., Michael Papantonio, Hannah D. French, Nicolas Barker, Cornell University Libraries, University of Virginia Library, Pierpont Morgan Library, and Princeton University Library. (1972). Early American Bookbindings from the Collection of Michael Papantonio. Second edition. Worcester: American Antiquarian Society.
- McCorison, Marcus A., and American Antiquarian Society. (1972). Book Trade Labels at the American Antiquarian Society. Worcester, Mass.: The Society.
- Thomas, Isaiah, and Marcus A. McCorison. The History of Printing in America, with a Biography of Printers and an Account of Newspapers. Barre, Mass: Imprint Society, 1970.
- McCorison, Marcus A., ed.(1965). The 1764 Catalogue of the Redwood Library Company at Newport, Rhode Island. New Haven: Yale University Press.
- McCorison, Marcus Allen.(1961). “A Bibliography of Vermont Bibliography and Printing.” The Papers of the Bibliographical Society of America 55.1 (1961): 17–33.
