= Block party =

Community gathering in celebration

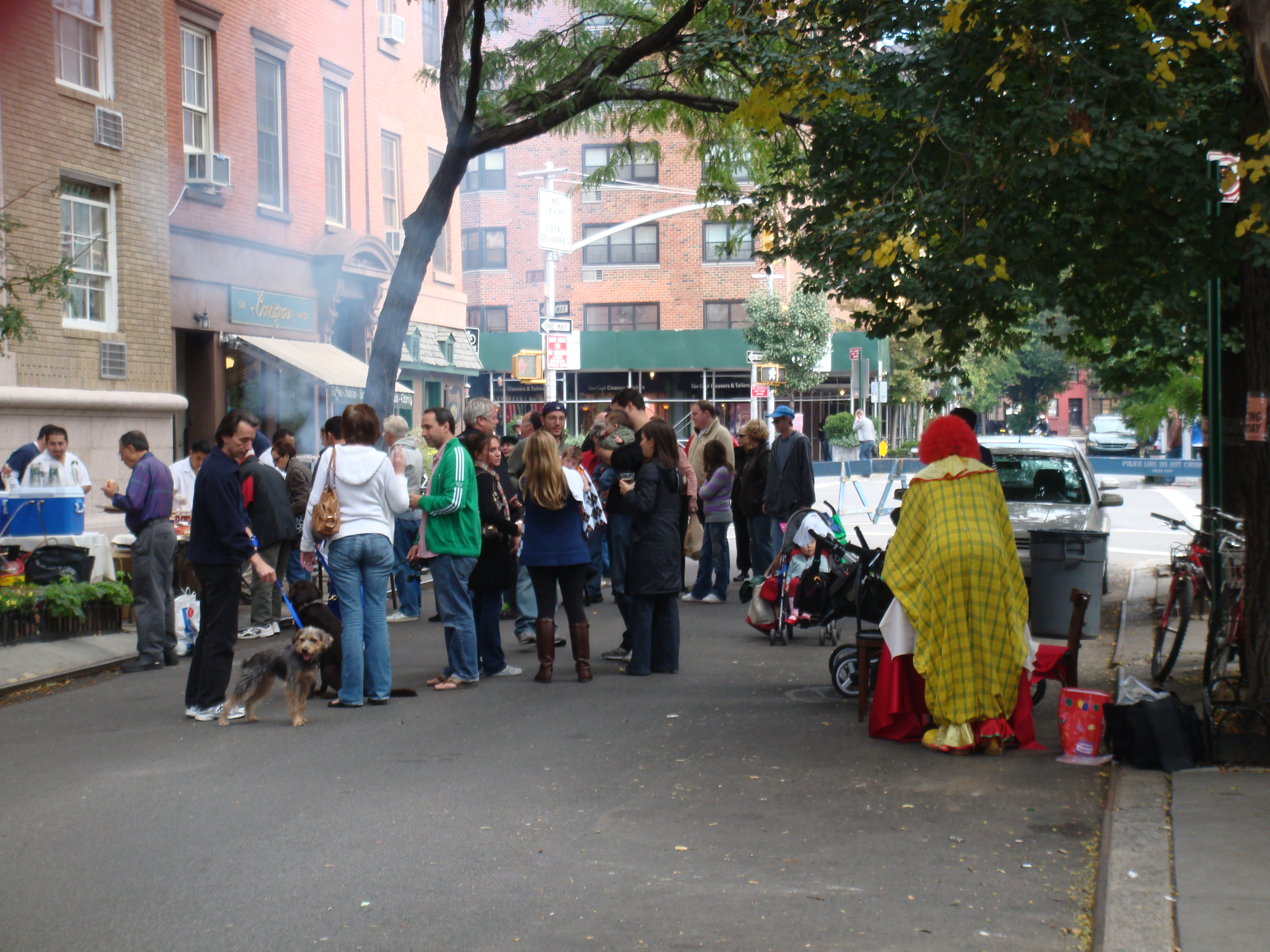
A block party on Jane Street west of Eighth Avenue in Manhattan in October 2008.

A block party or street party is a party in which many members of a single community congregate, either to observe an event of some importance or simply for mutual solidarity and enjoyment. The name comes from the form of the party, which often involves closing an entire city block to vehicle traffic or just a single street. Many times, there will be a celebration in the form of playing music, games, dance and activities with food such as popcorn machines and barbecues. When multiple streets become cordoned off, those are referred to as street fairs. These gatherings are especially popular during holidays or local celebrations and may range from informal get-togethers to large public events. The tradition has evolved globally, with local variations reflecting cultural, historical, and political contexts.

Block parties in many countries, particularly in urban areas, require permits and adherence to legal regulations such as street closures, noise control, public safety, and health guidelines.

As a form of activism street parties are festive and/or artistic efforts to reclaim roadways as public space by large groups of people. They were made known in Western Europe and North America by the actions of Reclaim the Streets, a widespread "dis-organization" dedicated to reclaiming public space from automobiles and consumerism.

== Global perspective ==
=== Poland ===
In the 1980s, under martial law in Poland, street gatherings that resembled block parties became a form of peaceful protest. The Orange Alternative, a surrealist art movement, organized theatrical events in public spaces as a way to challenge the Communist government's control over daily life. These events often included costumes and spontaneous celebrations, attracting large crowds and momentarily turning public streets into spaces for freedom and community. While not like the traditional block parties seen in the West, these performances captured the essence of communal gathering that is central to many block party traditions worldwide.

=== United Kingdom ===
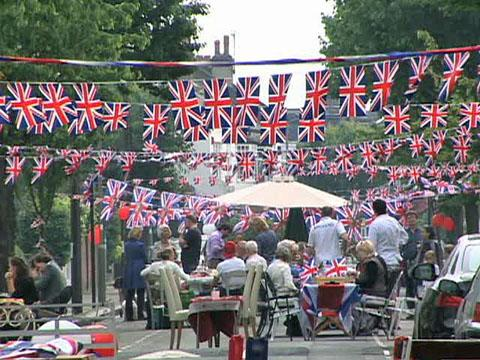
A street party in London for the wedding of Prince William and Kate Middleton

In the UK, 'street parties' are a British cultural tradition as private residents' events without wider neighbourhood publicity, especially in England and the south of Wales. They have historically been held in the summer to commemorate major national events, such as VE Day or for royal events such as jubilees, with bunting dressing the street, and children having fun in the street. An estimated 10 million people took part in street parties in 1977 for the Queen's Silver Jubilee.

The tradition seems to have begun in the United Kingdom after World War I as residents' organised "peace teas" to celebrate the signing of the Treaty of Versailles in 1919.

The tradition was boosted for the wedding of Prince William and Kate Middleton in April 2011 with about 1 million people joining in street parties. For the Queen's Diamond Jubilee in June 2012 about 2 million took part.

Some street parties are held annually or at any time for residents to meet their neighbours in a traffic-free street in a private street party. Some street parties are wider public events taking many forms with any social or cultural activity.

=== United States and Canada ===
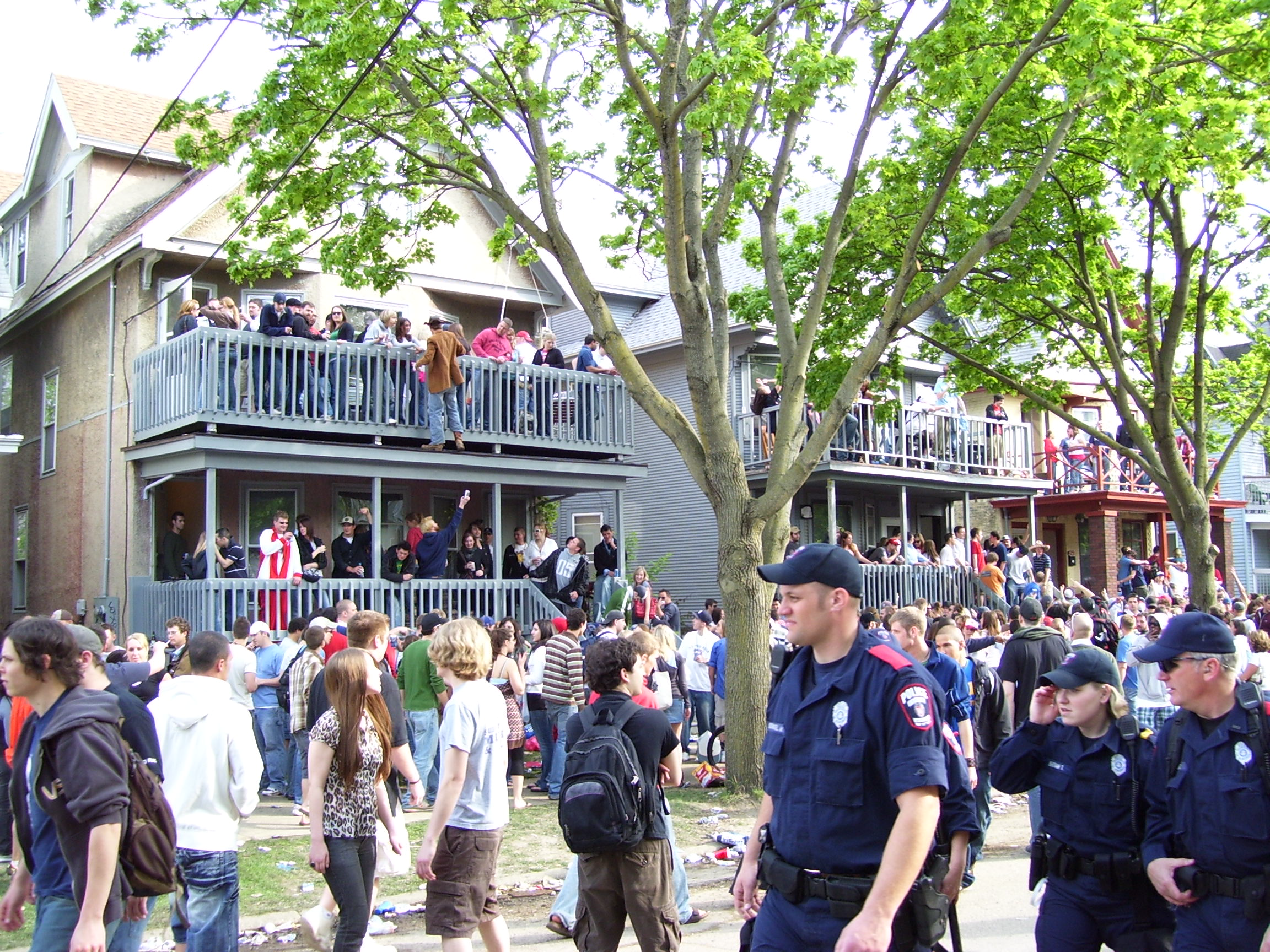
People at the Mifflin Street Block Party in Madison, Wisconsin in 2007

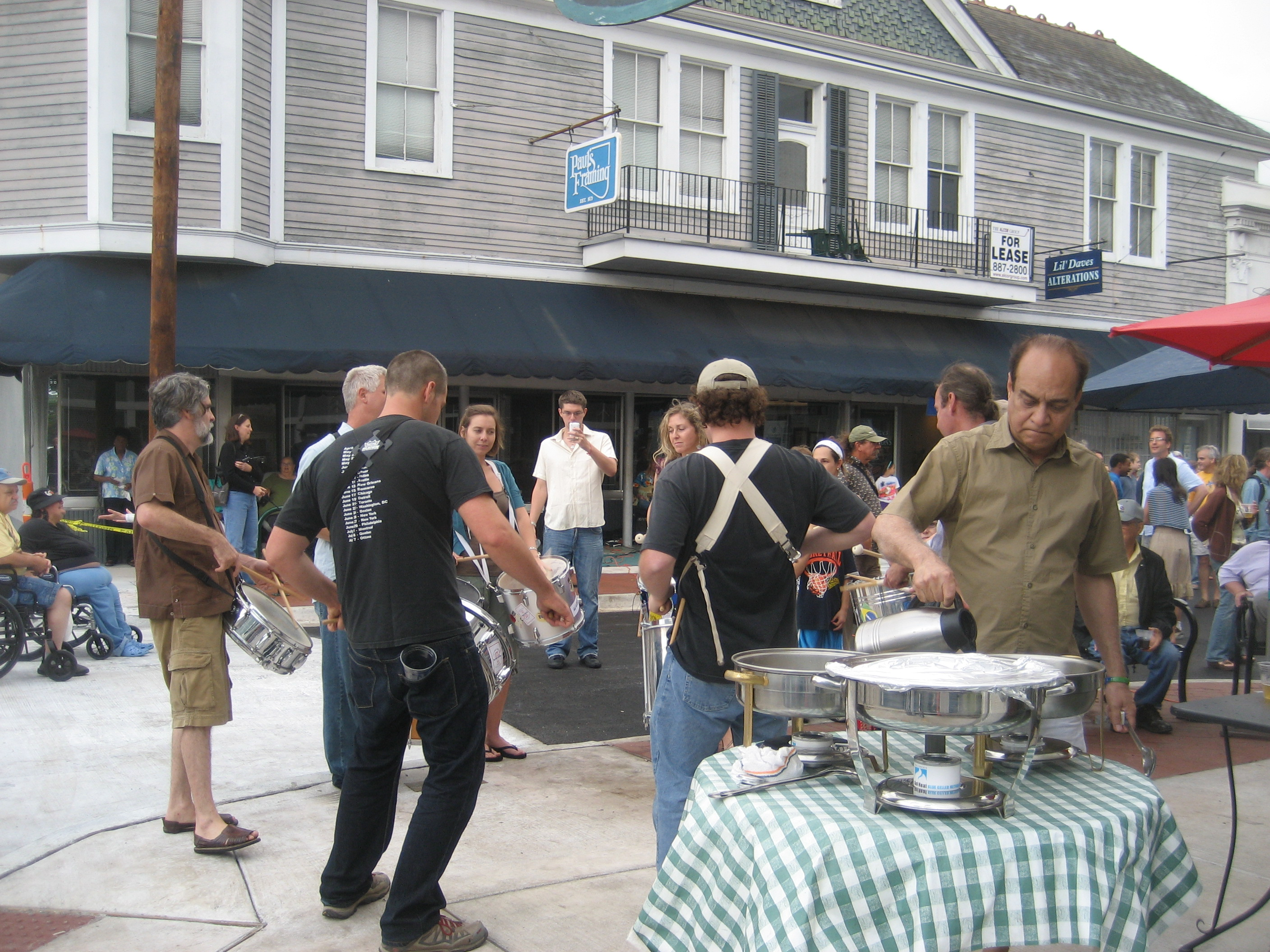
Musicians performing at a block party on Oak Street in New Orleans in 2009.

Block parties are popular in both the United States and Canada, and are reported as a World War I innovation originating from the East Side of New York City, where an entire block was insulated and patriotic songs sung, and a parade held to honor the members of that block who had gone off to war. Traditionally, many inner city block parties were actually held illegally, because they did not file for an event permit from the local authorities. However, police turned a blind eye to them.

In the United States, block parties usually occur on holidays such as Independence Day and Memorial Day. In Canada block parties are common on Canada Day and Victoria Day. Some towns may also have a yearly block party.

Block parties gained popularity in North America during the 1970s, particularly within the hip hop community in the United States. Block parties were usually outside on the street, and the DJs powered their sound systems using streetlights, as referenced in the song "South Bronx" by KRS-One. They became an integral part of urban North American life, fostering local identity and creating a sense of belonging among residents and within the neighborhood. These gatherings provided opportunities for residents to socialize, share food, and enjoy music in public spaces.

Sometimes, the occasion may be a theme, such as a recent popular film or "welcome to our town" for a new family. Often block parties involve barbecues and lawn games such as Simon says, karaoke, and group dancing such as the electric slide, the Macarena, or line dancing. In many small towns, local firefighters may also participate in the party, bringing out trucks that are displayed for show.

== Legal permits ==
Block parties, while often seen as informal neighborhood events, generally require legal permissions and compliance to local regulations, especially when held in public spaces. The requirements for permits and approvals vary by region, but key aspects of the permitting process include fees, alcohol permits, health and safety regulations, traffic control, noise control, and the actual permit application.

In many locations, organizing a block party requires submitting a formal application to local authorities, such as city or town councils. The application typically asks for details regarding the event, such as its location, duration, purpose, and expected number of attendees. Local governments review these details to ensure that the event complies with public safety and community regulations. A Permit may be required for various reasons, including road closures, noise control, and security measures. Authorities may also set specific conditions, such as the hours during which the event can occur or limits on the amount of space used.

== See also ==
- Banquet
- Botellon
- Demoparty
- LAN party
- Mifflin Street Block Party
- Notting Hill Carnival
- Street reclaiming
- Street storming
- Tactical frivolity
