= B. Mifflin Hood Brick Company Building =

- U.S. National Register of Historic Places
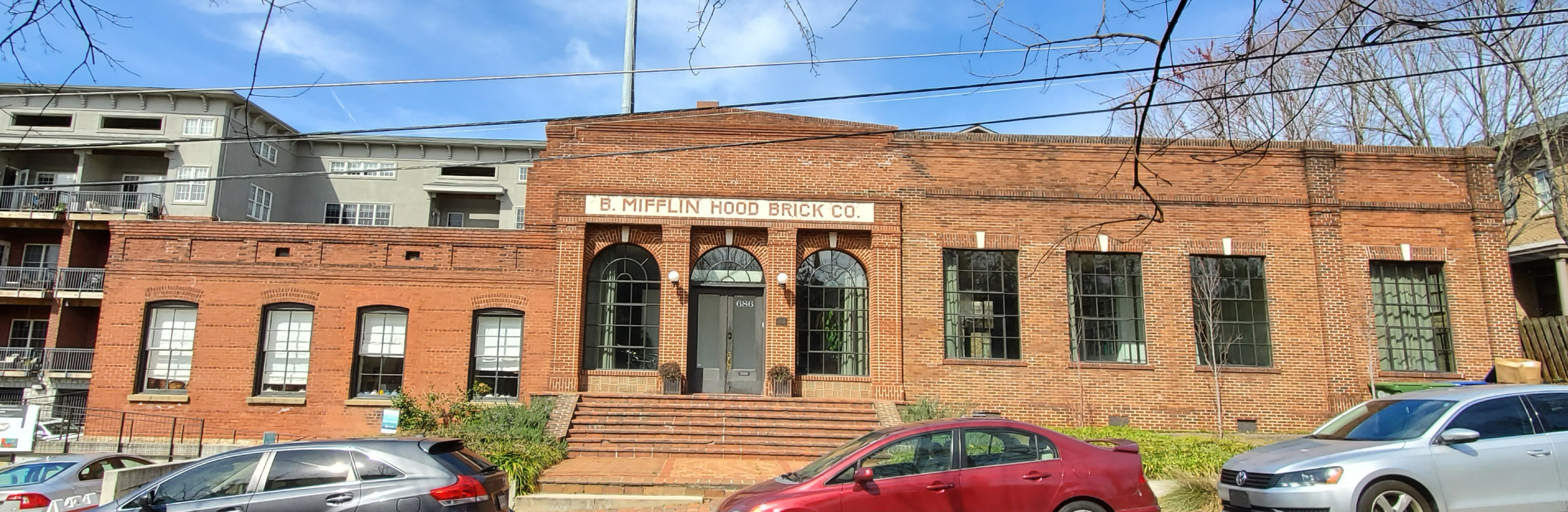
- B. Mifflin Hood Brick Company Building in 2020
- Location: 686 Greenwood Avenue NE; Atlanta, Georgia
- Built: 1909
- NRHP reference No.: 100003173
- Added to NRHP: December 6, 2018

The B. Mifflin Hood Brick Company Building is a historic building in Atlanta, Georgia. Located in the Virginia–Highland neighborhood, the building was built in 1909 and was added to the National Register of Historic Places in 2018.

== History ==
The building was constructed in 1909 to serve as a showroom and headquarters for the B. Mifflin Hood Brick Company. B. Mifflin Hood, a businessman who had moved to Atlanta from Philadelphia, founded the company in 1904 and distinguished his company from his competitors by marketing his products as "non-convict brick", as Hood did not participate in the convict leasing system that was prevalent in Georgia at this time. Hood also helped to improve the brick-making industry in the Southern United States by introducing new technological advancements and by founding a Ceramic Engineering Department at the Georgia School of Technology. In 1921, the building underwent a massive renovation project that tripled the area of the building. B. Mifflin Hood Brick Company continued to operate in the building until 1947. On December 6, 2018, the one-story, 11-bay building was added to the National Register of Historic Places. The building is located along the BeltLine.

== See also ==
- National Register of Historic Places listings in Fulton County, Georgia
