= Mifflin (surname) =

Mifflin is a surname. Notable people with the surname include:

- Fred Mifflin (1938–2013), retired Rear Admiral in the Canadian Forces and a former politician
- James Mifflin (1839–?), United States Navy sailor in the American Civil War
- Margot Mifflin, (born 1960), U.S. Author and professor
- Ramón Mifflin (born 1947), Peruvian footballer
- Thomas Mifflin (1744–1800), American merchant and politician from Philadelphia, Pennsylvania
- George Harrison Mifflin (1845–1921), American publisher, co-founder with Henry Oscar Houghton of Houghton Mifflin Company

== See also ==
- Mifflin (disambiguation)
