= Ben Masel =

American activist (1954–2011)

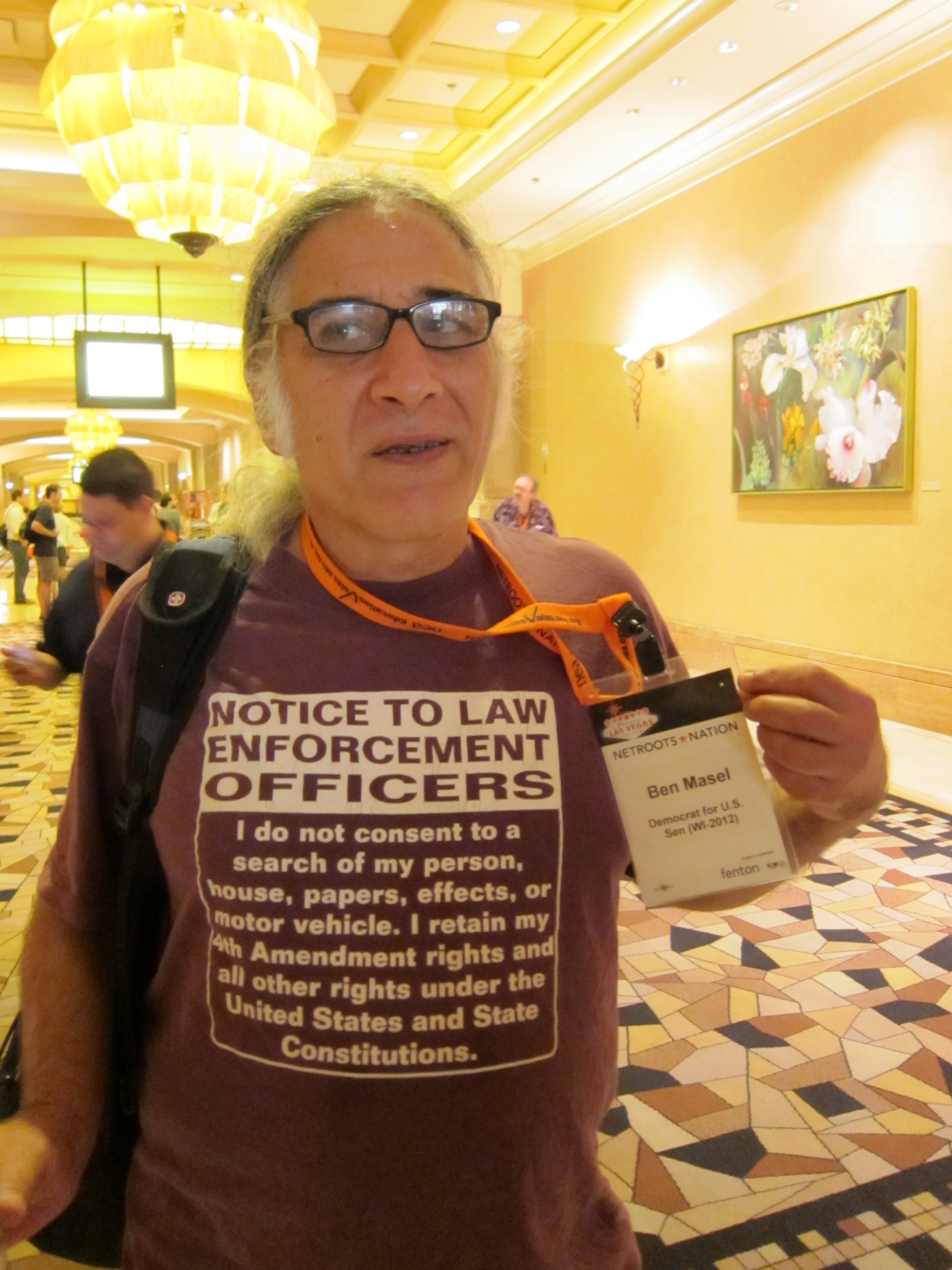
- Ben Masel at the Wisconsin Capitol in 2010
- Born: Bennett A. Masel; October 17, 1954; The Bronx, New York
- Died: April 30, 2011 (aged 56); Madison, Wisconsin
- Occupations: Publisher; First Amendment plaintiff
- Years active: 1968–2011
- Known for: Marijuana legalization; Free speech; Underground newspapers
- Children: Semilla Anderson

Bennett A. "Ben" Masel (October 17, 1954 – April 30, 2011) was an American writer, publisher, cannabis rights and free speech activist, expert witness for marijuana defendants, and frequent candidate for public office. A skilled chess player, Masel was director of Wisconsin NORML, and organizer of Weedstock and the annual Great Midwest Marijuana Harvest Festival which has been held in front of the Wisconsin State Capitol every autumn since 1971.

Masel, who was known for his Yippie theatrics and anti-war and pro-labor activism, was born in the Bronx, grew up in New Jersey, and in 1971 relocated to Madison, where he became a fixture of the Wisconsin political scene for 40 years. He died of cancer in 2011.

== Life and activism ==
=== Education and early activism ===
Masel, who was Jewish, was born in New York in 1954 and grew up in New Jersey, became involved with the Youth International Party when he was a teenager, earning him the distinction of being the youngest person on Nixon's Enemies List. Masel was arrested during the Yippie protests at the 1968 Democratic National Convention in Chicago. The arrest embarked Masel on a lifelong career of First Amendment litigation and activism.

In 1971, Masel moved to Madison, Wisconsin. He attended the University of Wisconsin briefly before being expelled for his involvement in demonstrations.

Masel, a Yippie “street theatre” Vietnam War and personal freedom protester, made national headlines in 1976 for heckling segregationist Alabama Governor George Wallace from a wheelchair. Over his lifetime, Masel was arrested 137 times.

=== Harvestfest and Weedstock ===
The Great Midwest Marijuana Harvest Festival in Madison, the oldest and longest running cannabis rights festival in the United States, was first held in 1971 following a series of marijuana-trafficking arrests and marchers carried signs reading "Free Dana Beal". Masel organized the demonstration to support Beal, and after that it became an annual event.

Masel's roving Weedstock “protestival” was held for fourteen years, from 1988 to 2001.

=== Political writing and publishing ===
Masel was a reporter for The Yipster Times, a newspaper of the Youth International Party, or Yippies.

In 1985, Masel co-authored Blacklisted News: Secret Histories from Chicago, ’68 to 1984, a comprehensive history of the Youth International Party.

Masel published the underground newspaper Zenger from 1987 to 1993.

Until his death, Masel maintained online political action blogs and petitions at Myspace, Facebook, and alternative media sites.

=== Election campaigns and advocacy ===
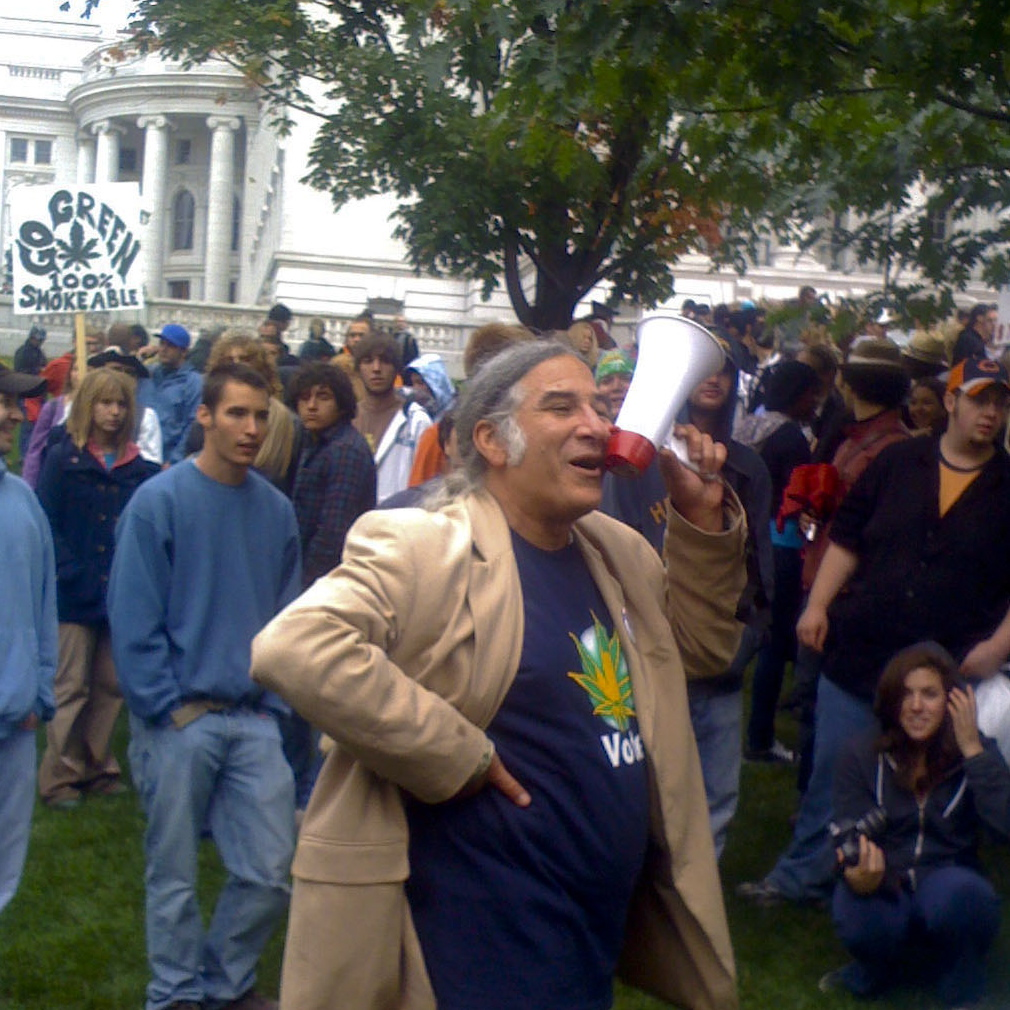
Ben Masel at the Great Midwest Marijuana Harvest Festival in 2008

According to Steve DeAngelo, the first Hemp Tour in 1989 was Masel’s idea. Jack Herer visited fourteen American cities, promoting the revised edition of his book The Emperor Wears No Clothes, in 1989.

In 1990, Masel ran against Wisconsin Governor Tommy Thompson in the Republican primary.

When the 1990 Midwest Marijuana Harvest Festival at the Wisconsin Capitol drew the criticism of Attorney General Don Hanaway, Masel challenged Hanaway to a chess match in order to prove that cannabis does not diminish intelligence. Hanaway declined Masel's chess game challenge.

During a 1992 write-in bid for Dane County sheriff, Masel's campaign poster pictured him naked with the slogan: "Nothing to Hide, Masel for Sheriff". He got more than 7,000 votes. And when he made the ballot in 1994 as the Democratic candidate for sheriff, Masel received more than 39,000 votes.

Masel challenged US Senator Herb Kohl in the Democratic primary in 2006 and got over 50,000 votes (about 15 percent).

At the time he was diagnosed with cancer in 2011, Masel was again seeking the Wisconsin Democratic Party endorsement for US senator.

=== Civil rights career ===
Masel was a professional protester. He got a $95,000 settlement from Sauk County, Wisconsin, after police officers wearing body armor arrested about a dozen Weedstock festival-goers, including Masel, who refused an order to vacate the grounds after being told the festival could not be held on a private field there, in 2000.

On June 29, 2006, while lawfully gathering signatures during an election campaign, Masel was confronted by two University of Wisconsin–Madison police officers who threw him to the ground, pinned him with a knee on his back and then pepper-sprayed him in the face. Masel's federal civil rights suit against police officers John McCaughtry and Michael Mansavage which was heard at trial in 2009 before a hung jury and was to be reheard at a second trial in 2010, was settled out of court. Masel agreed to accept $7,500 from the state of Wisconsin to dismiss the appeal.

A longtime friend of Masel, Amy Gros-Louis, told a Wisconsin State Journal reporter that “Ben knew the laws better than the police did.” Masel fought limitations to free speech and the right to assemble. Whenever police tried to stop him, he would sue. And he usually won, according to Jeff Scott Olson, Masel's lawyer.

=== Legacy and recognition ===
In April, 2011, Masel was recognized by the National Organization for the Reform of Marijuana Laws board of directors with an award of special appreciation for "A Lifetime of Outstanding Work in Advancing the Cause of Legalizing Marijuana".

The 420 Chess Club held an online competition called The Ben Masel Memorial 420 Chess Tournament from May, 2011, through February, 2012.

On May 17, 2011, the City of Madison Common Council declared April 20 to be Ben Masel Day.

Masel was named High Times’ Freedom Fighter of the Month in August, 2011.

== Illness and death ==
In January, 2011, Masel was diagnosed with lung cancer. He underwent a series of radiation treatments and was given steroids to aid his breathing, but became too weak to undergo chemotherapy. Nevertheless, Masel remained upbeat and never stopped demonstrating, even defying his doctor's advice in order to join a month-long labor rights protest being held at the Wisconsin State Capitol during April. Masel, who did not have health insurance, died in a hospice, surrounded by friends and family, on April 30, 2011. He is survived by his daughter, Semilla Anderson, and granddaughter, Anandi.
