= Mifflin Township, Pennsylvania =

Mifflin Township is the name of some places in the U.S. state of Pennsylvania:

- Mifflin Township, Columbia County, Pennsylvania
- Mifflin Township, Dauphin County, Pennsylvania
- Mifflin Township, Lycoming County, Pennsylvania

== See also ==
- Fort Mifflin, on the Delaware River below Philadelphia, Pennsylvania
- Mifflin, Pennsylvania, a borough in Juniata County
- Mifflin County, Pennsylvania
- Lower Mifflin Township, Cumberland County, Pennsylvania
- Upper Mifflin Township, Pennsylvania
- Mifflin (disambiguation)
