= Great Midwest Marijuana Harvest Festival =

Madison festival

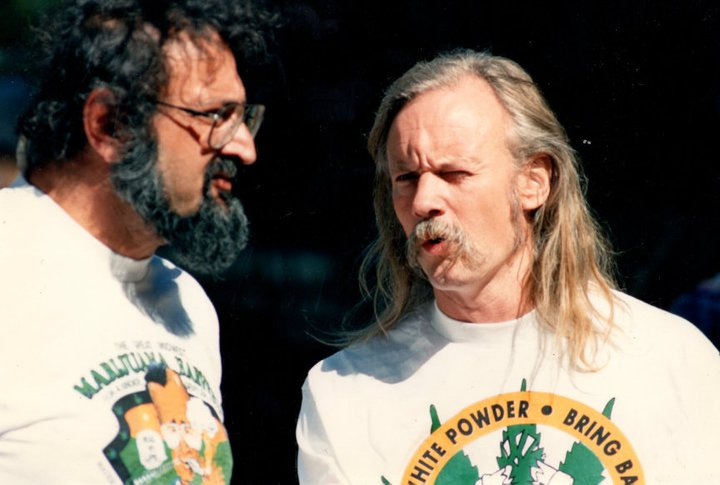
Jack Herer and Dana Beal at the 1989 festival

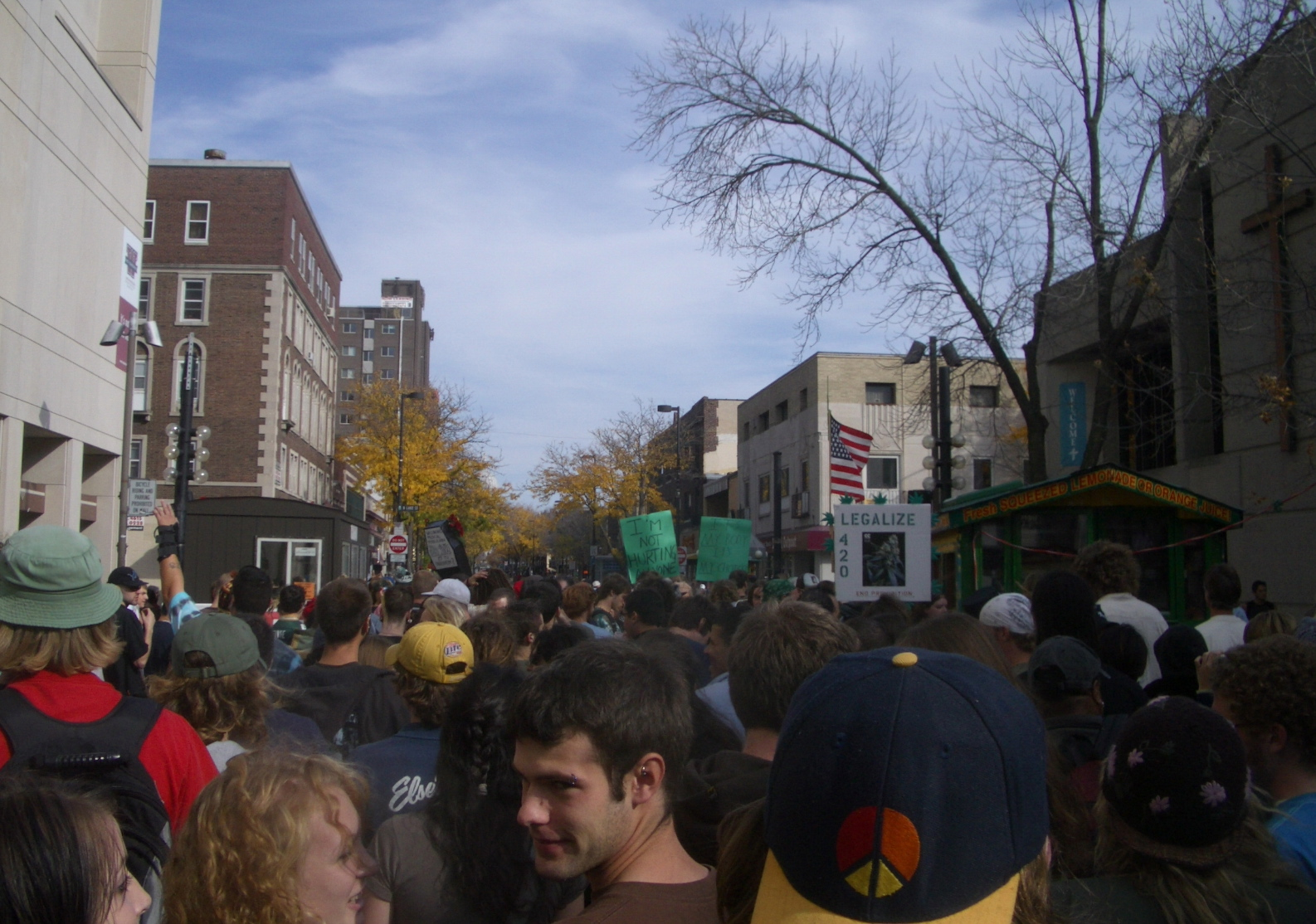
The event in 2006

The Great Midwest Marijuana Harvest Festival is the longest running cannabis rights festival in the United States, held annually in Madison, Wisconsin since 1971.

The festival was initiated and organized by Yippie and cannabis activist Ben Masel until his death in 2011.

In 2014, the 44th annual festival was held at Library Mall. The same space was used in 2016.

What would have been the golden anniversary festival in 2020 had to be deferred to 2021. The Great Midwest Marijuana Harvest Festival has been rebranded to be a more holistic experience placing a strong emphasis on education and advocacy, aiming to dispel misconceptions and promote evidence-based information about cannabis. The festivals newly appointed four points of focus are Equity, Sustainability, Advocacy and Agribusiness. The festival, renamed as The Great Midwest Hemp Fest, is being run by R&R Productions Company founders Chris Ronan and Nicklaus Rueda and will return to Library Mall October 1st, 2023.

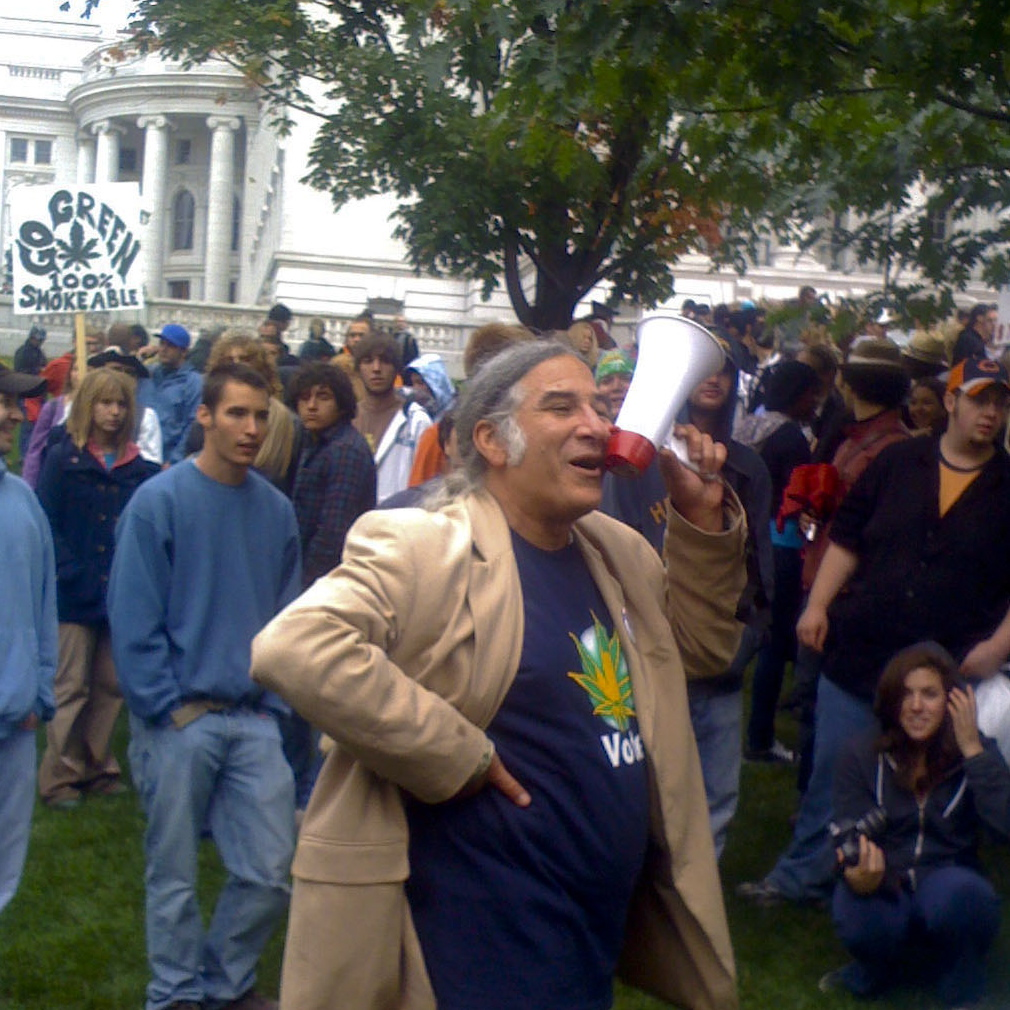
Ben Masel at the 2008 festival. Masel initiated the festival in 1971 and oversaw its organization until his death.
