= List of variations on a theme by another composer =

Many classical and later composers have written compositions in the form of variations on a theme by another composer.

This is an incomplete list of such works, sorted by the name of the original composer. The list does not include variations written on composers' own or original themes, or on folk, traditional or anonymous melodies.

Many of these works are called simply "Variations on a Theme of/by ...". Other works, which often involve substantial development or transformation of the base material, may have more fanciful titles such as Caprice, Fantasy, Paraphrase, Reminiscences, Rhapsody, etc. These other types of treatments are not listed here unless there is evidence that they include variations on a theme.

== Adam de la Halle ==
- Rolande Falcinelli: Variations sur un rondeau d'Adam de la Halle (from 14 Études insérées dans l'Initation à l'orgue)

== Adolphe Adam ==
- Carl Czerny: Fantasia and Variations on Favorite Airs from Le postillon de Lonjumeau, Op. 474 (piano)
- Henri Herz: Fantaisie et variations sur deux motifs du Postillon de Lonjumeau, Op. 94 (piano)

== Dionisio Aguado y García ==
- Emilio Pujol: Variations on a Theme by Aguado (guitar)

== Antoine Albanèse ==
- Wolfgang Amadeus Mozart:
  - 12 Variations in G on "La Bergère Célimène", K. 374a (violin and piano)
  - Variations in G on "Hélas, j'ai perdu mon amant" (recte "Au bord d'une fontaine"), K. 374b (violin and piano)

== Charles-Valentin Alkan ==
- Peter Lamb (1925-2013): Alkan Variations for two double basses and piano (2002). Based on the theme of Alkan's Le festin d'Ésope.
- Nikolaos-Laonikos Psimikakis-Chalkokondylis: 11 Transformations on Alkan, 2 violins, viola & cello (2013). The composer's note states: "The material of each of the transformations consists entirely of the notes and rests found in the first six measures of a string quartet by Alkan."
- Ronald Stevenson: Le Festin d'Alkan RSS 337 (piano; 1988–97). The third movement consists of multiple variations on themes by Alkan. The composer's note states "This work encapsulates my idea that composition, transcription and variation are all essentially the same thing".

== Alexander Alyabyev ==
- Mikhail Glinka: Variations on "The Nightingale" in E minor (piano; 1833)

== Louis Angely ==
- Johann Nepomuk Hummel: Variations brillantes on Das Fest der Handwerken, Op. 115 (piano and orchestra; 1830)

== Thomas Arne ==
- Ludwig van Beethoven: 5 Variations on "Rule, Britannia!", WoO 79 (piano)
- Johann Nepomuk Hummel: Variations on "Rule, Britannia!", S 187, WoO 10 (piano)
- Franz Liszt: Grand concert paraphrase on "God Save the Queen" and "Rule Britannia"

== Daniel Auber ==
- Carl Czerny:
  - Brilliant variations on the Tyrolean theme from La fiancée, Op. 228 (piano 6-hands)
  - Variations brillantes sur le duo favori "Dépéchons, travaillons" ("Ohne Rast, angefasst") de l'opéra Le Maçon (piano 4-hands)
  - Grandes variations di bravura on Fra Diavolo, Op. 232 (piano solo)
- César Franck: Variations brillantes sur la ronde favorite de Gustave III (piano and orchestra; 1834/35)
- Henri Herz:
  - Variations concertantes sur la tyrolienne favorite de La fiancée, Op. 56 (violin and piano)
  - Variations concertantes sur la barcarolle favorite de Fra Diavolo, Op. 59 (violin and piano)
  - Variations concertantes sur la marche favorite du Philtre (Der Liebestrank), Op. 70 (piano 4-hands)
  - Variations et rondo sur Le lac des fées, Op. 114
  - Fantaisie et variations brillantes sur des motifs de La sirene

== Marx Augustin ==
- Henri Herz: Variations sur l'air allemand "O Mein lieber Augustin" (piano 4-hands)
- Johann Nepomuk Hummel: Variations on "O du lieber Augustin" in C major, S. 47, WoO 2 (orchestra)
- Franz Krommer: Variations on "Oh du lieber Augustin" in D major, Op. 59, P IX:10 (flute quartet)
- Paul Wranitzky:
  - Variations on "Oh du lieber Augustin" (xylophone, strings, trumpet and drums)
  - Variations on "Oh du lieber Augustin" (orchestra)

== Carl Philipp Emanuel Bach ==
- Julius Bürger: Variations on a Theme of Carl Philipp Emanuel Bach (orchestra)

== Johann Sebastian Bach ==
- Elia Alessandro Calderan: Bach Variations (Variazioni sur un preludio di J S Bach)
- Elliot del Borgo: Chorale Paraphrase - based upon the chorale "Sleepers Awake" (concert band; 1999)
- Norman Dello Joio: Variants on a Bach Chorale, for orchestra, 1986
- Edison Denisov: "Es ist genug", Variations on "Es ist genug" (It is enough) from Bach's cantata O Ewigkeit, du Donnerwort, BWV 60, setting a melody by Johann Rudolf Ahle (viola and piano, 1984; viola, flute, oboe, celeste and string quintet, 1986)
- Ben Emberley: Variations and Fugue on a Theme of J.S Bach, Op. 44 (two pianos; 2021) (Theme is the Gavotte en Rondeau from Partita No. 3 in E major, BWV 1006 )
- Charlotte Hampe: Variations on a Chorale of Johann Sebastian Bach (violin and viola; 1982)
- Richard Kearns:
  - Variation on an Invention by J. S. Bach (winds; brass)
  - Variations on Fugue BWV 1080
  - Variation on a Theme by Bach ("Playing a round with Bach")
- Giorgi Latso: Variations on a Theme of J. S. Bach
- Franz Liszt: Variations on a Theme from Weinen, Klagen, Sorgen, Zagen (BWV 12), S.180 (piano; 1862), based on BWV 12
- David Matthews: Variations on Bach's Chorale Die Nacht ist Kommen Op 40 (for strings, 1986)
- Max Reger: Variations and Fugue on a Theme of Bach, Op. 81 (piano; 1904)
- Marga Richter: Variations and Interludes on Themes from Monteverdi and Bach (concerto for violin, cello, piano and large orchestra; 1992)
- Georg Schumann: Variations and Fugue on a Theme of Bach, Op. 59 (orchestra)
- Robert Simpson: Variations and Fugue on a Theme by Bach (strings; 1991)
- Reginald Smith Brindle: Variants on Two Themes of J. S. Bach (guitar; 1970)
- Ronald Stevenson: 18 Variations on a Bach Chorale (piano; 1946)
- Alexander Winkler: Variations and Fugue on a Theme by J. S. Bach, in E♭ major for 2 pianos, Op. 12 (1906)

== Béla Bartók ==
- Andreas Benend: Variationen über ein Thema von Bartók (piano)
- Reena Esmail: Il giuoco del "giuoco delle coppie": Variations on a Theme of Béla Bartók (piano; 2004)
- Ivo Petrić: Variations on a Theme of Bartók (viola and piano; 1954)

== Antoine-Laurent Baudron ==
- Wolfgang Amadeus Mozart: 12 Variations in E♭ major on the Romance "Je suis Lindor" from Le barbier de Seville, K. 354 (piano)

== Arnold Bax ==
- Ronald Stevenson: Fugue, Variations and Epilogue on a Theme of Bax (piano; 1982–83; 2003)

== Ludwig van Beethoven ==
- Edwin Carr: 6 Variations on a Theme by Beethoven (piano; 1992)
- Carl Czerny: Variations on the Beloved "Sehnsucht Waltz" by Beethoven
- Stephen Heller:
  - 33 Variations on a Theme of Beethoven, Op. 130
  - 21 Variations on a Theme of Beethoven, Op. 133
- Franz Hummel: 33 Veränderungen über einen Walzer von Anton Diabelli (a paraphrase of Beethoven's Variations?) (piano; 2006/07)
- Ilja Hurník: Variations on a Theme of Beethoven (viola and piano; 1998)
- Friedrich Kuhlau:
  - 9 Variations on "Heart, My Heart, What Is Giving?" (Op. 75/2), Op. 72a (piano 4-hands; 1826)
  - Variations on "The Quails Beating" (WoO 129), Op. 75 (piano 4-hands; 1826)
  - Variations on "The Luck of Life" (Op. 88), Op. 76 (piano 4-hands; 1826)
  - Variations on "Longing" (Op. 83/2), Op. 77 (piano 4-hands; 1826)
- Max Reger: Variations and Fugue on a theme of Beethoven (orchestra or for two pianos)
- Rudolf, Archduke of Austria: Forty Variations on a Theme by Beethoven (piano, on "O Hoffnung", WoO 200)
- Camille Saint-Saëns: Variations on a Theme of Beethoven, Op. 35 (2 pianos; 1874; on the Trio from movement III, Menuetto, of Piano Sonata No. 18, Op. 31/3)
- Franz Schmidt: Concertante Variations on a Theme of Beethoven (piano left hand and orchestra; 1923)
- Georg Schumann: Variations and Fugue on a Theme of Beethoven, Op. 32 (2 pianos)
- Robert Schumann:
  - Studies in the Form of Free Variations on a Theme by Beethoven, WoO. 31 (piano)
  - Variations on a Theme by Beethoven (unpub.)
- Peter Sculthorpe:
  - Beethoven Variations (versions for didgeridoo and orchestra; orchestra with optional didgeridoo; 2003)
- Robert Simpson: Variations and Finale on a Theme by Beethoven (piano; 1990)
- Rafał Stradomski: Beethoven Variations (piano; 2008)
- Hans Zender: 33 Veränderungen über 33 Veränderungen (Ensemble; 2010/11)

== Jack Behrens ==
- Godfrey Ridout: Ontario Variations: 4 Variations on a Theme by Jack Behrens (piano; 1979)

== Vincenzo Bellini ==
- Charles-Valentin Alkan: Variations sur "La tremenda ultrice spada" d' I Capuleti e i Montecchi de Bellini, Op. 16/5 (piano, 1834).
- Ole Bull: Fantaisie et variations de bravoure sur un thème de Bellini, Op. 3 (violin and orchestra)
- Frédéric Chopin: see Hexameron
- Carl Czerny:
  - Introduction, Variations and Polacca after a Theme from Il pirata, Op. 160 (piano and orchestra)
  - Variations brillantes on a Theme from Norma, Op. 197 (piano 6-hands)
  - Grand Trio No. 4 Air from I Capuleti e i Montecchi with Variations, Op. 295 (piano 6-hands)
  - Brilliant Variations on a Theme from Norma, Op. 297 (piano 6-hands)
  - Fantaisie et variations sur I puritani, Op. 376
  - Variations sur un motif de l'opera La sonnambula, Op. 333/2 (piano)
  - see also Hexameron
- Louise Farrenc: Variations sur un thème des Capuleti de Bellini, Op. 29 (piano 4-hands, arrangements for 2 or 3 pianos)
- Mikhail Glinka: Variations on a Theme from I Capuleti e i Montecchi in C major (piano; 1832)
- Henri Herz:
  - Grandes variations seul sur la marche favorite de l'opéra I puritani, Op. 82
  - Fantaisie et variations sur un thème favori de Bellini, Op. 90 (piano and orchestra)
  - Variations Brillantes on a Theme by Bellini - La Sonnambula, Op. 105
  - see also Hexameron
- Hexameron, a collaborative piano work by Frédéric Chopin, Carl Czerny, Henri Herz, Franz Liszt, Johann Peter Pixis and Sigismond Thalberg, who all wrote variations on a theme from I puritani
- Friedrich August Kummer: Adagio et variations sur un thème de l'opéra I Capuleti e i Montecchi, Op. 31 (cello and piano or string quartet)
- Franz Liszt: see Hexameron
- Joseph Merk: Air final varié de La sonnambula, Op. 37
- Elias Parish Alvars: Introduction and Variations on Themes from Norma (harp)
- Johann Peter Pixis: see Hexameron
- Clara Schumann: Variations de Concert on a Cavatina from Bellini's Il Pirata, Op. 8 (piano)
- Sigismond Thalberg:
  - Grande fantaisie et variations sur un motif de l'opéra I Montecchi et Capuleti, Op. 10
  - Grande fantaisie et variations sur des motifs de l'opéra Norma, Op. 12
  - See also Hexameron

== Alban Berg ==
- T. J. Anderson: Variations on a Theme by Alban Berg (viola and piano; 1977)
- Ross Lee Finney: Variations on a Theme by Alban Berg (piano; 1977, on the opening theme of the Violin Concerto)
- Hans Erich Apostel: First string quartet (variations on a theme from Wozzeck in the 2nd movement)

== Luciano Berio ==
- Carlos Stella: Pastiches, Parodies and Variations on two themes by Stravinsky and Berio (piccolo clarinet, trombone, xylorimba and vibraphone)

== Charles Auguste de Bériot ==
- José Ferrer: Fantasía con variaciones sobre un tema de Bériot, Op. 3 (guitar)

== Hector Berlioz ==
- Walter Braunfels: Phantastiche Erscheinungen eines Themas von Hector Berlioz ( Fantastic Appearances of a Theme by Berlioz), Op. 25, for symphony orchestra (1914–1917; the theme is the "Song of the Flea" from La damnation de Faust)
- Ronald Stevenson: Variations vocalises sur deux thèmes de Les Troyens (mezzo-soprano and orchestra; 1969)
- John Scott Whiteley: Variations on a Theme of Berlioz, Op. 1 (organ; 1973/84)

== Leonard Bernstein ==
- John Williams: "For New York" (Variations on theme by Leonard Bernstein) (1988)

== Henri-Montan Berton ==
- Friedrich Kuhlau: Variations on an Air by Berton, WoO 196 (piano; 1808)

== Francesco Bianchi ==
- Carl Maria von Weber: 7 Variations sur l'air "Vien quà, Dorina bella", Op. 7, J. 53 (1807)

== Henry Bishop ==
- Henri Herz: Variations et rondeau brillant on "Home! Sweet Home!", Op. 16 (2 pianos)
- Sigismond Thalberg: "Home! Sweet Home!", air anglais varié, Op. 72

== Georges Bizet ==
- Vladimir Horowitz: Variations on a Theme from Carmen (piano)

== François-Adrien Boieldieu and Sophie Gail ==
- Henri Herz: Variations brillantes sur l'air favori "Ma Fanchette est charmante" (from Angéla, ou L'atelier de Jean Cousin), Op. 10

== Johannes Brahms ==
- Heinrich von Herzogenberg: Variations on a Theme by Brahms, Op. 23 (piano 4-hands)
- Saburō Moroi: Variations on a Theme of Brahms (1919)
- Carlos Stella: Brahms im Spiegelkabinett (variations on a theme of Brahms for piccolo, violoncello and piano, 2007)

== Frank Bridge ==
- Benjamin Britten: Variations on a Theme of Frank Bridge, Op. 10 (strings; 1937)

== Benjamin Britten ==
- Gary Kulesha: Variations on a Theme by Benjamin Britten (2003)

== Anton Bruckner ==
- Lowell Liebermann Variations on a Theme of Anton Bruckner, Op. 19 (1986)
- Marian Lejava Ciaccona (sonata no.1) for solo violin with a Theme of Anton Bruckner, Op. 14 (2010-12)

== Friedrich Burgmüller ==
- Henri Herz: Variations caractéristiques sur un thème arabe ("Pas de l'abeille", de La péri), Op. 137

== William Byrd ==
- Sérgio Azevedo: The Leaves Be Greene: Simple Variations on a Ground of William Byrd (viola and strings; 2000)
- Ruth Gipps: Variations on Byrd's "Non nobis", for small orchestra, Op. 7 (1942)

== Antonio de Cabezón ==
- Manuel Ponce: Variations on a Theme of Cabezón (guitar; 1948)

== André Campra ==
- La Guirlande de Campra (1952), a collaborative orchestral work by 7 French composers, who each wrote a variation on a theme by Campra (Georges Auric, Jean-Yves Daniel-Lesur, Arthur Honegger, Francis Poulenc, Alexis Roland-Manuel, Henri Sauguet and Germaine Tailleferre)

== Michele Carafa ==
- Amédée Méreaux: Adagio, variations et polonaise sur un thème favori de Carafa, Op. 21

== Luigi Carlini ==
- Mikhail Glinka: Variations on Two Themes from the ballet Chao-Kang in D major (piano; 1831)

== Thomas of Celano ==
Thomas is disputed as the author of the words

- Kaikhosru Shapurji Sorabji:
  - Variazioni e fuga triplice sopra "Dies irae" per pianoforte
  - Sequentia cyclica super "Dies irae" ex Missa pro defunctis

== Luigi Cherubini ==
- Mikhail Glinka: Variations on a Theme from Faniska in B♭ major (piano, 1826–27)
- Johann Nepomuk Hummel: Variations on a March by Cherubini in E major, Op. 9 (piano; 1802)

== Frédéric Chopin ==
- Jurriaan Andriessen: Variation on a theme of Chopin (Prelude in C minor, Op. 28/20) (for organ)
- Jørgen Bentzon: Variations on a Theme of Chopin, Op. 1
- Benjamin C. S. Boyle: Variations on a Theme of Chopin (piano; 2002)
- Ferruccio Busoni:
  - Variations and Fugue in Free Form on Chopin's Prelude in C minor (Op. 28/20), Op. 22, BV.213 (piano; 1884)
  - 10 Variations on a Prelude by Chopin, BV.213a (piano; 1922)
- Steve Hackett: Variation on a Theme by Chopin (guitar)
- Friedrich Kalkbrenner: Variations on a Mazurka by Chopin, Op. 120 (Mazurka in B♭, Op. 7/1; piano)
- Federico Mompou: Variations on a Theme of Chopin (piano; 1957)
- Zygmunt Noskowski: "From the Life of a Nation": Symphonic Variations on Chopin's Prelude in A, Op. 28/7
- Sergei Rachmaninoff: Variations on a Theme of Chopin, Op. 22 (piano; 1903)
- Roger Smalley: Variations on a Theme of Chopin (piano; 1988–89)
- Rafał Stradomski:
  - Largo: Variations on a Theme by Chopin (piano; 2000)
  - Notturno: Variations on a Theme by Chopin (piano; 2004)
- Georg Tintner: Variations on a Theme of Chopin (piano)

== Muzio Clementi ==
- Boris Blacher: Variations on a Theme of Muzio Clementi (piano and orchestra; 1961)

== Henri Cliquet-Pleyel ==
- Darius Milhaud: Variations sur un thème de Cliquet, Op. 23 (1915).

== Giuseppe Concone ==
- Felix Swinstead: Variations on a Theme by Concone (piano)

== Arcangelo Corelli ==
- Richard Kearns: Variations on a Theme by Corelli
- Fritz Kreisler: Variations on a Theme by Corelli, in the style of Tartini (violin and piano; 1937)
- Sergei Rachmaninoff: Variations on a Theme of Corelli, Op. 42 (piano; 1931)
- Christian Heinrich Rinck: Variations on a Theme by Corelli, Op. 56 (organ)
- Giuseppe Tartini: L'Arte dell'Arco (The Art of the Bow): 50 variations on Correlli's Gavotte, Op. 5/10 (cello solo; 1758)
- Aristid von Würtzler: Variations on a theme of Corelli (harp solo; 1968)

== François Couperin ==
- Hendrik Andriessen: Variations on a Theme by Couperin (flute, strings and harp;1944)

== Nicolas Dalayrac ==
- Johann Nepomuk Hummel: Variations on an Aria from Les deux petits savoyards in A minor, Op. 15, (piano; c. 1804)

== Franz Danzi ==
- Louis Spohr: Fantasy and Variations on a Theme by Danzi, Op. 81 (clarinet and string orchestra; c. 1811)

== Claude Debussy ==
- Ulrich Leyendecker: Penseés sur un Prélude. Variations on Debussy's prelude No. 6, Des pas sur la neige (orchestral, 2001)

== Edison Denisov ==
- Yuri Kasparov: Beyond the Time: Variations on a Theme of Denisov (14 performers; 1998)

== Nicolas Dezède ==
- Wolfgang Amadeus Mozart: 9 Variations in C major on the arietta "Lison dormait" from Julie, K. 264 (piano)

== Anton Diabelli ==
- Ludwig van Beethoven: Diabelli Variations (Thirty-three variations on a waltz by Diabelli in C major), Op. 120 (piano; 1823)
- Vaterländischer Künstlerverein: variations by 50 composers on the above waltz:
  - Ignaz Assmayer (or Aßmayer), Carl Maria von Bocklet, Leopold Eustachius Czapek (or Čapek), Carl Czerny, Joseph Czerny, Moritz Graf von Dietrichstein, Joseph Drechsler, Emanuel Aloys Förster, Franz Jakob Freystädtler, Johann Baptist Gänsbacher, Joseph Gelinek, Anton Halm, Joachim Hoffmann, Johann Horzalka, Joseph Huglmann (or Hugelmann), Johann Nepomuk Hummel (S. 161), Anselm Hüttenbrenner, Friedrich Kalkbrenner, Friedrich August Kanne, Joseph Kerzkowsky, Conradin Kreutzer, Eduard Baron von Lannoy, Maximilian Joseph Leidesdorf, Franz Liszt (Variation on a Waltz by Diabelli, S.147), Joseph Mayseder, Ignaz Moscheles, Ignaz Franz Edler von Mosel, Franz Xaver Wolfgang Mozart, Joseph Panny, Hieronymus Payer, Johann Peter Pixis, Wenzel Plachy, Gottfried Rieger, Philipp Jakob Riotte, Franz Roser, Johann Baptist Schenk, Franz Schoberlechner, Franz Schubert (D. 718), Simon Sechter, Archduke Rudolf of Austria, Maximilian Stadler, Joseph von Szalay (or de Szalay), Václav Tomášek, Michael Umlauf, Bedřich Diviš Weber, Franz Weber, Carl Angelus von Winkhler, Franz Weiss, Jan August Vitásek, Jan Václav Voříšek.

== Carl Ditters von Dittersdorf ==
- Ludwig van Beethoven: 13 Variations on the aria "Es war einmal ein alter Mann" from Das rote Käppchen, WoO 66 (piano)
- Anton Reicha: Variations on a Theme of Dittersdorf (cello and orchestra)

== Gaetano Donizetti ==
- Charles-Valentin Alkan
  - Variations sur "Ah! Segnata é la mia morte" d'Anna Bolena, Op. 16/4 (piano,1834).
  - Variations à la vieille sur l'air chanté par Mme. Persiani dans l'Elisir d'amore de G. Donizetti (piano, 1840).
- Carl Czerny:
  - Caprice et variations brillantes sur le thème "Versàr potrà le lagrime" de l'opéra Torquato Tasso, Op. 448
  - Introduction et variations brillantes sur le galop favori de l'opéra Lucia di Lammermoor, Op. 490
- Louise Farrenc: Variations brillantes sur la cavatine d'Anna Bolena de Donizetti "Nel veder la tua costanza", Op. 15 (ca. 1835)
- Adolfo Fumagalli: La sacrilega parola: Variations on the grande adagio finale from Act II of Poliuto, Op. 62 (piano)
- Mikhail Glinka: Variations brillantes on a Theme from Anna Bolena in A major (piano; 1831)
- Adolf von Henselt: Variations on "Io son ricco" from L'elisir d'amore, Op. 1 (piano)
- Henri Herz:
  - Variations concertantes sur la chansonnette favorite de La fille du régiment, Op. 24 (violin and piano)
  - Grande fantaisie et variations brillantes sur des motifs de l'opéra L'Élisir d'amore, Op. 112
  - Fantaisie et variations brillantes sur l'opéra Parisina, Op. 133
- Carlo Alfredo Piatti: Introduction and Variations on a Theme from Lucia di Lammermoor, Op. 2 (cello and piano)
- Adrien-François Servais: La Fille du Régiment: Fantaisie et variations, Op. 16 (cello and piano; cello and string quartet; cello and orchestra)
- Sigismond Thalberg:
  - Andante final de Lucia di Lammermoor, Op. 44
  - Introduction et variations sur la barcarolle de L'elisir d'amore, Op. 66

== The Doors ==
- Friedrich Gulda: Variations on "Light My Fire"

== John Dowland ==
- Benjamin Britten: Lachrymae, Reflections on a song of Dowland ("If My Complaints Could Passions Move") (viola and piano;1950)
- Jan Pieterszoon Sweelinck: Variations on the "Lachrimae Pavane"

== Ernst Christoph Dressler ==
- Ludwig van Beethoven: 9 Variations on a March by Dressler, WoO 63 (piano)

== Guillaume Du Fay ==
- Arnold Cooke: Variations on a Theme of Dufay (orchestra; 1969)

== Jean-Pierre Duport ==
- Wolfgang Amadeus Mozart: 9 Variations in D major on a Menuet by Jean-Pierre Duport, K. 573 (piano)

== Antonín Dvořák ==
- Oskar Nedbal: Variations on a Theme by Antonín Dvořák, Op. 1 (piano)

== Werner Egk ==
- Jan Koetsier: Introduction and Variations on a Theme from Die Zaubergeige, Op. 82, No. 3 (viola and piano; 1978)

== Manuel de Falla ==
- Gian Francesco Malipiero: Variazione sulla pantomima dell' Amor brujo di Manuel de Falla (piano; 1959)

== Giles Farnaby ==
- Bernard Stevens: Introduction, Variations and Fugue on a theme of Giles Farnaby, Op. 47, for orchestra (1972)

== Johann Christian Fischer ==
- Wolfgang Amadeus Mozart: 12 Variations in C major on a Menuet by Johann Christian Fischer, K. 179 (piano)

== Stephen Foster ==
- Earl Wild: Doo-Dah Variations (based on "Camptown Races"; piano and orchestra; 1992)

== Frederick II "The Great" of Prussia ==
- Johann Sebastian Bach: The Musical Offering is entirely based on "The King's Theme"
- Giovanni Paisiello: "Les Adieux de la Grande Duchesse des Russies" includes variations on “The King’s Theme”

== Girolamo Frescobaldi ==
- Karl Höller: Symphonic Variations (or Symphonic Fantasy) on a Theme of Girolamo Frescobaldi, Op. 20 (1935, rev. 1956, 1965)
- Theophil Laitenberger: Variations on a Theme after Frescobaldi (viola and piano or organ; 1978)
- Ennio Morricone: Variations on a Theme by Frescobaldi (piano; 1955)

== Baron von Fricken ==
- Robert Schumann: Symphonic Studies, Op. 13 (piano; 1834; a set of variations and études on a theme by von Fricken, a musical amateur, followed by a variation on the Romance "Du stolzes England freue dich" (Proud England, rejoice!), from Heinrich Marschner's opera Der Templer und die Jüdin)

== Johann Jakob Froberger ==
- Walter Niemann: Variations on a Saraband by Johann Jacob Froberger, Op. 168 (piano; pub. 1948); the source is the Sarabande from Partita in A minor, FbWV 601

== Sophie Gail ==
- see #François-Adrien Boieldieu

== Wenzel Robert von Gallenberg ==
- Carl Czerny: Introduction et variations faciles sur un walse de Mr. le Comte de Gallenberg, Op. 87 (piano 4-hands; 1825)
- Louise Farrenc: Grand variations on a Theme by Count Gallenberg, Op. 25 (piano and orchestra)

== Noel Gay ==
- Franz Reizenstein: Variations on The Lambeth Walk

== George Gershwin ==
- Donald Grantham: Fantasy Variations on George Gershwin's Second Prelude for Piano (concert band; 2004)
- Jorge Morel: Variations on a Gershwin theme: "I Got Rhythm" (guitar, 1979)
- Fazıl Say: Summertime Variations (piano, 2005)

== Reinhold Glière ==
- Raymond Lewenthal: Concert Paraphrase and Variations on the Russian Sailors Dance from The Red Poppy (piano)

== Mikhail Glinka ==
- Anatoly Lyadov: Variations on a Theme by Glinka in B♭ major, Op. 35 (piano; 1894)
- Nikolai Rimsky-Korsakov: Variations in G minor on a Theme by Glinka (oboe and military band, 1878)
- Dmitri Shostakovich: 11 Variations on a Theme by Glinka, Op. 104a (piano; 1957)

== Christoph Willibald Gluck ==
- Adrian Enescu: Variations on a Theme by Gluck
- Wolfgang Amadeus Mozart: 10 Variations in G major on the aria "Unser dummer Pöbel meint" from La rencontre imprévue, ou Les pèlerins de la Mecque, K. 455 (piano)
- Anton Reicha: Variations on a Theme by Gluck, Op. 87 (piano)
- Franz Schmidt: Variations on a Theme by Gluck (organ; lost)
- Donald Tovey: Variations on a Theme by Gluck, Op. 28 (flute and string quartet)

== Sir Eugene Goossens ==
- Variations on a Theme by Eugene Goossens, a collaborative work by 9 composers (Ernest Bloch, Aaron Copland, Paul Creston, Anis Fuleihan, Roy Harris, Walter Piston, Bernard Rogers, Roger Sessions and Deems Taylor, with Goossens himself writing the finale; orchestra; 1946)

== Louis Moreau Gottschalk ==
- John Diercks: Variations on a Theme of Gottschalk (tuba and piano)

== Christian Ernst Graf ==
- Wolfgang Amadeus Mozart: 8 Variations in G major on the Dutch song "Laat ons Juichen, Batavieren!", K. 24 (piano)

== Alexander Gretchaninov ==
- Kaikhosru Shapurji Sorabji: Variazioni sopra il Credo in qualsiasi modo del Gretchaninoff (the second movement of Sorabji's Opusculum clavisymphonicum vel claviorchestrale)
- Alan Theisen: Variations on a Theme of Gretchaninov (2001; rev. 2005)

== André Grétry ==
- Ludwig van Beethoven: 8 Variations on "Une fièvre brûlante" from Richard Coeur-de-lion, WoO 72 (piano)
- Wolfgang Amadeus Mozart: 8 Variations in F major on the choir "Dieu d'amour" from Les mariages samnites, K. 352 (piano)
- Anton Reicha: Variations on a Theme by Grétry and a Rondeau, Op. 102 (piano)

== Edvard Grieg ==
- Walter Gieseking: Variations on a theme by Grieg (violin and piano)
- Alistair Hinton: Variations and Fugue on a theme of Grieg, Op. 16 (piano, 1970–78; on "The Death of Ase" from Peer Gynt)
- Nikolai Myaskovsky: The final movement of his String Quartet No. 3 is a set of variations on a theme of Grieg
- Maurice Ravel: Variations on a Theme of Grieg ("The Death of Ase" from Peer Gynt; piano; 1888) (lost)

== Jakob Haibel ==
- Ludwig van Beethoven: Twelve variations on the "Menuet à la Vigano" from the ballet Le nozze disturbate, WoO 68 (piano)

== Fromental Halévy ==
- Stephen Heller: La dame de pique. Romance variée sur l'opéra de Halévy, Op. 75, No. 2
- Johann Peter Pixis: Fantaisie avec variations sur un duo de L'eclair de Halevy, Op. 133

== George Frideric Handel ==
- Ludwig van Beethoven: 12 Variations on "See, the Conqu'ring Hero Comes!" from Judas Maccabaeus, WoO 45 (cello and piano)
- Johannes Brahms: Variations and Fugue on a Theme by Handel, Op. 24 (piano; 1861)
- Edison Denisov: Variations on a Theme by Handel (piano)
- George Draga: Variations on a Theme of Handel (orchestra; 2007)
- Mauro Giuliani: Variations on a Theme of Handel ("The Harmonious Blacksmith"), Op. 107 (guitar; c. 1828)
- Percy Grainger: Variations on "The Harmonious Blacksmith" (1911) (?lost)
- Johan Halvorsen: Passacaglia in G minor on a Theme by George Frideric Handel for violin and viola or cello (1897)
- Józef Koffler: Handeliana, 30 Variations on the Theme of Handel's Passacaglia (orchestra; before 1940; lost)
- Marian Lejava: Elogiaria for solo violin - Hommage variations with the Theme of Handel (2017/2019-20)
- Igor Markevitch: Variations, Fugue et Envoi on a Theme of Handel (piano, 1941)
- Robert Matthew-Walker: Variations on a Theme of Handel, Op. 105 (1977)
- David Sydney Morgan: Handel Variations (solo viola and chamber ensemble; 1998)
- Ignaz Moscheles: Variations on a Theme of Handel ("The Harmonious Blacksmith"), Op. 29 (piano)
- Camille Saint-Saëns: Variations on the Act III Chorus "See, the Conqu'ring Hero Comes!" from Judas Maccabaeus (piano 4-hands; c. 1850)
- Bernhard Scholz: Contrapuntal Variations on a Gavotte by Handel, Op. 54 (1882)
- Georg Schumann: Variations and Gigue on Handel's "The Harmonious Blacksmith" for large orchestra, Op. 72 (1925)
- Louis Spohr: Octet in E major, Op. 32, includes variations on "The Harmonious Blacksmith"
- Lionel Tertis:
  - Variations on a Four Bar Theme of Handel (viola and cello; pub. 1961)
  - Variations on a Passacaglia of Handel (2 violas; 1935)
- Robert Volkmann: Variations on a Theme by Handel, Op. 26 (piano)

== Howard Hanson ==
- Samuel Jones: A Symphonic Requiem: Variations on a Theme of Howard Hanson

== Karl Amadeus Hartmann ==
- John McCabe: Variations on a Theme by Karl Amadeus Hartmann (orchestra; 1964)

== Joseph Haydn ==
- Johannes Brahms: Variations on a Theme by Haydn, (Op. 56a, orchestra; Op. 56b, 2 pianos; 1873; also known as Variations on the St. Anthony Chorale; the theme is probably not by Haydn, but possibly by Ignaz Pleyel)
- Carl Czerny:
  - Variations on "Gott erhalte Franz den Kaiser", Op. 73 (piano and orchestra, or piano and string quartet)
  - Variations Faciles on "Gott Erhalte", Op. 521 (piano 4-hands)
  - Variations Faciles on a Theme from Haydn's The Creation, Op. 527 (piano 4-hands)
- Norman Dello Joio: Fantasies on a Theme by Haydn (concert band; 1963)
- Edison Denisov: Death is a Long Sleep (Variations on a Theme of Haydn) (orchestra; 1982)
- Jean Françaix: 11 variations sur un thème de Haydn (9 winds and double bass; 1982)
- Joseph Gelinek: Andante tres favorit de Josph Haydn avec Variations faciles mis pour Le Piano Forte. Published Artaria, Vienna c. 1808.
- John McCabe: Haydn Variations (piano; 1983)
- Niccolò Paganini: Maestoso sonata sentimentale (Variations on "Gott erhalte Franz den Kaiser") (1828)
- André Previn: Variations on a Theme by Haydn (piano; c. 1990)
- Robert Simpson:
  - Variations and Finale on a Theme of Haydn (piano; 1948)
  - String Quartet No. 9 is subtitled "32 Variations and Fugue on a Theme of Haydn" (1982)
- Josef Triebensee: Variations on a Theme by Haydn, for woodwind octet
- Henryk Wieniawski: Variations on "Gott erhalte Franz den Kaiser", in L'école Moderne, Op. 10 (solo violin; 1853)

== Ferdinand Hérold ==
- Frédéric Chopin: Variations brillantes in B♭ major on "Je vends des scapulaires" from Ludovic, Op. 12 (piano; 1833)
- Stephen Heller: Variations brillantes sur l'opéra Zampa, Op. 6
- Henri Herz: Variations on the Trio from Le pré aux clercs, Op. 76
- Franz Schubert: Variations on a Theme from Marie (orig. Almédon ou le monde renversé) in C major, Op. 82, D 908 (piano 4-hands)

== Edward Burlingame Hill ==
- Walter Piston: Variations on a Theme by E. B. Hill (orchestra; 1963)

== Johann Adam Hiller ==
- Max Reger: Variations and Fugue on a Theme by Hiller, Op. 100 (orchestra; 1904)

== Friedrich Heinrich Himmel ==
- Carl Czerny: Caprice and Variations on "An Alexis" by Himmel, Op. 62

== Paul Hindemith ==
- Luigi Ferdinando Tagliavini: Passacaglia su un tema di Hindemith (1953)
- Sir William Walton: Variations on a Theme by Hindemith (1962–1963)

== Johann Nepomuk Hummel ==
- Josef Gelinek: Variations on Hummel's Celebrated Waltz (piano, c. 1820)
- José Ignacio Quintón: Variations on a Theme of Hummel

== Anselm Hüttenbrenner ==
- Franz Schubert: 13 Variations on a theme by Anselm Hüttenbrenner, D. 576 (piano, the theme is from Hüttenbrenners first string quartet op. 3)

== Nicolas Isouard ==
- Johann Nepomuk Hummel: Variations on a March from Cendrillon in C major, Op. 40a (piano; c. 1811–12)

== Clément Janequin ==
- Jehan Alain: Variations sur un thème de Clément Janequin (organ; 1937)

== Joseph Joachim ==
- Ernest Walker: Variations on a Theme by Joseph Joachim (violin and piano; 1918)

== Zoltán Kodály ==
- Antal Doráti, Tibor Serly, Ödön Pártos, Géza Frid and Sándor Veress: Variations on a Theme of Zoltán Kodály (orchestra; 1962); the work was a joint collaboration between Kodály's composition pupils, for his 80th birthday celebration. The theme is taken from Kodály's String Quartet No. 1, Op. 2.

== Jean-Baptiste Krumpholz ==
- Carl Czerny: Variations concertantes on a Theme by Krumpholz, Op. 1 (piano and violin)

== Johann Kuhnau ==
- Hendrik Andriessen: Variations and Fugue on a Theme of Johann Kuhnau (string orchestra; 1935)

== Josef Labor ==
- Franz Schmidt: The finale of Schmidt's A major Clarinet Quintet is a set of Variations on a Theme by Labor

== Constant Lambert ==
- Alan Rawsthorne: Improvisations on a Theme of Constant Lambert (orchestra: 1960). The theme is from Tiresias

== Orlando di Lasso ==
- George Draga: Variations on a Theme of Orlando de Lasso (orchestra: 2007)
- Bernhard Krol: Lassus Variations, Op. 33 (viola and harpsichord or piano, 1962)

== Charles-Gaston Levadé ==
- Reynaldo Hahn: Variations sur un thème de Charles Levadé (piano 4-hands; 1892)

== Franz Liszt ==
- Chiel Meijering: Variation on a Variation by Franz Liszt on a Waltz Tune of Anton Diabelli (violin and viola; 2003)
- Wolfgang Stockmeier: Variations on a Theme of Franz Liszt from Via crucis (Stations of the Cross, S. 53) (cello and organ)

== Arthur de Lulli ==
- "Chopsticks": In 1880 a set of variations for piano 4-hands was written collaboratively by Alexander Borodin, César Cui, Anatoly Lyadov, Nikolai Rimsky-Korsakov, and Nikolai Shcherbachov, with a modest addition by Franz Liszt (S.256)
- Michael Cutler: "Variations on a Theme of Euphemia Allen," for solo piano (2013)

== Jean-Baptiste Lully ==
- Dieterich Buxtehude: Aria 'Rofilis' with 3 variations in D minor (on a Theme by Jean-Baptiste Lully), BuxWV 248

== Martin Luther ==
- Johann Sebastian Bach: Canonic Variations on "Vom Himmel hoch da komm' ich her"

== Stanyslav Lyudkevych ==
- Valeri Kikta: Romantic Variations on a Theme by Lyudkevich (harp; 1978)

== Cyrus McCormick ==
- Gunnar Johansen: Variations, Disguises, and Fugue, on a Merry Theme of Cyrus McCormick (orchestra; 1937; Note: McCormick was not a composer)

== Sir George Macfarren ==
- Dora Bright: Variations on an Original Theme of Sir G. A. Macfarren (piano duet; 1894)

== Sir Alexander Mackenzie ==
- Cedric Thorpe Davie: Variations on a Theme of A C Mackenzie, orchestra

== Guillaume de Machaut ==
- Jean-Jacques Grunenwald: Variations sur un thème de Machaut (harpsichord; 1957)
- Christopher Steel: Variations on a theme of Guillaume de Machaut (organ; Op. 65)

== Gustav Mahler ==
- Jan Klusák: Variations on a Theme of Gustav Mahler (1962)

== Heinrich Marschner ==
- Carl Czerny: Variations brillantes sur un thème favori de l'opéra Hans Heiling, Op. 341
- Robert Schumann: the final section of the Symphonic Studies, Op. 13, is a variation on the Romance "Du stolzes England freue dich" (Proud England, rejoice!), from Marschner's opera Der Templer und die Jüdin; the rest of the work is a set of variations and études on a theme by Baron von Fricken, a musical amateur (piano; 1834)

== Nikolai Medtner ==
- Bart Berman: Variations and Fugue on a Theme by Nikolai Medtner (based on the theme in Medtner's Theme with Variations, Op. 55) (2009)

== Étienne Méhul ==
- Henri Herz: Variations de bravoure sur la Romance de Joseph, Op. 20
- Johann Nepomuk Hummel: Variations in G major, Op. 14 (flute and piano; c. 1803)
- Franz Xaver Wolfgang Mozart: Five Variations on a romance from Méhul's Joseph, Op. 23 (1820).
- Louis Spohr: Variations on "Je suis encore dans mon printemps", Op. 36 (harp; 1807)
- Carl Maria von Weber: 7 Variations on "A peine au sortir de l'enfance" from Joseph, Op. 28, J. 141 (piano; 1812)

== Felix Mendelssohn ==
- Franz Liszt: Grosses Konzertstück über Mendelssohns Lieder ohne Worte (Grand Concertpiece on Mendelssohn's Songs Without Words), S. 257 (2 pianos, 1834)
- Václav Trojan: Humorous Variations on the theme of the "Spring Song", Op. 62/6 (from Songs Without Words) (orchestra; 1936, revised 1971)

== Giacomo Meyerbeer ==
- Louise Farrenc: Souvenir des Huguenots (Fantaisie et variations sur le célèbre choral de Luther, chanté dans Les Huguenots), Op. 19 (1836; arr. piano 4-hands, Op. 19 bis)
- Clemens von und zu Franckenstein: Variations on a Theme by Meyerbeer (orchestra)
- Adolf von Henselt: Variations on "Quand je quittai la Normandie" from Robert le diable, Op. 11 (piano and orchestra)
- Henri Herz: Variations brillantes sur le chœur favori d'Il crociato in Egitto, Op. 23 (piano)
- Friedrich Kalkbrenner: Duo et variations sur des motifs de Robert le Diable, Op. 111
- Franz Liszt: Fantasy and Fugue on the chorale 'Ad nos, ad salutarem undam', S.259 (organ): the adagio section includes a number of variations on the chorale theme, which is drawn from Meyerbeer's opera Le prophète.

== Thelonious Monk ==
- Gunther Schuller: Variants on a Theme of Thelonious Monk (13 instruments; 1960)
- " 'Round Midnight Variations ", a collection of variations on " 'Round Midnight ", composed by Roberto Andreoni, Milton Babbitt, Alberto Barbero, Carlo Boccadoro, William Bolcom, David Crumb. George Crumb, Michael Daugherty, Filippo Del Corno, John Harbison, Joel Hoffman, Aaron Jay Kernis, Gerald Levinson, Tobias Picker, Matthew Quayle, Frederic Rzewski, Augusta Read Thomas and Michael Torke

== Claudio Monteverdi ==
- Kit Armstrong: Variations on a Theme by Monteverdi (2007, piano)
- Art Ensemble of Chicago: Variations sur un thème de Monteverdi (1970)
- Marga Richter: Variations and Interludes on Themes from Monteverdi and Bach (concerto for violin, cello, piano and large orchestra; 1992)

== Wolfgang Amadeus Mozart ==
- Charles-Valentin Alkan: Fantaisie à 4 mains sur Don Juan (piano duet; 1844) - (Introduction, five variations on the aria from Don Giovanni "Venite par avanti", coda based on the aria "Finch' han del vino")
- B. Tommy Andersson: Variations on a Theme of Mozart (2 violins; arr. for 2 violas; 1984)
- Ludwig van Beethoven:
  - Variations on "Se vuol ballare" from The Marriage of Figaro, WoO 40 (piano and violin; 1792–3)
  - Variations on "La ci darem la mano" from Don Giovanni, WoO 28 (two oboes and English horn; ?1795)
  - Variations on "Ein Mädchen oder Weibchen" from The Magic Flute, Op. 66 (piano and cello; ?1795)
  - Variations on "Bei Männern welche Liebe fühlen" from The Magic Flute, WoO 46 (piano and cello; 1801)
- Nicolas-Charles Bochsa: Six variations for harp on "Voi che sapete" from The Marriage of Figaro.
- João Domingos Bomtempo: Variations on a Theme from The Magic Flute in G minor, Op. 21 (piano)
- Héctor Campos Parsi: Variations on a Theme of Mozart
- Frédéric Chopin: Variations on "Là ci darem la mano", Op. 2 (from Don Giovanni; piano and orchestra; 1827)
- Carl Czerny: Fantasy on The Marriage of Figaro, Op. 493 (Piano)
- Ferdinand David: Introduction et Variations sur un thème de Mozart in A major, Op. 11
- Hans Gál: Improvisation, Variations and Finale on a theme by Mozart for mandolin, violin, viola and liuto, Op. 60 (1934)
- Étienne-François Gebauer: 2 Airs variés de La Flute magique
- Joseph Gelinek
  - Eight variations on "Wie stark ist nicht dein Zauberton" from The Magic Flute. (keyboard).
  - 6 Variations on "Ein Mädchen oder Weibchen" from Die Zauberflöte (keyboard, c. 1800)
- Mikhail Glinka: Variations on a Theme from The Magic Flute in E♭ (piano, 1822)
- Aleksandr Goldenweiser: Variations on a Theme of Mozart, Op. 3, No. 1 (piano, 1940)
- Reynaldo Hahn: Variations sur un thème de Mozart (flute and piano; 1906)
- Heinrich von Herzogenberg: Variations on the Minuet from Don Giovanni, Op. 58 (piano)
- Johann Nepomuk Hummel: Variations on Mozart's opera, Op. 34/3
- Helene Liebmann: Third movement of her Cello Sonata in B♭ Major is a set of variations on "La ci darem la mano"
- Lowell Liebermann:
  - Variations on a Theme of Mozart Op. 42 (for two pianos)
  - Variations on a Theme of Mozart Op. 75 (orchestral version)
- George Malcolm: Variations on a Theme of Mozart (4 harpsichords)
- Henry Maylath: La ci darem Varied
- Franz Xaver Wolfgang Mozart: Variations on Minuet from Don Giovanni, Op. 2
- Max Reger: Variations and Fugue on a Theme by Mozart (orchestra)
- Anton Reicha:
  - 18 Variations and a Fantasy on a Theme by Mozart, Op. 51 (flute, violin and cello, 1804)
  - Sonata in F major (Variations on a Theme by Mozart) (piano)
- Nino Rota: Fantasy on twelve notes from "Non si pasce di cibo mortale chi si pasce di cibo celeste" from Don Giovanni (piano and orchestra)
- Georg Schumann: Variations on a Theme of Mozart, Op. 76 (piano)
- Fernando Sor: Introduction and Variations on a Theme by Mozart (guitar)
- Sigismond Thalberg:
  - Grande Fantaisie et Variations sur des motifs de l'opéra Don Juan, Op. 14
  - Grande Fantaisie sur la Sérénade et le Menuet de Don Juan, Op. 42

== Modest Mussorgsky ==
- Frederick Jacobi: Variations on a Theme by Mussorgsky (cello and piano)
- Josef Tal: Cum Mortuis In Lingua Mortua: 7 Variations on a Theme by Mussorgsky (piano; 1945)

== Alonso Mudarra ==
- Pedro Vilarroig: Variations on a Theme by Alonso de Mudarra (harp and string quartet)

== Wenzel Müller ==
- Ludwig van Beethoven: Kakadu Variations, Op. 121a (1803; piano trio)

== Neidhart von Reuental ==
- Marga Richter: Variations on a Theme by Neithart von Reuenthal (piano; 1974)

== Carl Nielsen ==
- John Gardner: Variations on a Waltz of Carl Nielsen, Op, 13
- Kjell Roikjer: Variations, Chorale and Fugue on a Theme by Carl Nielsen, Op. 51 (4 trombones)
- Robert Simpson: Variations on a Theme of Carl Nielsen (orchestra; 1983)
- David Starobin: Variations on a Theme by Carl Nielsen (2010)

== Jacques Offenbach ==
- Hans Haug: Variations on a Theme of Jacques Offenbach (orchestra)

== George Onslow ==
- Louise Farrenc: Variations brillantes sur un thème du Colporteur de G. Onslow, Op. 10 (piano; ca. 1828)
- Friedrich Kuhlau:
  - 8 Variations on "For The Girls", Op. 94 (flute and piano; 1829)
  - 8 Variations on "The Book Peddler, Or The Lumberjack's Son", Op. 99 (flute and piano; 1828)

== Seán Ó Riada ==
- Ronald Stevenson: A Rosary of Variations on Seán Ó Riada's Irish Folk Mass (piano; 1980)

== Sergio Ortega ==
- Frederic Rzewski: The People United Will Never Be Defeated!: 36 variations on the Chilean song "¡El pueblo unido jamás será vencido!" (piano; 1975)

== Johann Pachelbel ==
- George Frideric Handel: second movement of his Organ Concerto in G minor, Op. 7, No. 5, HWV 310, is a set of variations on Pachelbel's Canon
- George Rochberg: a movement from String Quartet No. 6 is a set of variations on Pachelbel's Canon
- Graham Waterhouse: Variations on a Theme of Pachelbel, Op. 6 (organ, 1981)
- See also List of variations on Pachelbel's Canon

== Ferdinando Paer ==
- Henri Herz: Variations et finale sur un air de ballet de F. Paer, Op. 29

== Niccolò Paganini ==
- Sergei Aslamazyan: Variations on a Theme by Paganini (string quartet; 1961)
- Leopold Auer: Arranged the Caprice No. 24 in A minor for violin with piano accompaniment, and added some variations of his own
- James Barnes: Fantasy Variations on a Theme by Niccolò Paganini (concert band; the theme is the Caprice No. 24)
- Boris Blacher: Variations on a Theme by Paganini (orchestra; 1947)
- Hans Bottermund: Variations on a Theme by Paganini (solo cello)
- Johannes Brahms: Variations on a Theme of Paganini, Op. 35 (piano; 1863)
- Alfredo Casella: Paganiniana (Casella) a Divertimento for orchestra Opus 65
- Carl Czerny: Grandes variations brillantes sur le thème original favori colla campanella (Glöckchen Rondo), Op. 170 (piano 4-hands)
- Luigi Dallapiccola: Sonatina canonica in mi bemolle maggiore su Capricci di Niccolò Paganini : per pianoforte (1946)
- Søren Nils Eichberg: Variations on a Theme by Niccolò Paganini (solo cello; 2005)
- Marc-André Hamelin: Variations on a Theme by Niccolò Paganini (piano: 2011)
- Stephen Heller: Thème de Paganini varié, Op. 1
- Joseph Horovitz: Variations on a Theme of Paganini (brass quartet; 1974)
- Timur Ismagilov: Variations on a Theme of Paganini (piano; 2002, rev. 2025)
- Gary Kulesha: Variations on a Theme by Paganini (trumpet and piano; 1974, rev. 1982)
- Lowell Liebermann: Rhapsody on a Theme of Paganini for piano and orchestra (2001)
- Franz Liszt: Grandes études de Paganini No. 3 and No. 6 (piano; 1851), revised from the earlier Études d'exécution transcendante d'après Paganini of 1838
- Andrew Lloyd Webber: 23 Variations (cello and rock band: 1977)
- Witold Lutosławski: Variations on a Theme by Paganini (2 pianos, 1941; piano and orchestra, 1978)
- Nathan Milstein: Paganiniana, an arrangement of the 24th Caprice, with variations based on the other caprices
- Robert Muczynski: "Desperate Measures" Paganini Variations, Op. 48
- Pavel Necheporenko: Variations on a Theme by Paganini (transcribed for unaccompanied balalaika)
- Frank Proto: Nine Variants on Paganini for Double Bass and Orchestra (2001; also for double bass and piano)
- Manuel Quiroga: 9 Variations on Paganini's Caprice No. 24 (violin and piano); 12 Variations on Paganini's Caprice No. 24 (violin and piano)
- Sergei Rachmaninoff: Rhapsody on a Theme of Paganini, Op. 43 (piano and orchestra; 1934)
- Poul Ruders: Paganini Variations (guitar and orchestra, 2000; solo version, 2002)
- Ehsan Saboohi: Metamorphosis on Theme of Paganini (piano; 2009)
- Fazıl Say: Paganini Variations (piano)
- Robert Schumann:
  - Etudes after Paganini Caprices, Op. 3 (1832)
  - Variationen zum Glöckchenthema (piano; unpub.)
- Konstantin Sorokin: Variations on a Theme by Paganini, Op. 62 No. 8 (piano)
- Sir George Thalben-Ball: Variations on a Theme by Paganini (pedal keyboard)
- Philip Wilby: Paganini Variations (wind band; brass band)
- August Wilhelmj: Einleitung, Thema mit Variationen nach Niccolo Paganini
- Rob Zuidam: Variations on a thema of Paganini (violin-solo)

See also Variations on a Theme of Paganini (disambiguation)

== Giovanni Paisiello ==
- Pierre Baillot: Air de Paisiello varié, Op. 19
- Ludwig van Beethoven:
  - 9 Variations on "Quant'e piu bello" from La molinara, WoO 69 (piano)
  - 6 Variations on "Nel cor più non mi sento" from La molinara, WoO 70 (piano)
- Theobald Boehm: Nel cor piu, Op. 4: Introduction and Variations on a Theme by Paisiello (flute and piano)
- João Domingos Bomtempo: Introduction, 5 Variations and Fantasy on Paisiello's favorite air, Op. 6 (piano)
- Wolfgang Amadeus Mozart: 6 Variations in F major on "Salve tu, Domine" from I filosofi immaginarii, K. 398 (piano)
- Niccolò Paganini: Introduction, Theme and Variations from Paisiello's La bella molinara ("Nel cor più non mi sento") in G major, Op. 38

== Giovanni Pierluigi da Palestrina ==
- George Draga: Variations on a Theme of Palestrina (orchestra; 2007)
- Richard Kearns:
  - Mirate Variations
  - Donna Gentil Variations (Por y Para Palestrina)

== Bernardo Pasquini ==
- Johann Speth: Variations on a Theme of Pasquini

== Giovanni Battista Pergolesi ==
- Igor Stravinsky: Suite on themes, fragments and pieces by Giambattista Pergolesi, for violin and piano (1925)

== Giuseppe Persiani ==
- Carl Czerny: Fantasy and Variations on Inês de Castro, Op. 377

== Astor Piazzolla ==
- Leo Brouwer: Variations on a Piazzolla Tango (guitar)
- Carlos Stella: Hockney's Choclo: 10 variations, imitations and paraphrases on Piazzolla's arrangement of the tango 'El choclo' after a picture by David Hockney (accordion, piano, violin, electric guitar and bass)

== Ildebrando Pizzetti ==
- Ronald Stevenson:
  - Variations on a Theme of Pizzetti (piano; 1955)
  - Variations on a Theme of Pizzetti (unaccompanied violin; 1961)
  - (The above 2 works are based on the same Pizzetti theme, but are otherwise unrelated)

== Ignaz Pleyel ==
- Johann Nepomuk Hummel: Variations on a Rondo of Pleyel, Op. 3/1
- Franz Krommer: Trio in F: Variations on a Theme by Pleyel (two oboes and English horn; often known as “Ben 338”)
- (see also Johannes Brahms: Variations on a Theme by Haydn, which theme was possibly the work of Pleyel)

== Manuel Ponce ==
- Carlos Posada: Variations on Manuel Ponce's "Estrellita" (violin and viola; pub. 1995)

== John Powell ==
- Daniel Gregory Mason: Variations on a Theme of John Powell (string quartet, 1924–25)

== Henry Purcell ==
- Victor Babin: Variations on a Theme of Purcell (cello and piano)
- Benjamin Britten: The Young Person's Guide to the Orchestra (Variations and Fugue on a Theme of Purcell), Op. 34 (1946)
- Jeremy Filsell: Wondrous Machine: Variations on a Theme of Purcell (narrator and organ)
- Magnus Lindberg: Bright Cecilia: Variations on a Theme by Purcell (orchestra; 2002)
- Walter Niemann: Kleine Variationen über eine alt-irische Volksweisen, Op. 146 (piano; 1936); in a footnote he acknowledges the theme is Lilliburlero [sic] by Purcell
- Ronald Stevenson: Simple Variations on Purcell's "New Scotch Tune" (piano; 1964; set for clarinet and strings 1967; rev and enlarged 1975 as Little Jazz Variations on Purcell's "New Scotch Tune")
- Rafał Stradomski: Purcell Variations (soprano saxophone or oboe and piano; 1997)

== Sergei Rachmaninoff ==
- Gheorghi Arnaoudov: Variations on a Theme by Rachmaninoff (orchestra; 2001)
- Richard Kearns:
  - Variations on Rachmaninoff's 3rd Piano Concerto
  - Variations on a Prelude by Rachmaninoff

== Jean-Philippe Rameau ==
- Paul Dukas: Variations, Interlude and Finale on a Theme by Rameau (piano)
- Anthony Hedges: Variations on a Theme of Rameau
- Howard Skempton: Rameau Variation (piano)

== Carl Reinecke ==
- Reynaldo Hahn: Variations puériles sur une mélodie de Reinecke (piano 4-hands; 1905)

== Django Reinhardt ==
- Leo Brouwer: Variations on a Theme of Django Reinhardt (guitar; 1984)

== Vincenzo Righini ==
- Ludwig van Beethoven: 24 Variations on the Aria "Venni Amore", WoO 65 (piano)

== Nikolai Rimsky-Korsakov ==
- Jehan Alain:
  - Variations sur un thème donné de Rimsky-Korsakov (4 voices)
  - Variations sur un chant donné de Rimsky-Korsakov (organ)
  - Variations sur un thème donné de Rimsky-Korsakov (string quartet)
- Kaikhosru Shapurji Sorabji: "Il gallo d'oro" da Rimsky-Korsakov: variazioni frivole con una fuga anarchica, eretica e perversa (variations and fugue on a theme from Le Coq d'Or)

== Pierre Rode ==
- Carl Czerny: La Ricordanza: Variazioni sopra un tema di Rode, Op. 33 (piano)

== Gioachino Rossini ==
- Ferdinando Carulli: Fantaisie avec variations sur des airs de La gazza ladra, Op. 197
- Frédéric Chopin (spurious)
  - Variations on "Non più mesta" from La Cenerentola, B. 9, KK. Anh. Ia/5, A 1/5 (flute and piano)
- Napoléon Coste
  - Introduction et variations sur un motif de Rossini (guitar)
- Carl Czerny:
  - Introduction et Variations sur la marche favorite della Donna del Lago, Op. 20
  - Brilliant Variations on the favorite Tyrolienne in Guillaume Tell, Op. 220 (piano)
  - Fantasie and Variations brillantes on the March from Moises, Op. 504
- Louise Farrenc: Variations brillantes sur un thème de La Cenerentola, Op. 5 (piano)
- Joseph Gelinek: Variations pour le Forte-Piano sur la Cavatine "Di tanti palpiti" de l' Opera Tancredi. (piano). Published by Schotts, Mainz, c. 1817.
- Henri Herz:
  - Variations brillantes sur la cavatine favorite de Donna del Lago, Op. 17
  - Variations brillantes sur la marche favorite de Moïse, Op. 42 (violin and piano)
  - Grandes variations sur le "Choeur des Grecs" du Siège de Corinthe, Op. 36
  - Grandes variations sur une marche favorite de Guillaume Tell, Op. 50 (piano 4-hands)
  - Variations de concert sur une marche favorite de Guillaume Tell, Op. 57 (piano and orchestra)
  - Variations on "Non più mesta" from La Cenerentola, Op. 60
  - Variations on the March from Otello, Op. 67
  - Variations brillantes and Finale à la hongroise from Matilde di Shabran, Op. 77
- Friedrich Kalkbrenner
  - Fantaisie et variations brillantes sur l'air "Di tanti palpiti", Op. 83
  - Variations sur un air de Le comte Ory, Op. 92 (piano)
- Friedrich Kuhlau:
  - 4 Variations on "Give Calm, O Heaven" from Otello, Op. 58 (1823: piano 4-hands)
  - Variations on William Tell, Op. 116 (piano; 1831)
- Franz Liszt:
  - 7 Variations brillantes sur un thème de G. Rossini, S.149 (piano; 1824?)
- Bohuslav Martinů: Variations on a Theme of Rossini, H. 290 (cello and piano)
- Niccolò Paganini:
  - Introduction and Variations on a Theme from La Cenerentola ("Non più mesta")
  - Introduction and Variations on a Theme from Moses ("Dal tuo stellato soglio")
  - Introduction and Variations on a Theme from Tancredi ("Di tanti palpiti")

== Jean-Jacques Rousseau ==
- Friedrich Kalkbrenner: Variations on a Theme by Rousseau, Op. 23 (piano)

== Camille Saint-Saëns ==
- Géza Frid: Variations on "The Elephant" from The Carnival of the Animals (scordatura double bass and string orchestra, 1977)
- Philip Sparke:
  - Symphonic Metamorphosis on themes from Saint-Saëns' 3rd Symphony (concert band; 2007)
  - Saint-Saëns Variations - A Symphonic Metamorphosis of Themes from the 'Organ' Symphony (brass band; 2009)

== Antonio Salieri ==
- Ludwig van Beethoven: 10 Variations on "La stessa, la stessissima" from Falstaff, WoO 73 (piano)
- Jan Ladislav Dussek: Variations on a Theme by Salieri, Craw 83 (keyboard; lost)
- Joseph Gelinek: VIII Variations pour le Piano-Forte sur le Trio "Copia si tenera" de l' Opera Palmira. (Published c. 1797)
- Wolfgang Amadeus Mozart: 6 Variations in G major on "Mio caro Adone" from La fiera di Venezia, K. 180 (piano)
- Giuseppe Sarti: Variations for Violin and piano on the Cavatina "La ra la ra" from La Grotta di Trofonio (1786)
- Joseph Wölfl: 9 Variations sur le Duo "La stessa, la stessissima" de l'opéra Falstaff ossia Le tre Burle pour le Fortepiano, WoO 15

== Giovanni Battista Sammartini ==
- Tivadar Nachéz: Passacaglia on a Theme of Sammartini

== Gaspar Sanz ==
- Joaquín Nin-Culmell: 8 Variations on a Theme by Gaspar Sanz (orchestra)

== Giuseppe Sarti ==
- Wolfgang Amadeus Mozart: 8 Variations in A major on "Come un agnello" from Fra i due litiganti il terzo gode, K. 460 (piano)

== Erik Satie ==
- Israel Sharon: Variations on a Theme by Satie (piano and chamber orchestra)

== Benedikt Schack ==
- Wolfgang Amadeus Mozart: 8 Variations in F major on the song "Ein Weib ist das herrlichste Ding" from the Singspiel Der dumme Gartner, K. 613 (piano)

== Arnold Schoenberg ==
- Giles Brindley: Variations on a Theme by Schoenberg
- David Lewin: Classical Variations on a Theme by Schönberg, for cello and piano
- Luigi Nono: Variazioni canoniche sur la serie de l'opus 41 de Schönberg for orchestra (1950)
- Viktor Ullmann: Variationen und Doppelfuge über ein Klavierstück von Arnold Schönberg (op. 19/4), Op. 3a (versions for piano; Geneva version with 5 variations 1929, Prague version with 9 variations 1933–34); as Variationen, Phantasie und Doppelfuge über ein kleines Klavierstück von A. Schönberg, Op. 3b (orchestra, 1933); Op. 3c (version for string quartet, 1939)

== Franz Schubert ==
- Tony Aubin: Variations on a Theme of Franz Schubert, ballet (1953)
- Carl Czerny:
  - Variations on the Trauer-Walzer D. 365/2, Op. 12
  - Drey brillante Fantasien über die beliebtesten Motive aus Franz Schubert's Werken, Op. 339 (piano and physharmonica; 2 pianos; horn and piano)
- Edison Denisov: Variations on a Theme of Schubert (cello and piano; 1986)
- Leopold Godowsky: Passacaglia, in the form of 44 variations, cadenza and fugue, on the opening theme of Schubert's "Unfinished" Symphony (piano; 1927)
- Lee Hoiby: Schubert Variations, op. 35a (piano; 1981; theme is no. 3 of 17 German Dances, D. 366)
- Helmut Lachenmann: Fünf Variationen über ein Thema von Franz Schubert (German dance in C♯ minor D 643) (Piano; 1956)
- Lowell Liebermann:
  - Variations on a Theme of Schubert Op. 92 for Wind Ensemble (2005)
  - Variations on a Theme of Schubert Op. 100 for solo piano (2007)
- Emil Reesen: Variationer over et tema af Schubert (1928)
- Robert Schumann: Sehnsuchtswalzervariationen (piano; unpub.)
- Adrien-François Servais: Fantaisie et variations brillantes sur la valse de Schubert, intitulée Le Désir, Op. 4 (cello and piano; cello and orchestra)
- Leone Sinigaglia: 12 Variations on a Theme by Franz Schubert, Op. 19 (oboe and piano)
- August Wilhelmj: Einleitung, Thema mit Variationen nach Franz Schubert
- Various: Variations on a Waltz by Schubert, a work commissioned by the Seraphim Trio, written collabaratively by Andrew Ford, Ian Munro, Calvin Bowman, Raymond Chapman-Smith, Joe Chindamo, Andrea Keller, Elena Kats-Chernin and Roger Smalley (piano trio; 2009)

== William Schuman ==
- Robert Starer: The Fringes of a Ball: Waltz Variations on a Theme by William Schuman (2 pianos)

== Clara Schumann (née Wieck) ==
- Robert Schumann:
  - Impromptus on a Theme by Clara Wieck, Op. 5 (1833)
  - the third movement of the Piano Sonata No. 3 in F minor, Op. 14 (1836) is a set of variations on a Theme by Clara Wieck

== Robert Schumann ==
- Johannes Brahms:
  - Variations on a Theme by Robert Schumann in F♯ minor, Op. 9 (piano solo; 1854)
  - Variations on a Theme by Robert Schumann, Op. 23 (1861; piano four-hands)
- Vincenzo di Donato: Variations on a Theme of Robert Schumann (viola or cello and piano; 1921)
- Stephen Heller: Variations on a Theme of Schumann, Op. 142 (the theme is "Warum?", Op. 12/3, from Fantasiestucke)
- Robert E. Jager: Variations on a Theme by Robert Schumann (wind ensemble; 1968)
- Maurice Ravel: Variations on a Theme of Schumann (piano; 1888; the theme was the Choral "Freu dich, o meine Seele" from Album for the Young, Op. 68) (lost)
- Clara Schumann: Variations on a Theme of Robert Schumann, Op. 20 (1854)

== Alexander Scriabin ==
- Leonid Sabaneyev: Variations on a Theme of Scriabin (unknown forces)
- Alexandre Tansman: Variations on a Scriabin Theme (guitar)

== John Stafford Smith ==
- Dudley Buck: Concert Variations on "The Star-Spangled Banner", Op. 23

== Kaikhosru Shapurji Sorabji ==
- Mervyn Vicars: Introduction, Variations and Fugue on a Theme of Sorabji for Pianoforte and Orchestra (1973; unpublished)

== Beatrice Sosnik ==
- Irma Urteaga: Variations on a Theme of Beatrice Sosnik (1997)

== John Philip Sousa ==
- Carlos Stella: The Indian Post: a piece for wind orchestra based on a march by Sousa after a south Indian form (2006)

== Louis Spohr ==
- Friedrich Kuhlau: 8 Variations on Jessonda, Op. 101 (flute and piano; 1829)

== Daniel Steibelt ==
- Charles-Valentin Alkan: Variations on a Theme from Steibelt's "Orage" Concerto, Op. 1 (Note: This is the Piano Concerto No. 3 in E, subtitled "L'orage")

== Johann Strauss II ==
- Józef Koffler: Variations sur une valse de Johann Strauss, Op. 23 (piano; 1935)
- Adolf Schulz-Evler: "Arabesques", Variations on The Blue Danube Waltz, Op. 12

== Igor Stravinsky ==
- Carlos Stella: Pastiches, Parodies and Variations on two themes by Stravinsky and Berio (piccolo clarinet, trombone, xylorimba and vibraphone)

== Franz Xaver Süssmayr ==
- Ludwig van Beethoven: 8 Variations on "Tandeln und scherzen" from Soliman II, WoO 76 (piano)

== Jan Pieterszoon Sweelinck ==
- John Bull: Variations on a Theme by Sweelinck
- Karl Höller: Sweelinck Variations ("Mein junges Lebe hat ein End"), Op. 56 (1950/51)
- Ton de Leeuw: Sweelinck Variations

== Thomas Tallis ==
- Philip Sparke: Tallis Variations (brass band; 1999)
- Ralph Vaughan Williams: Fantasia on a Theme by Thomas Tallis (strings; 1910, rev. 1913, 1919)

== Francisco Tárrega ==
- Agustín Barrios: Variations on a Theme of Tárrega (guitar)

== Giuseppe Tartini ==
- Yuri Kasparov: Devil's Trills: Variations on a Theme of Tartini (16 performers; 1990)

== Pyotr Ilyich Tchaikovsky ==
- Anton Arensky: Variations on a Theme by Tchaikovsky, Op. 35a (strings; 1894)
- Boris Blacher: Rokoko-Variationen: Variations on a Theme by Tchaikovsky (cello and piano; 1974)
- Johan de Meij: Extreme Make-Over - Metamorphoses on a Theme by Tchaikovsky (brass band, 2004; wind orchestra, 2006; fanfare, 2009)

== Georg Philipp Telemann ==
- Max Reger: Variations and Fugue on a theme of Telemann, Op. 134 (piano; 1914)
- Rafał Stradomski: Telemann Variations (harpsichord or piano or harp; 1995)

== Yann Tiersen ==
- Ben Emberley: Variations on "Comptine d'un autre été", Op. 44 (piano; 2015)

== Ralph Vaughan Williams ==
- Cheryl Frances-Hoad: Rhapsody on a Theme by Ralph Vaughan Williams for orchestra (1997)

== Giuseppe Verdi ==
- Hans von Bülow: Arabesques en forme de variations sur un thème favori de l'opéra Rigoletto, Op. 2 (c. 1855; "Caro nome")
- Adolfo Fumagalli:
  - Quatres airs de ballet variés from Verdi's opera Jérusalem, Op. 23 (piano)
    1. Pas de quatre
    2. Pas de deux
    3. Pas seul
    4. Pas d'ensemble
  - Introduction et grande adagio variées sur la terzette "Qual volutta trascorrere" (from I Lombardi alla prima crociata), Op. 75
  - Introduction et adagio varié on the romanza "Sempre all'alba ed alla sera" from Giovanna d'Arco, Op. 89 (piano)
  - Melodia variata on La traviata (on the aria of Germont's father, "Di Provenza il mar"), Op. 98 (1854)
- Jim Hiscott: Variations on a Theme of Giuseppe Verdi (1983, rev 1985)
- Stanislaus Verroust: Fantaisie et Variations sur Il corsaro, Op. 54 (oboe and piano)

== Georg Joseph 'Abbé' Vogler ==
- Carl Maria von Weber:
  - 8 Variations on a Theme from Castor and Pollux, Op. 5, J. 40 (piano; 1804)
  - 6 Variations in C on a Theme from Samori, Op. 6, J. 43 (piano; 1804)

== Richard Wagner ==
- William Bergsma: Fantastic Variations on a Theme from Tristan und Isolde (viola and piano; 1961)
- Alexey Voytenko: "Schmachtend". Variations on a theme of Wagner (piano; 2003)

== Count Ferdinand von Waldstein ==
- Ludwig van Beethoven: 8 Variations on a Theme by Count Waldstein, WoO 67 (piano 4-hands)

== Sir William Walton ==
- David Morgan: Variations on a Theme of Walton (orchestra; 1981–84)
- Robert Saxton: Sonata on a Theme of Sir William Walton (solo cello; 1999)

== Carl Maria von Weber ==
- Carl Czerny:
  - Einleitung: Variations and Rondo on Hunting Chorus from Euryanthe, Op. 60 (piano and orchestra, 1824)
- Henri Herz:
  - Variations brillantes sur la dernière valse de C. M. Weber, Op. 51
  - Grandes variations sur le Choeur des Chasseurs d'Euriante, Op. 62
- Paul Hindemith: Symphonic Metamorphosis of Themes by Carl Maria von Weber (orchestra; 1943). The third movement, Andantino, is a set of variations; the other movements are cast in symphonic forms.
- Friedrich Kuhlau:
  - 10 Variations on a folk song from Der Freischütz, Op. 48 (piano; 1822)
  - Variations on 6 Themes from Der Freischütz, Op. 49 (piano; 1822)
  - Variations on 3 Themes from Euryanthe, Op. 62 (piano: 1824)
  - 6 Variations on Euryanthe, Op. 63 (flute and piano: 1824)
- Felix Mendelssohn and Ignaz Moscheles: Fantasy and Variations on the "Gypsy March" from La Preziosa (two pianos and orchestra; 1833; Moscheles later made an arrangement for two pianos alone, an arrangement that Mendelssohn barely recognised. Despite this, the work was often attributed to Mendelssohn alone.)
- Robert Schumann: Variation zum Preziosamarsch (piano; unpub.)
- Sigismond Thalberg:
  - Fantaisie et variations sur des différens motifs de l'opéra Euryanthe de C. M. v. Weber, Op. 1

== Joseph Weigl ==
- Pierre Baillot: Air de Weigl varié, Op. 28
- Josef Gelinek: Variations sur Pria ch'io l'impegno (from L'amor marinaro) (keyboard, 1798).
- Ignaz Moscheles: Air favori de Weigl: "Wer hörte wohl jemals mich klagen" (from Die Schweizer Familie), 12 Variations, Op. 5 (piano)
- Niccolò Paganini: Sonata con variazioni on a Theme from Joseph Weigl

== Peter Winter ==
- Ludwig van Beethoven: 7 Variations on "Kind, willst du ruhig schlafen" from Das unterbrochene Opferfest, WoO 75 (piano)

== Hugo Wolf ==
- Michael Hersch: Variations on a Theme of Hugo Wolf (chamber orchestra or full orchestra; 2004)

== Paul Wranitzky ==
- Ludwig van Beethoven: 12 Variations on the "Russian Dance" from the ballet Das Waldmädchen, WoO 71 (piano)

== Frank Zappa ==
- Lukáš Hurník: Variations on Frank Zappa's Theme (two saxophones and orchestra)
