= Variations on a Theme of Paganini (disambiguation) =

Variations on a Theme of (by) Paganini may refer to:

- Variations on a Theme by Paganini by Sergei Aslamazyan
- Fantasy Variations on a Theme by Niccolò Paganini by James Barnes
- Variations on a Theme by Paganini by Boris Blacher
- Variations on a Theme by Paganini by Hans Bottermund
- Variations on a Theme of Paganini, Op. 35 by Johannes Brahms
- Variations on a Theme by Niccolò Paganini by Søren Nils Eichberg
- Thème de Paganini varié, Op. 1 by Stephen Heller
- Variations on a Theme of Paganini by Joseph Horovitz
- Variations on a Theme of Paganini by Timur Ismagilov
- Variations on a Theme by Paganini by Gary Kulesha
- Variations on a Theme by Paganini by Witold Lutosławski
- Variations on a Theme by Paganini by Pavel Necheporenko
- Variations on a Theme by Paganini by Marc-André Hamelin
- Nine Variants on Paganini by Frank Proto
- Paganini Variations by Poul Ruders
- Paganini Variations by Fazıl Say
- Variations on a Theme by Paganini by George Thalben-Ball
- Paganini Variations by Philip Wilby
- Variations (Andrew Lloyd Webber album)
- Rhapsody on a Theme of Paganini by Sergei Rachmaninoff

== See also ==
- Fantasia for piano in C major "Souvenir de Paganini" by Johann Nepomuk Hummel
- Grandes études de Paganini by Franz Liszt
- Rhapsody on a Theme of Paganini by Lowell Liebermann
- Rhapsody on a Theme of Paganini, Op.43 by Sergei Rachmaninoff
- Souvenir de Paganini by Frédéric Chopin
