= Variations and Fugue on a Theme by Mozart =

- by Max Reger
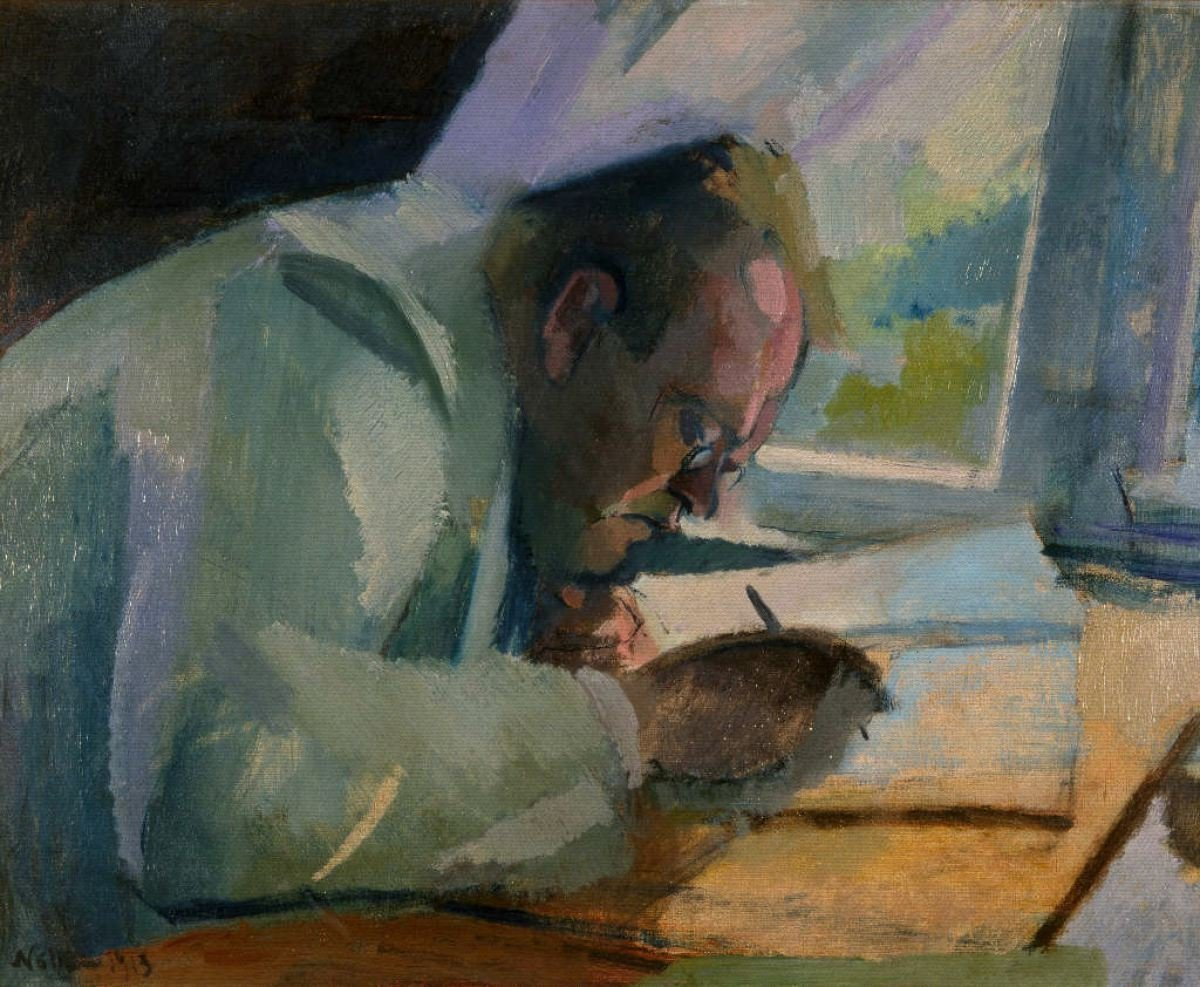
- The composer in 1913, painting by Franz Nölken
- Opus: 132
- Composed: 1914
- Performed: 5 February 1915
- Scoring: orchestra

The Variations and Fugue on a Theme by Mozart, Op. 132, is a set of variations for orchestra composed in 1914 by Max Reger; the composer conducted the premiere in Berlin on 5 February 1915. He later produced a version for two pianos, Op. 132a, where the Variation 8 ("Moderato") is completely different.

== Description ==
The theme is drawn from the first movement of Wolfgang Amadeus Mozart's Piano Sonata in A, K. 331, and is first presented by the oboe and two clarinets before being repeated by strings. Its second part appears again in the oboe and clarinet supported by high strings, and then is again repeated by the string section. Eight variations follow; then the fugue, in which the subject appears first in first violins before being answered after eight bars by the second violins. The piece concludes with a final, forceful statement of the theme by trumpets and horns.

=== Movements ===
The work, which takes about 33 minutes to perform, consists of the following movements:

1. Theme. Andante grazioso
2. Variation 1. L'istesso tempo, quasi un poco più lento
3. Variation 2. Poco agitato
4. Variation 3. Con moto
5. Variation 4. Vivace
6. Variation 5. Quasi presto
7. Variation 6. Sostenuto (quasi adagietto)
8. Variation 7. Andante grazioso
9. Variation 8. Molto sostenuto
10. Fugue. Allegretto grazioso

It is scored for piccolo flute, two concert flutes, two oboes, two clarinets, two bassoons, four French horns, two trumpets, timpani, harp, string section.

== Critical reaction ==
This remains the composer's most popular and most-recorded orchestral work, although during the later 20th century it largely disappeared from the concert hall. It has obvious antecedents in Johannes Brahms' Variations on a Theme by Haydn both in terms of the inspiration theme (both draw from a simple melodic phrase) and the subsequent style of variation. Many critics, however, have remained lukewarm to the piece as little more than Brahmsian pastiche.

== See also ==
- List of variations on a theme by another composer
