= Variations on "Gott erhalte Franz den Kaiser" (Czerny) =

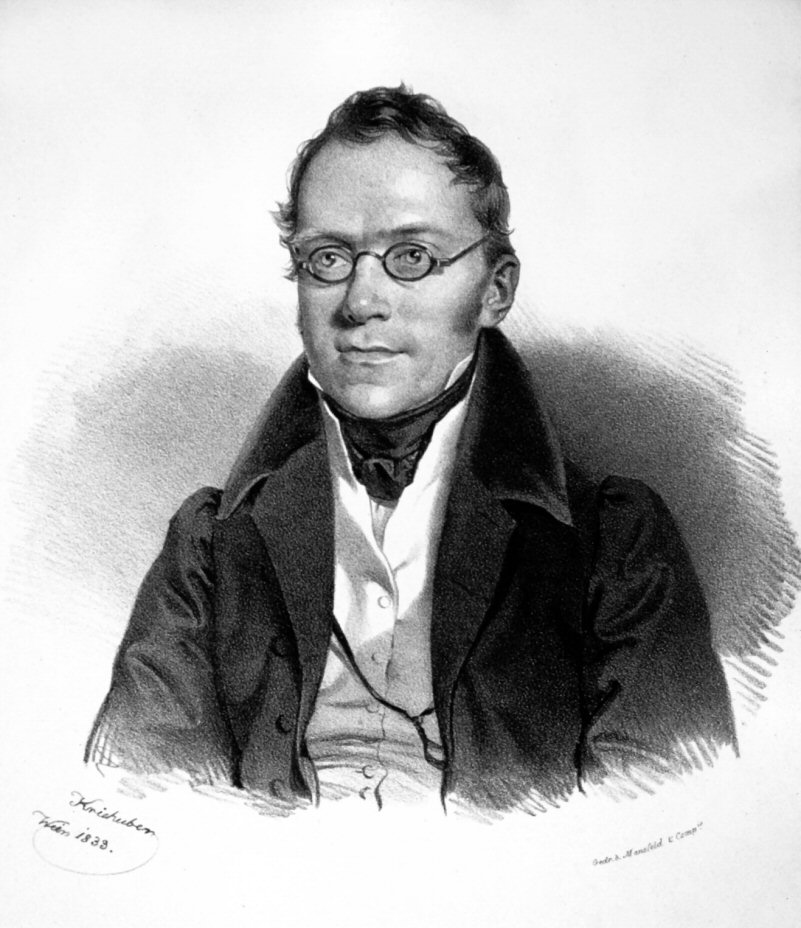
Carl Czerny in 1833

Carl Czerny's Variations on "Gott erhalte Franz den Kaiser", Op. 73, also known as Variations on a Theme of Haydn and Variations on the Emperor's Hymn, were written in 1824. There are versions for piano and string quartet and piano and orchestra.

The work was first performed by the composer in 1824. It lasts about 27 minutes and is structured as follows:

- Introduction (Adagio ma non troppo)
- Thema
- 5 Variations
- Adagio espressivo
- Finale.

Both the introduction and the animated finale are said to be reminiscent of Czerny's teacher Ludwig van Beethoven, all of whose piano works he is said to have memorised. The composer of the theme, Joseph Haydn, was, in turn, Beethoven's teacher.

Its sole orchestral recording appears to be the 1968 recording by Felicja Blumental, with the Vienna Chamber Orchestra under Helmuth Froschauer. The version for piano and string quartet was recorded by pianist Maureen Jones with the Kammermusiker Zürich in 1985 and released in 1986.

== See also ==
- List of variations on a theme by another composer
