= Introduction and Variations on a Theme by Mozart =

1821 composition by Fernando Sor

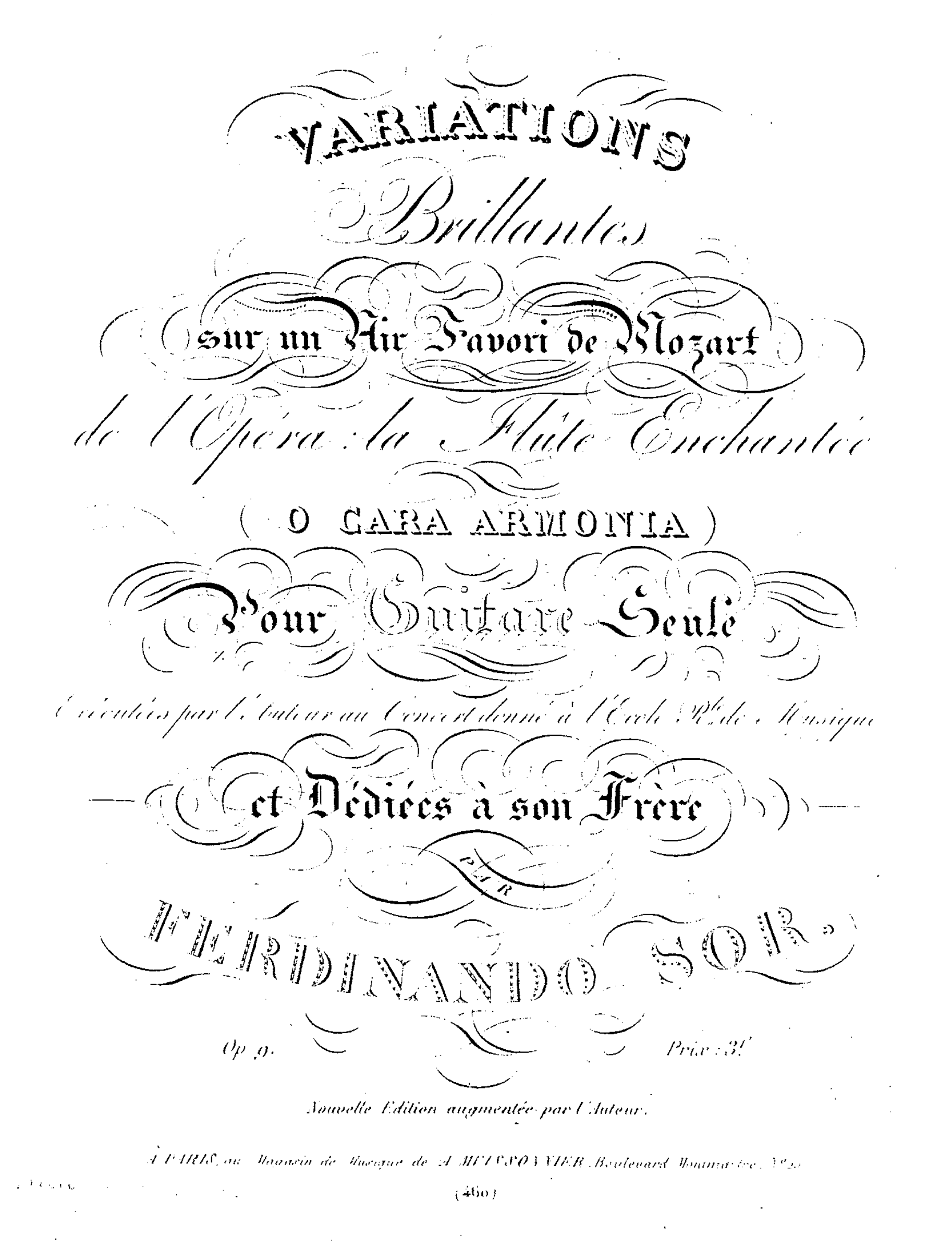
Original cover of Sor's Variations on a Theme of Mozart, Op. 9, published in Paris in 1821

Introduction and Variations on a Theme by Mozart, Op. 9, is one of Fernando Sor's most famous works for guitar. It was first published in London in 1821 and dedicated to Sor's brother Carlos.

== Editions ==
The title page of the first edition includes the line Exécutées par l'Auteur au Concert donné à l'Ecole R^{le} de Musique [As performed by the author, at the Royal School of Music]. The French edition was published by Antoine Meissonnier, dated roughly in the same period, and had four instead of the original five variations, no coda, and some differing notes. It is thought that this version could have been a simplification of the original work. However, in 1826 or 1827, Meissonnier brought out another version, this one identical to the London first edition.

== Composition ==
Comparison of Mozart's and Sor's themes

This piece embodies Fernando Sor's best characteristics as a composer, requiring great technique. It is a frequently performed piece that serves as a "testing ground for every aspiring guitarist" As Brian Jeffrey, author of the largest Sor biography to date, wrote of this piece and Op. 7, the Folies d'Espagne, (Note: Jeffrey's opus numbering which he draws from Meissonnier; normally: Op. 7 is 'Fantasy No. 2', and 'Folies d'Espagne' is Op. 15a.) "no space is wasted and the music devotes itself not to 'guitaristic' effects but only to itself".

The work is based on a melody from Mozart's opera The Magic Flute. The opera was first performed in Vienna, 1791, and in German, while the first performances in Italian took place in 1794, so Sor could have feasibly written the piece any time since then. However, it is more likely that he was inspired to write the piece when the first major production was premiered in England in May 1819, when Sor was in the area.

The theme and the variations are based on one that was used in numerous composer's arrangements, some being by the flutist Drouet, by Henri Herz, and by Mikhail Glinka. It is the theme played near the end of act 1 as Papageno charms the slaves of Sarastro with his magic chimes. The theme is called "Das klinget so herrlich", in Italian either translating to "O dolce concento", "O dolce armonia", or, as Sor chose to use, "O cara armonia". This last translation was also used in the vocal score of The Magic Flute published in Birchall, London in around 1813.

Sor's theme differs somewhat from Mozart's original, as may be seen in the comparison above/right. The time and key signatures of the originals have been changed and repeats deleted to better make the comparison. None of the bars (measures) are exactly the same but most only differ slightly.

== See also ==
- List of variations on a theme by another composer

== Notes and references ==
Notes
