= Carlos Stella =

Argentine composer

Carlos Stella (born 1961 in Buenos Aires) is an Argentine composer.

== Training and career ==
Self-taught in composition, Stella studied piano at the Buenos Aires National Conservatory of Music and in 1985 he was invited by Krzysztof Penderecki to the Cracow Academy of Music. Back in Buenos Aires he received other scholarships from the Fondo Nacional de las Artes and the Fundación Antorchas and began to work for the Teatro del Sur with director Alberto Félix Alberto. He lives in Berlin, Germany, since 1999.

His style is notable for combining multiple elements of heterogeneous musical traditions like gagaku, Noh and kabuki, sequences and tropes, ragam thanam pallavi, baroque and rococo, kebyar, military bands, Thai piphat, circus music, gamelan, organa, tango, Tibetan ritual music, etc. and for exploring the possibilities of variation, imitation, parody, montage, transcription, copy, quotation, paraphrase, trope and recurrence. Typical is also his use of ideas like kaleidoscope, labyrinth, mosaic, spiral, echo and mirror.

== Works ==
- the frog, the moon, buddha and I, after haiku by Basho, Issa, Buson and Shiki, for female voice and piano
- transformation of an own theme in another one by beethoven for three horns
- pieces for orchestra with mirrors and a countertenor
- trio: or, commedia for oboe, bass trumpet and tuba
- quartet: pastiches, parodies and variations on two themes by stravinsky and berio for piccolo clarinet, trombone, xylorimba and vibraphone
- sinfonia containing various themes which may or may not be recognized by the listener; with many parodies, imitations, variations and mere repetitions affecting them for 31 players
- duetto: a parody, a transcript and an imitation of beckett for bassoon and cello
- hockney's choclo: 10 variations, imitations and paraphrases on piazzolla's arrangement of the tango 'el choclo' after a picture by david hockney for accordion, piano, violin, electric guitar and bass
- adieu à venise, after a poem by Georges Perec, for female voice and accordion
- klavierstück in form eines aus mehreren ab- und umwandlungen, übertragungen und nachahmungen bekannter und unbekannter motive zusammengesetzten mosaiks for piano
- the Indian post: a piece for wind orchestra based on a march by sousa after a south Indian form
- 15 movements from la muerte en marcha for orchestra
- brahms im spiegelkabinett, for piccolo, violoncello and piano
- warum rauchst du so viel, lili? based on a play by Tennessee Williams, for accordion and piano
- after all, vinnie, I am your mother! (a piece for two soloists and continuo, a string trio and kagebayashi), for English horn, trumpet, guitar, violin, viola, violoncello, countertenor and piano
- antigonai, an oper based on fragments by sophocles and hölderlin for three choirs and a women's trio
- 30 lieder a cappella für eugenia visconti

== Music for theatre, film and video ==
- tango varsoviano and en los zaguanes ángeles muertos by Alberto Félix Alberto
- europa y el toro by Tulio Stella directed by Alberto
- tres obras breves y modernas by Tulio Stella
- dos piezas breves de samuel beckett by César Repetto
- tríptico de exilio by Sergio de Loof
- clowns by Daniel Gentile
- la pasión según san juan by Narcisa Hirsch
- mañana by Lilian Morello
- billard um halb zehn by Manfred Dörner
