= Caprice No. 24 (Paganini) =

Classical violin piece by Paganini

Kyoko Yonemoto playing Caprice No. 24 in A minor (4:52)

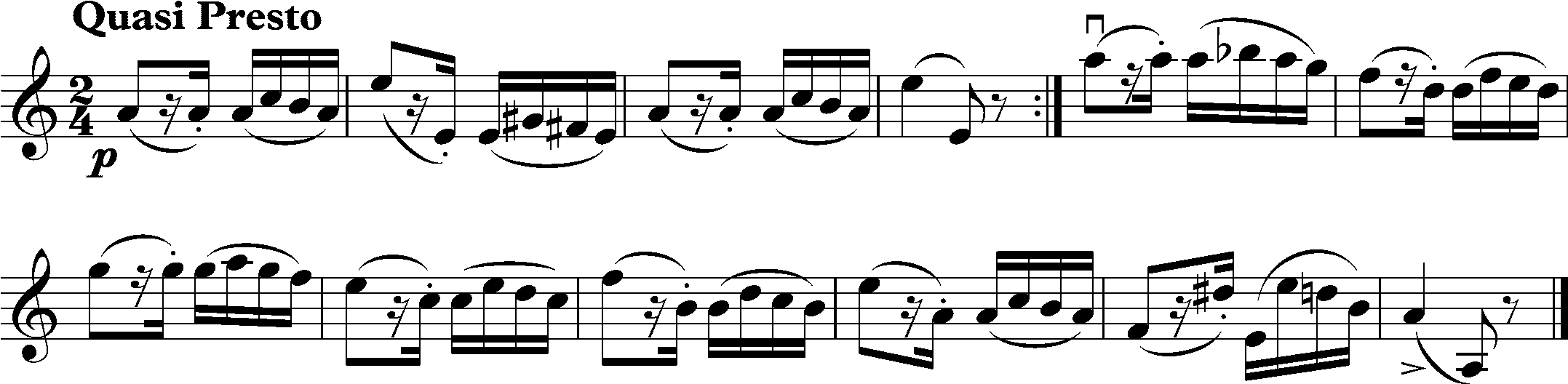
Theme

Caprice No. 24 in A minor is the final caprice of Niccolò Paganini's 24 Caprices, and a famous work for solo violin. The caprice, in the key of A minor, consists of a theme, 11 variations, and a finale. His 24 Caprices were probably composed between 1802 and 1817, while he was in the service of the Baciocchi court.

It is widely considered one of the most difficult pieces ever written for the solo violin. It requires many highly advanced techniques such as parallel octaves and rapid shifting covering many intervals, extremely fast scales and arpeggios including minor scales, left hand pizzicato, high positions, and quick string crossings. Additionally, there are many double stops, including thirds and tenths.

Caprice No. 24
Performed by Yehudi Menuhin (violin) and Adolph Baller (piano)

== Variations on the theme ==
The caprice has provided material for works by subsequent composers. Compositions based on it, and transcriptions of it, include:

- Angra – used as the main theme for an interlude on electric guitar on the song Angels Cry, from the album of the same name
- Aria – used as a basis for the main riff in the song Igra s ognyom (Playing with Fire) from the 1989 album of the same name. The song is about a fictional violinist based on Paganini
- Leopold Auer – arranged it for violin with piano accompaniment, and added some variations of his own
- Rafał Augustyn – Paganini Variations, for solo piano (1987–1989) (reference: www.polmic.pl)
- Luc Baiwir – Variations on a Theme by Paganini, for solo piano (2007)
- David Baker – Ethnic Variations on a Theme of Paganini, for violin and piano
- BanYa – Caprice of Otada is based on Rachmaninoff's Rhapsody on a Theme of Paganini and is used in Pump it Up NX2
- Alison Balsom – recorded a version transcribed for trumpet
- James Barnes – Fantasy Variations on a Theme by Niccolo Paganini, a wind band arrangement with each variation as a solo for a particular section
- Boris Blacher – Variations on a Theme by Paganini (1947), for orchestra
- Hans Bottermund – Variations on a Theme by Paganini, for cello solo
- Johannes Brahms – Variations on a Theme of Paganini, Op. 35 (1862–63), for solo piano (2 books)
- Charles Camilleri – Paganiana, for two pianos
- Frédéric Chopin – quotes Niccolò Paganini's Caprice No. 24 in his Rondo à la Krakowiak and includes a variation on the quotation
- Eliot Fisk – transcribed all 24 Caprices for solo guitar
- First Piano Quartet – Variations on a Theme of Paganini, for four pianos, eight hands
- Ignaz Friedman – Studies on a Theme of Paganini, Op. 47b (1914), for solo piano
- David Garrett – Paganini Rhapsody (2007)
- Benny Goodman – Caprice XXIV
- The Great Kat – adapted the 24th Caprice for electric guitar
- Mark Hambourg – Variations on a Theme of Paganini (1902), for solo piano
- Marc-André Hamelin – Variations on a Theme by Paganini, for solo piano (2011)
- Helloween – used in the opening guitar solo of Future World on the High Live album
- Toshi Ichiyanagi – Paganini Personal, for marimba and piano
- In Flames – the introduction of the song Foregone, Pt. 2 from the album Foregone
- Wiktor Łabuński - Four Variations on a Theme by Paganini for piano solo
- Lowell Liebermann – Rhapsody on a Theme of Paganini, for piano and orchestra (2001)
- JJ Lin – Variation 25: Clash of The Souls, a song from album Lost N Found (2011)
- Franz Liszt – the sixth and last of his Études d'exécution transcendante d'après Paganini for solo piano, S.140 (1838) – revised and republished in 1851 as Six Grandes Études de Paganini, S.141
- Andrew Lloyd Webber – Variations (1977), Variations (album) originally for cello and rock band, and used as the theme for The South Bank Show, later also arranged for cello and orchestra; Song & Dance – the Dance part is a reworked version of Variations
- David Ludwig – Violin Concerto No. 2: Paganiniana, (2018) for violin and Pierrot Ensemble
- Witold Lutosławski – Variations on a Theme by Paganini, for two pianos (1940–41) or for piano and orchestra (1978)
- Yngwie Malmsteen – used the main theme for an interlude on electric guitar on the song Prophet of Doom, from his album War to End All Wars
- Denis Matsuev – Caprice No. 24 variations, Denis Matsuev Quartet, jazz (2010)
- Mikhail Mchedelov – Variations on a Theme of Paganini for solo harp
- Nathan Milstein – Paganiniana, an arrangement for solo violin of the 24th Caprice, with variations based on the other caprices
- Robert Muczynski – Desperate Measures Paganini Variations, Op.48
- Pavel Necheporenko – Variations on a Theme by Paganini transcribed for unaccompanied balalaika
- Jeff Nelsen – Performed Caprice No. 24 on French Horn with Canadian Brass
- Gregor Piatigorsky – Variations on a Paganini Theme, for cello and orchestra (1946), later arranged for cello and piano
- Simon Proctor – Paganini Metamorphasis, for solo piano
- Frank Proto – Capriccio di Niccolo for Trumpet and Orchestra (1994). Nine Variants on Paganini for Double Bass and Orchestra, also for Double Bass and Piano (2001). Paganini in Metropolis for Clarinet and Wind Symphony (2001), also for Clarinet and Orchestra (2002)
- Manuel Quiroga – 9 Variations on Paganini's Caprice No. 24, 12 Variations on Paganini's Caprice No. 24, both for violin and piano
- Sergei Rachmaninoff – Rhapsody on a Theme of Paganini, Op. 43 (1934), a set of 24 variations for piano and orchestra
- George Rochberg – 50 Caprice Variations for solo violin (1970)
- Alexander Rosenblatt – Variations on Theme of Paganini, for solo piano (1988)
- Poul Ruders – Paganini Variations: Guitar Concerto No. 2 (1999–2000), 22 variations for guitar and orchestra. Ruders later transcribed the guitar part for piano for his Piano Concerto No. 3.
- Fazıl Say – Paganini Jazz in Say Plays Say, for solo piano (1988)
- Stanisław Skrowaczewski – Concerto Nicolò, for piano left hand and orchestra (2003)
- Karol Szymanowski – No. 3 from Trzy kaprysy Paganiniego (3 Caprices de Paganini), Op. 40 (1918); transcriptions for violin and piano
- George Thalben-Ball – Variations on a Theme of Paganini, theme and 10 variations for Pipe organ. All except the last variation are for solo organ pedals
- Philip Wilby – Paganini Variations, for both wind band and brass band
- Victor Wooten – Classical Thump, A Show Of Hands
- Eugène Ysaÿe – Variations on Paganini's Caprice No. 24, for violin and piano, Op. posthumous
