= Six Variations on "Hélas, j'ai perdu mon amant" =

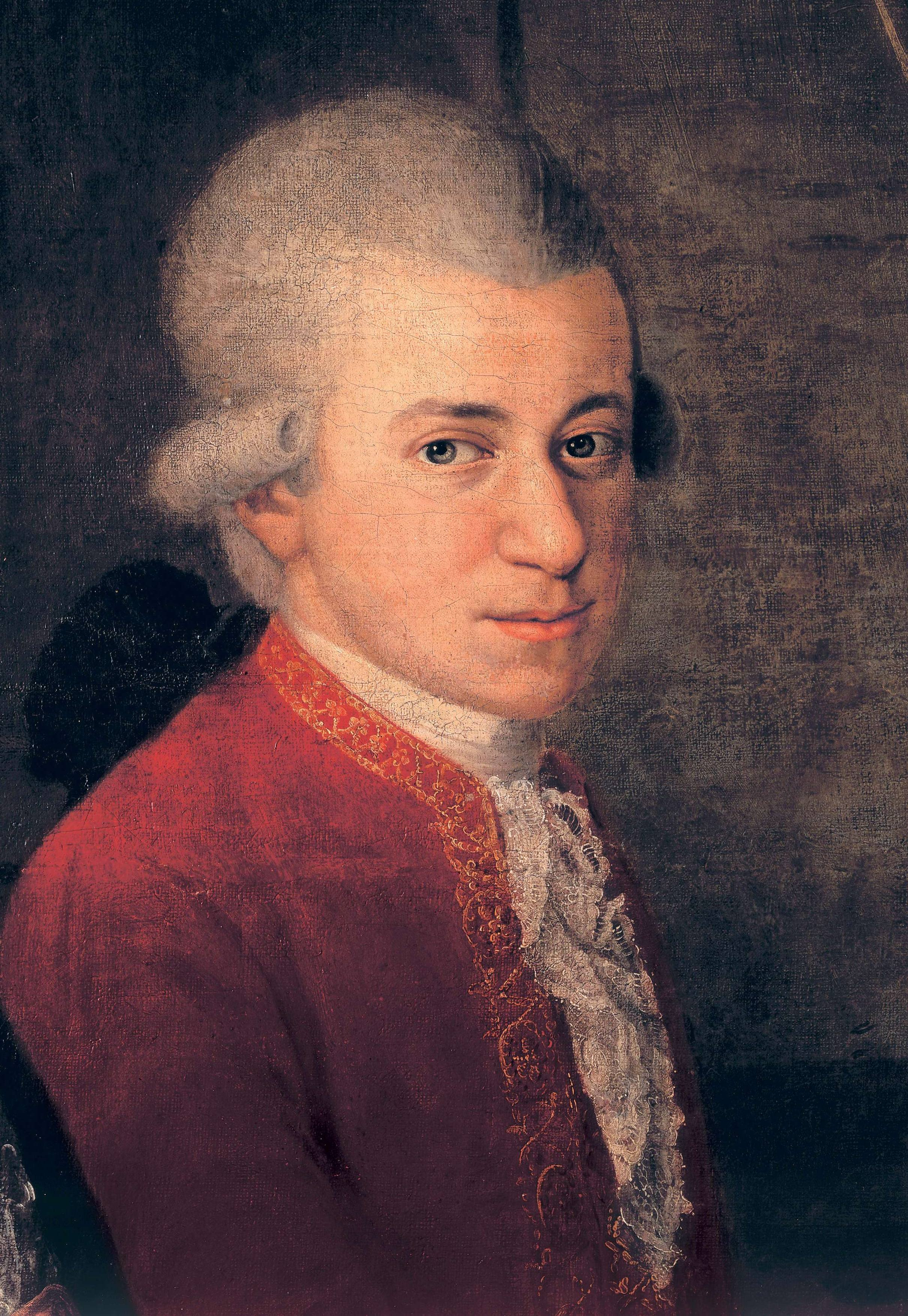
Detail of Wolfgang from the 1780–81 Portrait of the Mozart Family

Six Variations on "Hélas, j'ai perdu mon amant", K. 360/374b, is a composition in G minor for piano and solo violin by Wolfgang Amadeus Mozart, composed when he was 25 years old (June 1781).

The six variations are nominally on a French ariette, "Hélas, j'ai perdu mon amant" ("Alas, I have lost my lover") by Antoine Albanèse (1729–1800), an Italian-born French castrato singer and composer. However, it appears that Mozart misnamed the melody used, which was actually entitled "Au bord d'une fontaine" ("By the edge of a fountain"). The Neue Mozart-Ausgabe points out that no French tune bearing the title "Hélas, j'ai perdu mon amant" ever existed. The melody also existed far earlier in France than Albanèse's version, since at least the sixteenth century.

It is thought to have been written for Mozart's first piano student in Vienna, Marie Karoline, Countess Thiennes de Rumbeke (1755–1812), a cousin of Philipp von Cobenzl.

== See also ==
- List of variations on a theme by another composer
