= Joseph Gelinek =

Czech-born composer and pianist

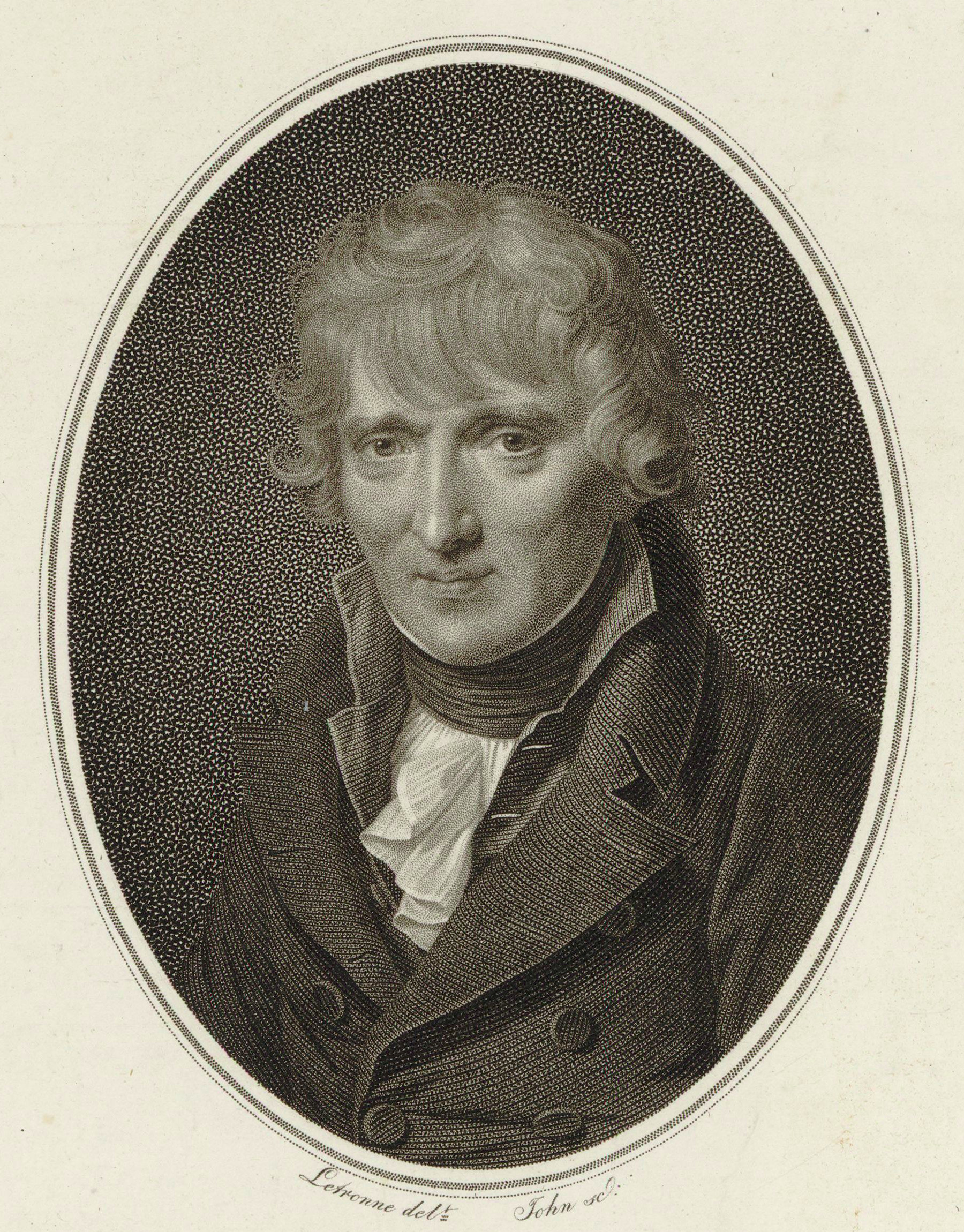
Joseph Gelinek

Joseph Gelinek (3 December 1758 – 13 April 1825) was a Czech-born composer and pianist, living in Vienna for most of his career. He was known particularly for composing piano variations.

== Life ==
Gelinek was born on 3 December 1758 in Sedlec in the present-day Czech Republic. He attended a Jesuit school in Příbram, and studied organ and composition with Josef Seger. He was ordained as a priest in 1786.

Wolfgang Amadeus Mozart met Gelinek while in Prague for a performance of his opera Don Giovanni (first performed there in 1787); through his recommendation, Gelinek was appointed chaplain and keyboard teacher at the court of Count Kinsky. After about two years, Gelinek accompanied the Count's family to Vienna, where he was in the service of Prince Joseph Kinsky. He stayed there for 13 years.

In Vienna, he studied counterpoint with Johann Albrechtsberger. He was known as a piano virtuoso and was in great demand in Vienna as a piano teacher. Mozart valued his piano improvisations.

He first met Ludwig van Beethoven at an evening reception in which he was asked to compete with the piano playing of Beethoven. Gelinek afterwards said, "I have never heard anyone play like that! He improvised on a theme which I gave him as I never heard even Mozart improvise.... He can overcome difficulties and draw effects from the piano such as we couldn't even allow ourselves to dream about."

Gelinek composed a great deal, mostly for the piano, and was particularly known for his piano variations; he wrote one for the Vaterländischer Künstlerverein project organised by Anton Diabelli. He was most popular from about 1800 to 1810. He died in Vienna on 13 April 1825, aged 76.
