= Narcisa Hirsch =

Argentine filmmaker (1928–2024)

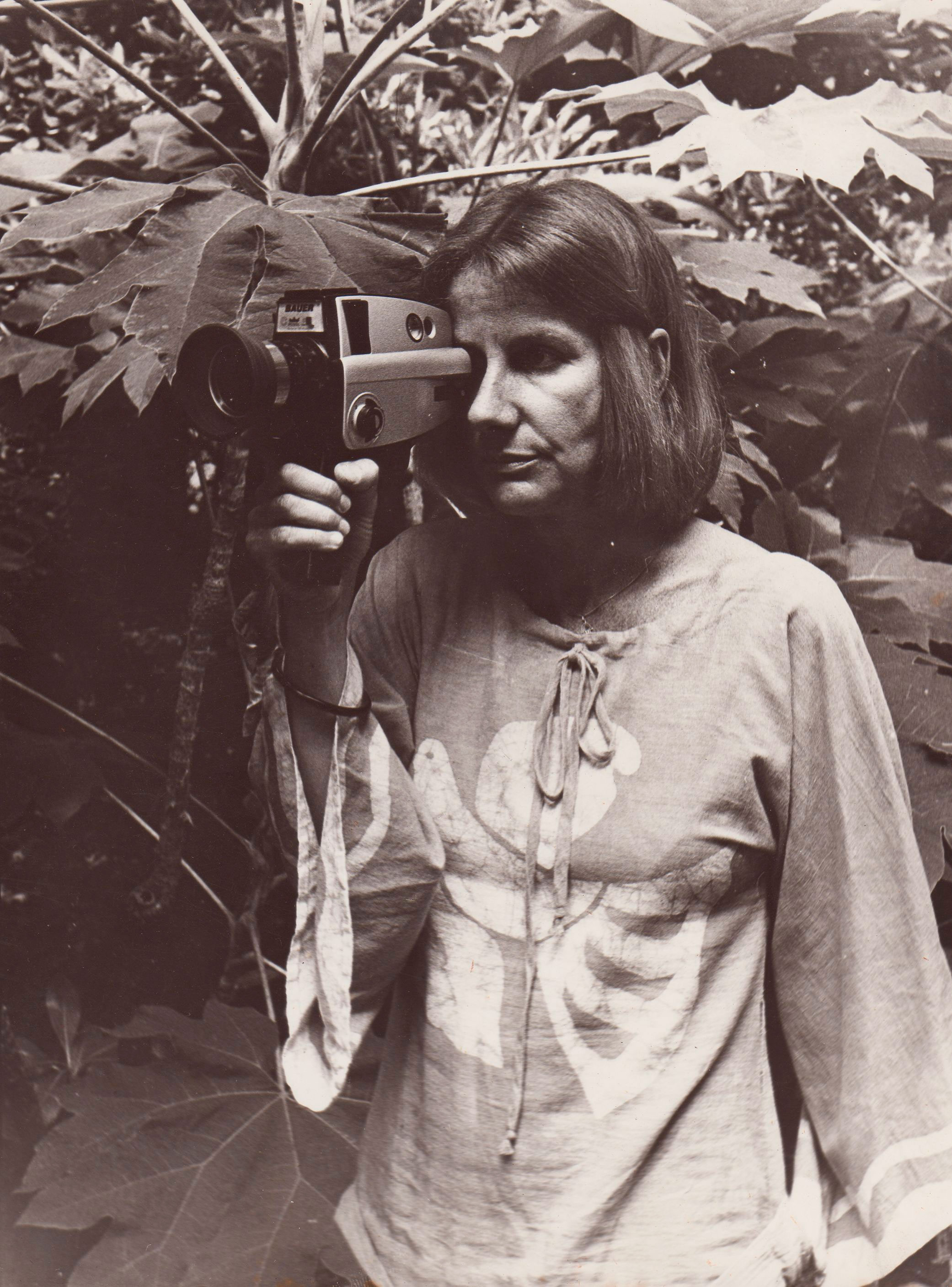
- Narcisa Hirsch in the 1970s
- Born: Narcisa Heuser; February 16, 1928; Berlin, Germany
- Died: May 4, 2024 (aged 96); Buenos Aires, Argentina
- Occupations: Experimental filmmaker, performance artist, writer
- Awards: Platinum Konex Award (2022)

Narcisa Hirsch (née Heuser, 16 February 1928 – 4 May 2024) was an Argentine experimental filmmaker of German birth. Her work centered on themes of the body, love, sex, death, movement and the female gaze. Despite this focus on women, she resisted being labeled as a feminist.

She began as a painter, but her later and better known work centers on performance and film, though she also wrote several books. She cited Salvador Dalí and Luis Buñuel as influences on her experimental film work, as well as the Bauhaus artists of Germany.

During her time as an experimental filmmaker in Argentina, she frequented the Di Tella Institute and the Goethe Institute, a place where many of her works premiered.

Latterly, her work was honored through several retrospectives at international film festivals, though it was relatively unknown outside of exclusive circles when it first premiered. She won the Platinum Konex Award from Argentina in 2022.

== Biography ==
=== Childhood ===
Hirsch was born Narcisa Heuser in Berlin, Germany, in 1928, to Heinrich Heuser and a German-Argentinian mother. Her father left her and her mother when Hirsch was five. Heuser was an Expressionist painter, and Hirsch would explore this medium first when she began making art. She grew up in Tyrol, but was sent to a school in Vienna at the age of 8 with no prior education. At 9 she and her mother visited Argentina, which turned into a much longer stay than intended when World War II broke out. They officially emigrated in 1937.

=== Adulthood ===
In 1950, Hirsch married Paul Hirsch, a German Jew from Frankfurt, adopted his surname, and raised three children with him. She joined an avant-garde group consisting of Claudio Caldini, Juan José Mugni, Juan Villola, Horacio Valleregio and Marie Louise Alemann, where Hirsch's focus was on bringing art to the people through performance. She and Alemann were co-leaders of the group. Her group often was at arms with similar groups in Buenos Aires, often inciting arguments with other groups that morphed into Happenings. Her work as an artist began in the organization of these happenings, the most notable being Manzanas and La Marabunta. Because her group of experimental filmmakers was accepted by neither the politically active filmmaking groups nor the commercial groups, it mostly escaped notice during the bloody uprisings in the late seventies in Argentina. The group was highly resourceful and experimental, shooting and projecting wherever and whenever they could, once projecting their films on the back of a white rabbit. Because of the highly experimental nature of their work, traditional gallery spaces shied away from the group, all except the Goethe Institute, who gave them a formal place to screen their work. Though she was well educated, she did not receive any formal training in film.

== Work ==
Hirsch began her work as an artist in painting and drawing, though she did do some work in wood carving and prints. She later shifted to performance art, and transitioned to experimental film after working on editing footage from one of her performance pieces. During the 70's, during Argentina's brutal dictatorship, she also took to the streets, posting political graffiti.

=== Performance ===
La Marabunta was performed in 1967 by both she and the other members of the group she was a part of. Consisting of a giant female skeleton covered in fruit and stuffed with live pigeons, Hirsch became interested in the idea of filmmaking when she sought out filmmaker Raymundo Gleyzer to record the act of passersby removing the fruit, metaphorically and physically devouring the female body, specifically a pineapple which she placed at the sex of the skeleton. It was performed at the El Coliseo Theater.

=== Film ===
Hirsch became interested in film after filming the creative process of La Marabunta, and its respective performances. After becoming interested in film, Hirsch traveled to New York and began to explore New American Cinema, and attending classes at the MOMA. In her time in New York, she also explored the Anthology Film Archives.

She worked in 16mm and on Super 8 film because their inexpensive prices allowed her to make non-commercial film. She fell into a group of filmmakers that included Marie Louise Alemann, Claudio Caldini, Horacio Vallereggio, Juan Villola, and Juan José Mugni. They rarely screened their works in traditional venues, with the exception of the Goethe Institute, which allowed them the creative freedom they desired. This group often earned the name "Groupo Goethe" because of the patronage of the Goethe Institute.

In 1976, Hirsch won a contest from UNCIPAR with her film Come Out, which consists of two shots of a record player. In the first, through manipulation of the lens and the lighting, the record player is slowly revealed, and the second features an overhead stagnant shot of the record. It was scored to the Steve Reich piece of the same name, and included a voice saying "come out to show them" over and over with increasing confusion. Meant to produce a sense of disorientation in the viewers, it was negatively perceived by critics, who had yet to appreciate experimental film. Regardless, she took first prize at the contest. In that same year, she met her mentor Werner Nekes while studying at the Goethe Institutes of Buenos Aires. At this time, she also began using mostly Super 8 camera.

Another of her works, Taller was similarly minimalist. It featured a single shot of a wall of her studio, while she verbally describes what the viewer sees. Then, she goes on to describe the other unseen parts of her studio, creating a personal work similar to many of her earlier works. Though there is only one shot, the viewer can tell the camera is moving because of fluctuations in light and shadow. Throughout the film's 11-minute run time, Hirsch continuously narrates, revealing deeper truths and personal stories behind the objects depicted on the screen.

Hirsch has an extended body of work beyond these pieces, including Diarios Patagónicos (1972–73), Taller (1975), Testamento y Vida Interior (1977), Homecoming (1978), Ama-zona (1983), A-Dios (1989), Rumi (1999), Aleph (2005), and El Mito de Narciso (2011). She has directed several dozen more films, and began to receive critical recognition of her work from several international film festivals in the 2010s. She has been screened all over the world, including in Los Angeles at The Hammer Museum. Her work is also part of the traveling exhibit started at The Hammer called "Radical Women: Latin American Art 1960 - 1985".

=== Publications ===
When Super 8 film became obsolete, Hirsch turned to writing, publishing several books in Argentina. These books are La Pasión Segun San Juan, El Silencio, El Olvido del Ser, LA Filosofía es una Pasion Inútil, and Aigokeros.

== Death ==
Hirsch died on 4 May 2024, at the age of 96.

== Exhibitions ==
- Galoria Lirolay (for painting)
- Insituto de Arte Moderno
- Instituto Torcuato Di Tella
- 2010: La Casa de Bicentario
- 2018: "Radical Women: Latin American Art 1960 - 1985", The Hammer

== Retrospectives ==
- 2010: Museo de Arte Latinoamericano de Buenos Aires
- 2012: Viennale (Vienna International Film Festival)
- 2012: Buenos Aires Festival Internacional de Cine Independiente
- 2013: Toronto International Film Festival
- 2017: Documenta, Athens
