= Rafał Stradomski =

Polish composer

Rafał Stradomski (born 13 October 1958 in Warsaw, Poland) is a Polish composer of contemporary classical music, pianist and writer.

== Early life and education ==
Stradomski studied composition with Professor Tadeusz Paciorkiewicz at the Fryderyk Chopin Academy of Music in Warsaw. He holds a degree in oboe. In 1986, Stradomski received two awards in composition: the Young Composers' Competition, for his Wind Quintet; and the G. Fitelberg Competition for his A tre for a large symphony orchestra. In 1992–93, Stradomski was awarded a grant by the French Government and studied at the École Normale de Musique in Paris.

== Style ==
In his compositions, Stradomski seeks new solutions in the domain of construction rather than new effects in sound. In some works, he employs serialist or dodecaphonic techniques. He draws on the experience of aleatorism and uses elements of jazz, combining them with different composing techniques that he invented (often for the use of a single work). In 1984–2001, he organised concerts (of contemporary music as well) at the Warsaw Music Society. He is also a performing artist, playing old and contemporary music on the oboe and, in more recent times, on the piano.

== Literary works ==
In 1995, Stradomski debuted as a writer. He wrote six books: The Sexual Life of Moomintrolls, The View From a Room Without Windows, Russian Watch or Eternal Love, All President’s Girl-Friends, The President’s Return, The President’s Secret and four theater plays: The Lawn, The Godfather’s son, The Dolt and The Contrabassoonist.

== Musical works ==
- Trio for reed instruments (oboe, clarinet, bassoon) (1981)
- String Quartet (1982–83)
- MCXIII, for saxophone (1983)
- Three Quite Rhythmic Compositions, for piano (1983)
- Fugue for piano (1984)
- Clarinet Concerto (1984–85)
- Prelude and Fugue, Improvisation for solo flute (1984)
- Theme for piano (commissioned by the Warsaw National Museum for the opening of the 'Polish Formists' exhibition) (1985)
- Sonata for clarinet and piano (1985)
- Wind Quintet (1986)
- A tre for a large symphony orchestra (1986)
- Ricercar for recorder quartet (commissioned by the ancient instrument ensemble Ars Nova) (1986)
- Ballad of a Lonely Pump for voice and piano (1986)
- Sonata for alto saxophone and piano (1986–87)
- Introduction and Fugue for chamber orchestra (1987)
- For R. for tenor saxophone and piano (1987)
- Canzona I and Canzona II for four cromornes or other wind instruments (1987)
- 6-8-7 for a large symphony orchestra (1987–88)
- 555 for saxophone quintet (1988)
- Per Gato for alto or tenor saxophone and piano (1988)
- Trio for oboe, alto saxophone and cello (commissioned by Serge Bichon, General Secretary of the Association pour l’Essor du Sahophone de France) (1989)
- Passacaglia for flute and piano (1989)
- Prelude for piano (1989)
- Concerto for alto saxophone and orchestra (1989–90)
- Three preludes for piano (1990)
- Sonatina for solo saxophone or oboe or bassoon (1990)
- Twelve Black and White Symmetrical Compositions for piano (1991)
- Chaconne (inspired by G. F. Handel) (1992)
- Sonata for cello and piano (1992)
- Three Characteristic Compositions for saxophone or oboe (1993)
- La Foglia, for piano (1993)
- Scherzo for piano (1993)
- Capriccio for solo violin (1993)
- Four Miniatures for piano (1993-4)
- Four Songs (1994)
- Rondeau for piano (1994)
- Three Gloomy Pieces, for clarinet and piano (1995)
- II Sonata for alto saxophone and piano (1995)
- Telemann Variations for harpsichord or piano or harp (1995)
- B-A-C-H, a study for piano (1996)
- Missa Latina, for mixed choir (1997)
- Fantasia per chitarra (1997)
- Purcell Variations for sopran saxophone or oboe and piano (1997)
- Concerto for piano, saxophone quartet and strings (commissioned by John Paul's II Foundation Brussels) (1998)
- Three Love Songs for voice and piano (author text) (1998)
- II String Quartet D minor (1999)
- Agnus Dei for voice and organ or string quartet or recorder sextet (1999)
- Black Despair for cello or viola and piano (2000)
- Largo, variations on Chopin's theme for piano (2000)
- Elegy for bassoon and piano (2002)
- Ballada o prokuratorze for voice and piano (author text) (2002)
- Notturno, Variations on Chopin's theme for piano (2004)
- Symphonic Rhapsody Ukraine (2004-5)
- 4 Little Variations for piano (2006)
- Notary’s march, for piano (2007)
- Summer Afternoon, for piano (2007)
- Mazowsze, 5 Piano Pieces (2008)
- Beethoven Variations, for piano (2008)
- Bulgarian Rhapsody, for a large symphony orchestra (2008)
- Korea, 3 Pieces for piano (2008)
- Pezzo un po triste, for piano (2008)

== Recordings ==
- 1994: Raphael Stradomski: Concerto for saxophone and orchestra, Sonata, Sonatina, Per Gato Krzysztof Herder, Romuald Matecki, Polish Radio Symphony Orchestra, Boguslaw Madey. Felix Victor FVCD 01
