= Variations on a Theme of Paganini =

Piano work by Johannes Brahms

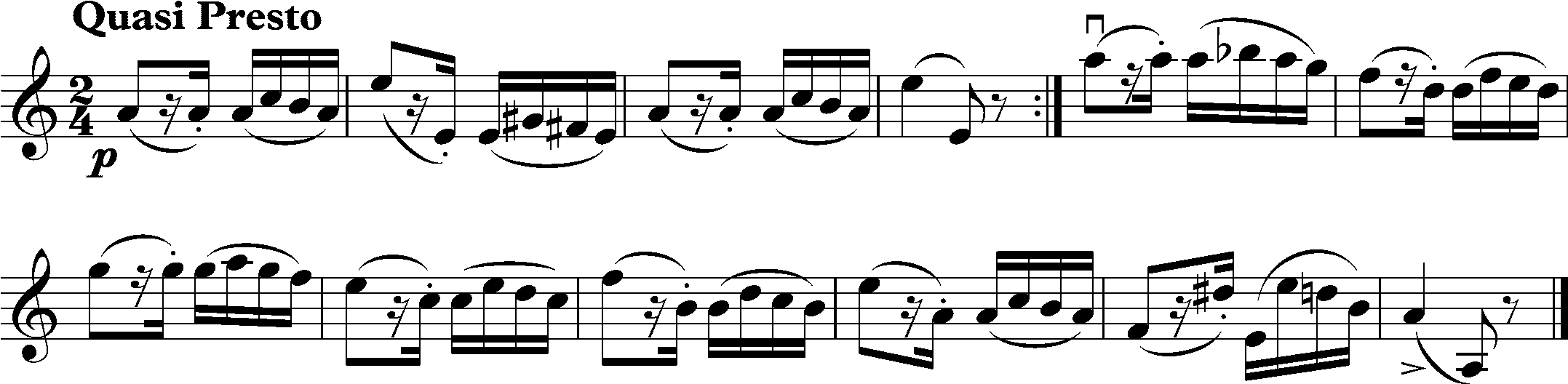
Paganini's theme

Variations on a Theme of Paganini, Op. 35, is a work for piano composed in 1863 by Johannes Brahms, based on the Caprice No. 24 in A minor by Niccolò Paganini.

== Structure ==
The work consists of two books. Each book opens with the theme, Paganini's Caprice No. 24 in A minor, followed by fourteen variations. The final variation in each section is virtuosic and climactic.

Brahms intended the work to be more than simply a set of theme and variations; each variation also has the characteristic of a study. He published it as Studies for Pianoforte: Variations on a Theme of Paganini. The work was dedicated to the piano virtuoso Carl Tausig. It is well known for its harmonic depth and extreme physical difficulty. A particular emphasis of the technical challenges lie on hand independence, with the left hand often mirroring the right hand throughout the piece or having its own set of obstacles.

David Dubal describes it as "a legend in the piano literature," and "fiendish," "one of the most subtly difficult works in the literature." Clara Schumann called it Hexenvariationen (Witch's Variations) because of its difficulty. Dubal quotes critic James Huneker:

“Brahms and Paganini! Was ever so strange a couple in harness? Caliban and Ariel, Jove and Puck. The stolid German, the vibratile Italian! Yet fantasy wins, even if brewed in a homely Teutonic kettle ... These diabolical variations, the last word in the technical literature of the piano, are also vast spiritual problems. To play them requires fingers of steel, a heart of burning lava and the courage of a lion.”

== See also ==
- List of variations on a theme by another composer

== Bibliography ==
- Dubal, David (2004). The Art of the Piano: Its Performers, Literature, and Recordings (3rd ed.). Amadeus Press.
- Swafford, Jan (1999). Johannes Brahms: A Biography. New York: Vintage Books, Random House. ISBN 978-0679745822.
