= Variations on a Theme by Haydn =

1873 musical work by Johannes Brahms

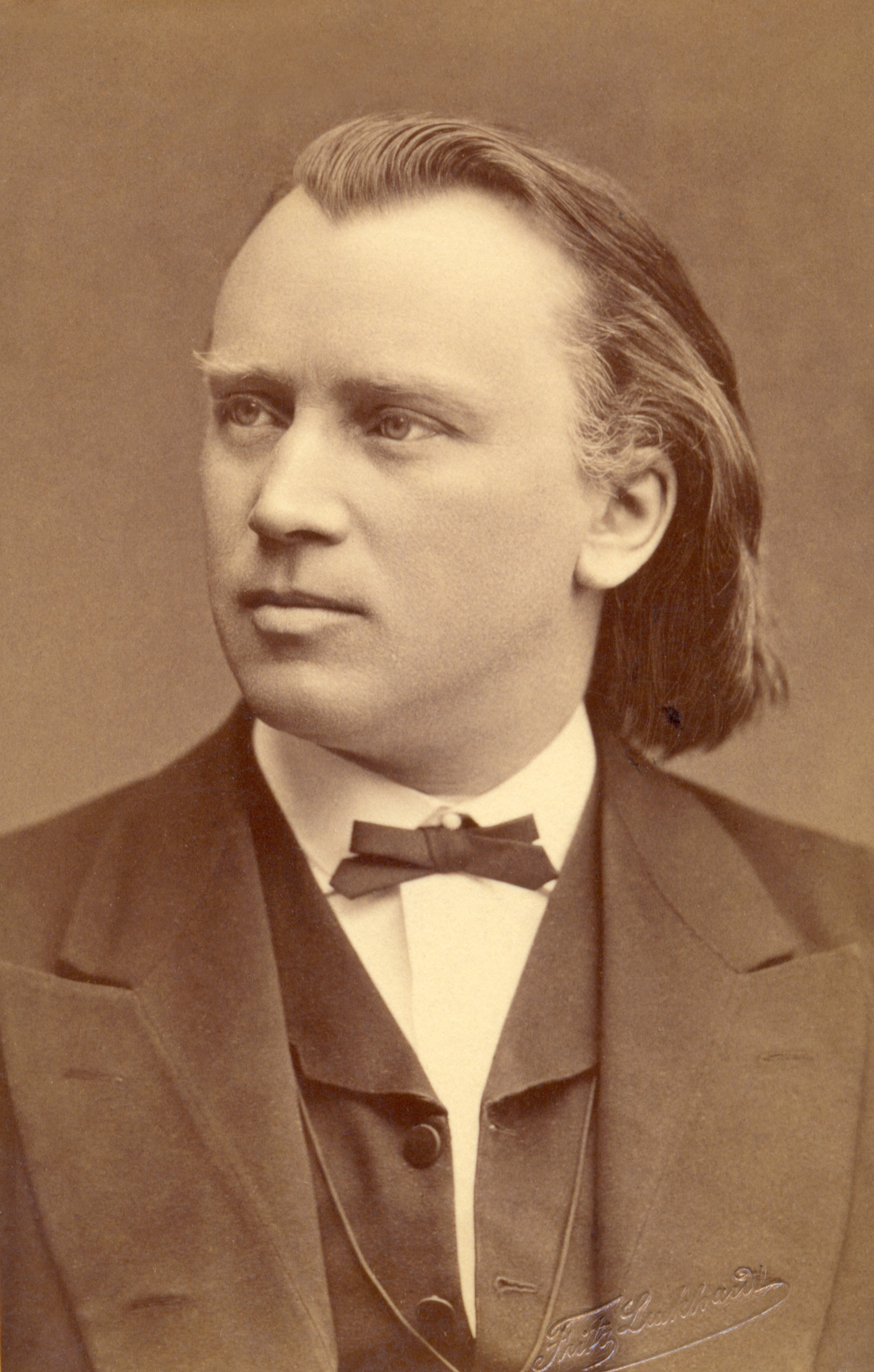
Johannes Brahms, c. 1876

The Variations on a Theme by Joseph Haydn (German: Variationen über ein Thema von Jos. Haydn), now also called the Saint Anthony Variations, is a work in the form of a theme and variations, composed by Johannes Brahms in the summer of 1873 at Tutzing in Bavaria. It consists of a theme in B♭ major based on a "Chorale St Antoni", eight variations, and a finale. The work was published in two versions: for two pianos, written first but designated Op. 56b; and for orchestra, designated Op. 56a. The orchestral version is better known and much more often heard than the two-piano version.

The first performance of the orchestral version was given on 2 November 1873 by the Vienna Philharmonic Orchestra under Brahms's baton.

It is often said to be the first independent set of variations for orchestra in the history of music, although there is at least one earlier piece in the same form, Antonio Salieri's Twenty-six Variations on 'La folia di Spagna' written in 1815.

== Origin of the theme ==
Brahms composed the work on a theme entitled "Chorale St. Antoni", which Brahms found in a wind ensemble composition. When Brahms discovered it, the wind ensemble piece carried an attribution to the composer Joseph Haydn. Brahms titled his own composition accordingly, crediting Haydn for the theme. However, music publishers in the early nineteenth century often attached the names of famous composers to works by unknown or lesser-known composers, to make the pieces more saleable. Subsequent research has concluded that the wind piece Brahms used as a source does not fit Haydn's style. The wind ensemble piece remains without clear attribution.

As a result, Brahms's piece is sometimes referred to today, in recordings and concert programs, as the St. Anthony Variations or Variations on the St. Anthony Chorale, in addition to the original title that Brahms gave it.

A detailed survey of the controversy can be found in Douglas Yeo's 2004 edition of the "Haydn" piece (ISMN M-57015-175-1). In 1870, Brahms's friend Carl Ferdinand Pohl, the librarian of the Vienna Philharmonic Society, who was working on a Haydn biography at the time, showed Brahms a transcription he had made of a piece attributed to Haydn titled "Divertimento No. 1". The second movement bore the heading "St. Anthony Chorale", and it is this movement which provides the theme on which the variations are based. Brahms's statement of the theme varies in small but significant ways from the original, principally with regard to instrumentation.

Some sources state the Divertimento was probably written by Ignaz Pleyel, but this has not been definitively established. A further question is whether the composer of the divertimento actually wrote the "St. Anthony Chorale" or simply quoted an older theme taken from an unknown source. To date, no other mention of a "St. Anthony Chorale" has been found.

== Instrumentation ==
The variations are scored for piccolo, 2 flutes, 2 oboes, 2 clarinets, 2 bassoons, contrabassoon, 4 horns (2 in E♭, 2 in B♭), 2 trumpets, timpani, triangle, and the normal string section of first and second violins, violas, cellos and double basses.

The piece usually takes about 18 minutes to perform.

== Form ==
Variations on a Theme by Joseph Haydn, theme and variations I, II and III

Variations on a Theme by Joseph Haydn, variation IV

Variations on a Theme by Joseph Haydn, variations V and VI

Variations on a Theme by Joseph Haydn, variation VII

Variations on a Theme by Joseph Haydn, variation VIII and finale
Version for two pianos. Performed by Neal and Nancy O'Doan.

The theme begins with a repeated ten-measure passage which itself consists of two five-measure phrases, a quirk that is likely to have caught Brahms's attention. Almost without exception, the eight variations follow the phrasal structure of the theme and, though less strictly, the harmonic structure as well. Each has a distinctive character, several calling to mind the forms and techniques of earlier eras, with some displaying an impressive mastery of counterpoint.

The finale is a passacaglia, with an ostinato of five measures in length, derived from the principal theme. Its culmination consists of a restatement of the chorale. Here, Brahms, usually restrained in his use of percussion in orchestral music, calls for a triangle.

Just before the end of the piece, in the coda of the finale, Brahms quotes a passage that really is by Haydn. In measures 463–464, the violas and cellos echo the cello line from measure 148 of the second movement of the latter's "Clock" Symphony, one of the finest examples of Haydn's pioneering work in the symphonic variation form. The reader may compare the two passages by following these links: Brahms, Haydn (see below for link credits). This fragmentary allusion may be the music's sole link to music known with certainty to be by Haydn.

== Sections ==
The sections are named and tempo markings given as follows. Where the tempo markings of the two versions differ, the one for Op. 56b is shown in parentheses.

- Theme. Chorale St. Antoni. Andante
- Variation I. Poco più animato (Andante con moto)
- Variation II. Più vivace (Vivace)
- Variation III. Con moto
- Variation IV. Andante con moto (Andante)
- Variation V. Vivace (Poco presto)
- Variation VI. Vivace
- Variation VII. Grazioso
- Variation VIII. Presto non troppo (Poco presto)
- Finale. Andante

== Use elsewhere ==
The main theme was used in the 23 minute title track from the 1974 LP Hamburger Concerto by Dutch rock group Focus.

== See also ==
- List of variations on a theme by another composer
