= Marga Richter =

American classical composer (1926–2020)

Florence Marga Richter (October 21, 1926 – June 25, 2020) was an American composer of classical music, and pianist.

== Biography ==
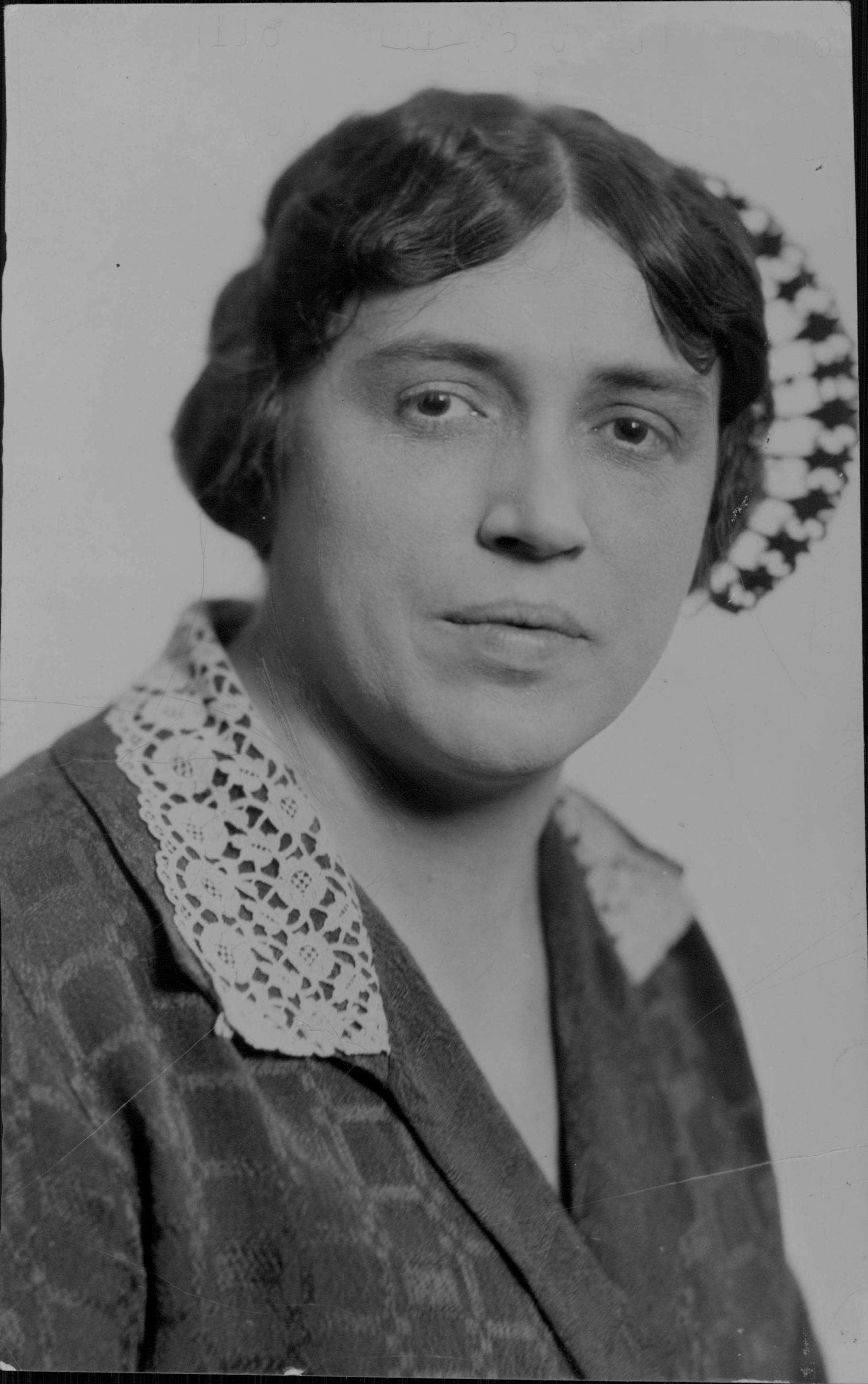
Inez Chandler Richter (1924)

Marga Richter was born in Reedsburg, Wisconsin, the daughter of the American soprano Inez Chandler (1885–1956) and a German army captain, Paul Richter. She studied piano at the MacPhail School of Music in Minneapolis with Irene Hellner and with Helena Morsztyn in New York City. She entered the Juilliard School of Music in 1945 and studied composition with William Bergsma and Vincent Persichetti and piano with Rosalyn Tureck, graduating with a BS and then MS degree in 1951. Richter was the first woman to graduate from Juilliard with a master's degree in composition. After completing her studies, she taught music appreciation at Nassau Community College from 1971 to 1972, and later began working as a composer full-time.

Richter composed several works for the Harkness Ballet in the early 1950s. Her music was also performed, recorded, and produced on numerous albums by MGM recordings at this time. During the 1970s, two of Richter's large-scale orchestral works Landscapes of the Mind I and Blackberry Vines and Winter Fruit received significant performances, and she received a publishing contract from Carl Fischer. During the 1980s, Richter composed vocal and choral music in addition to symphonic and chamber works. Richter's only opera Riders to the Sea was composed in the 1990s. Deeply connected to those in her personal world, Richter composed works to honor various individuals important to her, such as Lament for her mother, Threnody for her father, and numerous others.

Richter co-founded the Long Island Composers Alliance in 1972 with Herbert Deutsch and served as its co-director, president and vice-president. Richter has a son, pianist Michael Skelly and a daughter who is a nurse. A full-length biography of Richter was published in 2012 by the University of Illinois Press as part of their series on women composers. She died on June 25, 2020 at Barnegat, New Jersey.

== Compositional style and influence ==
Richter's musical style emphasizes chromaticism, a free use of dissonance, ostinatos, layering, rhythmic excitement, and dramatic pacing. She favored much use of seconds and sevenths. Her music often draws upon American, Irish, and Asian sources for inspiration. While she taught only a handful of students, she inspired many later women composers, including composer Dianne Goolkasian Rahbee. Richter is noted for excelling in her compositions for large-scale forces: orchestra, ballet, and ensembles. She composed one opera, Riders to the Sea.

== Honors and awards ==
- Annual awards from ASCAP since 1966
- Two grants from the National Endowment for the Arts (1977, 1979)
- Martha Baird Rockefeller Fund grant
- Meet the Composer grant
- National Federation of Music Clubs grant

== Selected works ==
Richter composed for orchestra, ballet, opera, chorus, orchestra, chamber ensemble and solo instrument and her compositions have been performed internationally. Selected works include:

- Abyss (1-act ballet, choreography by Stuart Hodes), orchestra, 1964
- Bird of Yearning (1-act ballet, choreography by Stuart Hodes), orchestra, 1967
- Riders to the Sea (1-act chamber opera, libretto by John Millington Synge) 1996
- Concerto for Piano and Violas, Cellos and Basses, 1955
- Lament, string orchestra, 1956
- Aria and Toccata, viola, string orchestra, 1957
- Variations on a Sarabande, 1959
- Eight Pieces for Orchestra, large orchestra, 1961 (version of piano work)
- Darkening of the Light for viola solo (1961)
- Suite for solo viola (1962)
- Bird of Yearning, small orchestra (28 players), 1967 (version of ballet)
- Concerto No. 2 Landscapes of the Mind I, piano, large orchestra, 1968–74
- Fragments, 1978
- Country Auction, symphonic band, 1976
- Blackberry Vines and Winter Fruit, 1976
- Spectral Chimes/Enshrouded Hills, 3 quintets, orchestra, 1978–80
- Düsseldorf Concerto, flute, harp, viola, small orchestra (timpani, percussion, strings), 1981–82
- Out of Shadows and Solitude, large orchestra, 1985
- Quantum Quirks of a Quick Quaint Quark, 1991
- Variations and interludes on themes from Monteverdi and Bach (concerto), violin, cello, piano, large orchestra, 1992
- Three Songs of Madness and Death (text by John Webster), mixed chorus, 1955;
- Psalm 91, mixed chorus, 1963
- Variations on a theme by Neidhart von Reuental, piano, 1974
- Quantum Quirks of a Quick Quaint Quark No. 2, piano, 1992
- Soundings, harpsichord or piano, 1965
- Short Prelude in Baroque Style, harpsichord or piano 1974

== Discography ==
Richter's works have been recorded and issued on CD including:

- William George, Andrea Lodge, Dew-drops on a Lotus Leaf & Other Songs, Redshift
- London Philharmonic Orchestra, Blackberry Vines and Winter Fruit, Leonarda
- Seattle Symphony, Out of Shadows and Solitude, MMC-Master Musicians Collective
- Czech Radio Symphony Orchestra, Spectral Chimes/Enshrouded Hills and Quantum Quirks of a Quick Quaint Quark, MMC
- Seattle Symphony, Out of Shadows and Solitude, MMC-Master Musicians Collective
- Journeys: Orchestral Works by American Women, Leonarda Productions, LE327, 1985. Features Richter's Lament for String Orchestra 1956, and also includes music of Nancy Van de Vate, Kay Gardner, Libby Larsen, Katherine Hoover, Ursula Mamlok, Jane Brockman. Performed by Bournemouth Sinfonietta, Arioso Chamber Orchestra, Carolann Martin conducting
