= Hans Bottermund =

German musician and composer

Hans Bottermund (1892 in Leipzig – 1949 in Berlin), was a cellist and composer who studied with Klengel, Becker, and Schroeder. He taught in Frankfurt and was the principal cellist of the Berlin Philharmonic. During World War II, he and his wife remained in Berlin; he transferred his Guarnerius cello to a bank in Copenhagen for safekeeping prior to his death in 1949. His papers are held by John Sharp, principal cellist of the Chicago Symphony Orchestra.

== Compositions ==
- Variations on Niccolò Paganini's 24th Caprice for Violin
