= Pavel Necheporenko =

Soviet musician

- Павел Нечепоренко
- Born: August 31, 1916; Chyhyryn, Ukrainian SSR, Soviet Union
- Died: March 27, 2009 (aged 92); Moscow, Russia
- Occupation: Balalaika player

Pavel Ivanovich Necheporenko (Note: Russian: Павел Иванович Нечепоренко, romanized: Pavel Ivanovich Necheporenko; Ukrainian: Павло Іванович Нечепоренко, romanized: Pavlo Ivanovych Necheporenko; sometimes given as Nechiporenko) (31 August [O.S. 18 August] 1916 – 27 March 2009) was a Soviet musician, highly recognized as a virtuoso performer of the balalaika.

== Biography ==
Necheporenko was born on 31 August [O.S. 18 August] 1916, the son of a mariner. Necheporenko first learned the balalaika from his father. By the time of the Second World War, Necheporenko was already a distinguished balalaikist. Serving in the Soviet navy, he spent the Siege of Leningrad moving from ship to ship giving morale-boosting solo concerts, earning himself a medal for bravery.

After the war, Necheporenko graduated as a conductor from the Moscow Conservatory in 1949. He became the chief conductor of the Andreyev Russian Folk Instruments Orchestra, a post he held till 1955. However, this post was eclipsed by the fact that he was a virtuoso balalaikist in his own right, and was giving solo performances. During the Soviet period he was the winner of an all-union contest of folk instrument performers. He was awarded the Stalin Prize in 1952, awarded Honored Artist of the USSR in 1959 and given the title of People's Artist of the USSR in 1969.

Of distinguished appearance with wavy grey hair, an inclination to be as formally dressed as possible when photographed with his instrument, and a transcriber of classical pieces for balalaika; Necheporenko, following in the footsteps of Vasily Vasilievich Andreyev, presents the balalaika as a musical instrument with the same status as any "serious" instrument used in classical music. Among his most famous transcriptions is his Variations on Paganini's 24th Caprice, which Necheporenko played on balalaika without accompaniment. He also wrote original arrangements for balalaika and piano: "Hour by Hour" and "From Village to Village" were pieces most sought out by other balalaika players.

Necheporenko worked as a professor at the Gnessin State Musical College for many years. He was considered to be the best teacher in the country by his contemporaries. Many of his students won competitions and found teaching positions at other institutions. Necheporenko would quite often spend a lot of time preparing lessons for his students. New students were usually required to forget everything they knew about balalaika playing and learn Necheporenko's method from scratch. Necheporenko utilized "tough love" to motivate his students to perform at a high level. In 2006, a concert in Moscow was given to celebrate his 90th birthday. Several of his former students performed at this concert and a few expressed to the audience their heartfelt gratitude for all that Necheporenko had given to them as students.

Necheporenko died on 27 March 2009.
