= Joseph Czerny =

Austrian Empire musician

Joseph Czerny (17 June 1785, Hořovice – 7 January 1842, Vienna) was a pianist, composer, music publisher, and piano teacher from the Austrian Empire. He was not related to Carl Czerny.

Among his compositions is Variation No. 5 from Part II of Diabelli's Vaterländischer Künstlerverein and about 60 other works consisting of fantasias, rondos, other variations, etc., which he published. Among his pupils were Leopoldine Blahetka (1809–1885) and Ludwig van Beethoven's nephew, Karl. His variations were not well received by the English magazine The Harmonicon: "His variations, seven in number, have nothing new in them; they pursue the same track that has been beaten for many years past, and have, under various names, nauseated the ear during a long quarter of a century at least." Fétis was also critical of him: "Joseph's talent on the piano was less than mediocre; his compositions are not of a much higher order."

Apparently, Joseph only started composing after Carl gave fame to the name "Czerny", and he understood that he could capitalize on this coincidence. It was doubted that Joseph had ever composed anything, and that he instead had his works done by young artists whom he paid to obtain permission to put his name on their productions. But this suspicion eventually proved untrue, for the piano pieces bearing Joseph Czerny's name were already forgotten by about 1867. In the last years of his life, he had adopted the profession of bookseller-publisher.
