= Vaterländischer Künstlerverein =

Musical collaboration

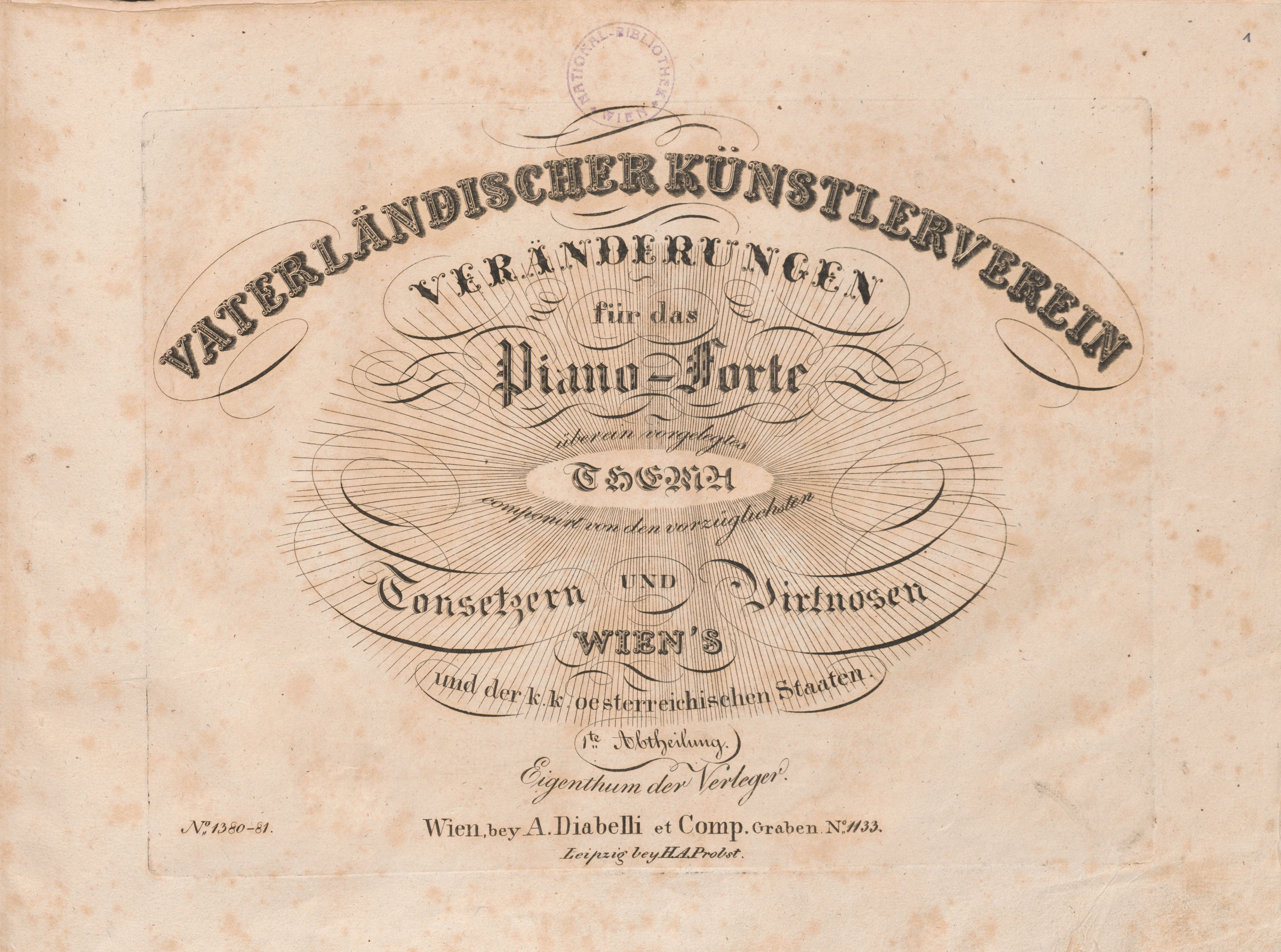
Front page of 1824 edition

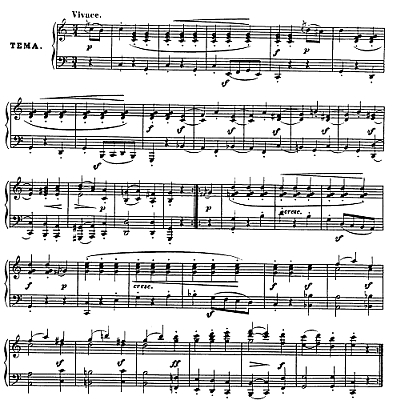
Theme of the Variations – Diabelli's waltz

Diabelli's theme
Performed by Neal O'Doan

Vaterländischer Künstlerverein was a collaborative musical publication or anthology, incorporating 83 variations for piano on a theme by Anton Diabelli, written by 51 composers living in or associated with Austria. It was published in two parts in 1823 and 1824, by firms headed by Diabelli. It includes Ludwig van Beethoven's Diabelli Variations, Op. 120 (a set of 33 variations), as well as single variations from 50 other composers including Carl Czerny, Franz Schubert, Johann Nepomuk Hummel, Ignaz Moscheles, Friedrich Kalkbrenner, Franz Liszt (aged only 12 at the time of publication), and a host of lesser-known names including Franz Xaver Wolfgang Mozart and others now largely forgotten.

The term Vaterländischer Künstlerverein has various translations, including "Patriotic Artists' Association", "Art Association of the Fatherland", "Patriotic Culture Club", "Fatherland's Society of Artists", "National Artists' Association", "Native Artist's Association" and "Native Society of Artists".

== Background ==
In 1819, the Viennese publishing house of Cappi & Diabelli invited a number of Austrian composers to contribute one variation each for the piano, on a theme written by Anton Diabelli himself, one of the principals of the firm. Diabelli's theme is usually described as a waltz, but in form it has more of the character of a Ländler. Carl Czerny was asked to also provide a coda as a suitable way of rounding out the collection. Ludwig van Beethoven exceeded his brief by writing no less than 33 variations, and entered into negotiations with Diabelli to have his set published separately from the others. Beethoven's first biographer, Anton Schindler, wrote that the project was first devised in the winter of 1822–23, but this is an error, as Czerny's manuscript is dated 7 May 1819 and Franz Schubert's variation is known to have been written in March 1821. Czerny's was the earliest variation to be written and, as he also wrote the coda, it is likely that Diabelli involved him in the project from the very beginning. It is also likely that the invitations were sent not long before Czerny's contributions were written (May 1819), but certainly no later.

It is not known exactly what lay behind this project, other than perhaps a simple act of self-promotion, either for the firm or for Diabelli himself. The combined contributions were published as Vaterländischer Künstlerverein, in two parts. Part I was published by Cappi & Diabelli in June 1823, and consisted of Beethoven's 33 variations (now known as the Diabelli Variations, Op. 120), with a dedication to Antonie Brentano. By the time the second part was published, the two principals, Diabelli and Pietro Cappi had parted company, and Diabelli had joined with Anton Spina and renamed the firm Diabelli & Co. Part II was published in late 1823 or early 1824 by Diabelli & Co., and includes the other 50 variations and Czerny's coda.

It is also not known how many composers were approached, but 51 responded to the invitation. Some well-known names such as Ignaz von Seyfried and Joseph Weigl do not appear. Whether they were not interested in participating or whether they were not even approached is not known.

Apart from Beethoven's 33 variations, 48 of the other 50 composers wrote only the one variation they were asked for. Franz Xaver Wolfgang Mozart and Gottfried Rieger wrote two variations each, but only one from each of them was originally published.

== Part I, by Beethoven ==
Ludwig van Beethoven's Diabelli Variations, his last major piano work, is part of the keyboard music canon and is by far the better known volume. It is frequently performed and recorded to this day.

== Part II, by various composers ==
The composers of Part II include some names still notable today, but most of them have been forgotten. The variations were numbered in strictly alphabetical order according to the then current spelling conventions. The full list follows:

No.	Composer	Vital dates	Meter	Key signature	Tempo marking	No. of measures (including repeats)	Subtitle (if any)	Comments
Theme	Anton Diabelli	1781–1858	3/4	C major	Vivace	64		
1	Ignaz Aßmayer	1790–1862	3/4	C major	Moderato	64		
2	Carl Maria von Bocklet	1801–1881	2/4	C major	Vivace	64		Born in Prague, received recommendations from Beethoven, intimate friend of Schubert and dedicatee of Schubert's D major sonata, D. 850.
3	Leopold Eustachius Czapek	1792–1840	3/8	C major	Vivace molto legato	64		A Bohemian, friend of Chopin
4	Carl Czerny	1791–1857	3/4	C major	—	64		
5	Joseph Czerny	1785–1842	3/4	C major	—	64		No relation to Carl Czerny
6	Moritz Joseph Johann, Prince of Dietrichstein	1775–1864	3/4	C major	Tempo vivo del Thema	64		
7	Joseph Drechsler	1782–1852	3/4	C major	Adagio – Allegro	167	Quasi overture	
8	Emanuel Aloys Förster	1748–1823	3/4	C major	Allegro	294	Capriccio	He died in November 1823; his posthumously published variation was his last composition. By far, this variation is the longest from the set.
9	Franz Jakob Freystädtler	1761–1841	9/8	C major	—	64		A pupil of Wolfgang Amadeus Mozart.
10	Johann Baptist Gänsbacher	1778–1844	3/4	C major	—	64		Friend of Carl Maria von Weber and Giacomo Meyerbeer.
11	Joseph Gelinek ("Abbé Gelinek")	1758–1825	3/4	C major	Presto	128		
12	Anton Halm	1789–1872	3/4	C major	Dolce	64		
13	Joachim Hoffmann	1788–1856	3/4	C major	Vivo	80	Fugato	
14	Johann Horzalka	1798–1860	3/4	A♭ major	Adagio	34		
15	Joseph Huglmann	1768–1839	3/4	A♭ major	Allegro	64		
16	Johann Nepomuk Hummel	1778–1837	3/4	C major	—	64		
17	Anselm Hüttenbrenner	1794–1868	3/4	C major	Allegro	63		He was on friendly terms with Beethoven and Schubert and kept the manuscript of Schubert's Unfinished Symphony for many years.
18	Friedrich Kalkbrenner	1785–1849	3/4	C major	Allegro non troppo	64		A German by birth, he lived in London and Paris.
19	Friedrich August Kanne	1778–1833	3/4	C major	—	64		
20	Joseph Kerzkowsky	1791–1875	3/4	F major	Moderato con espressione	64		He cannot be identified with certainty; he was formerly believed to be the Polish violinist Joachim Kaczkowski.
21	Conradin Kreutzer	1780–1849	3/4	C major	Vivace	64		
22	Eduard Baron von Lannoy	1787–1853	3/4	C major	—	64		
23	Maximilian Joseph Leidesdorf	1787–1840	3/4	C major	Vivace	64		Like Diabelli, also a publisher.
24	Franz Liszt	1811–1886	2/4	C minor	Allegro	64		See Variation on a Waltz by Diabelli, S. 147. Liszt was aged only 7 at the time Diabelli sent out his invitations, and was still only 12 by the time Vaterländischer Künstlerverein was published. It is very likely that, being so young, he was not on Diabelli's invitation list, but that Carl Czerny, his teacher, arranged for his inclusion.
25	Joseph Mayseder	1789–1863	3/4	C major	Allegro	64		Violinist, member of the Schuppanzigh String Quartet.
26	Ignaz Moscheles	1794–1870	3/4	C major	—	64		
27	Ignaz von Mosel	1772–1844	3/4	C major	—	64		Custodian of the Imperial Library.
28	"Wolfgang Amadeus Mozart fils" (Franz Xaver Wolfgang Mozart)	1791–1844	3/4	C major	Con fuoco	64		He was a son of Wolfgang Amadeus Mozart. He wrote two variations, only one being published; his second appears in later editions as Variation 28a.
29	Joseph Panny	1796–1838	6/8	A minor	Allegro con brio	68		
30	Hieronymus Payer	1787–1845	3/4	C major	—	64		
31	Johann Peter Pixis	1788–1874	3/4	C major	—	64		
32	Wenzel Plachy (or Václav Plachý)	1785–1858	3/4	C major	Con fuoco	64		Bohemian organist
33	Gottfried Rieger	1764–1855	3/4	C major	Allegro ma no troppo	64		Musical director at Brno. He wrote two variations, the second of which was rejected but was printed in later editions as Variation 33a.
34	Philipp Jakob Riotte	1776–1856	3/4	F minor – F major	Allegro	92		
35	Franz de Paula Roser	1779–1830	6/8	A-flat major	—	32		A theatre conductor
36	Johann Baptist Schenk	1753–1836	3/4	C major	Moderato	120	Caprice	
37	Franz Schoberlechner	1797–1843	3/4	C major	—	64		
38	Franz Schubert	1797–1828	3/4	C minor	—	64		His variation is listed as D. 718 in the Deutsch catalogue of Schubert's works.
39	Simon Sechter	1788–1867	3/4	C major	—	64	Incitatio (or Imitatio) quasi Canon a 3 voci	
40	"S.R.D." (Archduke Rudolf of Austria)	1788–1831	3/4	C major	Allegro	136	Fuga	"S.R.D." stands for Serenissimus Rudolfus Dux, one of Rudolf’s titles. He was an amateur composer who was a student of Beethoven's and dedicatee of his Archduke Trio, Hammerklavier Sonata and Emperor Concerto
41	Maximilian Stadler	1748–1833	3/4	C major	—	64		Austrian composer, musicologist, and pianist: friend of Haydn, Mozart, Beethoven, and Schubert and completer of many of Mozart's unfinished works.
42	Joseph von Szalay	1800–1860	3/4	C major	—	64		A student of Förster, Hummel and Antonio Salieri, and appeared as a pianist at age 9.
43	"Wenzel Johann Tomaschek" (Václav Tomášek)	1774–1850	3/4	C major	Tempo giusto	64	Polonaise	
44	Michael Umlauf	1781–1842	3/4	C major	Presto	64		
45	"Friedrich Dionysius Weber" (Bedřich Diviš Weber)	1766–1842	3/4	C major	Con fuoco	64		
46	Franz Weber	1805–1876	3/4	C major	Brillante	64		
47	Karl Angelus Winkhler	1787–1845	4/4	C major	Allegro con fuoco	64		An amateur composer from Pest
48	Franz Weiss	1778–1830	3/4	C major	—	64		Violist, member of the Schuppanzigh String Quartet.
49	"Johann Nepomuk August Wittasek" (Jan August Vitásek)	1770–1839	3/4	C major	Un poco moderato	64		
50	"Johann Hugo Worzischek" (Jan Václav Voříšek)	1791–1825	3/4	C major	—	64		
Coda	Carl Czerny	1791–1857	3/4	Moves through various keys, ending in C major	Vivace	199		

Note: Some of the composers gave no tempo indication, and they can be assumed to be played Vivace, as in the original theme.

== Recordings and performances ==
Beethoven's Diabelli Variations have been recorded and performed many times.

The remainder of Vaterländischer Künstlerverein has received very little attention since its publication. The complete set has been recorded by Rudolf Buchbinder. Martha Argerich has performed excerpts in concert.
