= Philipp Jakob Riotte =

German composer (1776–1856)

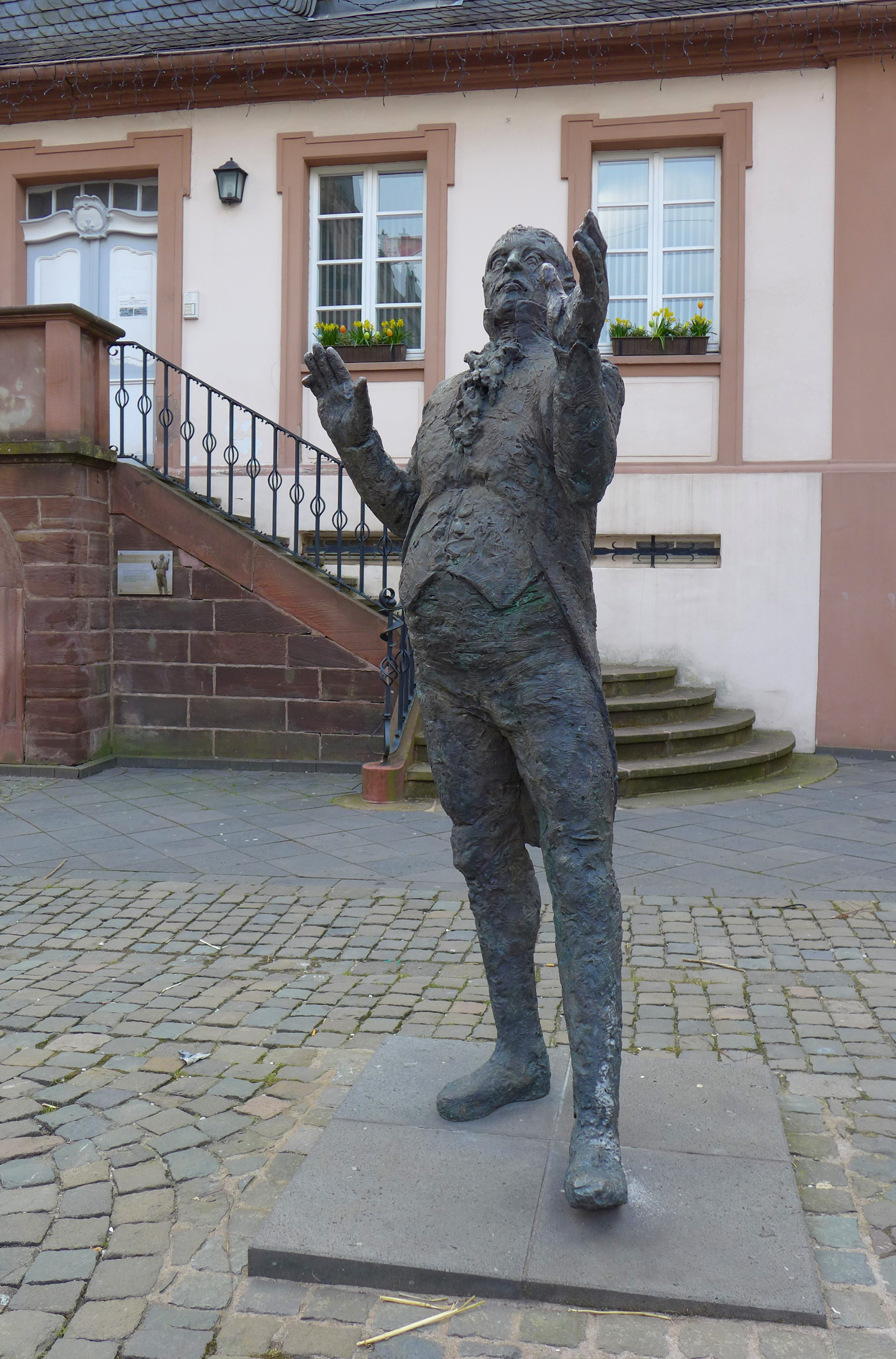
Monument of Philipp Jakob Riotte

Philipp Jakob Riotte (16 August 1776 – 1856) was a German composer who lived primarily in Vienna. In the 1820s, his works were among the most-performed at the Theater an der Wien. He was a contemporary of Ludwig van Beethoven. Very few of his works remain in the active repertoire today.

== Life ==
Philipp Jakob Riotte was born at St. Wendel (Saarland). He was probably descended from a French emigrant Huguenot family.

The earliest records indicate he was expelled as choirboy in his hometown of Sankt Wendel. He studied violin, violoncello and later piano and organ. In 1793, he received his first employment as an organist at a seminar in Trier. In 1794 to 1805, he resided in Blieskastel, the residence of the Imperial counts of Leyen, as well as in Frankfurt am Main and Offenbach. In Offenbach, he continued his studies with the composer and music publisher Johann Anton André. From 1806 to 1808, Riotte was active as a Kapellmeister in Gdańsk and as a chief conductor in Magdeburg.

In 1808, Riotte established himself in Vienna. At first he made a living by giving piano lessons and selling his own compositions. In addition, he was active as a musical correspondent. Between 1810 and 1815, he contributed four "characteristic sound paintings" (Charakteristische Tongemälde), which helped establish his reputation. One of these "paintings" was the "battle of Leipzig or the liberation of Germany," a work that found some success across Germany. In addition, he wrote operas and oratorios, and piano reductions and variations of successful operas for the domestic parlour market.

In 1818, Riotte became assistant Kapellmeister to the famous Theater an der Wien, shortly after its acquisition by a group of Viennese court nobles, including Ferdinand Palffy von Erdöd. The new owners decided to change the repertoire of the opera house, and Riotte wrote the music for the some of theatre's new spectacles, including children's ballets. In 1828, Riotte left the Theater an der Wien, shortly after its compelled sale in 1826. Through the 1830s, he composed extensively for the Theater in der Leopoldstadt. With more than 300 performances of his works, Riotte's exposure surpassed that of Ignaz von Seyfried and Mozart, although he remained well-behind the leading operatic composer of the day, Gioacchino Rossini.

Riotte died in Vienna in 1856 leaving no descendants. On account of his attachment with Sankt Wendel, he supported the town and left his estate to endow a local charitable institution.

== Compositions ==
Around 1823, he composed a variation on a waltz by Anton Diabelli, being one of the 50 composers who contributed to Vaterländischer Künstlerverein, an anthology that also included Ludwig van Beethoven's Diabelli Variations.

His compositions also include a symphony (No. 1 in C, Op. 25), a clarinet concerto (Op. 28 in B♭), and a flute concerto (Op. 4 in G).

There is also a piano concerto in E♭, Op. 8, and three string quartets, Op. 21.
