= Variation on a Waltz by Diabelli (Liszt) =

Composition for piano by Franz Liszt

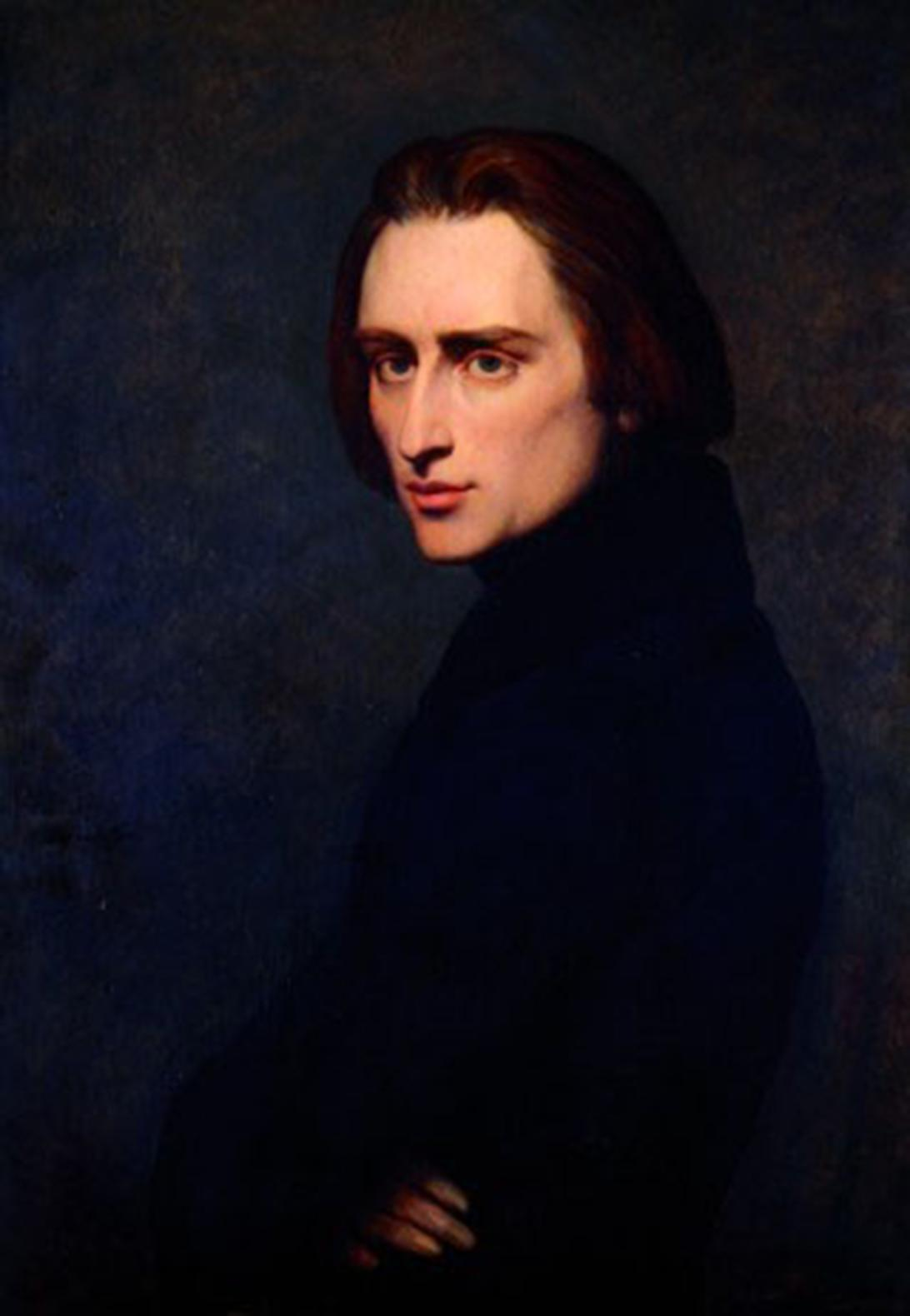
Portrait of Franz Liszt, 1837

Variation on a Waltz by Diabelli (French: Variation sur une valse de Diabelli), S.147, is a variation by Franz Liszt composed in 1822 and published in late 1823 or early 1824 as Variation No. 24 of Part II of Vaterländischer Künstlerverein, a collection of variations by 50 composers. All the variations were based on a waltz composed by Anton Diabelli, who also published the work. It was this same invitation from Diabelli to write a variation that inspired Ludwig van Beethoven to write his 33 Diabelli Variations, Op. 120, which formed the entirety of Part I of Vaterländischer Künstlerverein.

== Genesis ==
This is Franz Liszt's first known and published work. He might have composed it at the instigation of Carl Czerny, his piano teacher, who also composed a variation and a coda for the set. Liszt was virtually unknown at the time of publishing and he was listed as "Franz Liszt (Knabe von 11 Jahren) geboren in Ungarn" (11-year-old boy, born in Hungary). At the time Diabelli issued his invitations to write the variations (May 1819), Liszt was aged only seven, but by the time of publication, he had turned 12. He was the only child composer to write a variation for the set.

== Form ==
The variation is written in C minor, in 2/4 time, in the form of an étude. It keeps to the original theme, "in a flowing style of chord passages in an abundance of notes but without any lofty sentiment" in the words of Liszt's biographer Lina Ramann.

Liszt was one of the few of the 50 composers who varied either the time signature or the key signature from Diabelli's original. He changed Diabelli's C major to C minor, and changed 3/4 time to 2/4.

== See also ==
- Vaterländischer Künstlerverein
- Diabelli Variations
- List of variations on a theme by another composer
