= Panny =

Panny may refer to:

- Panavision, an American motion picture equipment company specializing in cameras and lenses
- Panasonic Corporation, a Japanese electronics manufacturer
- Joseph Panny (1796–1838), Austrian composer and violinist
- Panny Nikas (born 1988), Australian footballer
- The Church of Our Lady Victorious (Kostel Panny Marie Vítězné), a Carmelite church in Prague
