= Ignaz Assmayer =

Austrian composer of liturgical music

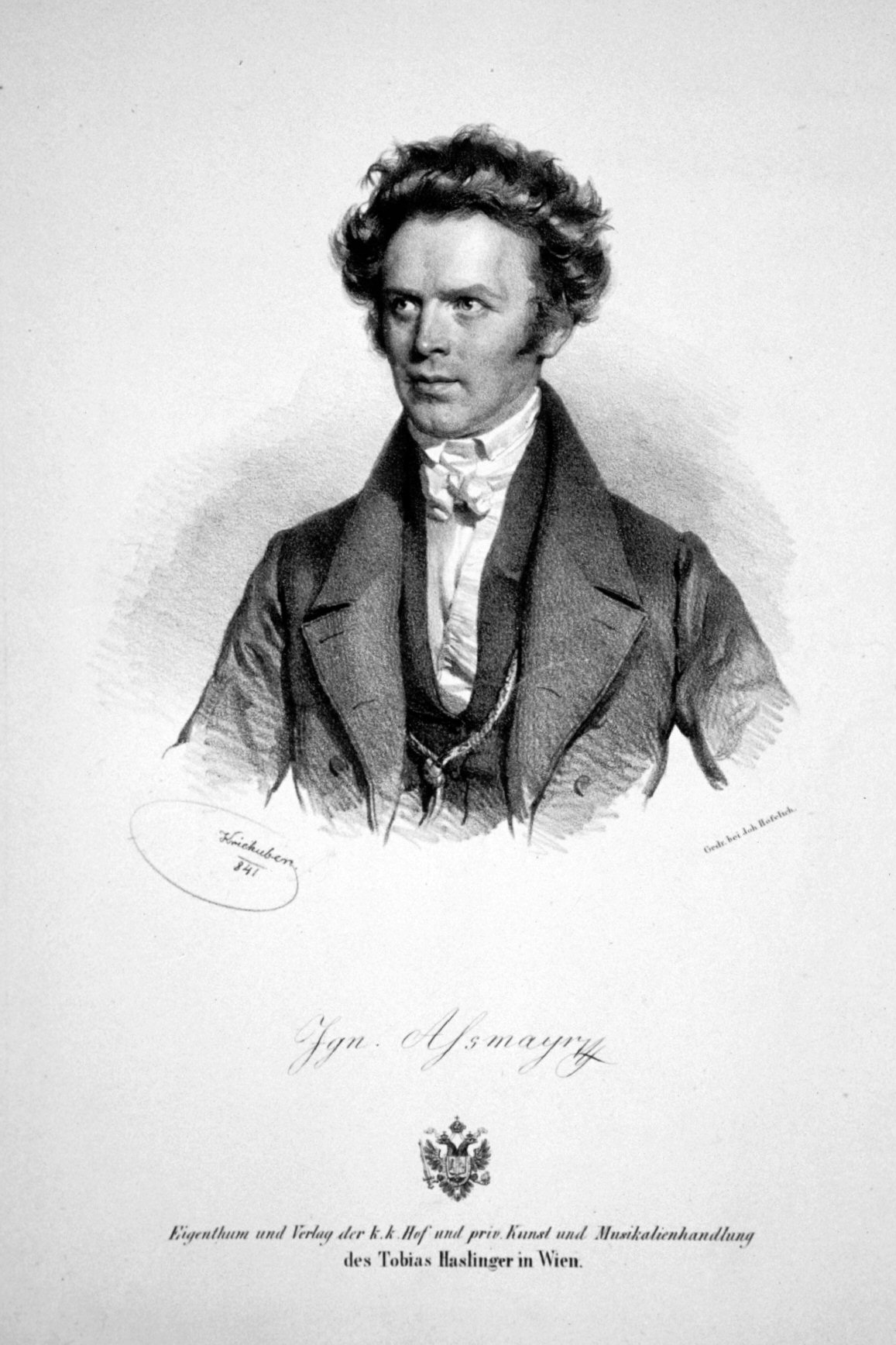

Ignaz Assmayer (11 February 1790 – 31 August 1862) was an Austrian composer of liturgical music. An organist at St. Peter's Abbey in Salzburg, he lived in Vienna from 1815, and was in 1846 the conductor of the Court Orchestra. Assmayer was a friend of Franz Schubert.

== Life ==
Assmayer was born at Salzburg. He studied under Andreas Brunmayr and Michael Haydn, and later, when he went to Vienna, he received further instruction from Joseph Leopold Eybler. In 1808 he was organist at St. Peter's in Salzburg, and here he wrote his oratorio "Die Sündfluth" (The Deluge) and his cantata "Worte der Weihe".

Some time after his move to Vienna, in 1815, he became choirmaster at the Schotten Kirche, and in 1825 was appointed imperial organist. After having served eight years as vice-choirmaster, he received in 1846 the appointment of second choir-master to the Court, as successor to Joseph Weigl. He died in Vienna.

== Works ==
His principal oratorios, "Das Gelübde", "Saul und David", and "Sauls Tod", were repeatedly performed by the Tonkünstler-Societät, of which he was conductor for fifteen years. He also wrote fifteen masses, two requiems, a Te Deum, and various smaller church pieces. Of these, two oratorios, one mass, the requiems, and the Te Deum, and furthermore sixty secular compositions, comprising symphonies, overtures, pastorales, etc., were published.

In the 1820s, he was one of 50 composers to write a Variation on a theme of Anton Diabelli for Part II of the Vaterländischer Künstlerverein. Part I was devoted to the 33 variations supplied by Beethoven, which have gained an independent identity as his Diabelli Variations, Op. 120.

As to his style, Grove calls it correct and fluent, but wanting in both invention and force.
