= Leopold Eustachius Czapek =

Austrian pianist and composer

Leopold Eustachius Czapek (15 November 1792, Český Krumlov, Bohemia – 1840, Iliria) was an Austrian pianist and composer. He was friends with Frédéric Chopin and corresponded regularly with him. Among his own compositions is a variation on a theme, a waltz by Anton Diabelli, for the Vaterländischer Künstlerverein.

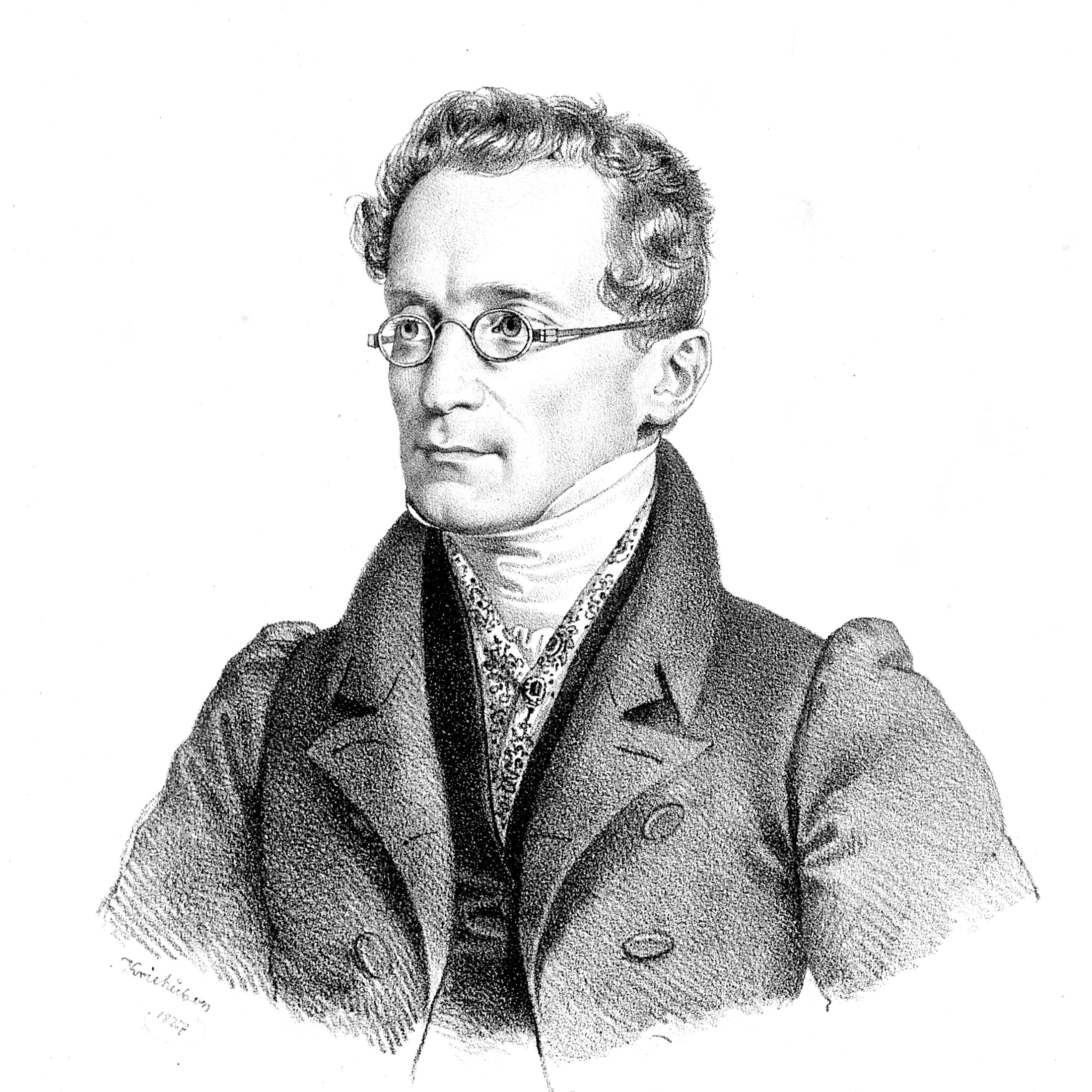
The portrait of Leopold Eustache Czapek by Kriehuber
