= Diabelli Variations =

Piano composition by Ludwig van Beethoven

- Piano music by Ludwig van Beethoven
- Theme of the Variations
- Key: C major
- Opus: 120
- Year: 1819 to 1823
- Form: variations
- Based on: Waltz by Anton Diabelli
- Published: June 1823: Vienna Cappi & Diabelli
- Movements: 34

The 33 Variations on a waltz by Anton Diabelli, Op. 120, commonly known as the Diabelli Variations, is a set of variations for the piano written between 1819 and 1823 by Ludwig van Beethoven on a waltz composed by Anton Diabelli. It forms the first part of Diabelli's publication Vaterländischer Künstlerverein, the second part consisting of 50 variations by 50 other composers. It is often considered to be the greatest set of variations for keyboard along with Bach's Goldberg Variations.

The music writer Donald Tovey called it "the greatest set of variations ever written" and pianist Alfred Brendel has described it as "the greatest of all piano works". It also comprises, in the words of Hans von Bülow, "a microcosm of Beethoven's art". In Beethoven: The Last Decade 1817–1827, Martin Cooper writes, "The variety of treatment is almost without parallel, so that the work represents a book of advanced studies in Beethoven's manner of expression and his use of the keyboard, as well as a monumental work in its own right". In his Structural Functions of Harmony, Arnold Schoenberg writes that the Diabelli Variations "in respect of its harmony, deserves to be called the most adventurous work by Beethoven".

Beethoven's approach to the theme is to take some of its smallest elements – the opening turn, the descending fourth and fifth, the repeated notes – and build upon them pieces of great imagination, power and subtlety. Alfred Brendel wrote, "The theme has ceased to reign over its unruly offspring. Rather, the variations decide what the theme may have to offer them. Instead of being confirmed, adorned and glorified, it is improved, parodied, ridiculed, disclaimed, transfigured, mourned, stamped out and finally uplifted".

Beethoven does not seek variety by using key-changes, staying with Diabelli's C major for most of the set: among the first twenty-eight variations, he uses the tonic minor only once, in Variation 9. Then, nearing the conclusion, Beethoven uses C minor for Variations 29–31 and for Variation 32, a triple fugue, he switches to E♭ major. Coming at this late point, after such a long period in C major, the key-change has an increased dramatic effect. At the end of the fugue, a culminating flourish consisting of a diminished seventh arpeggio is followed by a series of quiet chords punctuated by silences. These chords lead back to Diabelli's C major for Variation 33, a closing minuet.

== Background ==
In early 1819 Diabelli, a well-known music publisher and composer, sent a waltz of his creation to all the important composers of the Austrian Empire, including Franz Schubert, Carl Czerny, Johann Nepomuk Hummel, and the Archduke Rudolph, asking each of them to write a variation on it. His plan was to publish all the variations in a patriotic volume called Vaterländischer Künstlerverein, and to use the profits to benefit orphans and widows of the Napoleonic Wars. Franz Liszt was not included, but it seems his teacher Czerny arranged for him to also provide a variation, which he composed at the age of 11.

Beethoven had had a connection with Diabelli for a number of years. About a slightly earlier period, 1815, Beethoven's authoritative biographer, Alexander Wheelock Thayer, writes, "Diabelli, born near Salzburg in 1781, had now been for some years one of the more prolific composers of light and pleasing music, and one of the best and most popular teachers in Vienna. He was much employed by Steiner and Co., as copyist and corrector, and in this capacity enjoyed much of Beethoven's confidence, who also heartily liked him as a man." At the time of his project for variations on a theme of his own by various composers, Diabelli had advanced to become a partner in the publishing firm of Cappi and Diabelli.

The oft-told but now questionable story of the origins of this work is that Beethoven at first refused categorically to participate in Diabelli's project, dismissing the theme as banal, a Schusterfleck or 'cobbler's patch,'^{[a]} unworthy of his time. Not long afterwards, according to the story, upon learning that Diabelli would pay a handsome price for a full set of variations from him, Beethoven changed his mind and decided to show how much could be done with such slim materials. (In another version of the legend, Beethoven was so insulted at being asked to work with material he considered beneath him that he wrote 33 variations to demonstrate his prowess.) Today, however, this story is taken as more legend than fact. Its origins are with Anton Schindler, Beethoven's unreliable biographer, whose account conflicts in a number of ways with several established facts, indicating that he did not have first-hand knowledge of events.

At some point, Beethoven certainly did accept Diabelli's proposal, but rather than contributing a single variation on the theme, he planned a large set of variations. To begin work he laid aside his sketching of the Missa solemnis, completing sketches for four variations by early 1819. (Schindler was so far off the mark that he claimed, "At the most, he worked three months on it, during the summer of 1823". Carl Czerny, a pupil of Beethoven, claimed that "Beethoven wrote these Variations in a merry freak".) By the summer of 1819, he had completed twenty-three of the set of thirty-three. In February 1820, in a letter to the publisher Simrock, he mentioned "grand variations", as yet incomplete. Then he laid the work aside for several years – something Beethoven rarely did – while he returned to the Missa solemnis and the late piano sonatas.

In June 1822, Beethoven offered to his publisher Peters "Variations on a waltz for pianoforte alone (there are many)". In the autumn of the same year he was in negotiations with Diabelli, writing to him, "The fee for the Variat. should be 40 ducats at the most if they are worked out on as large a scale as planned, but if this should not take place, it would be set for less". It was probably in February 1823 that Beethoven returned to the task of completing the set. By March or April 1823, the full set of thirty-three variations was finished. By April 30 a copy was ready to send to Ries in London. Beethoven kept the original set of twenty-three in order, but inserted nos. 1 (the opening march), 2, 15, 23 (sometimes called a parody of a Cramer finger exercise), 24 (a lyrical fughetta), 25, 26, 28, 29 (the first of the series of three slow variations leading to the final fugue and minuet), 31 (the third, highly expressive slow variation leading directly into the final fugue and minuet) and 33 (the concluding minuet).

One suggestion on what prompted Beethoven to write a set of "grand variations" on Diabelli's theme is the influence of the Archduke Rudolph who, in the previous year, under Beethoven's tutelage, had composed a huge set of forty variations on a theme by Beethoven. In a letter of 1819 to the Archduke, Beethoven mentions that "in my writing-desk there are several compositions that bear witness to my remembering Your Imperial Highness".

Several theories have been advanced on why he decided to write thirty-three variations. He might have been trying to outdo himself after his 32 Variations in C minor, or trying to outdo Bach's Goldberg Variations with its total of thirty-two pieces (two presentations of the theme and thirty variations). There is a story that Diabelli was pressing Beethoven to send him his contribution to the project, whereupon Beethoven asked, "How many contributions have you got?" "Thirty-two", said Diabelli. "Go ahead and publish them", Beethoven is purported to have replied, "I shall write thirty-three all by myself." Alfred Brendel observes, "In Beethoven's own pianistic output, the figures 32 and 33 have their special significance: 32 sonatas are followed by 33 variations as a crowning achievement, of which Var. 33 relates directly to the thirty-second's final adagio." And Brendel adds, whimsically, "There happens to be, between the 32 Variations in C minor and the sets Opp. 34 and 35, a numerical gap. The Diabelli Variations fills it."

Diabelli published the work quickly as Op. 120 in June of the same year, adding the following introductory note:

We present here to the world Variations of no ordinary type, but a great and important masterpiece worthy to be ranked with the imperishable creations of the old Classics—such a work as only Beethoven, the greatest living representative of true art—only Beethoven, and no other, can produce. The most original structures and ideas, the boldest musical idioms and harmonies are here exhausted; every pianoforte effect based on a solid technique is employed, and this work is the more interesting from the fact that it is elicited from a theme which no one would otherwise have supposed capable of a working-out of that character in which our exalted Master stands alone among his contemporaries. The splendid Fugues, Nos. 24 and 32, will astonish all friends and connoisseurs of serious style, as will Nos. 2, 6, 16, 17, 23, &c. the brilliant pianists; indeed all these variations, through the novelty of their ideas, care in working-out, and beauty in the most artful of their transitions, will entitle the work to a place beside Sebastian Bach's famous masterpiece in the same form. We are proud to have given occasion for this composition, and have, moreover, taken all possible pains with regard to the printing to combine elegance with the utmost accuracy.

In the following year, 1824, it was republished as Volume 1 of the two-volume set Vaterländischer Künstlerverein, the second volume comprising the 50 variations by 50 other composers.^{[b]} Subsequent editions no longer mentioned Vaterländischer Künstlerverein.

== Title ==
The title Beethoven gave to the work has received some comment. His first reference was in his correspondence, where he called it Große Veränderungen über einen bekannten Deutschen Tanz ("Grand Variations on a well-known German dance"). Upon first publication, however, the title referred explicitly to a waltz by Diabelli: 33 Veränderungen über einen Walzer von Diabelli.

Beethoven chose the German word Veränderungen rather than the usual Italian-derived Variationen, in a period when he preferred using the German language in expression marks and titles, such as Hammerklavier. Yet, apart from the title, we find only traditional Italian musical terms within the work, suggesting that Beethoven was probably trying to make a point in his use of Veränderungen. Since Veränderungen can mean not only "variations" but also "transformations", it is sometimes suggested that Beethoven was announcing that this work does something more profound than had hitherto been done in variation form.

== Dedication ==
Although some commentators find significance in the work's dedication to Mme. Antonie von Brentano, offering it as evidence that she was Beethoven's "Immortal Beloved", she was not Beethoven's first choice. His original plan was to have the work sent to England where his old friend, Ferdinand Ries, would find a publisher. Beethoven promised the dedication to Ries's wife ("You will also receive in a few weeks 33 variations on a theme dedicated to your wife". Letter, April 25, 1823). A delay in the shipment to England caused confusion. Beethoven explained to Ries in a later letter, "The variations were not to appear here until after they had been published in London, but everything went askew. The dedication to Brentano was intended only for Germany, as I was under obligation to her and could publish nothing else at the time. Besides, only Diabelli, the publisher here, got them from me. Everything was done by Schindler, a bigger wretch I never knew on God's earth—an arch-scoundrel whom I have sent about his business—I can dedicate another work to your wife in place of it ..."

== Diabelli's theme ==
Whether Schindler's story is true or not that Beethoven at first contemptuously dismissed Diabelli's waltz as a Schusterfleck (rosalia / "cobbler's patch"), there is no doubt the definition fits the work perfectly – "musical sequences repeated one after another, each time modulated at like intervals" – as can be seen clearly in these three examples:

1.
2.

From the earliest days writers have commented on the juxtaposition between the waltz's simplicity and the vast, complex musical structure Beethoven built upon it, and the widest possible range of opinions of Diabelli's theme have been expressed. At one end of the spectrum is the admiration of Donald Tovey ("healthy, unaffected, and drily energetic", "rich in solid musical facts", cast in "reinforced concrete") and Maynard Solomon ("pellucid, brave, utterly lacking in sentimentality or affectation") and the kindly tolerance of Hans von Bülow ("quite a pretty and tasteful little piece, protected from the dangers of obsolescence by what one might call its melodic neutrality"). At the other end is William Kinderman's contempt ("banal", "trite", "a beer hall waltz").

In liner notes to Vladimir Ashkenazy's 2006 Decca recording, Michael Steinberg attempts to pinpoint what Beethoven might have found appealing in the theme, writing:

Diabelli's theme is a thirty-two bar waltz laid out in symmetrical four-bar phrases and is almost tuneless, as though both hands were playing accompaniments. Midway through each half the harmony becomes slightly adventurous. Beginning with a perky upbeat and peppered with unexpected off-beat accents, its mix of neutrality and quirkiness makes it a plastic, responsive object for Beethoven's scrutiny. He had a lifelong fascination with variations and here he works with the structure, the harmonies, and piquant details more than with the surface of the theme, keeping the melody little in evidence.

== Commentaries ==
Since the work was first published, commentators have tried to find patterns, even an overall plan or structure for this huge, diverse work, but little consensus has been reached. Several early writers sought to discover clear parallels with Johann Sebastian Bach's Goldberg Variations, without great success. Others claimed to have found symmetries, three groups of nine, for example, although the penultimate Fugue had to be counted as five. The work has been analyzed in terms of sonata form, complete with separate 'movements.' What is not disputed, however, is that the work begins with a simple, rather commonplace musical idea, transforms it in many radical ways, and ends with a sequence of variations that are cathartic in the manner of other late Beethoven works.

=== By Maynard Solomon ===
Maynard Solomon in The Late Beethoven: Music, Thought, Imagination expresses this idea symbolically, as a journey from the everyday world ("Diabelli's theme conveys ideas, not only of the national, the commonplace, the humble, the rustic, the comic, but of the mother tongue, the earthly, the sensuous, and, ultimately, perhaps, of every waltzing couple under the sun") to a transcendent reality. For Solomon the structure, if there is any, consists merely of "clusters of variations representing forward and upward motion of every conceivable kind, character and speed". He sees demarcation points at Variations 8, 14 and 20, which he characterizes as three "strategically placed plateaus [which] provide spacious havens for spiritual and physical renewal in the wake of the exertions which have preceded them".). Thus, his analysis yields four sections, variations 1–7, 9–13, 15–19 and 21–33.

=== By William Kinderman ===
The most influential writing on the work today is William Kinderman's Beethoven's Diabelli Variations, which begins by carefully tracing the development of the work through various Beethoven sketchbooks. Of great significance, according to Kinderman, is the discovery that a few crucial variations were added in the final stage of composition, 1822–23 and inserted at important turning-points in the series. A careful study of these late additions reveals that they stand out from the others by having in common a return to, and special emphasis on, the melodic outline of Diabelli's waltz, in the mode of parody.

For Kinderman, parody is the key to the work. He points out that most of the variations do not emphasize the simple features of Diabelli's waltz: "Most of Beethoven's other variations thoroughly transform the surface of Diabelli's theme, and though motivic materials from the waltz are exploited exhaustively, its affective model is left far behind". The purpose of the new variations is to recall Diabelli's waltz so that the cycle does not spiral too far from its original theme. Without such a device, considering the great variety and complexity of the set, Diabelli's waltz would become superfluous, "a mere prologue to the whole." Parody is used because of the banality of Diabelli's theme.

Kinderman distinguishes several forms of "parody", pointing out several examples which have no special structural significance and which were composed in the earlier period, such as the humorous parody of the aria from Mozart's Don Giovanni (Var. 22) and the parody of a Cramer finger exercise (Var. 23). He also mentions allusions to Bach (Vars. 24 and 32) and Mozart (Var. 33). But the added, structural variations recall Diabelli's waltz, not Bach or Mozart or Cramer, and clearly highlight its most unimaginative aspects, especially its repetition of the C major tonic chord with G emphasized as the high note and the static harmony thus created.

The first of the three added variations is No. 1, a "mock-heroic" march which immediately follows Diabelli to open the set dramatically, echoing in the right hand the tonic triad of the theme while the left hand simply walks down in octaves Diabelli's descending fourth. No. 2 even maintains the repeated root-position triad, demonstrating the intent to keep the beginning of the set somewhat anchored. Afterwards however, Diabelli is barely recognizable until Variation 15, the second structural variation, a brief, lightweight piece conspicuously inserted between several of the most powerful variations (Nos. 14, 16 and 17). It recalls and caricatures the original waltz by means of its prosaic harmony. The third and final structural variation, in Kinderman's analysis, is No. 25, which shifts Diabelli's monotonous rhythm from the bass to the treble and fills the bass with a simple figure endlessly repeated in a "lumbering caricature". Arriving comically after the sublime Fughetta's arresting conclusion, it opens the concluding section of the series, from the total unraveling of the following major variations and descent into minor, to the determination of the fugue, to the transcendence of the minuet.

Kinderman summarizes, "Diabelli's waltz is treated first ironically as a march that is half-stilted, half-impressive, and then, at crucial points in the form, twice recapitulated in amusing caricature variations. At the conclusion of the work, in the Fugue and last variation, reference to the melodic head of Diabelli's theme once again becomes explicit – indeed, it is hammered into the ground. But any further sense of the original context of the waltz is lacking. By means of three parody variations, 1, 15, and 25, Beethoven established a series of periodic references to the waltz that draw it more closely into the inner workings of the set, and the last of these gives rise to a progression that transcends the theme once and for all. That is the central idea of the Diabelli Variations."

Kinderman thus sees the work as falling into three sections, Variations 1–10, 11–24 and 25–33. Each section has a certain logic and ends with a clear break. Kinderman asserts that this large-scale structure effectively follows the sonata-allegro form of Exposition-Development-Recapitulation, or more generally, Departure-Return. The first section 1–10 begins with two deliberately conservative variations followed by progressive distancing from the waltz – in tempo, subdivision, extremity of register, and abstraction. Thus the effect of this section is expositional, with a grounded start and a sense of departure. The brilliant variation 10 is a clear climax, with no logical continuation other than a reset – indeed, the subdued, suspended 11 opposes 10 in practically every musical parameter, and the contrast is striking. Thus begun, the second section 11–24 is defined by between-variation contrast, with nearly every sequence a stark juxtaposition, often exploited for comic and dramatic effect. The tension and disorder achieved with these contrasts gives the section a developmental quality, an instability requiring a re-synthesis. The conclusion of the fughetta no. 24, with suspension and fermata, is the second major section break. Out of the solemn silence following 24, 25 enters humorously, the last moment of programmatic contrast and the last structural variation, anchoring the cycle to the theme once more before heading off into the final section. Variations 25–33 form another progressive series, rather than a collection of contrasts. The familiarity of 25 (especially after its predecessors) and the ensuing return to a progressive pattern give this section a recapitulatory quality. First the theme is subdivided and abstracted to the point of disintegration with 25–28. Variations 29–31 then descend into the minor, culminating in the baroque-romantic largo 31, the emotional climax of the work and the groundwork for the sense of transcendence to come. A dominant segue seamlessly heralds the massive fugue 32 – the 'finale' in its relentless energy, virtuosity, and complexity. The intensely suspenseful final transition dissolves into the Minuet, at once a final goal and a denouement. The effect of the full cycle is the distinct sense of a dramatic arch – this could arguably be achieved to some extent from sheer duration; however, the strategically placed structural variations, meticulous sequencing, sweeping departure and return, and inspired final progression augment this effect and demonstrate its intentionality.

=== By Alfred Brendel ===
Alfred Brendel, in his essay "Must Classical Music be Entirely Serious?" takes an approach similar to Kinderman's, making the case for the work as "a humorous work in the widest possible sense" and pointing out that early commentators took a similar view:

Beethoven's first biographer, Anton Schindler, says—and for once I am inclined to believe him—that the composition of this work 'amused Beethoven to a rare degree', that it was written 'in a rosy mood', and that it was 'bubbling with unusual humour', disproving the belief that Beethoven spent his late years in complete gloom. According to Wilhelm von Lenz, one of the most perceptive early commentators on Beethoven's music, Beethoven here shines as the 'most thoroughly initiated high priest of humour'; he calls the variations 'a satire on their theme'.

== The variations ==
=== Theme: Vivace ===
Diabelli's theme
The performer of the audio files in this article is Neal O'Doan.

Diabelli's theme, a waltz with off-beat accents and sharp changes in dynamics, was never intended for dancing. By this time, the waltz was no longer merely a dance but had become a form of art music. Alfred Brendel's suggested title for Diabelli's theme, in his essay "Must Classical Music be Entirely Serious?", making the case for viewing the Diabelli Variations as a humorous work, is Alleged Waltz. Commentators do not agree on the intrinsic musical value of Diabelli's theme.

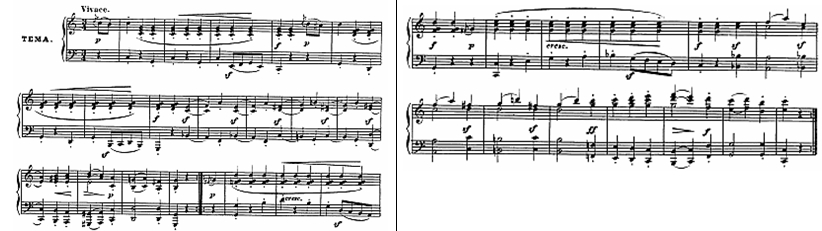

=== Variation 1: Alla marcia maestoso ===
Variations 1 and 2

While Beethoven's first variation stays close to the melody of Diabelli's theme, there is nothing waltz-like about it. It is a strong, heavily accented march in 4/4 time, greatly differing from the character and 3/4 time of the theme. This sharp break from Diabelli announces that the series will not consist of mere decorative variations on a theme. The first variation, according to Tovey, gives "emphatic proof that this is to be a very grand and serious work", describing it as "entirely solemn and grand in style".

Kinderman, on the other hand, whose researches among the Beethoven sketchbooks discovered that Variation 1 was inserted late into the work, deems it a "structural variation", echoing Diabelli more clearly than the non-structural variations and, in this case, parodying the weaknesses of the theme. Its character is, for Kinderman, "pompous" and "mock-heroic". Alfred Brendel takes a view similar to Kinderman's, characterizing this variation as "serious but slightly lacking in brains". The title he offers is March: gladiator, flexing his muscles. Wilhelm von Lenz called it The Mastodon and the Theme—a fable.

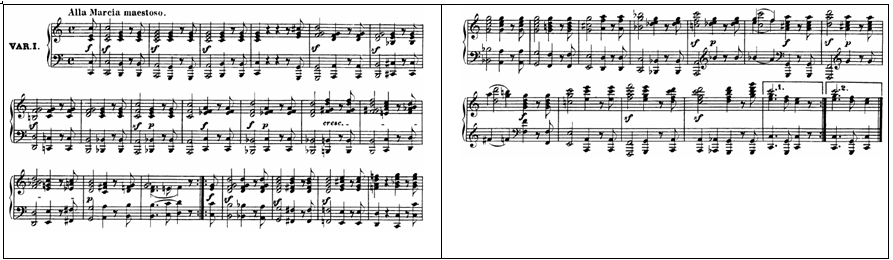

=== Variation 2: Poco allegro ===
This variation was not part of Beethoven's first series but was added somewhat later. While it returns to 3/4 time after the preceding march, it echoes little of Diabelli's theme. It is delicate, with a hushed, tense atmosphere. The only markings are p and leggiermente. It moves in eighth notes, allegro, the treble and bass rapidly alternating throughout the entire piece. Near the end, the tension is increased by syncopations. Brendel suggests the delicacy of this variation by entitling it Snowflakes. Beethoven diverges from Diabelli's structure of two equal parts, each one repeated, by omitting a repeat for the first part. Artur Schnabel, in his famous recording, repeated the first part anyway.

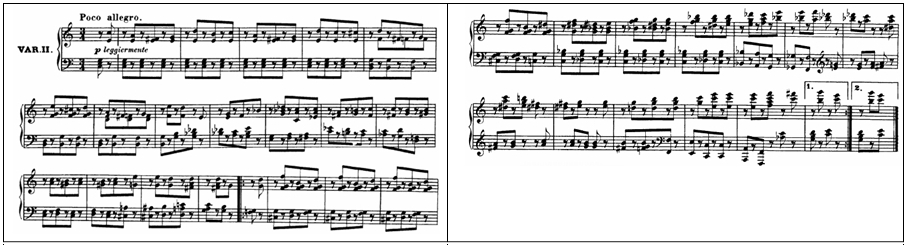

=== Variation 3: L’istesso tempo ===
Variations 3 and 4

Marked dol (dolce), this variation has a strong melodic line, although the original theme is not obvious. Mid-way through each section echoes the rising sequence which occurred at a similar point in Diabelli's theme. In the second half, there is a remarkable pianissimo passage where the treble holds a chord for four full bars while the bass repeats a little three-note figure over and over, eight times, after which the melody proceeds as if nothing out of the ordinary had happened.

This was the first variation in Beethoven's original plan. From the earliest sketchbooks, Beethoven kept it together with the following Variation 4. Both use counterpoint, and the transition between them is seamless. Brendel's title for this variation is Confidence and nagging doubt.

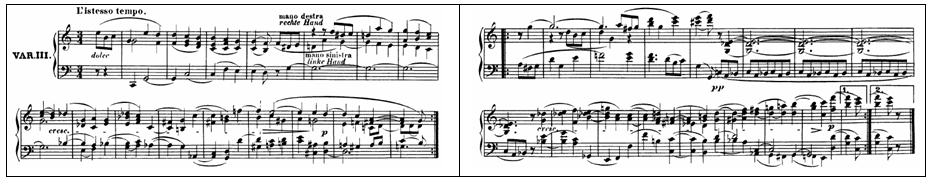

=== Variation 4: Un poco più vivace ===
The steady rise in drama since Variation 2 reaches a high point in this variation. Here the excitement is brought front and centre, both halves of the piece racing in crescendos toward a pair of chords marked forte. The driving rhythm emphasizes the third beat of the bar. Brendel's title for this variation is Learned ländler.

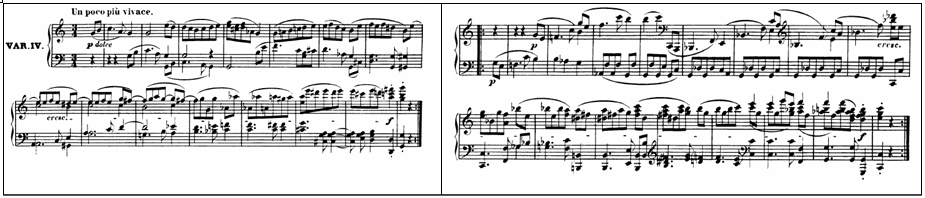

=== Variation 5: Allegro vivace ===
Variations 5–7

This fifth variation is an exciting number with breathtaking rhythmic climaxes. For the first time in the series, there are elements of virtuosity, which will become more pronounced in the variations which immediately follow. Brendel's title for this variation is Tamed goblin.

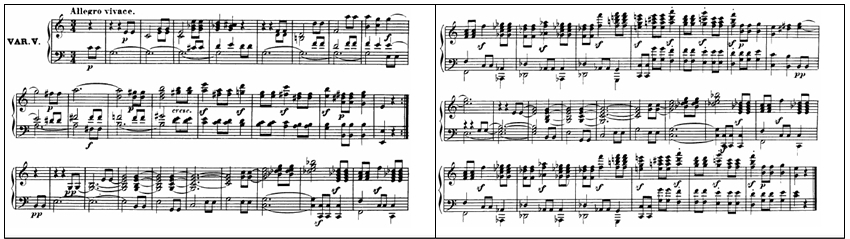

=== Variation 6: Allegro ma non troppo e serioso ===
Both this and the following variations are brilliant, exciting, virtuoso pieces. This sixth variation features a trill in nearly every bar set off against arpeggios and hurried figures in the opposite hand. Brendel's title for this variation is Trill rhetorics (Demosthenes braving the surf). Wilhelm von Lenz called it "In the Tyrol".

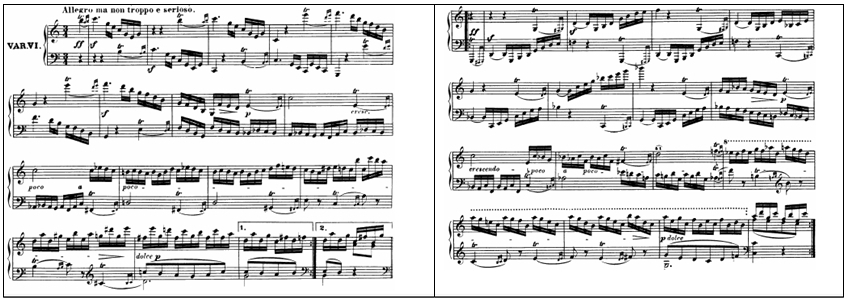

=== Variation 7: Un poco più allegro ===
Sforzando octaves in the bass hand against triplets in the treble make for a brilliant, dramatic effect. Kinderman goes so far as to describe it as "harsh". Brendel's title for this variation is Sniveling and stamping.

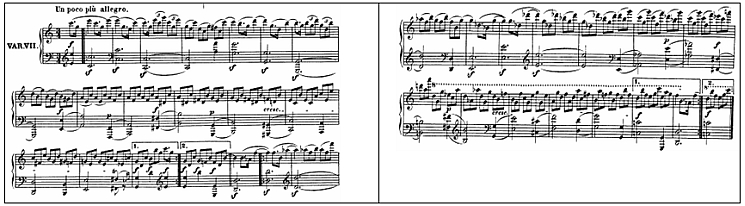

=== Variation 8: Poco vivace ===
Variations 8–10

After the three loud, dramatic variations which precede it, this eighth variation offers relief and contrast in the form of a soft, strongly melodic piece, the melody moving at a stately pace in half- and dotted half-notes, with the bass providing a quiet accompaniment in the form of rising figures. The marking is dolce e teneramente ("sweetly and tenderly"). Brendel's title for this variation is Intermezzo (to Brahms).

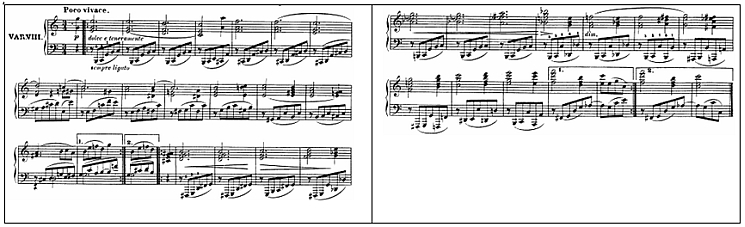

=== Variation 9: Allegro pesante e risoluto ===
This is the first variation to have a minor key. Simple but powerful, Variation 9 is constructed out of the slimmest of materials, consisting of little more than Diabelli's opening grace-note and turn repeated in various registers. The direction is always ascending, building toward a climax. Brendel's title for this variation is Industrious nutcracker. Like Variation No. 1, he characterizes it as "deeply serious but slightly lacking in brains".

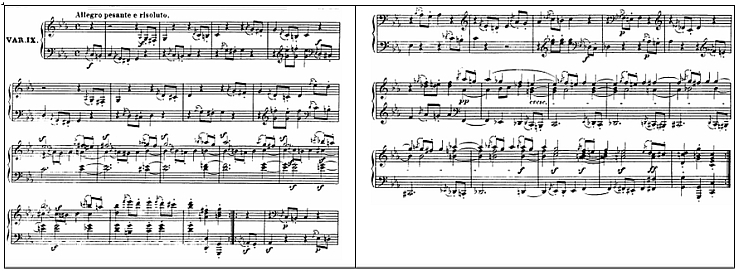

=== Variation 10: Presto ===
Traditionally viewed as the close of a main division of the work, Variation 10 is the most brilliant of all the variations, a break-neck presto with trills, tremolos and staccato octave scales. Tovey comments, "The tenth, a most exciting whirlwind of sound, reproduces all the sequences and rhythms of the theme so clearly that it seems much more like a melodic variation than it really is". Brendel's title for this variation is Giggling and neighing.

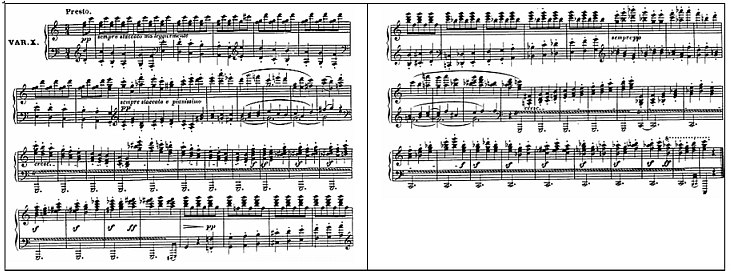

=== Variation 11: Allegretto ===
Variations 11–13

Another variation built out of Diabelli's opening three notes, this one quiet and graceful. Kinderman points out how closely related Variations 11 and 12 are in structure. The opening of this variation appears in the movie Copying Beethoven as the theme of the sonata written by the copyist that Beethoven first ridicules then later, to redeem himself, begins to work on more seriously. Brendel's title for this variation is 'Innocente' (Bülow).

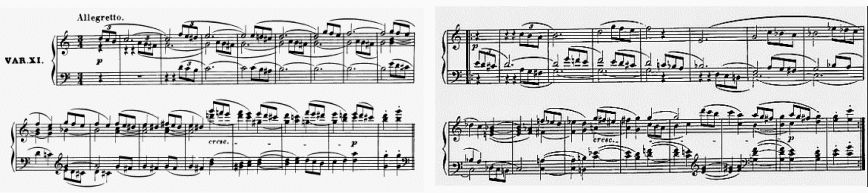

=== Variation 12: Un poco più moto ===
Ceaseless motion with many running fourths. Kinderman sees this variation as foreshadowing Number 20 because of the simple way it exposes the harmonic structure. Tovey points out that it is a development of No. 11. Brendel's title for this variation is Wave Pattern. Variation 12 is another divergence from Diabelli's two-part structure. The first part is unrepeated, while Beethoven writes out the repeat of the second part in full, making small changes.

=== Variation 13: Vivace ===
Powerful, rhythmic chords, forte, each time followed by nearly two bars of silence, then a soft reply. "Eloquent pauses", in von Lenz's words. "Absurd silences", for Gerald Abraham. Barry Cooper sees it as a humorous piece, in which Beethoven "seems almost to poke fun at Diabelli's theme". Diabelli's mild opening turn is turned into the powerful chords, and his repeated chords become a long silence. The sequence is ended with two soft, anti-climactic notes. Brendel's title for this variation is Aphorism (biting).

=== Variation 14: Grave e maestoso ===
Variation 14

The first slow variation, grave e maestoso. Von Bülow comments, "To imbue this wonderful number with what I should like to call the 'high priestly solemnity' in which it was conceived, let the performer's fantasy summon up before his eyes the sublime arches of a Gothic cathedral." Kinderman writes of its "breadth and measured dignity", adding "its spacious nobility brings the work to a point of exposure which arouses our expectations for some new and dramatic gesture." The three variations which follow certainly fulfill those expectations. Brendel's title for this variation is Here He Cometh, the Chosen.

=== Variation 15: Presto scherzando ===
Variations 15–17

One of the last variations composed, Variation 15 is short and light, setting the stage for the following two loud virtuoso displays. For Barry Cooper, this is another humorous variation poking fun at Diabelli's theme. Tovey comments, "The fifteenth variation gives the whole melodic outline [of the theme] so closely that its extraordinary freedom of harmony (the first half actually closes in the tonic) produces no effect of remoteness." Brendel's title for this variation is Cheerful Spook.

Tovey gives a similar analysis of the variations:

The same applies to the large block of two variations, sixteen and seventeen, of which the sixteenth has the melody in the right hand and semiquavers in the left, while the seventeenth has the melody in the bass and the semiquavers above. These variations are so close to the surface of the theme that the amazingly distant keys touched on by their harmonies add only a sense of majesty and depth to the effect without producing complexity.

=== Variation 16: Allegro ===
A virtuoso variation, forte, with trills and ascending and descending broken octaves. Brendel's title for this variation and the following one is Triumph.

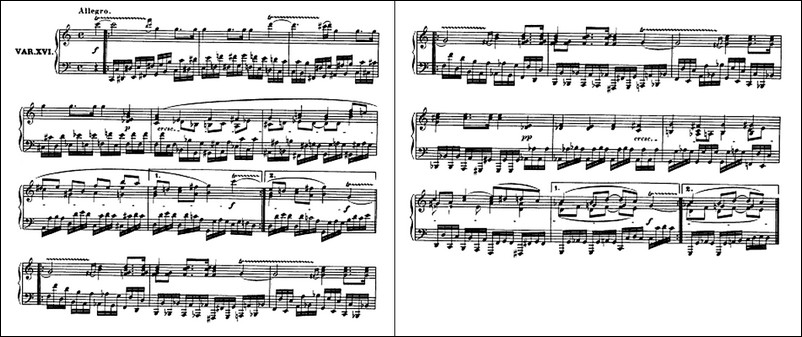

=== Variation 17: Allegro ===
This is the second march after the opening variation, most of it forte, with accented octaves in the bass and ceaseless, hurried figures in the treble. For Tovey, "This brings the first half of the work to a brilliant climax". Brendel's title for this variation and the preceding one is Triumph.

=== Variation 18: Poco moderato ===
Variations 18 and 19

Another variation using the opening turn in Diabelli's waltz, this time with a quiet (dolce), almost meditative character. Brendel's title for this variation is Precious memory, slightly faded.

=== Variation 19: Presto ===
Fast and busy, in sharp contrast to the variation which follows. Von Bülow points out "the canonic dialogue between the two parts". Brendel's title for this variation is Helter-skelter.

=== Variation 20: Andante ===
Variations 20–23

An extraordinarily slow-moving variation consisting almost entirely of dotted half notes in low registers – a striking contrast with the variations immediately before and after. Diabelli's melody is easily identified, but the harmonic progressions (see bars 9–12) are unusual and the overall tonality is ambiguous. Suggesting the title "Oracle", von Bülow recommends "an effect suggestive of the veiled organ-registers". Kinderman writes, "In this great enigmatic slow variation, No. 20, we have reached the still centre of the work ... the citadel of 'inner peace'". Tovey calls it "one of the most awe-inspiring passages in music". Brendel describes this Variation 20 as "hypnotic introspection" and offers as a title Inner sanctum. Liszt called it Sphinx. Diabelli's two-part structure is maintained, but without repeats.

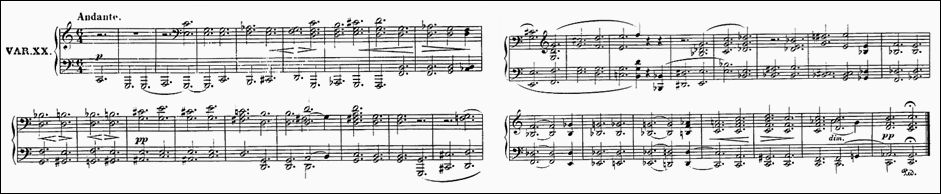

=== Variation 21: Allegro con brio – Meno allegro – Tempo primo ===
An extreme contrast to the preceding Andante. The beginning, in Kinderman's analysis, of variations achieving "transcendence", evoking "the entire musical universe as Beethoven knew it". The accompanying chords repeated so many times at the start of each section and the repeated trills repeated from the highest to the lowest registers ruthlessly exaggerate features of Diabelli's theme. Tovey describes this variation as "startling", but points out that it follows Diabelli's melody clearly and "changes from quick common to slower triple time whenever it reproduces the sequential passages ... in the theme". Brendel's title for this variation is Maniac and moaner. Uhde groups Nos. 21–28 as the "scherzo group", with the tender Fughetta (No. 24) standing in as a "trio".

=== Variation 22: Allegro molto, alla « Notte e giorno faticar » di Mozart ===
A reference to Leporello's aria in the beginning of Mozart's Don Giovanni. The music is rather crudely humorous in style. Because Leporello is complaining that he has to "Work day and night", it is sometimes said that here Beethoven is grumbling about the labour he poured into these variations. It has been suggested, too, that Beethoven is trying to tell us that Diabelli's theme was stolen from Mozart. Brendel's title for this variation is ‘Notte e giorno faticar’ (to Diabelli).

=== Variation 23: Allegro assai ===
For von Bülow, another virtuoso variation to close what he views as the second main division of the work. For Kinderman, a parody of finger exercises published by Johann Baptist Cramer (whom Beethoven did admire as a pianist, if not as a composer). Tovey refers to its "orchestral brilliance and capricious rhythm". Brendel's title for this variation is The virtuoso at boiling-point (to Cramer). He characterizes Nos. 23, 27 and 28 as "one-track minds in an excited state", suggesting an ironic approach.

=== Variation 24: Fughetta (Andante) ===
Variation 24

Lyrical and beautiful, greatly contrasting with the preceding variation, an allusion to Bach. Tovey describes this variation as "a wonderfully delicate and mysterious web of sounds on a figure suggested partly by the treble and partly by the bass of the first four bars of the theme. Acting on a hint given him by the second half of Diabelli's theme, Beethoven inverts this in the second half of the fughetta." Kinderman compares it with the concluding fugue in the last movement of the Sonata in A♭, Op. 110 and to the mood of "certain quiet devotional passages in the Missa Solemnis", both of which were composed in this same period. Brendel's title for this variation is Pure Spirit.

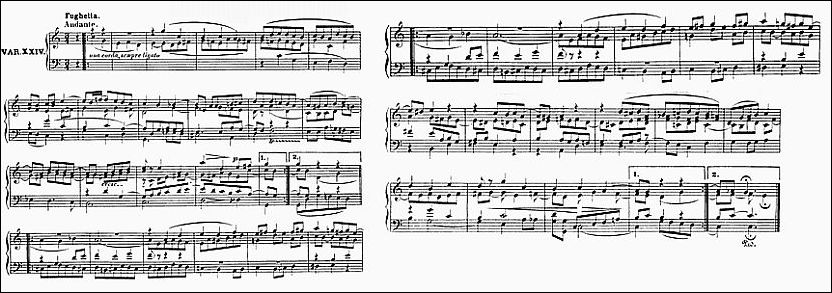

=== Variation 25: Allegro ===
Variations 25–29

Simple chords in the right hand over a ceaseless, busy pattern in the left hand. Tovey notes that it reproduces the opening of each half of Diabelli's theme quite simply, although the rest is very free, adding that "as a reaction from the impressively thoughtful and calm fughetta it has an intensely humorous effect". Brendel's title for this variation is Teutscher (German dance).

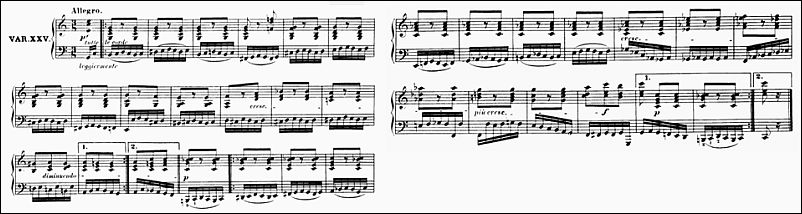

=== Variation 26: (Piacevole) ===
This variation is a deconstruction of the theme, consisting entirely of three-note broken triad inversions and stepwise figures. The switch at the halfway point from descending to ascending passages, a characteristic of the waltz faithfully preserved throughout the work, is seen here. These three final C major variations before the minor section have in common a textural distance from the waltz. Brendel's title for this variation is Circles on the Water.

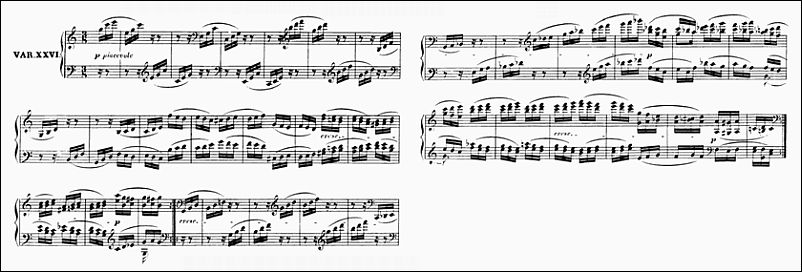

=== Variation 27: Vivace ===
The structure of this variation is similar to the one preceding, in the exclusive use of three-note figures, the descending-to-ascending pattern, and the switch to stepwise passagework in contrary motion at the midpoint of each half. The triplet pattern consisting of a semitone and a third is taken from the rosalias at measures 8–12 of the theme. Brendel's title for this variation is Juggler. He suggests an ironic approach, characterizing Nos. 23, 27 and 28 as "one-track minds in an excited state".

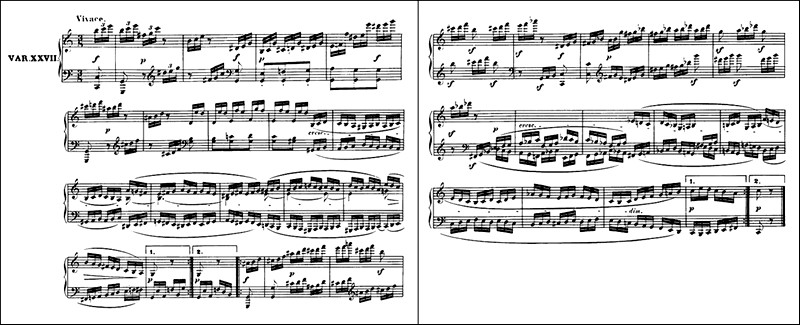

=== Variation 28: Allegro ===
Von Bülow sees this as the close of the third main division of the work: "This Variation ... must be hammered out with wellnigh raging impetuosity... More delicate shading would not be in place – at least in the First Part". (von Bülow)

Tovey writes:

After the twenty-eighth variation has brought this stage of the work to an exhilarating close, Beethoven follows Bach's example .... at precisely the same stage (Variation 25) in the Goldberg Variations, and boldly chooses the point at which he shall enlarge our expectations of further developments more surprisingly than ever before. He gives no less than three slow variations in the minor mode, producing an effect as weighty (even in proportion to the gigantic dimensions of the work) as that of a large slow movement in a sonata.

Brendel points out that as of 1819 there was a single C minor variation (No. 30) and that the late additions of Nos. 29 and 31 expanded the use of the key into "a larger C minor area". Brendel's title for this variation is The rage of the jumping-jack.

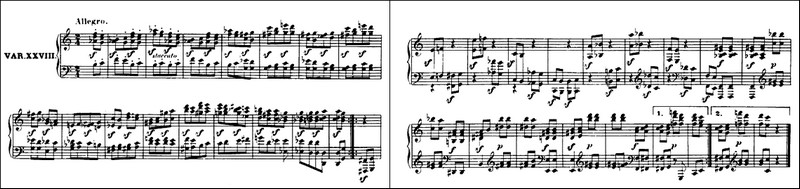

=== Variation 29: Adagio ma non troppo ===
The first of three slow variations, this appears to be the beginning of the end: "The composer transports us into a new, more earnest, even melancholy realm of feeling. It might be regarded as beginning the Adagio of this Variation-sonata; from this Adagio we are carried back, by the grand double fugue, Variation 32, into the original bright sphere of the tone-poem, the general character of which receives its seal in the graceful Minuetto-Finale". (von Bülow) Brendel's title for this variation is Stifled sighs (Konrad Wolff).

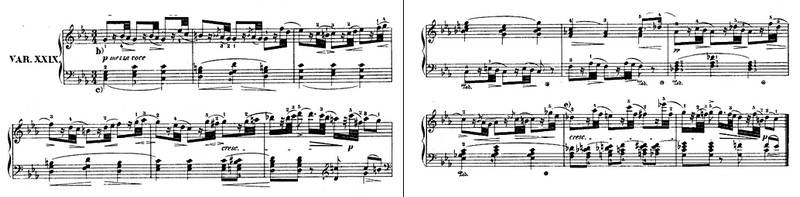

=== Variation 30: Andante, sempre cantabile ===
Variation 30

"A kind of Baroque lament" (Kinderman). Slow and expressive, like the variation which follows. Its final bars lead smoothly to Variation 31. Commentators have used strong language for the concluding section. Tovey describes it as "a phrase so haunting that though Beethoven does not repeat the entire sections of this variation he marks the last four bars to be repeated". Von Bulow says, "We can recognize in these four measures the original germ of the entire romanticism of Schumann". Brendel's title for this variation is Gentle grief. There are only hints of Diabelli's two-part structure.

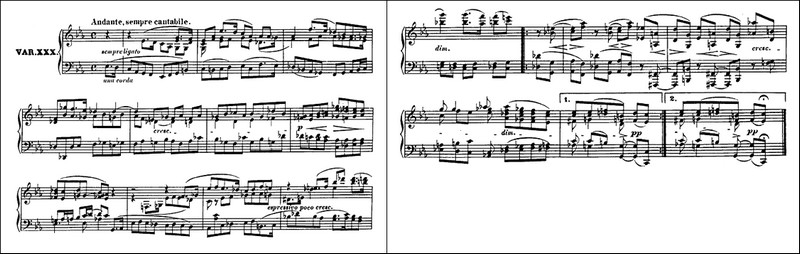

=== Variation 31: Largo, molto espressivo ===
Variation 31

Deeply felt, filled with ornaments and trills, there are many similarities with the arietta of Piano Sonata, Op. 111. Tovey again uses superlatives: "The thirty-first variation is an extremely rich outpouring of highly ornamented melody, which to Beethoven's contemporaries must have been hardly intelligible, but which we, who have learnt from Bach that a great artist's feeling is often more profound where his expression is most ornate, can recognize for one of the most impassioned utterances in all music."

Von Bülow comments, "We should like to style this number, thoughtful and tender alike, a renascence of the Bach Adagio, as the succeeding double fugue is one of the Handel Allegros. Conjoining to these the final Variations, which might be considered as a new birth, so to speak, of the Haydn-Mozart Minuet, we possess, in these three Variations, a compendium of the whole history of music." The ending of this variation, an unresolved dominant seventh, leads naturally to the following fugue. Brendel's title for this variation is To Bach (to Chopin). The structure is a foreshortening of Diabelli's theme.

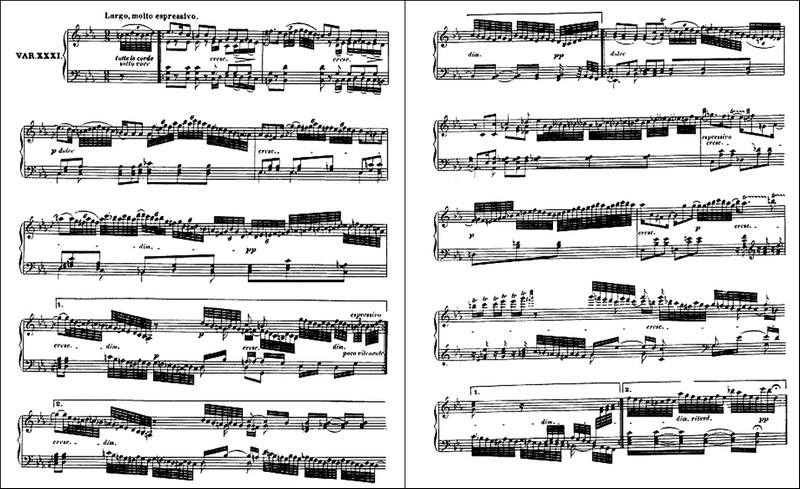

=== Variation 32: Fuga: Allegro ===
Variation 32

While in traditional variation sets a fugue was often used to conclude the work, Beethoven uses his fugue to reach a grand climax, then follows it with a final, quiet minuet. The fugue of Variation 32 is set apart by its foreign key, E♭ major: it is the only variation where C is not the tonic. Structurally, the piece abandons Diabelli's two-part original. Melodically, it is based on Diabelli's falling fourth, used in many of the preceding variations, as well as, most strikingly, on the least inspired, least promising part of Diabelli's theme, the note repeated ten times. The bass in the opening bars takes Diabelli's rising figure and presents it in descending sequence. Out of these flimsy materials, Beethoven builds his powerful triple fugue.

The themes are presented in a variety of harmonies, contexts, lights and shades, and by using the traditional fugal techniques of inversion and stretto. About two thirds through, a fortissimo climax is reached and, following a pause, there begins a contrasting pianissimo section with a constantly hurrying figure serving as the third fugal subject. Eventually, the original two themes of the fugue burst out loudly again and the work races impetuously toward its final climax, a crashing chord and a grand sweep of arpeggios twice down and up the entire keyboard.

The transition to the sublime minuet that forms the final variation is a series of quiet, greatly prolonged chords that achieve an extraordinary effect. In Solomon's words, "The thirty-third variation is introduced by a Poco adagio that breaks the fugue's agitated momentum and finally takes us to the brink of utter motionlessness, providing a curtain to separate the fugue from the minuet." In describing the ending, commentators are often driven to superlatives. Gerald Abraham calls it "one of the strangest passages Beethoven ever wrote". Kinderman describes the transition as "one of the most magical moments in the work":

Beethoven emphasizes the diminished-seventh chord by a kind of arpeggiated cadenza spanning four and then five octaves. When the music comes to rest on this dissonant sonority, it is clear that we have reached the turning point, and are poised at a moment of great musical import. What accounts for the power of the following transition, which has so impressed musicians and critics? (Tovey called it 'one of the most appallingly impressive passages ever written.') One reason is surely the sheer temporal weight of the thirty-two variations that precede it, lasting three-quarters of an hour in performance. At this moment there is finally a halt to the seemingly endless continuity of variations in an unprecedented gesture. But this still fails to explain the uncanny force of the chord progression modulating from E♭ major to the tonic C major of the Finale ..."

Tovey's description of this dramatic moment is:

The storm of sound melts away, and, through one of the most ethereal and—I am amply justified in saying—appallingly impressive passages ever written, we pass quietly to the last variation

Technically, von Bülow admires in the closing four bars "the principle of modulation chiefly developed in the master's last creative period ... the successive step-wise progression of the several parts while employing enharmonic modulation as a bridge to connect even the remotest tonalities."

Brendel's title for this variation is To Handel.

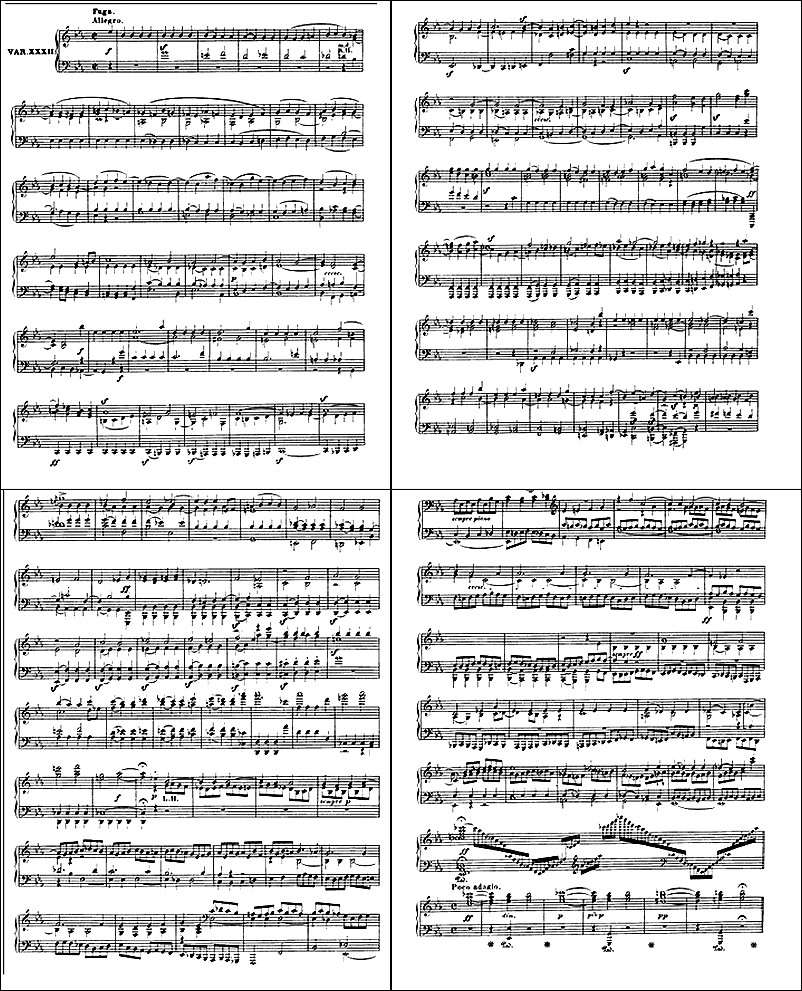

=== Variation 33: Tempo di Menuetto moderato ===
Variation 33

Tovey comments:

It is profoundly characteristic of the way in which (as Diabelli himself seems partly to have grasped) this work develops and enlarges the great aesthetic principles of balance and climax embodied in the 'Goldberg' Variations, that it ends quietly. The freedom necessary for an ordinary climax on modern lines was secured already in the great fugue, placed, as it was, in a foreign key; and now Beethoven, like Bach, rounds off his work by a peaceful return home—a home that seems far removed from these stormy experiences through which alone such ethereal calm can be attained.

Brendel's title for this variation is To Mozart; to Beethoven explaining:

In the coda of the concluding variation, Beethoven speaks on his own behalf. He alludes to another supreme set of variations, that from his own last Sonata, Op. 111, which had been composed before the Diabelli Variations were finished. Beethoven's Arietta from Op. 111 is not only in the same key as Diabelli's 'waltz', but also shares certain motivic and structural features, while the characters of the two themes could not be more disparate. One can hear the Arietta as yet another, more distant, offspring of the 'waltz', and marvel at the inspirational effect of the 'cobbler's patch'.

Solomon describes the closing bars as "the final image – of a tender, songful, profound nostalgia, a vantage point from which we can review the purposes of the entire journey."

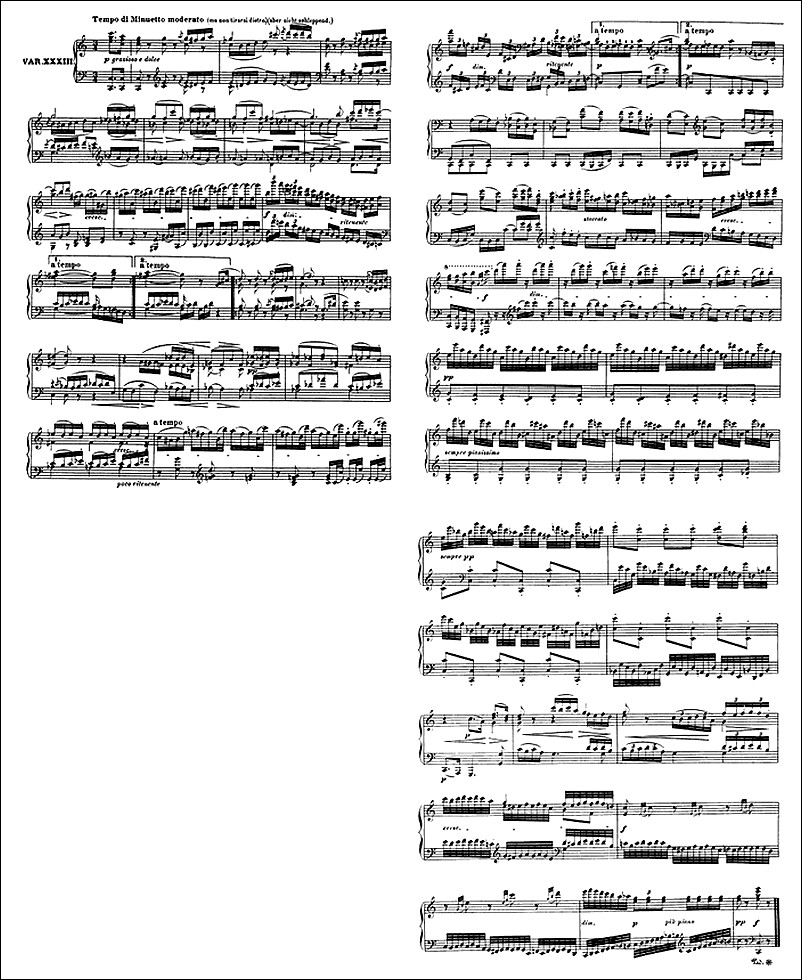

== Works inspired ==
- Dialogue avec 33 variations de L. van Beethoven sur une valse de Diabelli, a 1971 dialogue between writer Michel Butor and Beethoven.
- Diabelli, a 1998 dance by Twyla Tharp set to the full Beethoven score
- 33 Variations, a 2007 play by Moisés Kaufman, explores the story of the variations' composition.

== See also ==
- List of variations on a theme by another composer

== Notes ==
- a. A melody or musical sequence repeated one step, or some fixed interval, higher. Also known as a rosalia, named after an Italian song Rosalia, mia cara. While it can be a simple, unimaginative device, the Grove Dictionary of Music points out that the rosalia has been used effectively by great composers, as in Handel's Hallelujah Chorus in the Messiah ("King of Kings"), the first movement of Mozart's Jupiter Symphony and the finale of Mozart's String Quartet K.575.
- b. Grove Dictionary describes the work by other composers as follows:

Many of the variations are similar in method, since the composers were working in ignorance of one another and since piano virtuosity and variation techniques were widely taught according to familiar principles. Many composers contented themselves with a running figure decorating the theme... A number fastened on an idea developed with great power by Beethoven, such as Beethoven's pupil, the Archduke Rudolph, in an excellent piece. Some produced contrapuntal treatment...; others applied chromatic harmony to the diatonic theme.... The variations by the famous piano virtuosos, especially Friedrich Kalkbrenner, Carl Czerny, Johann Peter Pixis, Ignaz Moscheles, Joseph Gelinek and Maximilian Stadler, are on the whole brilliant but shallow; for Liszt, then only 11, it was his first publication, and his piece is vigorous but hardly characteristic. Schubert's circle contributed some of the better pieces, including those by Ignaz Assmayer and Anselm Hüttenbrenner, though Schubert's own C minor variation is greatly superior. The variations by Joseph Drechsler, Franz Jakob Freystädler, Johann Baptist Gänsbacher and Johann Baptist Schenk are also striking.

== Bibliography ==
- Brendel, Alfred (1990), Music Sounded Out: Essays, Lectures, Interviews, Afterthoughts, New York: Farrar, Straus and Giroux, ISBN 0-86051-666-0
- Cooper, Barry (2000), Beethoven, Master Musicians Series, Oxford: Oxford University Press, ISBN 0-19-816598-6
- Forbes, Elliot, ed. (1967), Thayer's Life of Beethoven, Princeton University Press
- Kinderman, William (1987), Beethoven's Diabelli Variations, Oxford: Clarendon Press, ISBN 0-19-315323-8
- Solomon, Maynard (2004), Late Beethoven: Music, Thought, Imagination, University of California Press, ISBN 0-520-24339-0
- Tovey, Donald Francis (1944), Essays in Musical Analysis: Chamber Music, Oxford University Press
