= Joseph Panny =

Austrian composer and violinist

Joseph Panny (23 October 1794 – 7 September 1838) was an Austrian composer and violinist who lived primarily in Vienna. A contemporary and friend of Ludwig van Beethoven, very few of his works remain in the active repertoire today.

== Compositions ==
He was the composer of one of the second-published set of Diabelli Variations, alongside Franz Schubert, Carl Czerny, a young Franz Liszt, and many other Austrian composers. While in Vienna, Niccolò Paganini commissioned Joseph Panny, fellow violinist and composer, to write the "Tempest" on 25 May 1828 (it was finished on 14 June), while supervising himself the composition.

== See also ==
- Ludlamshöhle
