= Joseph Mayseder =

Austrian composer and violinist (1789–1863)

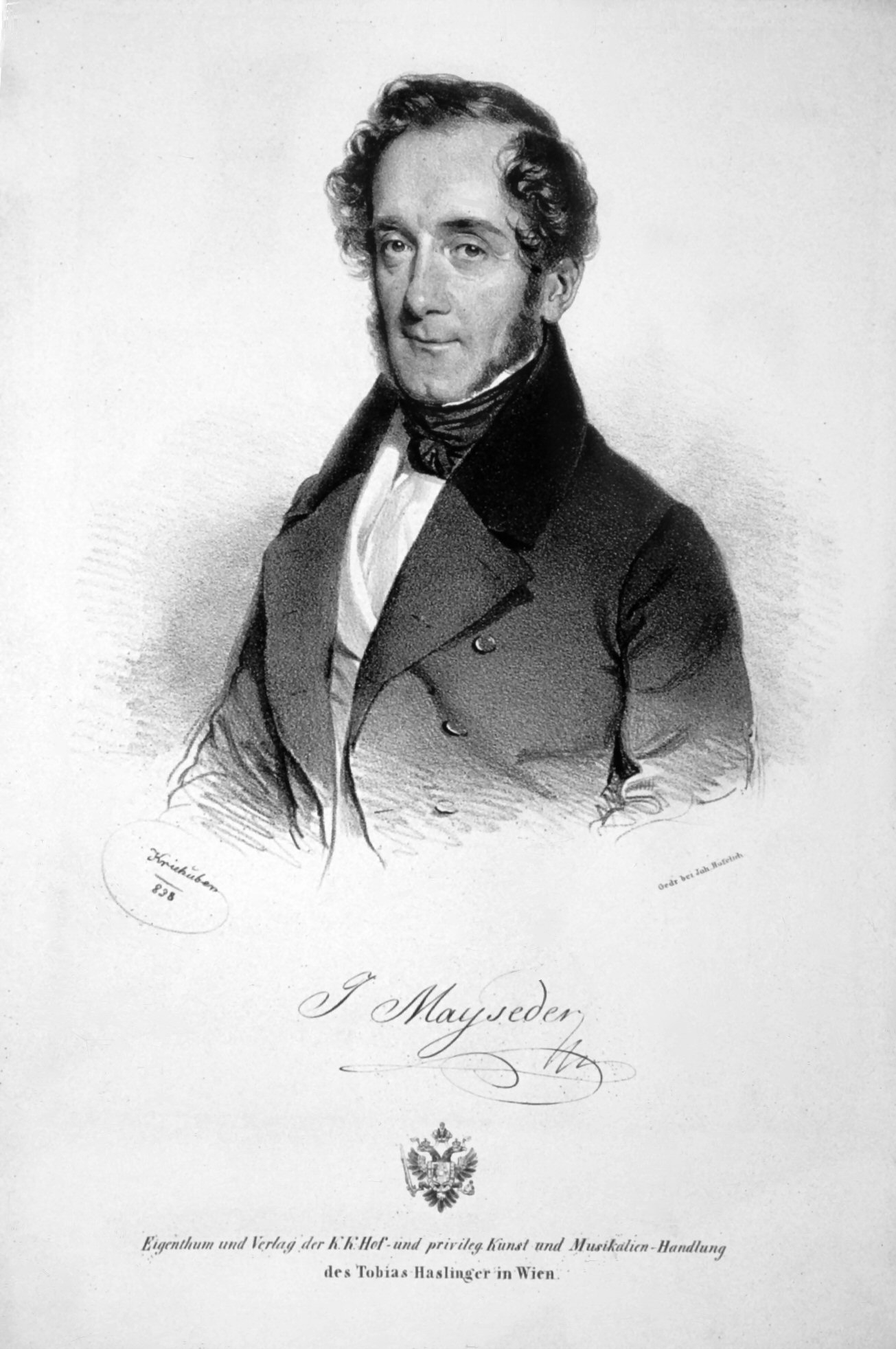
Mayseder in 1838. A lithograph by Josef Kriehuber.

Joseph Mayseder (27 October 1789 – 21 November 1863) was an Austrian violin virtuoso and composer.

== Biography ==
Mayseder showed musical promise from an early age, and was a student of Joseph Suche (1797), Paul Wranitzky (1798) and Ignaz Schuppanzigh. By the age of eleven, he was performing in public concerts at the Augarten in Vienna. He received lessons in composition from Emanuel Aloys Förster.

In 1810, he was appointed concertmaster of the Vienna Court Opera. In 1816, he was the violin soloist of the Hofburg Palace chapel orchestra, which he conducted from 1836. He was a major quartet player, as well as a teacher and composer for his instrument. Among his students were the highly esteemed Heinrich Wilhelm Ernst.

Mayseder was the recipient of multiple awards and honorary memberships. He was appointed to the Accademia Nazionale di Santa Cecilia in Rome, along with Franz Liszt and others. He was awarded the Knight's Cross of the Order of Franz Joseph in 1862, and was an honorary member of the Gesellschaft der Musikfreunde. He was one of 51 composers who contributed to the Vaterländischer Künstlerverein. He was made an honorary citizen of Vienna in 1817.

He was buried in a grave of honour in the Central Cemetery in Vienna. The Maysedergasse in the Viennese Innere Stadt was named after him in 1876.

== Selected works ==
=== Concert music ===
- Three Violin Concertos, op. 22, 26 and 28
- Divertimenti for violin and orchestra, op. 35 and op. 39
- Varié Concerto, op. 43
- Rondeaux brillants for violin and orchestra or string quartet, op. 21, 27, 29 and 30
- Airs variés for violin and orchestra or string quartet, op. 18, 23, 33, 40 (dedicated to Paganini) and 45

=== String quartets ===
- Op. 5 in A major
- Op. 6 in G minor
- Op. 7 in A♭ major
- Op. 8 in F major (Quatuor Brilliant)
- Op. 9 in D major
- Op. 23 in G major
- Op. 62 in F♯ minor
- Op. 66 in D major
- Thèmes variés, with accompaniment of 2nd violin, viola and cello, op. 1, 4, 15

=== String quintets ===
- Op. 50 in B minor
- Op. 51 in A minor
- Op. 55 in D major
- Op. 65 in E♭ major
- Op. 67 in E minor

=== Violin and piano ===
- Sonata, Op. 10
- Sonata, Op. 42

=== Piano trios ===
- Op. 34 in E♭ major
- Op. 41 in F major
- Op. 51 in F major
- Op. 52 in A♭ major
- Op. 57 (Variations)
- Op. 58 in E minor (1843)
- Op. 59 in G major (1844)

=== Piano quartets ===
- Op. 24 in F minor
- 57 variations concertantes in D major, opus 57
- Souvenir à Baden, guirlande musicale en forme de variations concertantes, opus 63

=== Church music ===
- Mass in E♭ major, op. 64 (June 1848, Imperial Chapel of Vienna)
