= Georg Christoph Wagenseil =

Austrian composer (1715–1777)

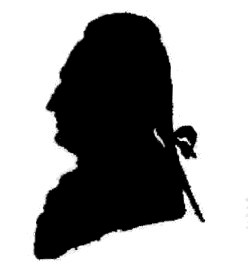
Silhouette of Georg Christoph Wagenseil

Georg Christoph Wagenseil (29 January 1715 – 1 March 1777) was an Austrian composer.

He was born in Vienna, and became a favorite pupil of the Vienna court's Kapellmeister, Johann Joseph Fux. Wagenseil himself composed for the court from 1739 to his death. He also held positions as harpsichordist and organist. His pupils included Johann Baptist Schenk (who was to teach Ludwig van Beethoven), and Marie Antoinette. He traveled little, and died in Vienna having spent most of his life there.

Wagenseil was a well-known musical figure in his day — both Joseph Haydn and Wolfgang Amadeus Mozart are known to have been familiar with his works. His early works are Baroque, while his later pieces are in the Classical style. He composed a number of operas, choral works, symphonies, concertos, chamber music and keyboard pieces.

== Compositions ==
=== Operas ===
- La generosità trionfante (1745)
- Ariodante (1745)
- La clemenza di Tito (1745)
- Demetrio (1746)
- Alexander der Grosse in Indien (1748)
- Il Siroe (1748)
- L'olimpiade (1749)
- Andromeda (1750)
- Antigono (1750)
- Euridice (1750)
- Armida placata (1750)
- Vincislao (1750)
- Le cacciatrici amanti (1755)
- Prometeo assoluto (1762)
- Catone (?)
- Merope (1766)

=== Concertos ===
- Concerto for alto trombone in E♭ major
- Concerto for cello and orchestra in A major, WV 348
- Concerto for cello and orchestra in C major, WV 341
- Concerto for flute, strings, and continuo in D major, WWV 342
- Concerto for flute, strings, and continuo in G major, WWV 347
- Concerto for fortepiano, violin, and strings in A major, WWV 325
- Concerto for harpsichord/organ and strings No. 1 in C major
- Concerto for harpsichord/organ and strings No. 2 in A major
- Concerto for harpsichord/organ and strings No. 4 in E♭ major
- Concerto for harpsichord/organ and strings No. 5 in B♭ major
- Concerto for harpsichord/organ and strings No. 6 in B♭ major
- Concerto for oboe, bassoon, winds, strings, and continuo in E♭ major, WWV 345
- Concerto for trombone and orchestra in E♭ major
- Concerto for harp and orchestra in G major
- Concertor for harp and strings in F major, WWV 281

=== Symphonic works ===
- Sinfonia in G minor
- Symphonia in C major
- Symphony in A major, WV 421
- Symphony in A major, WV 432
- Symphony in B♭ major, WV 441
- Symphony in C major, WV 351
- Symphony in C major, WV 361
- Symphony in D
- Symphony in D (WV 374, D10), Op. 3/1
- Symphony in E major
- Symphony in E major, WV 393
- Symphony in F major, WV 398
- Symphony in G major, WV 413
- Symphony in B♭ major, WV 438

=== Chamber works ===
- Sonata for 3 cellos and double bass (or 2 violas, cello, and double bass) No.4 in A major
- Sonata for 3 cellos and double bass (or 2 violas, cello, and double bass) No.6 in G major
- Sonata for 3 cellos and double bass (or 2 violas, cello, and double bass) No.3 in C major ("Suite des pièces")
- Sonata for 3 cellos and double bass (or 2 violas, cello, and double bass) No.1 in D major
- Sonata for 3 cellos and double bass (or 2 violas, cello, and double bass) No.2 in F major
- Sonata for 3 cellos and double bass (or 2 violas, cello, and double bass) No.5 in B major
- Suite de pièces, for 2 clarinets, 2 horns, 2 bassoons, and piano in E♭ major
- Flute Sonata in E minor

=== Keyboard works ===
- Divertimento for keyboard in F major( from 6 Divertimenti, Op 3)
- Suite for organ in C major

=== Vocal works ===
- Confitebor, for trombone and voice
