= Johann Baptist Gänsbacher =

Austrian composer (1778–1844)

Johann Baptist Gänsbacher (8 May 1778 in Sterzing – 13 July 1844 in Vienna), was an Austrian musical composer, from the County of Tyrol.

His father, a schoolmaster and teacher of music, undertook his son's early education, which the boy continued under various masters until 1802 when he became the pupil of Abbé G. J. Vogler.

Gänsbacher is known for his connection with this artist and with his fellow pupils, more perhaps than his own merits. During his second stay with Vogler in 1810, living at Darmstadt, he became acquainted with Weber and Meyerbeer, and a close, long-lasting friendship sprang up among the three young musicians.

In 1823–1824, he was one of the 50 composers who composed a variation on a waltz by Anton Diabelli for Vaterländischer Künstlerverein.

He was the director of music at St. Stephen's Cathedral, from 1823 until his death in Vienna, composing whilst working there. His compositions consist chiefly of church music, including 17 masses, besides litanies, motets, and offertories. He also wrote several sonatas, a symphony, and dramatic musical works.
