= Johann Baptist Schenk =

Austrian composer and teacher (1753–1836)

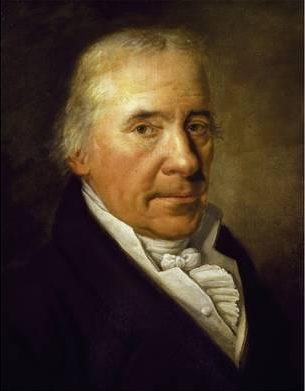
Johann Baptist Schenk

Johann Baptist Schenk (30 November 1753 – 29 December 1836) was an Austrian composer and teacher.

Schenk was born in Wiener Neustadt. While still a boy, he composed songs, dances and symphonies, and became a proficient violinist and keyboard and wind instrument player. In 1773 he went to Vienna to study with Georg Christoph Wagenseil. Beginning in 1777 he was composing religious works for Saint Stephen's Cathedral. In the 1780s he became a prolific composer of incidental music for plays and singspiele. Mozart was a good friend of Schenk and Beethoven was among his students in 1793–1794. Schenk died in Vienna aged 83.

His best-known singspiel is Der Dorfbarbier which premiered in 1796. His other compositions include numerous cantatas, ten symphonies, several concertos (including a well-known one for harp), and five string quartets. In around 1823, he composed a variation on a waltz by Anton Diabelli (D 718), being one of the 51 composers who contributed to the Vaterländischer Künstlerverein. Schenk's Autobiographische Skizze (1830) mentions a few early works, now lost, but is factually unreliable; i.a. its gives his birth date as 30 November 1761.
