= Joseph Huglmann =

Austrian composer

Joseph Huglmann (also Josef Hügelmann) (1768, Vienna - ?) was a composer active in Vienna in the early nineteenth century. He wrote a variation (op. 3, 1801), and the Bibliothek der Gesellschaft der Musikfreunde in Wien had three piano compositions by his hand. Among his compositions is variation number 15 for Part II of the Vaterländischer Künstlerverein.
