= Maximilian Stadler =

Austrian composer, musicologist and pianist

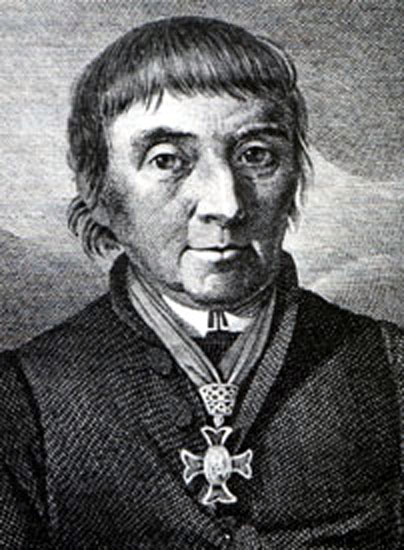
Maximilian Johann Karl Dominik Stadler, abbé Stadler.

Maximilian Johann Karl Dominik Stadler, Abbé Stadler, born August 1748, in Melk – 8 November 1833, in Vienna), was an Austrian composer, musicologist and pianist.

In 1766, he entered the Benedictine Monastery in Melk Abbey, where he served as Benedictine monk, and then Prior from 1784 to 1786. In 1786, he was Abbot of the Monastery of Lilienfeld, and from 1789 in Kremsmünster Monastery.

From 1791, he lived in Linz and from 1796 in Vienna, where he settled the estate of Wolfgang Amadeus Mozart and was in charge of the Imperial Music Archive.

From 1803, he worked as a parish priest of Großkrut in Lower Austria, until he retired in 1816 to Vienna to devote himself to music.

Stadler was among the most prominent personalities of Viennese musical life at the turn of the 18th and 19th centuries. He befriended Mozart, Joseph Haydn, Ludwig van Beethoven and Franz Schubert and wrote numerous essays on Mozart, as well as completed some of Mozart's unfinished works. He worked on an unfinished Materialen zur Geschichte der Musik unter den österreichischen Regenten (Materials on the History of Music under the Austrian Regency), regarded as the first history of music in Austria. Most of his works are in the Austrian National Library and the Gesellschaft der Musikfreunde, in Vienna.

During 1823 to 1824, he was one of the fifty composers who composed a variation on a waltz by Anton Diabelli for Vaterländischer Künstlerverein.

== Works ==
- Oratorium Die Befreyung von Jerusalem (The Deliverance of Jerusalem), 1813
- 3 Cantatas
- Songs
- Church music, including two Requiems and numerous smaller church music
- Works for keyboard instruments
- Music theory and historical writings
