= Gottfried Rieger =

Czech-German composer

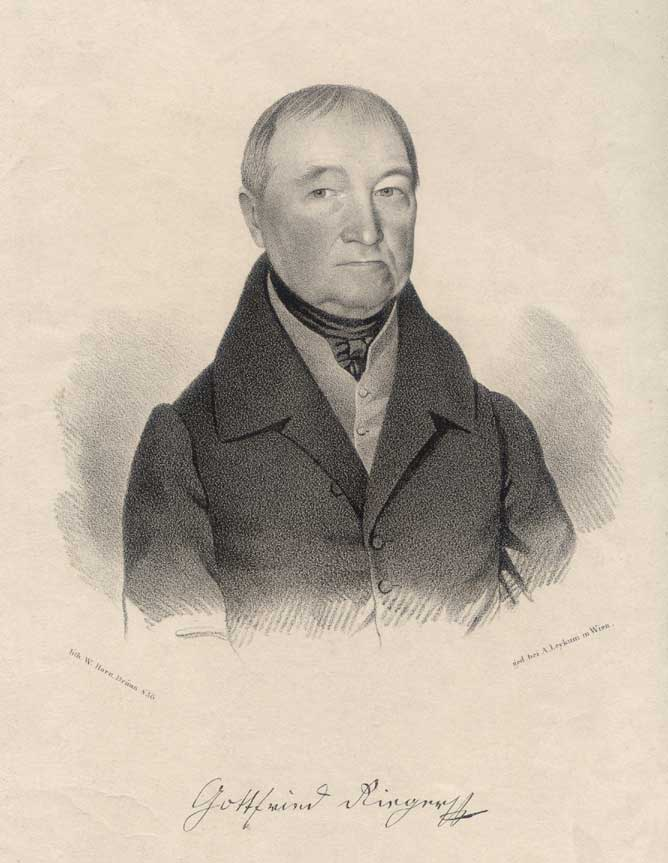

Gottfried Rieger (1 May 1764 – 13 October 1855) was a Czech-German composer, conductor and teacher. He lived for many years at Brno in what is today the Czech Republic.

== Life ==
Rieger was born on 1 May 1764 in Tropplowitz in Austrian Silesia in the Kingdom of Bohemia, Habsburg monarchy (now Opavice, part of Město Albrechtice in the Czech Republic). His father owned some land here on the Geppersdorf Estate, and was a musician.

He received music lessons from his father, and played at village festivals. He became at age 13 a member of the private orchestra at Geppersdorf Castle (today Linhartovy Castle) of Count Josef von Sedlnitzky. Here he learned to play more instruments. On the recommendation of Carl Ditters von Dittersdorf, he studied music theory with Father Damasus Brosmann, rector of the Piarist monastery at Bílá Voda.

He moved to Brno in 1787, where from 1790 he directed the orchestra of the civic theatre, and was a music teacher. Count Haugwitz offered him in 1805 the post of Kapellmeister at his castle at Náměšť nad Oslavou, and he was resident there until 1808; he then returned to Brno, resuming as music teacher and for two more years director of the theatre orchestra. He established a music institute in the city in 1828.

Rieger died in Brno on 13 October 1855, aged 91; at his funeral at Brno Cathedral, a requiem composed by him was performed.

== Compositions and publications ==
Compositions include an opera, Das wütende Heer (1787); a Schauspiel mit Gesang, Die Totenglocke um Mitternacht oder Wendelin von Höllenstein (1788); several cantatas, two requiems, piano concertos, songs and chamber music.

A textbook on basso continuo and harmony was published in 1833.
