= Anton Diabelli =

Austrian music publisher, editor and composer

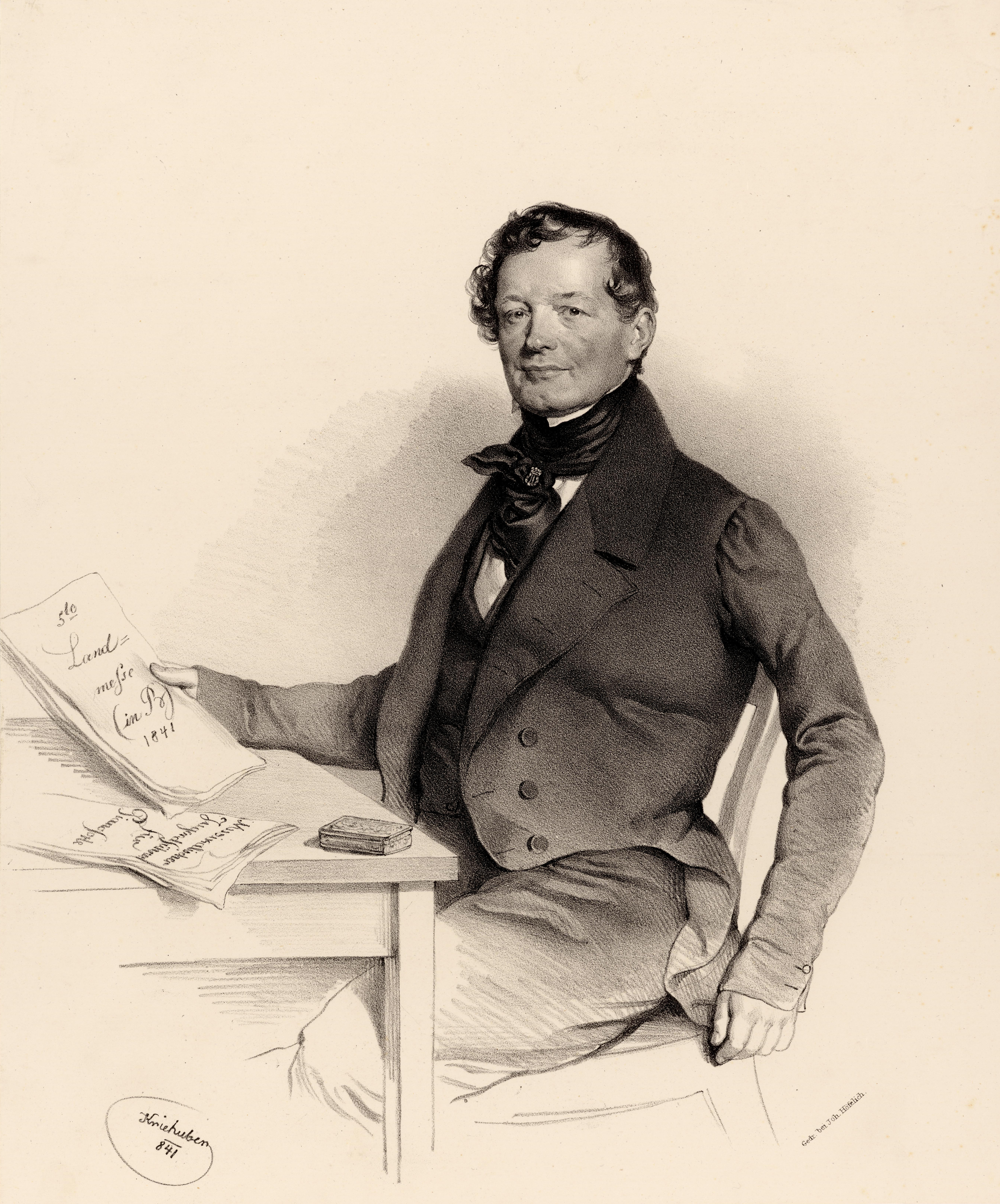
Anton Diabelli, lithograph by Josef Kriehuber, 1841

Anton (or Antonio) Diabelli (5 September 1781 – 8 April 1858) was an Austrian music publisher, editor, and composer. Best known in his time as a publisher, he is most familiar today as the composer of the waltz on which Ludwig van Beethoven wrote his set of thirty-three Diabelli Variations.

== Early life ==
Diabelli was born in Mattsee in Austria, then in the Archbishopric of Salzburg. A musical child, he sang in the boys' choir at Salzburg Cathedral where he is believed to have taken music lessons with Michael Haydn. By the age of 19 Diabelli had already composed several important compositions including six masses.

Diabelli was trained to enter the priesthood and in 1800 joined the monastery at Raitenhaslach, Bavaria. He remained there until 1803, when Bavaria closed all its monasteries.

== Career ==
In 1803 Diabelli moved to Vienna and began teaching piano and guitar and found work as a proofreader for a music publisher. During this period he learned the music publishing business while continuing to compose. In 1809 he composed his comic opera, Adam in der Klemme. In 1817 he started a music publishing business and in 1818 he formed a partnership with Pietro Cappi to create the music publishing firm of Cappi & Diabelli.

Cappi & Diabelli became well known by arranging popular pieces so they could be played by amateurs at home. A master of promotion, Diabelli selected widely-accessible music such as famous opera tune arrangements, dance music and popular new comic theatre songs.

The firm soon established a reputation in more serious music circles by championing the works of Franz Schubert. Diabelli recognized the composer's potential and became the first to publish Schubert's work with "Erlkönig" in 1821. Diabelli's firm continued to publish Schubert's work until 1823 when an argument between Cappi and Schubert terminated their business. The following year Diabelli and Cappi parted ways, Diabelli launching a new publishing house, Diabelli & Co., in 1824. Following Schubert's early death in 1828 Diabelli purchased a large portion of the composer's massive musical estate from Schubert's brother Ferdinand. As Schubert had hundreds of unpublished works, Diabelli's firm was able to publish "new" Schubert works for more than 30 years after the composer's death.

Diabelli's publishing house expanded throughout his life, before he retired in 1851, leaving it under the control of Carl Anton Spina. When Diabelli died in 1858 Spina changed the firm's name to “C.A. Spina Vormals Diabelli” and published much music by Johann Strauss II and Josef Strauss. In 1872 the firm was taken over by Friedrich Schreiber and in 1876 it merged with the firm of August Cranz who bought the company in 1879 and ran it under his name.

Diabelli died in Vienna at the age of 76.

== Compositions ==
Diabelli composed a number of well-known Classical works, including an operetta called Adam in der Klemme, several masses, songs and numerous piano and classical guitar pieces. Numerically his guitar pieces form the largest part of his works. His pieces for piano four hands are popular.

Diabelli's composition Pleasures of Youth: Six Sonatinas is a collection of six sonatinas depicting a struggle between unknown opposing forces. This is suggested by the sharp and frequent change in dynamics from forte to piano. When forte is indicated the pianist is meant to evoke a sense of wickedness, thus depicting the antagonist. In contrast the markings of piano represent the protagonist.

=== Diabelli Variations ===
Diabelli's Theme
Performed by Neal O'Doan

The composition for which Diabelli is now best known was actually written as part of an adventuring story. In 1819, as a promotional idea, he decided to try to publish a volume of variations on a "patriotic" waltz he had penned expressly for this purpose, with one variation by every important Austrian composer living at the time, as well as several significant non-Austrians. The combined contributions would be published in an anthology called Vaterländischer Künstlerverein. Fifty-one composers responded with pieces, including Beethoven, Schubert, Archduke Rudolph of Austria, Franz Xaver Wolfgang Mozart (jun.), Moritz, Prince of Dietrichstein, Heinrich Eduard Josef Baron von Lannoy, Ignaz Franz Baron von Mosel, Carl Czerny, Johann Nepomuk Hummel, Ignaz Moscheles, Simon Sechter, and the eight-year-old Franz Liszt (although it seems Liszt was not invited personally, but his teacher Czerny arranged for him to be involved). Czerny was also enlisted to write a coda. Beethoven, however, instead of providing just one variation, provided 33, and his formed Part I of Vaterländischer Künstlerverein. They constitute what is generally regarded as one of the greatest of Beethoven's piano pieces and as the greatest set of variations of their time, and are generally known simply as the Diabelli Variations, Op. 120. The other 50 variations were published as Part II of Vaterländischer Künstlerverein.

== Cultural references ==
A sonatina of Diabelli's, presumably Sonatina in F major, Op. 168, No. 1 (I: Moderato cantabile), provides the title and a motif for the French novella Moderato Cantabile by Marguerite Duras.

== See also ==
- List of Austrians in music
- Romantic guitar

== Published music and further reading ==
- Anton Diabelli's guitar works – a thematic catalogue with an introduction; Doctoral Thesis by Jukka Savijoki (Sibelius Academy; 1996)
- Anton Diabelli's Guitar Works: A Thematic Catalogue by Jukka Savijoki (Editions Orphée)
- Rischel & Birket-Smith's Collection of guitar music Det Kongelige Bibliotek, Denmark
- Boije Collection The Music Library of Sweden
- www.karadar.com/Dictionary/diabelli.html
- Free scores by Anton Diabelli at the International Music Score Library Project (IMSLP)
- Free scores by Anton Diabelli in the Choral Public Domain Library (ChoralWiki)
- Free scores at the Mutopia Project
