= Variation (music) =

Musical form

Schubert – Impromptu in B-flat
Schubert's Impromptu in B-flat (D 935) No. 3; theme and variations based on a theme from Schubert's Rosamunde

In music, variation is a formal technique where material is repeated in an altered form. The changes may involve melody, rhythm, harmony, counterpoint, timbre, orchestration or any combination of these.

Variation is often contrasted with musical development, which is a slightly different means to the same end. Variation depends upon one type of presentation at a time, while development is carried out upon portions of material treated in many different presentations and combinations at a time.

== Variation techniques ==
Mozart's Twelve Variations on "Ah vous dirai-je, Maman" (1785), a French folk song known in the English-speaking world as "Twinkle, Twinkle, Little Star", exemplifies a number of common variation techniques. Here are the first eight bars of the theme:

Ah je vous dirai maman theme

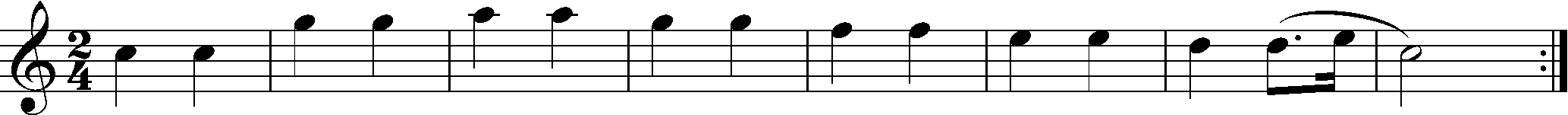
Ah je vous dirai maman theme, bars 1–8

=== Melodic variation ===
Mozart's first variation decorates and elaborates the plain melodic line:

Ah je vous dirai maman, variation 1

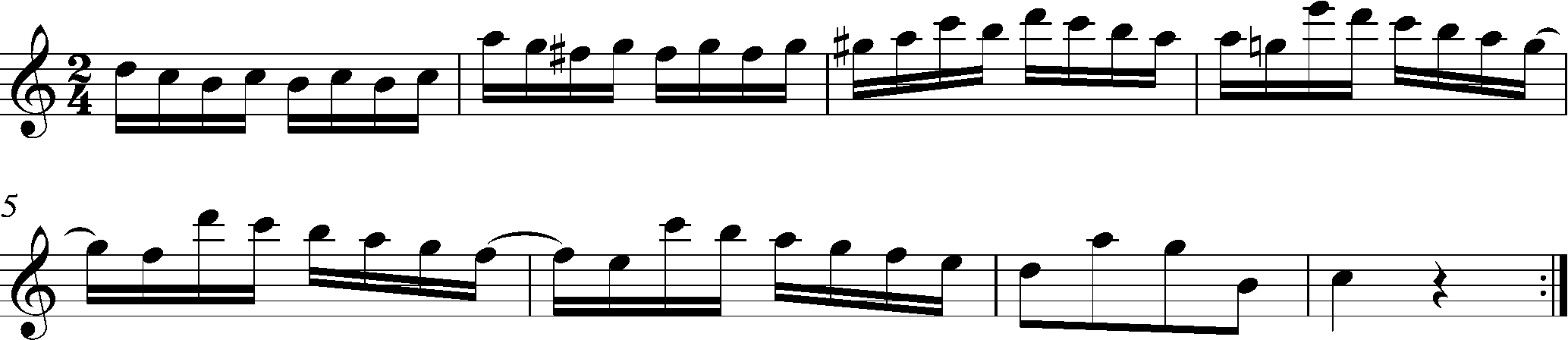
Ah je vous dirai maman, variation 1

=== Rhythmic variation ===
The fifth variation breaks up the steady pulse and creates syncopated off-beats:

Ah je vous dirai maman, variation 5

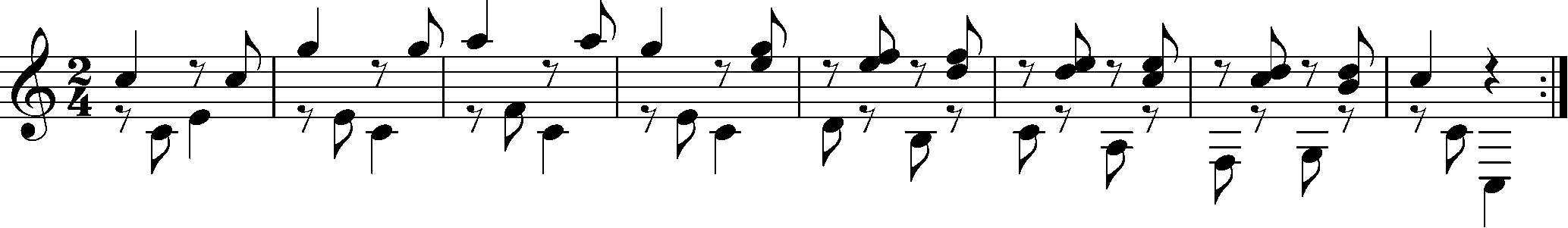
Ah je vous dirai maman, variation 5

=== Harmonic variation ===
The seventh variation introduces powerful new chords, which replace the simple harmonies originally implied by the theme with a prolongational series of descending fifths:

Ah je vous dirai maman, variation 7

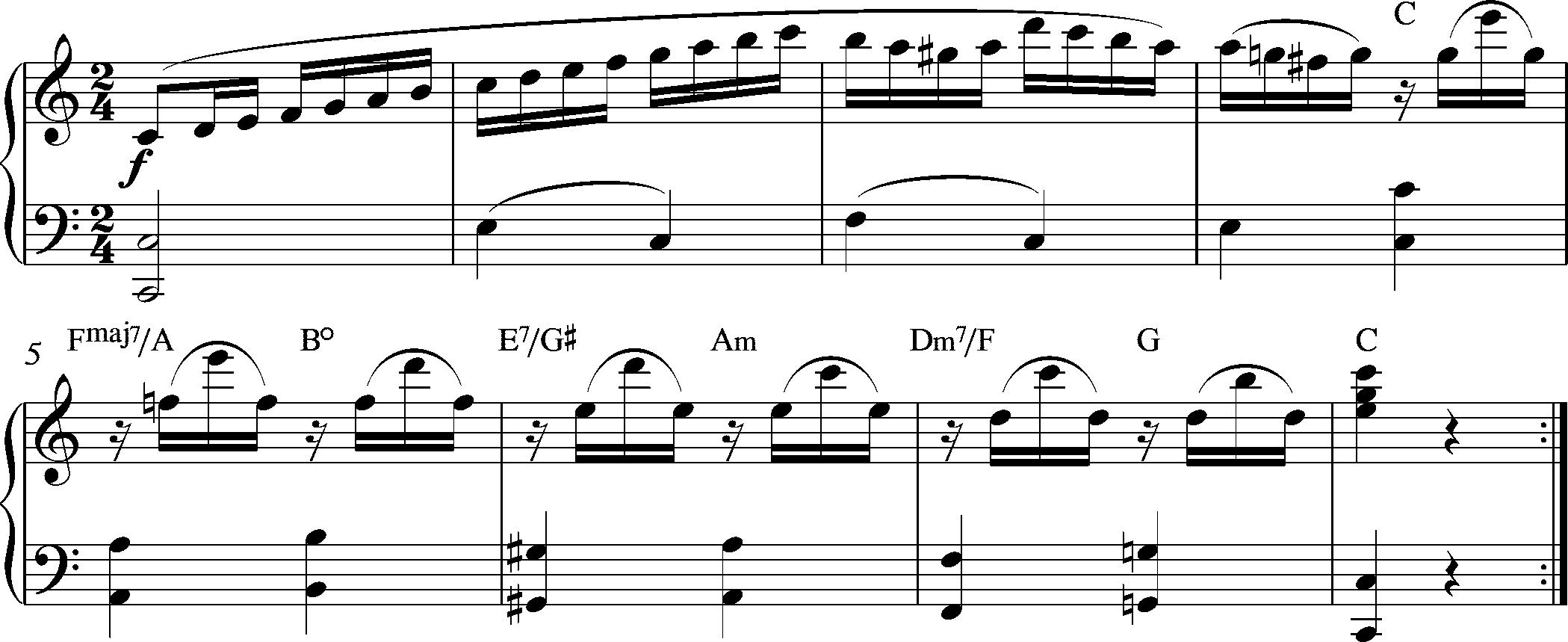
Ah je vous dirai maman, variation 7

=== Minor mode ===
In the elaborate eighth variation, Mozart changes from the major to the parallel minor mode, while combining three techniques: counterpoint, suspensions and imitation:

Ah je vous dirai maman, variation 8

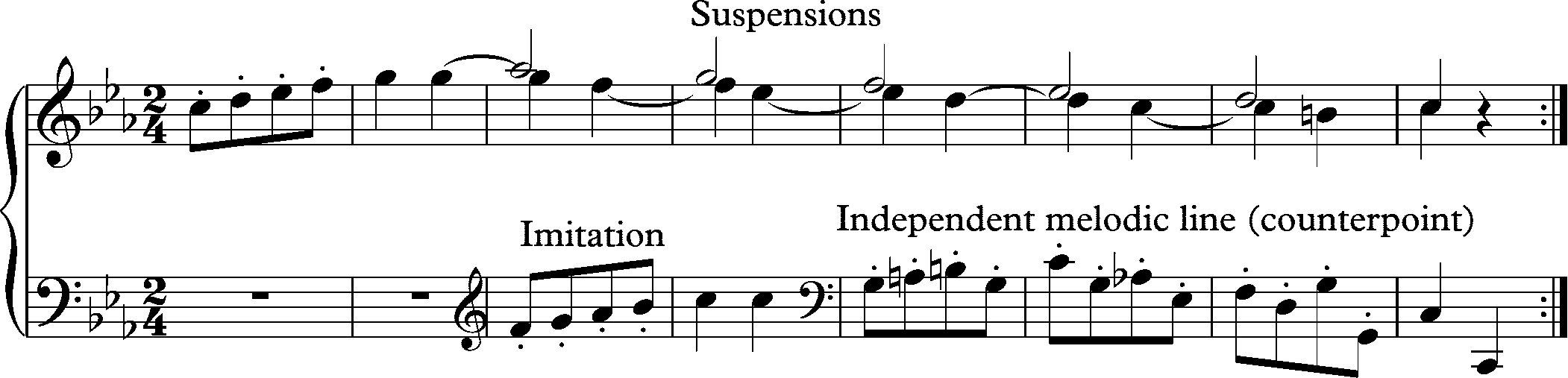
Ah je vous dirai maman, variation 8

=== Other examples ===
Variation techniques are frequently used within pieces that are not themselves in the form of theme and variations. For example, when the opening two-bar phrase of Chopin's Nocturne in F minor returns later in the piece, it is instantly repeated as an elegant melodic re-working:

Chopin Nocturne in F minor

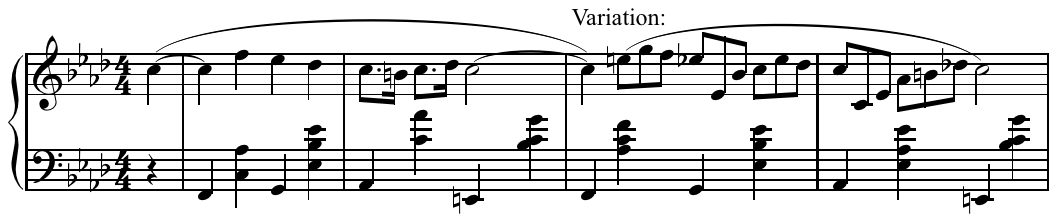
Phrase and variation from Chopin's Nocturne in F minor

Debussy's piano piece "Reflets dans l'eau" (1905) opens with a sequence of chords:

Debussy's "Reflets dans l'eau" opening 2 bars

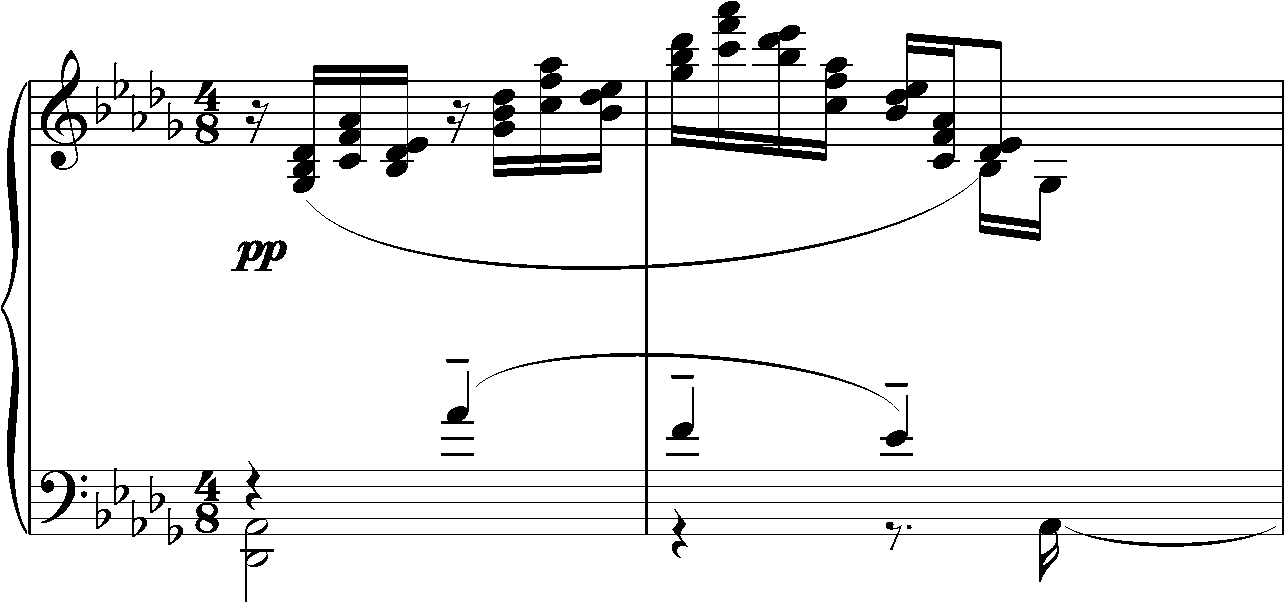
Debussy's "Reflets dans l'eau", opening bars

These chords open out into arpeggios when they return later in the piece:

Debussy's "Reflets dans l'eau" varied recapitulation of the opening

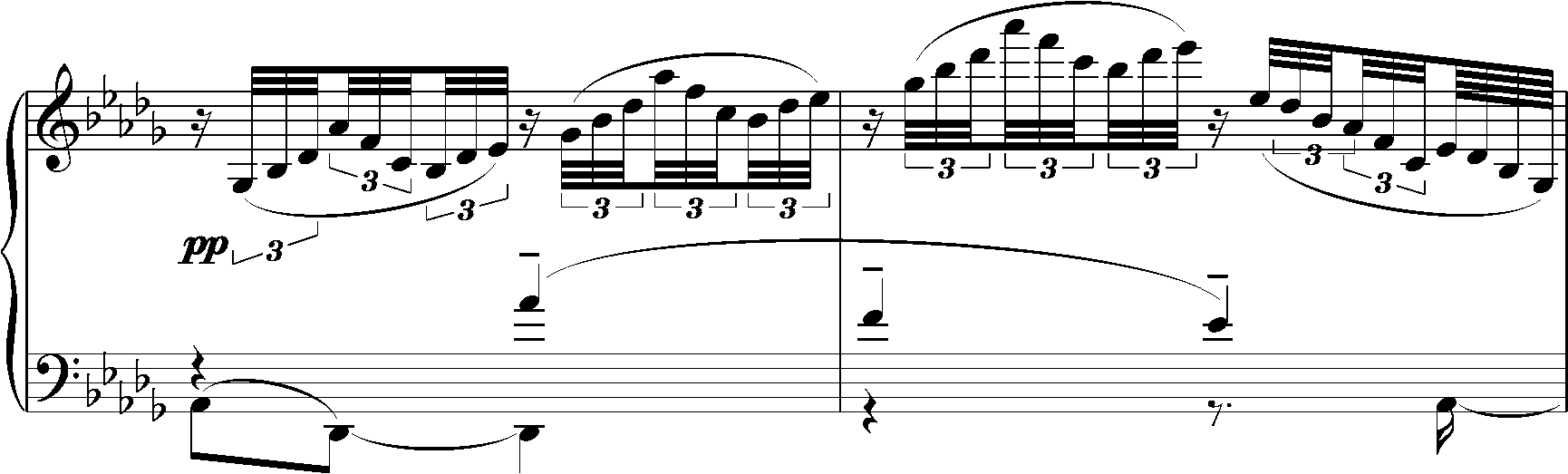
Debussy's "Reflets dans l'eau", varied recapitulation of the opening

Sometimes melodic variation occurs simultaneously with the original. In Beethoven's "Waldstein" piano sonata, the main second-subject theme of the opening movement, which is in sonata form, is heard in the pianist's left hand, while the right hand plays a decorated version. (See also heterophony.)

Beethoven's "Waldstein" sonata 1st movement, second subject

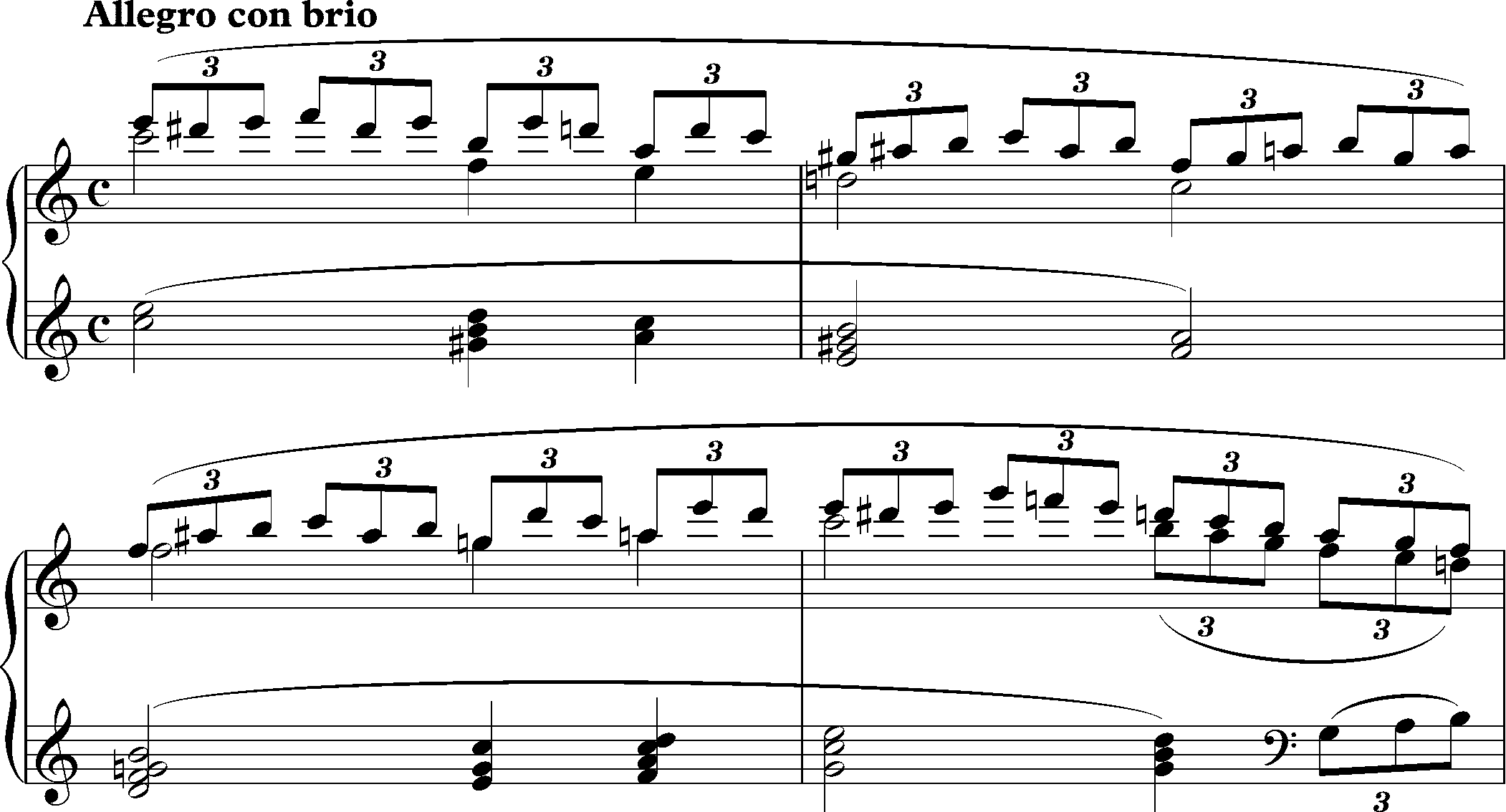
Beethoven's "Waldstein" sonata, 1st movement, bars 204–208

While most variations tend to elaborate on the given theme or idea, there are exceptions. In 1819, Anton Diabelli commissioned Viennese composers to create variations on a waltz that he had composed:

Theme by Anton Diabelli

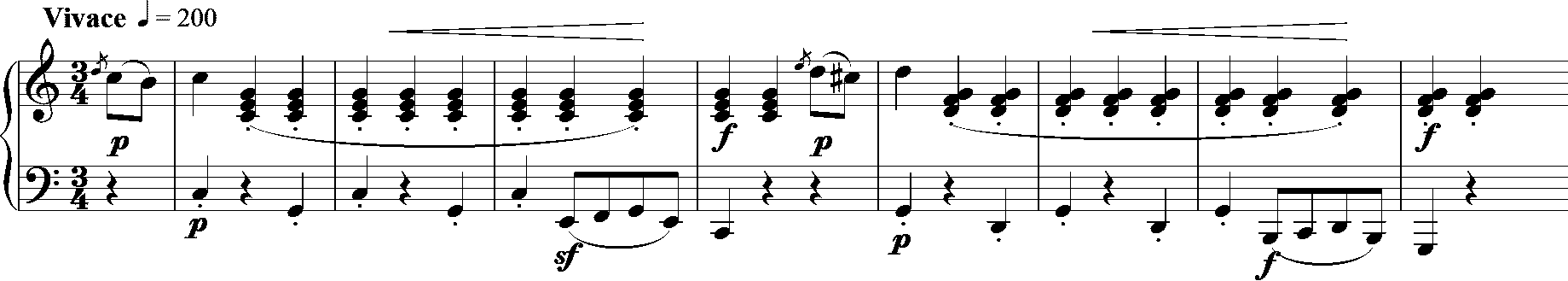
Theme by Anton Diabelli

Beethoven contributed a mighty set of 33 variations on this theme. The thirteenth of these stands out in its seemingly wilful eccentricity and determination to reduce the given material to its bare bones:

Beethoven, Diabelli Variation No. 13

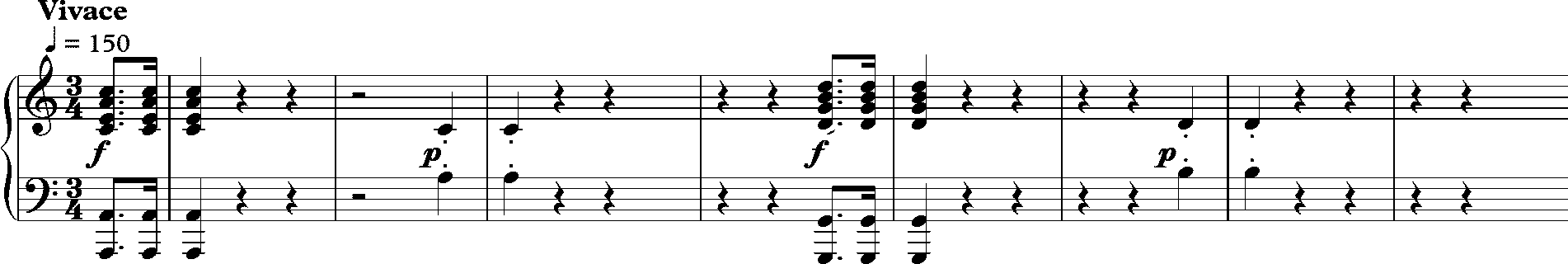
Beethoven, Diabelli Variation No. 13

Wilfrid Mellers describes this variation as "comically disruptive... The original tonal sequence is telescoped, the two-bar sequences being absorbed into the silences."

In a similar fashion, the first of the 24 variations of Rachmaninoff's Rhapsody on a Theme of Paganini for piano and orchestra presents a terse summary of Paganini's original:

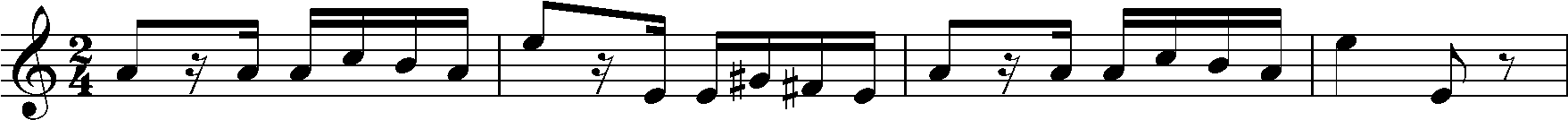
Paganini Caprice for Violin, Op. 24, bars 1-4

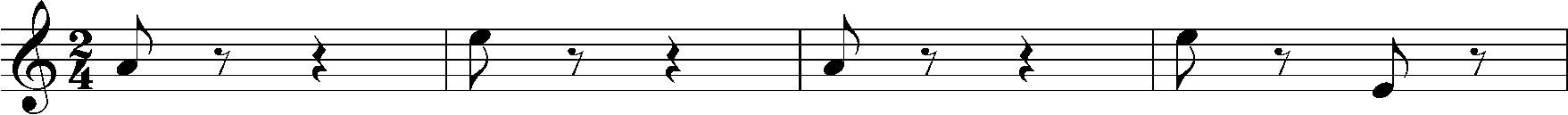
Rachmaninoff, Rhapsody on a theme of Paganini, Variation 1, bars 1-4

=== Variations on material originally by other composers ===
Many composers have taken pieces composed by others as a basis for elaboration. John Dowland's "Lachrimae" was frequently used by other composers as a basis for sets of variations during the 17th century. Composed in 1700, the final movement of Arcangelo Corelli's Violin Sonata Op. 5, No. 9, opens with this rather sparse melodic line:

Corelli, Violin Sonata Op. 5, No. 9

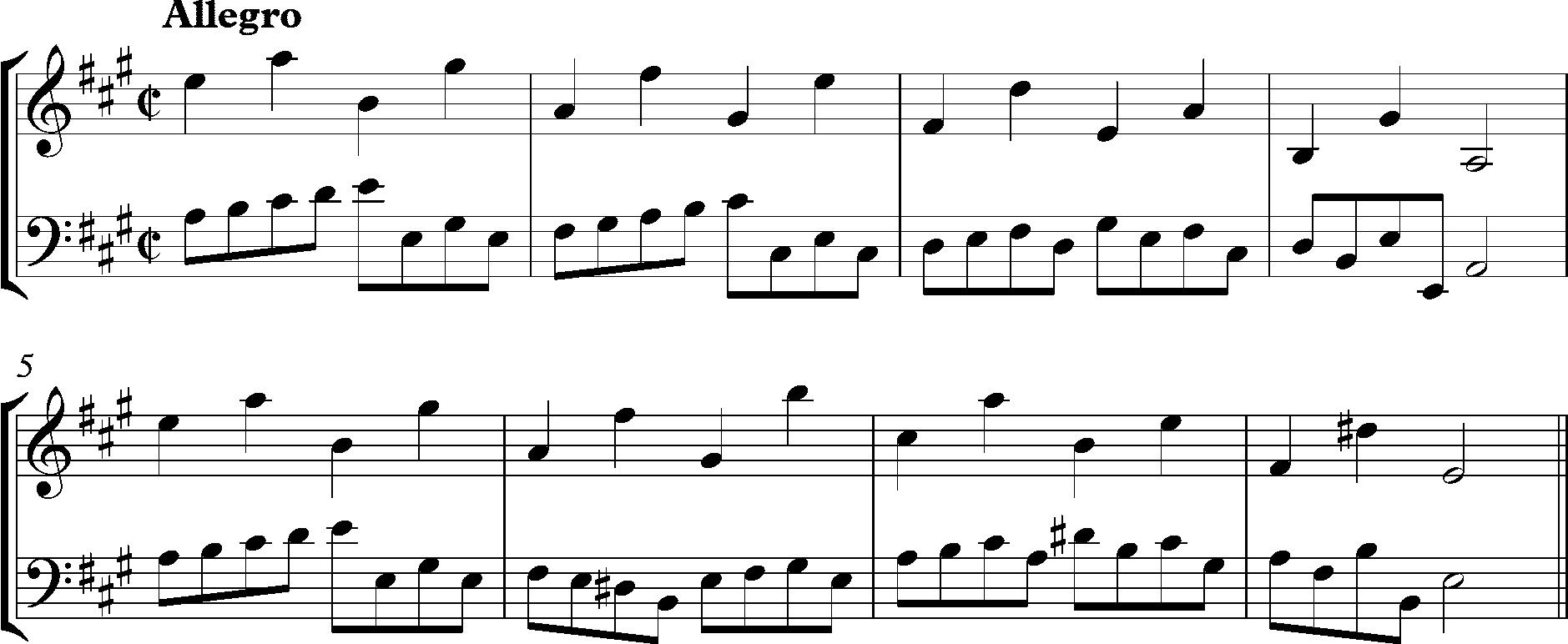
Corelli, Violin Sonata Op. 5, No. 9

Corelli's fellow-composer and former student Francesco Geminiani produced a "playing version" as follows:

Corelli, Violin Sonata Op. 5, No. 9, performing version by Geminiani

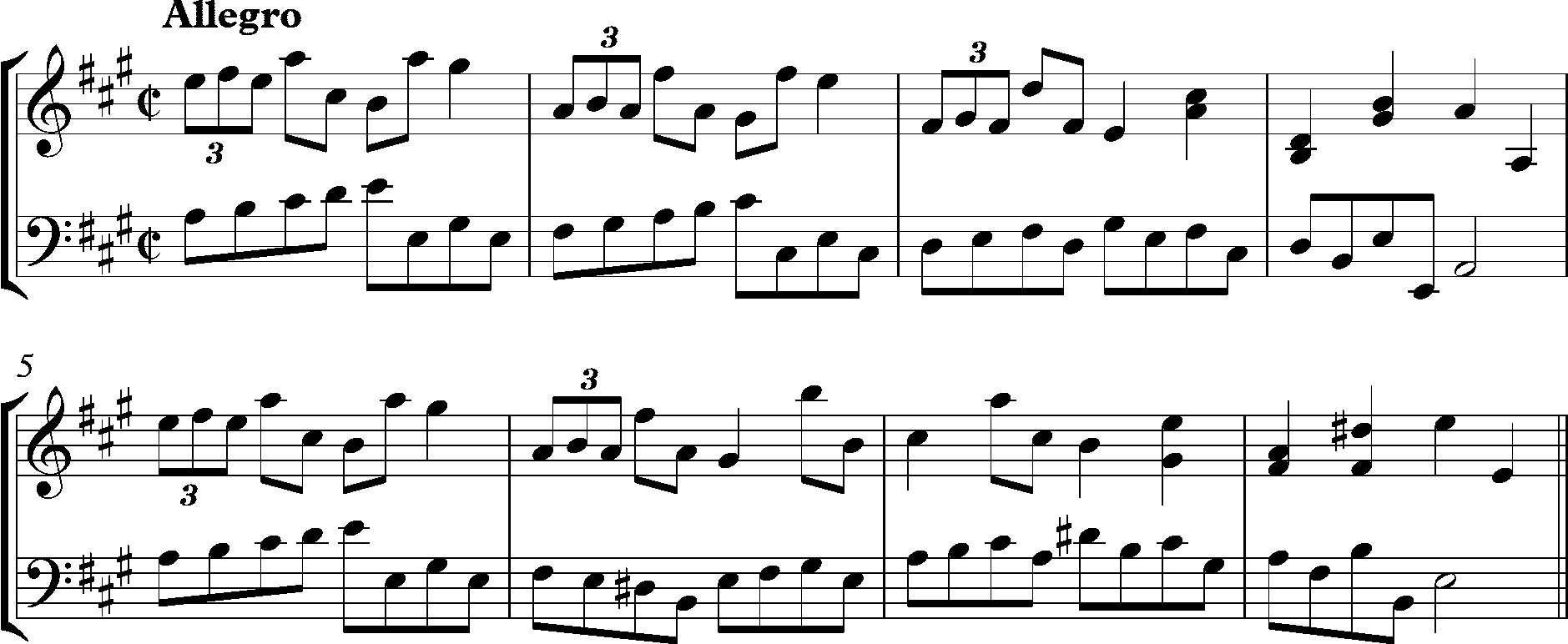
Corelli, Violin Sonata Op. 5, No. 9, performing version by Geminiani

According to Nicholas Cook, in Geminiani's version "all the notes of Corelli's violin line ... are absorbed into a quite new melodic organization. With its characteristic rhythmic pattern, Geminiani's opening is a tune in a way that Corelli's is not... whereas in the original version the first four bars consist of an undifferentiated stream of quarter-notes and make up a single phrase, Geminiani's version has three sequential repetitions of a distinctive one-bar phrase and a contrasted closing phrase, producing a strongly accented down-beat quality."

Jazz arrangers frequently develop variations on themes by other composers. For example, Gil Evans' 1959 arrangement of George Gershwin's song "Summertime" from the opera Porgy and Bess is an example of variation through changing orchestral timbre. At the outset, Evans presents a single variation that repeats five times in subtly differing instrumental combinations. These create a compelling background, a constantly-changing sonic tapestry over which trumpeter Miles Davis freely improvises his own set of variations. Wilfrid Mellers (1964) wrote that "[i]t called for an improviser of Davis's kind and quality to explore, through Gil Evans' arrangement, the tender frailty inherent in the 'Summer-time' tune... Between them, solo line and harmonic colour create a music that is at once innocent and tense with apprehension".

== Variation form ==
Variation forms include ground bass, passacaglia, chaconne, and theme-and-variations. Ground bass, passacaglia and chaconne are typically based on brief ostinato motifs providing a repetitive harmonic basis and are also typically continuous evolving structures. Theme-and-variation forms are, however, based specifically on melodic variation, in which the fundamental musical idea, or theme, is repeated in altered form or accompanied in a different manner. Theme-and-variation structure generally begins with a theme (which is itself sometimes preceded by an introduction), typically between eight and thirty-two bars in length; each variation, particularly in music of the eighteenth century and earlier, will be of the same length and structure as the theme. This form may in part have derived from the practical inventiveness of musicians; "Court dances were long; the tunes which accompanied them were short. Their repetition became intolerably wearisome, and inevitably led the player to indulge in extempore variation and ornament"; however, the format of the dance required these variations to maintain the same duration and shape of the tune.

Variation forms can be written as free-standing pieces for solo instruments or ensembles, or can constitute a movement of a larger piece. Most jazz music is structured on a basic pattern of theme and variations.

Examples include John Bull's Salvator Mundi, Bach's Canonic Variations on "Vom Himmel hoch da komm' ich her, Passacaglia and Fugue in C minor, Violin Chaconne, and (D minor solo violin suite), Corelli's La Folia Variations, Beethoven's Diabelli Variations, the Finales of his Third "Eroica" and Ninth "Choral" Symphonies, the Finale of Brahms's Fourth Symphony, Variations on a Theme of Haydn, Op. 56, Elgar's Enigma Variations, Franck's Variations Symphoniques, and Richard Strauss's Don Quixote. Both Schubert's Death and the Maiden Quartet and Trout Quintet take their titles from his songs used as variation movements.

Chopin's Berceuse for piano, Op. 57, was first called Variantes, and consists of 16 continuous variations on a ground bass.

== History of variations ==
=== Renaissance and Baroque periods ===
Although the first isolated example emerged in the 14th century, works in theme-and-variation form first emerge in the early sixteenth century. Possibly the earliest published example is the diferencias for vihuela by Luis de Narváez (1538). A favorite form of variations in Renaissance music was divisions, a type in which the basic rhythmic beat is successively divided into smaller and smaller values. The basic principle of beginning with simple variations and moving on to more elaborate ones has always been present in the history of the variation form, since it provides a way of giving an overall shape to a variation set, rather than letting it just form an arbitrary sequence.

Keyboard works in variation form were written by a number of 16th-century English composers, including William Byrd, Hugh Aston and Giles Farnaby. Outstanding examples of early Baroque variations are the "ciaccone" of Claudio Monteverdi and Heinrich Schütz. Two famous variation sets from the Baroque era, both originally written for harpsichord, are George Frideric Handel's The Harmonious Blacksmith, and Johann Sebastian Bach's Goldberg Variations, BWV 988.

=== Classical and Early Romantic periods ===
In the Classical era, Wolfgang Amadeus Mozart wrote a great number of variations, such as the first movement of his Piano Sonata in A, K. 331 (1783), and the finale of his Clarinet Quintet, K. 581 (1789). Joseph Haydn specialized in sets of double variations, in which two related themes, usually minor and major, are presented and then varied in alternation; outstanding examples include the slow movement of his Symphony No. 103 (the Drumroll, 1794–5), and the Variations in F minor for piano, H XVII:6 (1793).

As the Classical transitioned towards the Romantic era, the variation form began to reach monumental scales. Anton Reicha's L'art de varier for solo piano, Op. 57 (1803–04), consists of 57 variations ranging from very easy to extremely virtuosic pieces. Ludwig van Beethoven also wrote many variation sets in his career, including the independent sets, the Eroica Variations, Op. 35 (1802) and the Diabelli Variations, Op. 120 (1819–23). Others form single movements or parts of movements in larger works, such as first movement of the Piano Sonata No. 12, Op. 26 (1800–1), or the variations in the final movement of the Third Symphony "Eroica" (1803/1805). The variation form also occur in several of his late works, such as the slow movement of his String Quartet No. 12, Op. 127 (1825), the second movement of his final Piano Sonata No. 32, Op. 111 (1822), and the slow third movement of the Ninth Symphony, Op.125 (1824).

Franz Schubert wrote five sets of variations using his own lieder as themes, taking their namesake as epithets. For example, the second movement Andante of his fourteenth string quartet Death and the Maiden, D. 810 (1824), consists of an intense set of variations on his somber lied of the same title (D. 531, 1817). Similarly, his Piano Quintet in A major ("Trout Quintet", D. 667, 1819) includes a set of variations on The Trout (D. 550, 1817), and the second movement of the Fantasy in C major for solo piano ("Wanderer Fantasy", D. 760, 1822) is based on The Wanderer (D. 489, 1816).

=== Romantic period ===
As the Romantic era proceeded, the theme-and-variations form developed into a demonstration of compositional and virtuosic technique, particularly that of pianists. In 1824, Carl Czerny premiered his Variations for piano and orchestra on the Austrian National Hymn Gott erhalte Franz der Kaiser, Op. 73. Frédéric Chopin wrote many variations for solo pianists, notably his Variations on "La ci darem la mano" for piano and orchestra on an aria from Mozart's Don Giovanni, Op. 2 (1827). Another example is Felix Mendelssohn's virtuousic Variations sérieuses for solo piano, Op. 54 (1841). Charles-Valentin Alkan wrote many sets of variations in his works, notably using the form in Le Festin d'Ésope to cap off his 12 Études dans tous les tons mineurs for solo piano, Op. 39 (1857). Johannes Brahms' Variations and Fugue on a Theme by Handel, Op. 24 (1861), and Variations on a Theme of Paganini, Op. 35 (1863), are notable for their large scale and high level of difficulty. Richard Wagner, a radical compared to Brahms' conservative style, remarked after hearing Op. 24 that "One sees what still may be done in the old forms when someone comes along who knows how to use them".

The late Romantic period also saw the rise of variations written for orchestral forces. Brahms' Variations on a Theme by Haydn for orchestra (1873) is believed to be the first set of variations composed for orchestra without a soloist, that did not form part of a symphony, suite or other larger work. Other notable orchestral variations of the late Romantic include the first movement of Karl Goldmark's Rustic Wedding Symphony (1875), Antonín Dvořák's Symphonic Variations (1877), Anton Arensky's Variations on a Theme by Tchaikovsky for string orchestra, Op. 35a (1894), Richard Strauss' symphonic tone poem Don Quixote (subtitled Fantastic Variations on a Theme of Knightly Character, 1897), Edward Elgar's Enigma Variations (1899), and Max Reger's Variations and Fugue on a Theme by Bach, Op.81 (1904) and Variations and Fugue on a Theme by Mozart, Op. 132 (1914).

=== In the 20th and 21st centuries ===
Variation sets composed by notable twentieth-century composers include:

- Charles Ives (Variations on "America" for organ, 1891),
- Cécile Chaminade (Thème varié for solo piano, Op. 89, 1898),
- Sergei Rachmaninoff (Variations on a Theme of Chopin for solo piano, Op. 22, 1902–1903; Variations on a Theme of Corelli for solo piano, Op. 42, 1931; Rhapsody on a Theme of Paganini for piano and orchestra, Op. 43, 1934),
- Ernst von Dohnányi (Variations on a Nursery Tune for piano and orchestra, Op. 25, 1914),
- Igor Stravinsky (Pulcinella, 1920: XV Gavotta con due variazioni; Octet, 1923: II Tema con variazioni; Ebony Concerto, 1945: III Moderato; Variations: Aldous Huxley in memoriam, 1963–64),
- Dmitri Shostakovich (Theme and Variations for Orchestra, Op. 3, 1922),
- Alban Berg (Wozzeck, 1922: Act 1 Scene 4, beginning of Act 3 Scene 1; Lulu, 1937: Act 3 Interlude),
- Arnold Schoenberg (Variations for Orchestra, Op. 31, 1926–28; Theme and Variations for band or orchestra, Opp. 43a, b, 1943),
- Aaron Copland (Piano Variations, 1930, transcribed into Orchestral Variations, 1957),
- Olivier Messiaen (Thème et variations for violin and piano, 1932),
- Nikolai Medtner (Theme with Variations for solo piano, Op. 55, 1933),
- Miklós Rózsa (Theme, Variations, and Finale for orchestra, Op. 13, 1933),
- George Gershwin (Variations on "I Got Rhythm" for piano and orchestra, 1934),
- Anton Webern (Variations for piano, Op. 27, 1936; Variations for orchestra, Op. 30, 1940),
- Reinhold Glière (Harp Concerto, 1938: II Tema con variazioni),
- Sergei Prokofiev (Cello Concerto, Op. 58, 1938: III; Sinfonia Concertante, Op. 125, 1952),
- Paul Hindemith (Symphonic Metamorphosis of Themes by Carl Maria von Weber, 1943),
- Benjamin Britten (Variations on a Theme of Frank Bridge, 1937; The Young Person's Guide to the Orchestra: Variations and Fugue on a Theme by Purcell, 1946),
- William Walton (Sonata for Violin and Piano, 1947–49: II; Variations on a Theme by Hindemith, 1963),
- Kaikhosru Shapurji Sorabji (numerous large scale compositions for piano with and without orchestra, including the Sequentia cyclica super "Dies irae" ex Missa pro defunctis for solo piano, KSS71, 1948–49),
- Leonard Bernstein (Symphony No. 2: The Age of Anxiety, 1949: Part One),
- Luigi Nono (Variazioni canoniche sulla serie dell'op. 41 di A. Schönberg, 1950),
- Francis Poulenc (Thème varié for solo piano, FP 151, 1951)
- Federico Mompou (Variations on a Theme of Chopin for solo piano, 1957),
- Ben Johnston (String Quartets No. 1 "Nine Variations", 1957; No. 4 "The Ascent: 'Amazing Grace'", 1973; No. 7: III. Variations. With Solemnity, 1984),
- Margaret Bonds (Montgomery Variations for orchestra, based on the spiritual "I Want Jesus to Walk with Me", 1964)
- John Cage (Variations, 1958–67; Hymns and Variations for twelve amplified voices, 1979),
- Ned Rorem (Air Music for orchestra, 1974; Six Variations for two pianos, 1995)
- Frederic Rzewski (The People United Will Never Be Defeated! for solo piano, based on Sergio Ortega Alvarado's El pueblo unido jamás será vencido, 1975),
- Frans Geysen (De grote variatie for organ, 1975),
- Cristóbal Halffter (Variaciones sobre la resonancia de un grito for 11 instruments, tape, and live electronics, 1976–77),
- Andrew Lloyd Webber (Variations for cello and rock band, 1977),
- Germaine Tailleferre (Choral et deux variations, for two pianos, or wood quintet, 1979),
- Steve Reich (Variations for Winds, Strings and Keyboards, 1979),
- John McGuire (Forty-eight Variations for two pianos, 1976–80),
- John Williams (Variations on "Happy Birthday" for orchestra, 1995),
- Graham Waterhouse (Gestural Variations for oboe, bassoon and piano, 1997; Variations for Cello Solo, 2019), and
- Helmut Lachenmann (Sakura-Variationen for saxophone, piano and percussion, 2000)

=== Variations written by multiple people ===
There is also a tradition stemming from the Romantic era of multiple composers writing variations collaboratively on a single theme. Some are strictly in the form of theme and variations, while 'homages' consist of loosely connected pieces based on a series of notes spelled from the name of the dedicatee (B-A-C-H, or H-A-Y-D-N). These include:

- Vaterländischer Kunstlerverein (1819–24): a set of variations on a theme by Anton Diabelli, with contribution from 51 composers invited by Diabelli who were living in or were associated with Austria, including: Ludwig van Beethoven (whose 33 variations were eventually published separately as his Diabelli Variations), Carl Czerny (who wrote the coda), Franz Schubert, Johann Nepomuk Hummel, Ignaz Moscheles, Friedrich Kalkbrenner, and an 11-year-old Franz Liszt,
- Hexaméron (1839), a set of variations on a theme from Vincenzo Bellini's I Puritani, by Franz Liszt, Sigismund Thalberg, Johann Peter Pixis, Henri Herz, Carl Czerny and Frédéric Chopin,
- Paraphrases (1874–80) for solo piano*, anecdotally based on a theme by Alexander Borodin's daughter Galina but popularly known as Chopsticks, with contributions from César Cui, Anatoly Lyadov, Nikolai Rimsky-Korsakov, Nikolai Shcherbachov and Franz Liszt, including a set of 24 Variations by Cui, Rimsky-Korsakov and Lyadov, (*The recurring theme is played by another hand, as a thème obligé or cantus firmus; Rimsky-Korsakov's Carillon movement is written for four hands, in addition to the thème obligé)
- Hommage à Joseph Haydn (1909–10) for solo piano, a suite of individual pieces based on the notes B-A-D-D-G (derived from Haydn's name), with contributions from Claude Debussy, Maurice Ravel, Vincent d'Indy, Paul Dukas, Charles-Marie Widor, and Reynaldo Hahn, marking the centenary of the composer's death,
- Variations on "Cadet Rousselle" (1918), a popular French song, for voice and piano, by Arnold Bax, Frank Bridge, Eugene Goossens and John Ireland, later arranged by Goossens for small orchestra and published as his Op. 40 (1930),
- Hommage à Gabriel Fauré (1922), a suite composed mostly for solo piano on a theme derived from his name ('Fauré': F-A-G-D-E, some including 'Gabriel': G-A-B-D-B-E-E) by seven of Fauré's students: Maurice Ravel, George Enescu, Louis Aubert, Florent Schmitt, Charles Koechlin, Paul Ladmiraut, and Jean Roger-Ducasse,
- La guirlande de Campra for orchestra (1952), on a theme from André Campra's Camille, reine des Volsques, by Arthur Honegger, Daniel Lesur, Alexis Roland-Manuel, Germaine Tailleferre, Francis Poulenc, Henri Sauguet, and Georges Auric,
- Variations on an Elizabethan Theme for string orchestra (1952) based an Irish dance tune (harmonized by William Byrd), by Benjamin Britten, Lennox Berkeley, Arthur Oldham, Humphrey Searle, Michael Tippett, William Walton, and orchestrated by Imogen Holst,
- Variations sur le nom de Marguerite Long (1956) for orchestra, technically a suite including such movements as Jean Françaix's Hymne solennel and Francis Poulenc's Bucolique (FP 160), though Henri Sauguet's movement Variations en forme de Berceuse pour Marguerite Long is a set of variations based on the notes E-A-G-G derived from Marguerite Long's name, and
- Variations on a Theme by Glinka (1957) for solo piano, on a theme from Mikhail Glinka's A Life for the Tsar, by Eugen Kapp, Vissarion Shebalin, Andrei Eshpai, Rodion Shchedrin, Georgy Sviridov, Yuri Levitin, Dmitri Shostakovich and Dmitry Kabalevsky,
- Variations on a Theme of Zoltán Kodály (1962) for orchestra, on a theme from his first string quartet, Op. 2, on the occasion of his 80th birthday, by several of his composition pupils, Antal Doráti, Tibor Serly, Ödön Pártos, Géza Frid and Sándor Veress, and
- Severn Bridge Variations (1966) for orchestra, on the Welsh hymn tune Braint, composed for the occasion of the opening of the Severn Bridge spanning England and Wales by Malcolm Arnold, Alun Hoddinott, Daniel Jones, Nicholas Maw, Michael Tippett and Grace Williams.

=== Variations on a theme by another composer ===
Since the Classical period, composers have written theme-and-variation sets based on tunes or themes familiar to the public, a noted example being Mozart's 12 variations on the tune "Ah, vous dirai-je, Maman", K. 265/300e (1788). Beethoven also based variations on material not his own, including operatic arias, such as Mozart's The Magic Flute (his Op. 66 and WoO 46), and folk tunes, in his National Airs with Variations (Op. 105 and Op. 107) for flute (or violin) and piano.

The variation form was sometimes used as a means of personal deference. One notable example is Clara Schumann's 16 Variations on a Theme by Robert Schumann, Op. 20 (1853), written for the occasion of her husband's birthday, the last that he would spend with his family. The theme is derived from the fourth movement of his Bunte Blätter, Op. 99. Inspired by this, Johannes Brahms composed his own Variations on a Theme by Robert Schumann, Op. 9 (1854) on the same theme.

== Contemporary popular and electronic music ==
Variation techniques are also characteristic of many forms of contemporary popular and electronic music, particularly genres based on short repeating motifs rather than extended thematic materials. In styles such as house, techno, garage, grime and dubstep, producers frequently employ iterative modifications to a basic riff or pattern in order to maintain listener engagement and create a sense of development within a loop-based framework.

Whereas classical theme-and-variations typically presents an identifiable theme of multiple bars followed by contrasting reworkings, variation in electronic dance music is often carried out on smaller musical units, sometimes consisting of only a few notes or a single timbral gesture. Alterations may involve changes to rhythm, pitch, timbre, density, register or articulation. For example, a repeated synthesizer phrase may be rearticulated using staccato figures, triplet subdivisions or syncopated omissions; its pitch contour may be raised or lowered to vary intensity; or its sonic character may be transformed through filtering, modulation or distortion. These techniques serve a similar structural function to classical variation by balancing repetition with novelty.

In many electronic genres, timbre plays a primary structural role, with distinctive sound design forming part of the identity of the motif itself. This contrasts with earlier variation traditions, where melodic and harmonic reworking predominated and orchestration was typically secondary. The use of variation across short time-scales in electronics- and sampler-based music has been compared by musicologists to classical concepts such as fragmentation, diminution and textural variation.

Loop-based structures such as riff, ostinato and breakbeat have been identified as modern counterparts to earlier repeating figures in classical music traditions. In electronic dance music, variation commonly operates on these short units, while larger formal sections (e.g., "drops", "breakdowns" and "build-ups") mediate long-range energy curves in a manner distinct from classical variation form.

== Improvised variations ==
Skilled musicians can often improvise variations on a theme. This was commonplace in the Baroque era, when the da capo aria, particularly when in slow tempo, required the singer to be able to improvise a variation during the return of the main material. During this period, according to Nicholas Cook, it was often the case that "responsibility for the most highly elaborated stage in the compositional process fell not upon the composer but upon the executant. In their instrumental sonatas composers like Corelli, Geminiani, and Handel sometimes supplied the performer with only the skeleton of the music that was to be played; the ornamentation, which contributes crucially to the music's effect, had to be provided by the performer." Cook cites Geminiani's elaboration of Corelli (see above) as an example of an instance "in which the composer, or a performer, wrote down a version of one of these movements as it was meant to be played."

Musicians of the Classical era also could improvise variations; both Mozart (see Mozart's compositional method) and Beethoven made powerful impressions on their audiences when they improvised. Modern listeners can get a sense of what these improvised variations sounded like by listening to published works that evidently are written transcriptions of improvised performances, in particular Beethoven's Fantasia in G minor, Op. 77, and Mozart's Variations on an Aria by Gluck, K. 455.

Improvisation of elaborate variations on a popular theme is one of the core genres of jazz. According to William Austin, the practice of jazz musicians "resembles the variations on popular songs composed for the keyboard at the end of the 16th century by Byrd, Bull, Sweelinck and Frescobaldi, more than the cumulative variations of Beethoven and Brahms." Generally, the theme used is stated quite explicitly at the outset. However, some jazz musicians employ a more oblique approach. According to Gamble, "Charlie Parker's performance of Embraceable You can be appreciated fully only if we are familiar with the tune, for unlike many jazz performances in which the theme is stated at the beginning, followed by improvisations on the theme, Parker launches almost immediately into improvisation, stating only a fragment of the tune at the end of the piece." Coleman Hawkins' famous interpretation of "Body and Soul" shows a similar approach. "On 11 October 1939, Coleman Hawkins went into New York's RCA studios with an eight-piece band to record the 1930 composition Body and Soul. It was already a favourite among jazz musicians, but nobody had ever played it like this. Pianist Gene Rodgers plays a straight four-bar introduction before Hawkins swoops in, soloing for three minutes without playing a single note of the tune, gliding over the chord changes with such harmonic logic that he ends up inventing bebop."

Improvisation by means of spontaneous variations, ornaments, embellishments and/or alterations to a melody is the basis of most sub-Saharan African music (traditional and pop) extending from melody and harmony to form and rhythmic embellishments.

== See also ==
- Composer tributes (classical music)
- Developing variation
- Inversion
- Matrix (music)
- Strophic form
- Traditional sub-Saharan African harmony
- Tune-family

== Notes ==
=== References ===
- Apel, Willi (1962), Harvard dictionary of music
- Austin, William (1966), Music in the 20th Century, London: Dent
- Biba, Otto, American Symphony Orchestra: Dialogues and Extensions, archived from the original on 5 March 2009
- Braunbehrens, Volkmar (1990), Mozart in Vienna, New York: Grove Weidenfeld, ISBN 0-8021-1009-6
- Cook, N (1990), Music, Imagination and Culture, Oxford: Clarendon Press
- Copland, Aaron (2002), What to Listen for in Music, Revised edition of an authorized reprint of a hardcover edition published by McGraw-Hill Book Company, New York: Signet Classic, ISBN 0-451-52867-0
- Drebes, Gerald (1992), "Schütz, Monteverdi und die "Vollkommenheit der Musik" – "Es steh Gott auf" aus den "Symphoniae sacrae" II (1647)", Schütz-Jahrbuch, 14: 25–55, doi:10.13141/sjb.v1992774, archived from the original on 3 March 2016
- Gamble, T. (1984), "Imagination and Understanding in the Music Curriculum", British Journal of Music Education, 1 (1), Cambridge University Press, doi:10.1017/S0265051700004101
- Hodeir, André (2006), Pautrot, Jean-Louis (ed.), The André Hodeir Jazz Reader, Ann Arbor: University of Michigan Press, ISBN 978-0-472-09883-5
- Irmer, Otto von (1975), "Vorwort", Beethoven: Klavierstücke (in German, English, and French), Munich: G. Henle, ISMN 979-0-2018-0012-7, HN 12
- Lewis, J. (17 June 2011), "Coleman Hawkins records Body and Soul: Number 14 in our series of the 50 key events in the history of jazz music", The Guardian
- McCorkle, Donald M. (1976), Variationen über ein Thema von Joseph Haydn (Norton Scores ed.), ISBN 9780393021899
- Mellers, Wilfrid (1964), Music in a New Found Land: Themes and Developments in the History of American Music, London: Barrie and Rockliff
- Mellers, Wilfrid (1983), Beethoven and the Voice of God, London: Faber
- Raymar, Aubyn (1931), "Preface", in Bowen, York (ed.), Mozart: Miscellaneous Pieces for Pianforte, London: Associated Board of the Royal Schools of Music (ABRSM)
- Sisman, Elaine (2001), "Variations", in Sadie, Stanley; Tyrrell, John (eds.), The New Grove Dictionary of Music and Musicians (2nd ed.), London: Macmillan Publishers
- Wennerstrom, Mary (1975), "1. Form in Twentieth-Century Music", in Wittlich, Gary (ed.), Aspects of Twentieth-Century Music, Englewood Cliffs, New Jersey: Prentice-Hall, ISBN 0-13-049346-5
- White, John David (1976), The Analysis of Music, Englewood Cliffs, New Jersey: Prentice-Hall, ISBN 0-13-033233-X
