= Classical music written in collaboration =

In classical music, it is relatively rare for a work to be written in collaboration by multiple composers. This contrasts with popular music, where it is common for more than one person to contribute to the music for a song. Nevertheless, there are instances of collaborative classical music compositions.

== Collaborations ==
The following list gives some details of classical works written by composers working collaboratively.

=== Opera and operetta ===
- In 1656, The Siege of Rhodes was written in London, and is considered to be the first English opera. The vocal music is by Henry Lawes, Matthew Locke, and Captain Henry Cooke, and the instrumental music is by Charles Coleman and George Hudson.
- In 1721, Filippo Amadei, Giovanni Bononcini and George Frideric Handel each wrote one act of the opera Muzio Scevola.
- Also in 1721, Michel Richard Delalande and André Cardinal Destouches jointly composed the opera-ballet Les élémens.
- Between the 1720s and the 1760s, François Francoeur and François Rebel collaborated on a number of operas.
- In 1767, Wolfgang Amadeus Mozart, Michael Haydn and Anton Cajetan Adlgasser each wrote one act of Die Schuldigkeit des ersten Gebots. Only Mozart's music has survived.
- Luigi Ricci and his younger brother Federico wrote a number of operas together, including Crispino e la comare (1850).
- In 1861, the operetta Les musiciens de l'orchestre was written by Léo Delibes, Erlanger, Aristide Hignard and Jacques Offenbach.
- Malbrough s'en va-t-en guerre was an operetta produced in Paris in December 1867. One act each was written by Georges Bizet, Léo Delibes, Émile Jonas and Isidore Legouix.
- Mlada (1872) is an opera-ballet by Alexander Borodin, César Cui, Ludwig Minkus, Modest Mussorgsky and Nikolai Rimsky-Korsakov. It was never staged, and much of the music is lost or known only in later versions. The only extant part of the original score is Act I, by Cui and Minkus.
- Federico Chueca and Joaquín Valverde Durán collaborated on a number of zarzuelas. Chueca provided most of the melodies and Valverde provided the orchestral polish. Their collaborations included Un maestro de obra prima (1877), La Canción de la Lola (1880), Luces y sombras and Fiesta Nacional (both 1882), Cádiz (1886), El año pasado por agua (1889), and other operas. Their masterpiece was La gran vía (Madrid, 1886). Valverde Durán also collaborated with Ruperto Chapí, Tomás Bretón, his own son Joaquín "Quinito" Valverde Sanjuán, and other composers. Quinito Valverde Sanjuán also collaborated with other composers, such as Tomás López Torregrosa, Ramón Estellés, Rafael Calleja and José Serrano, however, his contribution to these works was more significant than his father's had been to his.
- Other zarzuela composers collaborated in some important works: Amadeu Vives with Gerónimo Giménez in El húsar de la guardia (1904), La gatita blanca (1905) and other; Giménez with Manuel Nieto in El barbero de Sevilla (1901) and with Ruperto Chapí in La eterna revista (1908); Pablo Luna with Tomás Barrera or Rafael Calleja; etc.
- in 1913, Maurice Ravel and Igor Stravinsky together wrote a completion of Mussorgsky's opera Khovanshchina for a production by Sergei Diaghilev. Stravinsky's ending is sometimes still heard, but this joint realisation is otherwise unknown.
- From 1919 to 1930, Juan Vert and Reveriano Soutullo collaborated on 21 zarzuelas, both providing music. These collaborations include some of the most known instances of the genre: La del soto del Parral (1927), La leyenda del beso (1924) or El último romántico (1927).
- In 1921, Alberto Franchetti and Umberto Giordano jointly wrote the opera Giove a Pompei.
- In 1929, Paul Hindemith and Kurt Weill collaborated on the opera Der Lindberghflug (Lindbergh's Flight), based on the writing of American pioneer aviator Charles Lindbergh. This was later changed by removal of Hindemith’s contribution, renaming it to Der Ozeanflug (The Flight across the Ocean), and removal of Lindbergh’s name. The opening line was changed from "My name is Charles Lindbergh" to "My name is of no account".
- In 1937, Arthur Honegger and Jacques Ibert wrote the opera L'Aiglon. Ibert wrote Acts 1 and 5, Honegger the rest. In 1938, they again collaborated on an opera, this time Les petites cardinal.
- In 2000, the opera The Age of Dreams was written by three Finnish composers: Kalevi Aho, Olli Kortekangas and Herman Rechberger. It was premiered at the Savonlinna Opera Festival that year.
- In 2016, the hypnotic opera Indigo was written by two Finnish composers: Eicca Toppinen and Perttu Kivilaakso.

=== Ballet ===
- La source (1866) is a ballet with music by Léo Delibes and Ludwig Minkus. Minkus wrote Act I and Scene 2 of Act III; Delibes wrote Act II and Scene 1 of Act III.
- In 1909, Sergei Diaghilev commissioned orchestrations of some pieces by Frédéric Chopin for the ballet Les Sylphides, by Alexander Glazunov, Anatoly Lyadov, Sergei Taneyev, Nikolai Tcherepnin and Igor Stravinsky.
- In 1910, Robert Schumann's Carnaval, Op. 9, was choreographed for a ballet for a production by Diaghilev, with orchestrations by Nikolai Rimsky-Korsakov, Alexander Tcherepnin, Glazunov and Lyadov.
- In 1921, Georges Auric, Arthur Honegger, Darius Milhaud, Francis Poulenc and Germaine Tailleferre (all members of Les Six; the remaining member Louis Durey was unavailable) collectively wrote a ballet to Jean Cocteau's Les mariés de la tour Eiffel
- L'éventail de Jeanne (1927) is a ballet written by ten French composers: Georges Auric, Marcel Delannoy, Pierre-Octave Ferroud, Jacques Ibert, Darius Milhaud, Francis Poulenc, Maurice Ravel, Alexis Roland-Manuel, Albert Roussel, and Florent Schmitt.
- In 1956 appeared Don Perlimplin (also seen as Perlimplinada), a collaboration between Federico Mompou and Xavier Montsalvatge. Most of the work was by Mompou, but Montsalvatge helped with the orchestration and linking passages, and added two numbers of his own.

=== Orchestral ===
- Six of Franz Liszt's Hungarian Rhapsodies for piano solo (including the best known, No. 2) were orchestrated by his pupil Franz Doppler, with later minor touches by Liszt himself.
- Johann Strauss II collaborated on a number of pieces with his brothers Josef and Eduard, mostly famously Pizzicato Polka (1870) with Josef.
- In 1904, Nikolai Artsybushev, Alexander Glazunov, Anatoly Lyadov, Nikolai Rimsky-Korsakov, Nikolai Sokolov and Joseph Wihtol wrote Variations on a Russian Theme.
- In 1918, the Variations on "Cadet Rousselle" were written as an encore piece for voice and piano by Arnold Bax, Frank Bridge, Eugene Goossens and John Ireland. In 1930 Goossens arranged this composite work for small orchestra, publishing it as his Op. 40. It is much better known in its orchestral form.
- Captions: Five Glimpses of an Anonymous Theme, published in 1923, is a suite of movements by Herbert Bedford, Arthur Bliss, Eugene Goossens, Felix Harold White and Gerrard Williams.
- In 1937, shortly after they first met at the ISCM Festival in Barcelona, Benjamin Britten and Lennox Berkeley together wrote Mont Juic, a suite of Catalan dances. It was named after the Barcelona hill on which they had heard some popular tunes. For many years, it was not known which composer wrote which movement, but Berkeley later revealed he had written only the first two movements. It was published as Berkeley's Op. 9 and Britten's Op. 12.
- In 1945 appeared Variations on a Theme by Eugene Goossens. The variations were by Ernest Bloch, Aaron Copland, Paul Creston, Anis Fuleihan, Howard Hanson, Roy Harris, Walter Piston, Bernard Rogers and Deems Taylor, with Goossens himself writing the finale. The work was premiered on 23 March 1945 by the Cincinnati Symphony Orchestra conducted by Goossens.
- In 1952 came the premiere of La guirlande de Campra, a set of orchestral variations on a theme from André Campra's 1717 opera Camille, reine des Volsques. The composers were Georges Auric, Jean-Yves Daniel-Lesur, Arthur Honegger, Francis Poulenc, Alexis Roland-Manuel, Henri Sauguet and Germaine Tailleferre. In 1966 it was choreographed as a ballet.
- In 1953, Lennox Berkeley, Benjamin Britten, Arthur Oldham, Humphrey Searle, Michael Tippett, and William Walton jointly wrote Variations on an Elizabethan Theme. The theme (Sellinger's Round) was arranged by Imogen Holst from a keyboard harmonisation by William Byrd. Each of the composers also quoted briefly from one of their own earlier compositions. At the first two performances, the audience was not told which composer had written which variation, but were invited to take part in a competition to match the variations to the composers, to raise funds for the Aldeburgh Festival. Nobody correctly guessed all six composers.
- In 1956, in honour of the pianist Marguerite Long, eight French composers wrote Variations sur le nom de Marguerite Long (although only one of the eight sections was actually a set of variations).
- Variations on a Theme of Zoltán Kodály, a 1962 orchestral work, was written by Antal Doráti, Tibor Serly, Ödön Pártos, Géza Frid and Sándor Veress, Kodály's composition pupils, for his 80th birthday celebration. The theme is taken from Kodály's String Quartet No. 1, Op. 2. The score is published by Boosey & Hawkes.
- in 1966, Severn Bridge Variations was jointly composed by Malcolm Arnold, Alun Hoddinott, Daniel Jones, Nicholas Maw, Michael Tippett and Grace Williams.
- The Aldeburgh Festival Variations, also known as Variations on "Sumer Is Icumen In", was premiered in 1987. It contains variations by Oliver Knussen, Robin Holloway, Judith Weir, Robert Saxton, Alexander Goehr, Colin Matthews and David Bedford.

=== Concertante works ===
- In 1833, Felix Mendelssohn and Ignaz Moscheles collaborated on a work for two pianos and orchestra, Fantasy and Variations on the "Gypsy March" from Carl Maria von Weber's 'La Preziosa'. Moscheles later made an arrangement for two pianos alone. The manuscript score of this arrangement, inscribed by both Moscheles and Mendelssohn, was presented by Moscheles's son to Anton Rubinstein, and is in the library of the Saint Petersburg Conservatory.
- Ungarische Zigeunerweisen is a piece for piano and orchestra, dating from 1885. It has a curious and still uncertain origin. The piano part was written either by Sophie Menter or Franz Liszt or possibly both had a hand in it. The piece was orchestrated by Pyotr Ilyich Tchaikovsky in 1892, and premiered under his baton in Odessa in 1893, with Sophie Menter as the soloist.

=== Vocal and choral ===
- In the early 1830s, Felix Mendelssohn published two sets of 12 songs each, as Opp. 8 and 9. Three songs in each set were written by his sister Fanny Mendelssohn. While each song was the product of one composer alone, as sets, they were collaborations.
- In 1840, around the time of their marriage, Robert Schumann and Clara Schumann published a set of 12 songs called Gedichte aus Liebesfruhling (Love's Spring). Clara wrote numbers 2, 4 and 11, while Robert wrote the rest. It was published as Robert's Op. 37, but Clara's songs were also given the opus number 12 in her own catalogue of works.
- Shortly after Gioachino Rossini's death in November 1868, Giuseppe Verdi decided that a Requiem Mass in his memory would be appropriate. He commissioned 12 composers to write a section each, and together with Verdi's own section, Libera me, the Messa per Rossini would be performed on 13 November 1869, the first anniversary of Rossini's death. The other composers were Antonio Bazzini, Raimondo Boucheron, Antonio Buzzolla, Antonio Cagnoni, Carlo Coccia, Gaetano Gaspari, Teodulo Mabellini, Alessandro Nini, Carlo Pedrotti, Pietro Platania, Federico Ricci, and Lauro Rossi. The performance was cancelled only a few days before it was due to take place. It did not have its premiere until 1988, in Stuttgart. In the meantime, Verdi had taken his Libera me and incorporated it into his Requiem for Alessandro Manzoni, this time a work written by himself alone, which was performed in May 1874, on the first anniversary of Manzoni's death.
- In 1881, Gabriel Fauré and André Messager collaborated on Messe des pêcheurs de Villerville (Mass of the Fishermen of Villerville). Messager wrote sections 1 and 4 (Kyrie and O Salutaris), and Fauré wrote sections 2, 3 and 5 (Gloria Benedictus, Sanctus and Agnus Dei). The first performance was accompanied by a harmonium and a violin. For the second performance with orchestra the following year, Messager orchestrated the first four sections, and Fauré the last.
- Also in 1881, shortly after Modest Mussorgsky's death, Alexander Glazunov and Nikolai Rimsky-Korsakov worked together on orchestrating Mussorgsky's song cycle Songs and Dances of Death. Glazunov orchestrated Nos. 1 and 3; Rimsky-Korsakov Nos. 2 and 4.
- In 1945 appeared Genesis Suite, for narrator, chorus and orchestra, a collaboration between Mario Castelnuovo-Tedesco, Darius Milhaud, Arnold Schoenberg, Nathaniel Shilkret, Igor Stravinsky, Alexandre Tansman and Ernst Toch.
- Mouvements du cœur: Un hommage à la mémoire de Frédéric Chopin, 1849–1949 is a collaborative Suite of songs for baritone or bass and piano on words of Louise Lévêque de Vilmorin to commemorate the centennial of the death of Frédéric Chopin in 1949. Contributing composers include Henri Sauguet, Francis Poulenc, Georges Auric, Jean Françaix, Léo Preger and Darius Milhaud.
- In 1992, a group of Italian composers including Lorenzo Ferrero, Giovanni Sollima, Marco Tutino and others wrote a Requiem per le vittime della mafia, which is a collaborative composition for soloists, choir and orchestra, on an Italian text by Vincenzo Consolo. The requiem was first performed in the Palermo Cathedral on 27 March 1993.
- In 2015, the Gallipoli Symphony for orchestra, chorus and instrumentalists had its first performance in Istanbul. It was commissioned by the Australian Department of Veterans' Affairs to celebrate the centenary of the Gallipoli Campaign in World War I. The composers were from Australia (Ross Edwards, Elena Kats-Chernin, Graeme Koehne, Peter Sculthorpe and Andrew Schultz), New Zealand (Gareth Farr, Ross Harris and Richard Nunns), and Turkey (Demir Demirkan, Kamran Ince and Omar Faruk Tekbilek).

=== Chamber music ===
- In 1832, Frédéric Chopin and Auguste Franchomme wrote a Grand Duo Concertant for cello and piano, based on themes from Giacomo Meyerbeer's opera Robert le diable. Chopin sketched the broad structure of the work and wrote the piano part, and Franchomme wrote the cello part.
- The F-A-E Sonata is a sonata for violin and piano, written in 1853 as a gift for Joseph Joachim by Albert Dietrich (first movement), Robert Schumann (second and fourth movements), and Johannes Brahms (third movement).
- In 1886, four composers wrote a string quartet in honour of Mitrofan Belyayev, each movement being based on the theme B-La-F. The four composers were Alexander Borodin, Alexander Glazunov, Anatoly Lyadov and Nikolai Rimsky-Korsakov.
- In 1886, the suite for string quartet, Fridays (Les Vendredis), was written by Nikolai Artsybushev, Borodin, Felix Blumenfeld, Glazunov, Alexander Kopylov, Lyadov, Maximilian D'Osten-Sacken, Rimsky-Korsakov, Nikolai Sokolov and Joseph Wihtol. Borodin later orchestrated his section as the Scherzo of his Symphony No. 3, which was left unfinished at his death and later completed by Glazunov.
- In 1887, Glazunov, Lyadov and Rimsky-Korsakov wrote a string quartet called "Name Day" (Jour de Fete).
- In 1899, ten Russian composers wrote Variations on a Russian Theme for string quartet. They were Artsybushev, Blumenfeld, Victor Ewald, Glazunov, Lyadov, Rimsky-Korsakov, Alexander Scriabin, Sokolov, Wihtol and Alexander Winkler.
- In 1908, the Hambourg String Quartet commissioned York Bowen, Frank Bridge, Eric Coates, J. D. Davis (John David Davis) and Hamilton Harty to each compose a movement of a work for string quartet which incorporated the Irish melody Londonderry Air. The resulting Suite on Londonderry Air was performed by the Quartet at Aeolian Hall the same year. The Davis contribution was published in expanded form as his Some variations on the Londonderry Air, Op. 43 (1910). Bridge's movement was published as An Irish Melody in 1915.
- On the occasion of Paul Sacher's 70th birthday in 1976, twelve composer-friends of his (Conrad Beck, Luciano Berio, Pierre Boulez, Benjamin Britten, Henri Dutilleux, Wolfgang Fortner, Alberto Ginastera, Cristóbal Halffter, Hans Werner Henze, Heinz Holliger, Klaus Huber and Witold Lutosławski) were asked by Russian cellist Mstislav Rostropovich to write compositions for cello solo using Sacher's name spelt out in musical notes as the theme (eS, A, C, H, E, Re). The complete set of pieces received its premiere in Prague in May 2011.
- In 2009, the Seraphim Trio commissioned Variations on a Waltz by Schubert for piano trio, from 8 Australian composers: Andrew Ford, Ian Munro, Calvin Bowman, Raymond Chapman-Smith, Joe Chindamo, Andrea Keller, Elena Kats-Chernin and Roger Smalley.
- In 2015, pianist Ashley Wass and violinist Matthew Trusler commissioned the suite Wonderland, based on the popular children's story Alice in Wonderland, from thirteen contemporary composers: Sally Beamish, Roxanna Panufnik, Mark-Anthony Turnage, Stuart MacRae, Poul Ruders, Howard Blake, Carl Davis, Stephen Hough, Richard Dubugnon, Ilya Gringolts, Colin Matthews, Gwilym Simcock and Augusta Read Thomas.

=== Guitar ===
- Stephen Dodgson and Hector Quine have jointly written a number of studies for solo guitar.

=== Piano solo ===
- In 1819, the publisher Anton Diabelli invited a large number of Austrian composers to each write a variation on a little waltz (or ländler) he had composed, to go into an anthology to be called Vaterländischer Künstlerverein, and 51 of them responded. Ludwig van Beethoven composed not one but 33 variations, which were originally published as his Diabelli Variations, Op. 120, and later as Part I of the anthology. Part II comprised the single variations by each of the 50 other composers. These people are mostly now forgotten, but they include such names as Carl Czerny, Franz Schubert, Franz Liszt and Johann Nepomuk Hummel. Part II has long since become a musical footnote, while Beethoven's set quickly acquired a life of its own and is considered one of the greatest achievements of the piano literature.
- Hexameron (1837) is a set of variations on a theme from Vincenzo Bellini's opera I puritani, written on a commission given to Franz Liszt, who invited other composers to participate. The others were Frédéric Chopin, Carl Czerny, Henri Herz, Johann Peter Pixis and Sigismond Thalberg.
- In 1879, Alexander Borodin, César Cui, Franz Liszt, Anatoly Lyadov and Nikolai Rimsky-Korsakov wrote a series of paraphrases on Chopsticks.
- In 1885, Nikolai Artsybushev, Alexander Glazunov, Lyadov, Nikolai Sokolov, Rimsky-Korsakov and Joseph Wihtol wrote a Joke Quadrille for piano.
- In 1896, Anton Arensky, Glazunov, Sergei Rachmaninoff and Sergei Taneyev jointly wrote Four Improvisations.
- In 1900, Felix Blumenfeld, Glazunov, Lyadov, Rimsky-Korsakov, Sokolov, Wihtol and Alexander Winkler wrote Variations on a Russian Theme.
- In 1941, 17 composers were commissioned to write a piece each for a collection to be called Homage to Paderewski, in honour of the 50th jubilee of Ignacy Jan Paderewski's 1891 American debut. However, he died in June 1941 and the album was published in 1942 to commemorate his entire life and work. The composers were: Béla Bartók, Arthur Benjamin, Benjamin Britten, Mario Castelnuovo-Tedesco, Theodore Chanler, Eugene Goossens, Richard Hammond, Felix Labunski, Bohuslav Martinů, Darius Milhaud, Joaquín Nin-Culmell, Karol Rathaus, Vittorio Rieti, Ernest Schelling, Zygmunt Stojowski, Jaromír Weinberger and Emerson Whithorne.
- Round Midnight Variations is a collection of variations on the song " 'Round Midnight " by Thelonious Monk, composed by Roberto Andreoni, Milton Babbitt, Alberto Barbero, Carlo Boccadoro, William Bolcom, David Crumb. George Crumb, Michael Daugherty, Filippo Del Corno, John Harbison, Joel Hoffman, Aaron Jay Kernis, Gerald Levinson, Tobias Picker, Matthew Quayle, Frederic Rzewski, Augusta Read Thomas and Michael Torke.

=== Piano four-hands ===
- In c. 1888, remembering their 1883 trip to the Bayreuth Festival to hear Richard Wagner's Ring Cycle, Gabriel Fauré and André Messager wrote a piece for piano four-hands called Souvenir de Bayreuth (subtitled Fantaisie en forme de quadrille sur les thèmes favoris de L'Anneau Du Nibelung de Richard Wagner). It was not published during their lifetimes and appeared in print only in 1930.

=== Electroacoustic music ===
- Collaboration has been a constant feature of Electroacoustic music, due to the complexity of the technology. Since the beginning, all laboratories and electronic music studios have involved the presence of different individuals with diverse but intertwined competencies. In particular, the embedding of technological tools into the process of musical creation resulted in the emergence of a new agent with new expertise: the musical assistant, the technician, the tutor, the computer music designer, the music mediator (a profession that has been described and defined in different ways over the years) – who can work in the phase of writing, creating new instruments, recording and/or performance. He or she explains the possibilities of the various instruments and applications, as well as the potential sound effects to the composer (when the latter did not have sufficient knowledge of the programme or a clear idea of what he or she could obtain from it). The musical assistant also explains the most recent results in musical research and translates artistic ideas into programming languages. Finally, he or she transforms those ideas into a score or a computer program and often performs the musical piece during the concerts. Examples of collaboration are numerous: Pierre Boulez and Andrew Gerzso, Alvise Vidolin and Luigi Nono, Jonathan Harvey and Gilbert Nouno, among others. Composers remain the sole authors of this music works, whereas musical assistants are mentioned within the musical documentation (scores, press, program notes) as music assistants or computer music designers.

== Other forms of musical collaboration ==
Another case of note was that of Eric Fenby, who worked as amanuensis for the blind Frederick Delius. Delius would dictate the notes and Fenby would transcribe them. While Fenby was himself a composer, these works on which he and Delius worked together were a collaboration in terms of the labour involved in writing them down, but not in terms of the musical ideas, which were entirely Delius's own.

Film scores over the years have tended to be collaborative projects in various ways, from the simple matter of orchestrators working with the sketches by the composer, to multi-composer collaborative efforts. Originally, with the studio system, composers often contributed parts of a score assigned by the head of the music department. Sometimes this was music not specific to that film for lower budget movies. In modern times, collaboration is seen in such groups as Remote Control Productions. True collaboration has also occurred, with such varied examples as Bernard Herrmann and Alfred Newman, who together composed the music for The Egyptian (1954); and Hans Zimmer and James Newton Howard, who wrote the music for two Batman films, Batman Begins (2005) and The Dark Knight (2008).

== Transformations ==
There are various cases where a later composer has transformed an existing work or group of works into a new form, but this would generally be considered an arrangement by another hand, rather than a collaboration. Examples of this would include:

- Franz Liszt's many piano arrangements of symphonies and other works by composers such as Ludwig van Beethoven and Franz Schubert. Liszt was the most prominent of a great number of composers who arranged the works of others for other combinations of instruments.
- Charles Gounod took the harmonies from Johann Sebastian Bach's Prelude No. 1 in C major from Book I of The Well-Tempered Clavier, and added his own melodic line, setting it to the words of the prayer Hail Mary (in Latin, Ave Maria). His setting was called Ave Maria.
- Edvard Grieg wrote additional piano parts for a number of solo piano sonatas by Wolfgang Amadeus Mozart, to be played simultaneously with the original music, on piano four-hands. Mozart's original score was untouched. The resultant work is certainly music by both Mozart and Grieg, however they did not collaborate in the ordinary sense of the term, Mozart having died 52 years before Grieg was born.
- Leopold Godowsky's reworking of Frédéric Chopin's études by playing two études simultaneously, or playing in the left hand the music originally written for the right hand, and vice versa. (See Studies on Chopin's Études.)
- Arthur Benjamin took a number of unrelated harpsichord sonatas by Domenico Cimarosa, arranged them for oboe and orchestra, and grouped them into a work he called "Oboe Concerto on Themes of Cimarosa". Concert promoters and record companies often gave it the misleading title Oboe Concerto by Cimarosa, arr. Benjamin, but in this form it was perhaps more Benjamin's work than Cimarosa's.
- In a similar but slightly different vein, Alan Kogosowski arranged three solo piano pieces by Frédéric Chopin for piano and orchestra, and grouped them into a work that he himself gave the misleading title "Piano Concerto No. 3 in A major by Chopin".
- During the Chinese Cultural Revolution, a group of six composers including Yin Chengzong rearranged the Yellow River Cantata by Xian Xinghai into a four-movement piano concerto entitled Yellow River Piano Concerto.

== Completions ==
There are also instances where a work was left unfinished at the composer's death, and was completed by another composer. In such cases, the later composer generally strives to ensure the finished product is as close as possible to the original composer's intentions, as revealed by their notes, rough drafts, or other evidence. One of the best known examples is the completion by Franco Alfano of Giacomo Puccini's opera Turandot. There may also be a case for describing Sir Edward Elgar's Symphony No. 3 as a work by both Elgar and Anthony Payne. However, these types of works cannot properly be called collaborations.
