= Campra =

Campra may refer to:

== Music ==
- La Guirlande de Campra, collaborative orchestral work written by seven French composers in 1952
- La Guirlande de Campra (ballet), ballet made at the New York City Ballet

== People ==
- André Campra (1660–1744), French composer and conductor of the Baroque era
- Carla Campra (born 1999), Spanish actress and model
- Guillermo Campra (born 1997), Spanish actor
