= Hexaméron (musical composition) =

Collaborative musical composition pub. 1839

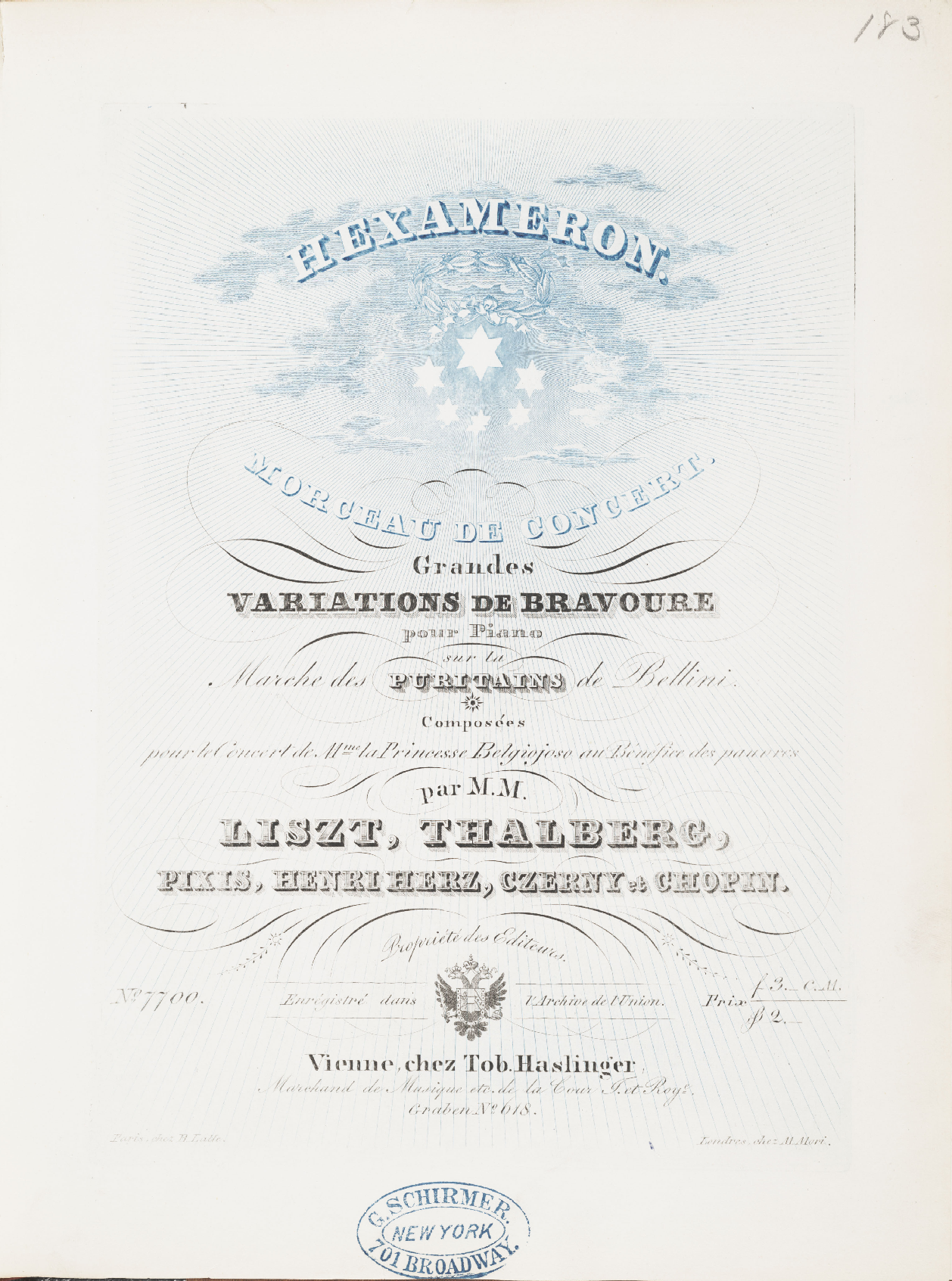
Cover art of the score for the first publication in 1839

Hexaméron, Morceau de concert S.392 is a collaborative composition for piano. It exists in several concert versions: for piano solo, piano and orchestra, two pianos and even six pianos with or without orchestra. The work consists of six variations on a theme, along with an introduction, connecting interludes and a finale. The theme is the "suoni la tromba" from Vincenzo Bellini's opera I puritani.

Princess Cristina Trivulzio Belgiojoso conceived the piece in 1837 and persuaded Franz Liszt to assemble a set of variations of the march along with five of his pianist-friends. Liszt composed the introduction, second variation, connecting sections and finale, and integrated the piece into an artistic unity. Five well-known composer-performers each contributed one variation: Frédéric Chopin, Carl Czerny, Henri Herz, Johann Peter Pixis and Sigismond Thalberg.

Princess Belgiojoso commissioned Hexaméron—the title refers to the Biblical six days of creation—for a benefit concert for the poor on 31 March 1837 at the princess's salon in Paris. The musicians did not complete the piece on time, but the concert was held as scheduled. The concert's highlight was a piano "duel" between Thalberg and Liszt for the title of "greatest pianist in the world." Princess Belgiojoso announced her diplomatic judgment: "Thalberg is the first pianist in the world–Liszt is unique."

Hexaméron is divided into nine parts:

1. Introduction: Extremement lent (Liszt)
2. Tema: Allegro marziale (transcribed by Liszt)
3. Variation I: Ben marcato (Thalberg)
4. Variation II: Moderato (Liszt)
5. Variation III: di bravura (Pixis) - Ritornello (Liszt)
6. Variation IV: Legato e grazioso (Herz)
7. Variation V: Vivo e brillante (Czerny) - Fuocoso molto energico; Lento quasi recitativo (Liszt)
8. Variation VI: Largo (Chopin) - (coda) (Liszt)
9. Finale: Molto vivace quasi prestissimo (Liszt)

Pianists Ingolf Wunder, Raymond Lewenthal, Leslie Howard, Francesco Nicolosi and Marc-André Hamelin, among others, have recorded the piece.

Liszt made several versions of the piece: for piano and orchestra (S.365b) and for two pianos (S.654). It was also performed in a concert version for six pianos and orchestra. Pianists Ingolf Wunder, Leslie Howard and Eugene List recorded the orchestral version.

In 2009, six New York–based composer-pianists—Matthew Cameron, Corbin Beisner, Simone Ferraresi, Quentin Kim, Greg Anderson, and Hwaen Chu'qi—created their own Hexameron Variations based on the same Bellini "March". It premiered at the 2010 American Liszt Society Festival in Lincoln, Nebraska, US.
