= Humphrey Searle =

English composer (1915–1982)

Humphrey Searle

Humphrey Searle (26 August 1915 – 12 May 1982) was an English composer and writer on music. His music combines aspects of late Romanticism and modernist serialism, particularly reminiscent of his primary influences, Franz Liszt, Arnold Schoenberg and Anton Webern, who was briefly his teacher. As a writer on music, Searle published texts on numerous topics; he was an authority on the music of Franz Liszt, and created the initial cataloguing system for his works.

== Biography ==
Searle was the son of Humphrey and Charlotte Searle and, through his mother, a grandson of Sir William Schlich. He was born in Oxford where he was a classics scholar before studying—somewhat hesitantly—with John Ireland at the Royal College of Music in London, after which he went to Vienna on a six-month scholarship to become a private pupil of Anton Webern, which became decisive in his composition career.

Searle was one of the foremost pioneers of serial music in the United Kingdom, and used his role as a producer at the BBC from 1946 to 1948 to promote it. He was General Secretary of the International Society for Contemporary Music from 1947 to 1949. He accepted this post with the encouragement of the new president, Edward Clark. For Clark, he composed the Quartet for Clarinet, Bassoon, Violin and Viola, Op. 12, a musical palindrome.

Gold Coast Customs, Op. 15, was his first large scale serial work. It is a setting of the jazz-influenced poem by Edith Sitwell, scored for speakers, male chorus and orchestra, and the first of a trilogy of pieces for speaker and orchestra, to be followed by Riverrun, Op. 20 (1951, words by James Joyce) and The Shadow of Cain, Op. 22 (1952, words again by Edith Sitwell). The premiere of Gold Coast Customs took place at BBC Broadcasting House on 17 May 1949, with Edith Sitwell and Constant Lambert as the speakers.

Searle wrote his Piano Sonata, Op. 21 for a recital at the Wigmore Hall on 22 October 1951, given by the Australian pianist Gordon Watson to celebrate the 140th anniversary of the birth of Franz Liszt. (Watson also performed the complete Transcendental Études on that occasion.) The Sonata was loosely based on Liszt's Sonata in B minor and has been described as "probably, both the finest and most original piano work ever produced by a British composer".

Other works of note include a Poem for 22 Strings (1950), premiered at Darmstadt, a Gogol opera, The Diary of a Madman (1958, awarded the first prize at UNESCO's International Rostrum of Composers in 1960), and five symphonies, the first of which was commercially recorded by the London Philharmonic Orchestra in 1960, conducted by Sir Adrian Boult. Writing in 1994, Ottó Károlyi described the Symphony No. 5 as "a biographical programmatic symphony that sets out to depict, by purely musical means, highlights of Webern's life from his youth to his untimely death". All five symphonies have since been recorded by the Scottish Symphony Orchestra, conducted by Alun Francis.

He also composed film scores, including music for The Baby and the Battleship (1956), Beyond Mombasa (1956), Action of the Tiger (1957), The Abominable Snowman (1957), Law and Disorder (1958), Left Right and Centre (1959), October Moth (1960) and The Haunting (1963), as well the 1965 Doctor Who serial The Myth Makers.

Searle also contributed humorous compositions to some of the Hoffnung Music Festivals, including a setting of Young Lochinvar and a parody of serialism, Punkt Kontrapunkt.

Searle taught throughout his life; his notable students included Hugh Davidson, Brian Elias, Michael Finnissy, Jonathan Elias, Nicola LeFanu, Alistair Hinton, Geoffrey King, Graham Newcater and Wolfgang Rihm. See: List of music students by teacher: R to S#Humphrey Searle.

Searle wrote the monographs Twentieth Century Counterpoint and The Music of Franz Liszt. He also developed the most authoritative catalogue of Liszt's works, which are frequently identified using Searle's numbering system, abbreviated as "S.".

Searle married Fiona Nicholson in 1960. He died in London in 1982, aged 66.

== List of works ==
=== Operas ===
- The Diary of a Madman (1958)
- The Photo of the Colonel (1963–64)
- Hamlet (1964–68)

=== Ballets ===
- Noctambules (1956)
- The Great Peacock (1957–58)
- Dualities (1963)

=== Orchestral ===
- Variations on an Elizabethan Theme, jointly composed with Lennox Berkeley, Benjamin Britten, Arthur Oldham, Michael Tippett and William Walton (1953)
- Symphony No. 1 (1953)
- Symphony No. 2 (1956–58)
- Symphony No. 3 (1959–60)
- Symphony No. 4 (1961–62)
- Symphony No. 5 (1964)
- Sinfonietta (1968–69)
- Labyrinth (1971)
- Three Ages (1982)

=== Piano concertos ===
- Piano Concerto No. 1 (1944)
- Piano Concerto No. 2 (1955)

=== Suites ===
- Suite No. 1 for Strings (1942)
- Suite No. 2 (1943)
- Night Music (1943)
- Poem for 22 Strings (1950)
- Concertante for Piano, Strings and Percussion (1954)
- Scherzi (1964)
- Hamlet Suite (1968)
- Zodiac Variations (1970)
- Tamesis (1979)

=== Chorus and instruments ===
- Gold Coast Customs (1947–49) for speakers, male chorus and orchestra
- The Riverrun (Joyce) (1951) for speakers and orchestra
- The Shadow of Cain (1952) for speakers, male chorus and orchestra
- Jerusalem (1970) for speakers, tenor, chorus and orchestra
- My Beloved Spake (1976) for chorus and organ
- Dr Faustus (1977) for solo woman, chorus and orchestra

=== Voice and orchestra ===
- 3 Songs of Jocelyn Brooke (1954) for high voice and ensemble
- Oxus (1967) for tenor and orchestra
- Contemplations (1975) for mezzo-soprano and orchestra
- Kubla Khan (1973) for tenor and orchestra

=== Unaccompanied chorus ===
- The Canticle of the Rose (Sitwell, 1965)
- Rhyme Rude to My Pride (1974) for male chorus

=== Chamber music ===
- Bassoon Quintet (1945)
- Intermezzo for 11 Instruments (1946)
- Quartet for Clarinet, Bassoon, Violin and Viola, Op. 12 (1948; a musical palindrome)
- Passacaglietta in nomine Arnold Schoenberg (1949) for string quartet
- Gondoliera (1950) for celesta and piano
- 3 Cat Poems (1951/53): "The Owl and the Pussy-Cat" for speaker, flute, cello and guitar and "Two Practical Cats" for speaker, flute/piccolo, cello and guitar
- Suite for Clarinet and Piano (1956)
- Three Movements for String Quartet (1959)
- Cello Fantasia (1972)
- Il Penseroso e L'Allegro (1975) for cello and piano

=== Song cycle ===
- Les fleurs du mal (1972) for tenor, horn and piano

=== Songs ===
- Two Songs of A.E. Housman, op. 9 (1946): March Past (On the idle hill of summer) and The Stinging-Nettle, for voice and piano
- Counting the Beats (1963) for high voice and piano

=== Piano ===
- Sonata (1951)
- Suite (1955)
- Prelude on a Theme by Rawsthorne (1965)

=== Guitar ===
- Five Op.61 (1974)

== Selected bibliography ==
- Searle, Humphrey (1954). The Music of Liszt. London: Williams & Norgate. OCLC 1150845218.
- —— (1954). Twentieth Century Counterpoint. New York: John De Graff Inc.
- —— (1958). Ballet Music: An Introduction. New York: Dover Publications Inc.

== Sources ==
- Mason, Colin (2001). "Searle, Humphrey". Grove Music Online. Revised by Hugo Cole and David C.F. Wright. Oxford: Oxford University Press. doi:10.1093/gmo/9781561592630.article.25279. ISBN 978-1-56159-263-0. (subscription, Wikilibrary access, or UK public library membership required)
- Watson, Derek (6 January 2011) [23 September 2004]. "Searle, Humphrey". Oxford Dictionary of National Biography. Oxford: Oxford University Press. doi:10.1093/ref:odnb/31668. ISBN 978-0-19-861412-8. (subscription, Wikipedia Library access or UK public library membership required)
