= Ottó Károlyi =

Ottó Károlyi (26 March 1934 – 30 November 2015) was a musicologist of Hungarian background, born in Paris who lived and worked for most of his career in the United Kingdom. He studied in Budapest, Vienna, and London, taking a diploma at Trinity College of Music and a degree at the University of London. He became a teacher at schools, adult education establishments, conservatories and universities, as well as a musicologist, broadcaster and author on musical subjects. In the mid-1990s he was Senior Lecturer of Music at the University of Stirling, Scotland, where he founded the Music department and remained employed even after the department's closure.

== Personal life ==
Károlyi married Heather Goodare in 1957; they had a son, born in 1971 but the marriage broke up. He later married Benedikte Uttenthal. Károlyi died in 2015 at the age of 81.

== Bibliography ==
- (1965). Introducing Music. ISBN 978-0-14-013114-7.
- (1980). Musik. Ein Führer zum besseren Verstehen (Music. A guide for better understanding) ISBN 9783473430758.
- (1994). Modern British Music: The Second British Musical Renaissance--From Elgar to P. Maxwell Davies. ISBN 978-0-8386-3532-2.
- (1995). Introducing Modern Music ISBN 978-0140131147.
- (1996). Modern American Music--From Charles Ives to the Minimalists. ISBN 978-0-8386-3725-8.
- (1999). Traditional African And Oriental Music ISBN 9780140231076.
- (2000). La grammatica della musica (The grammar of music) ISBN 9788806154448.
- (2005). Introducción a la música del siglo XX (Introduction to music of the 20th Century) ISBN 978-8420637822.
