= Variations on an Elizabethan Theme =

Set of variations for string orchestra

Variations on an Elizabethan Theme (also seen as Variations on Sellinger's Round) is a set of variations for string orchestra, written collaboratively in 1952 by six English composers: Lennox Berkeley, Benjamin Britten, Arthur Oldham, Humphrey Searle, Michael Tippett and William Walton.

Imogen Holst also played an important role in orchestrating the overall work, but she did not write a variation of her own.

The variations were written to celebrate the forthcoming coronation of Queen Elizabeth II in June 1953. (Benjamin Britten also wrote his opera Gloriana in honour of this occasion.)

== Background ==
At the Aix-en-Provence Festival in July 1952, Benjamin Britten had attended the premiere of La guirlande de Campra, a collaborative work by seven French composers, and this gave him the idea of inviting several English composers to join him in each writing a variation on a theme from the time of the first Queen Elizabeth to honour her modern-day successor.

Lennox Berkeley, Michael Tippett and William Walton all readily accepted Britten's invitation. Alan Rawsthorne declined outright. Edmund Rubbra initially agreed, but pulled out of the project at the eleventh hour, at which time Arthur Oldham and Humphrey Searle were brought in.

The theme was Sellinger's Round or The Beginning of the World, an Irish dance tune, as harmonised for the keyboard by William Byrd, the leading composer from the time of Elizabeth I. It was orchestrated for the occasion by Imogen Holst, but she did not provide a variation of her own.

== Structure ==
The work was structured as follows:

- Theme (anon; harmonised by William Byrd; arranged for string orchestra by Imogen Holst)
- Variation 1: Allegro non troppo (Arthur Oldham)
- Variation 2: A Lament, Andante espressivo (Michael Tippett)
  - The variation begins and ends with a transcription of 'Ah Belinda!' from Henry Purcell's Dido and Aeneas, over which a solo violin plays a decorated version of the theme. Tippett's variation later became well known as part of his separate piece, Divertimento on Sellinger's Round
- Variation 3: Andante (Lennox Berkeley)
- Variation 4: Quick and Gay (Benjamin Britten)
- Variation 5: Nocturne, Adagio (Humphrey Searle)
  - Britten considered this the most original of all the variations
- Variation 6: Finale, Fuga à la gigue, Presto giocoso (William Walton)
  - Walton starts with an inversion of the theme, and concludes with the inversion combined with the original theme.

== Premieres ==
The public premiere was held on 20 June 1953, as part of the Coronation Choral Concert at the 1953 Aldeburgh Festival. However, it was also broadcast live on the BBC Third Programme four days earlier, 16 June. Both performances were conducted by Benjamin Britten. The public performance was recorded and has been released on CD.

William Walton proposed that each variation include a brief quotation from another work by the same composer. His own quotation was from his Portsmouth Point Overture. Britten's quotation was his "Green leaves we are" theme from Gloriana.

The audience at the Aldeburgh Festival premiere was not told which composer wrote which variation, but were invited to participate in a guessing competition to raise funds for the festival. Nobody correctly guessed all the names.

As part of the 2013 season of The Proms, two more variations were commissioned by the BBC from John Woolrich and Tansy Davies, being inserted in that order before Walton's concluding variation. The new sequence of eight variations was given its premiere by the English Chamber Orchestra, conducted by Paul Watkins, in the Cadogan Hall, London, on 24 August 2013.
