= Géza Frid =

Hungarian–Dutch composer and pianist

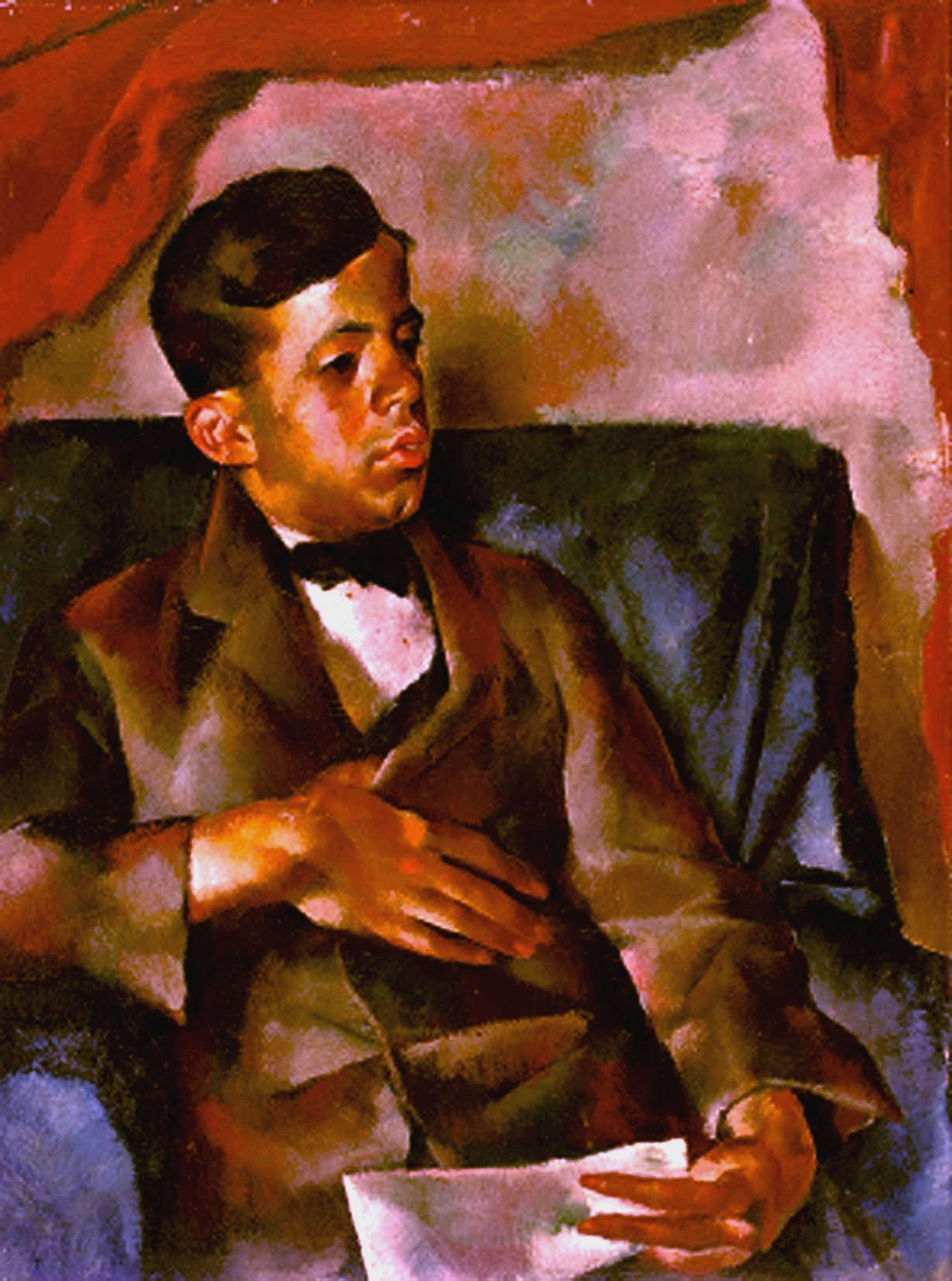
Portrait painting by Vilmos Aba-Novák

Géza Frid (25 January 1904 – 13 September 1989) was a Hungarian–Dutch composer and pianist.

== Early years ==
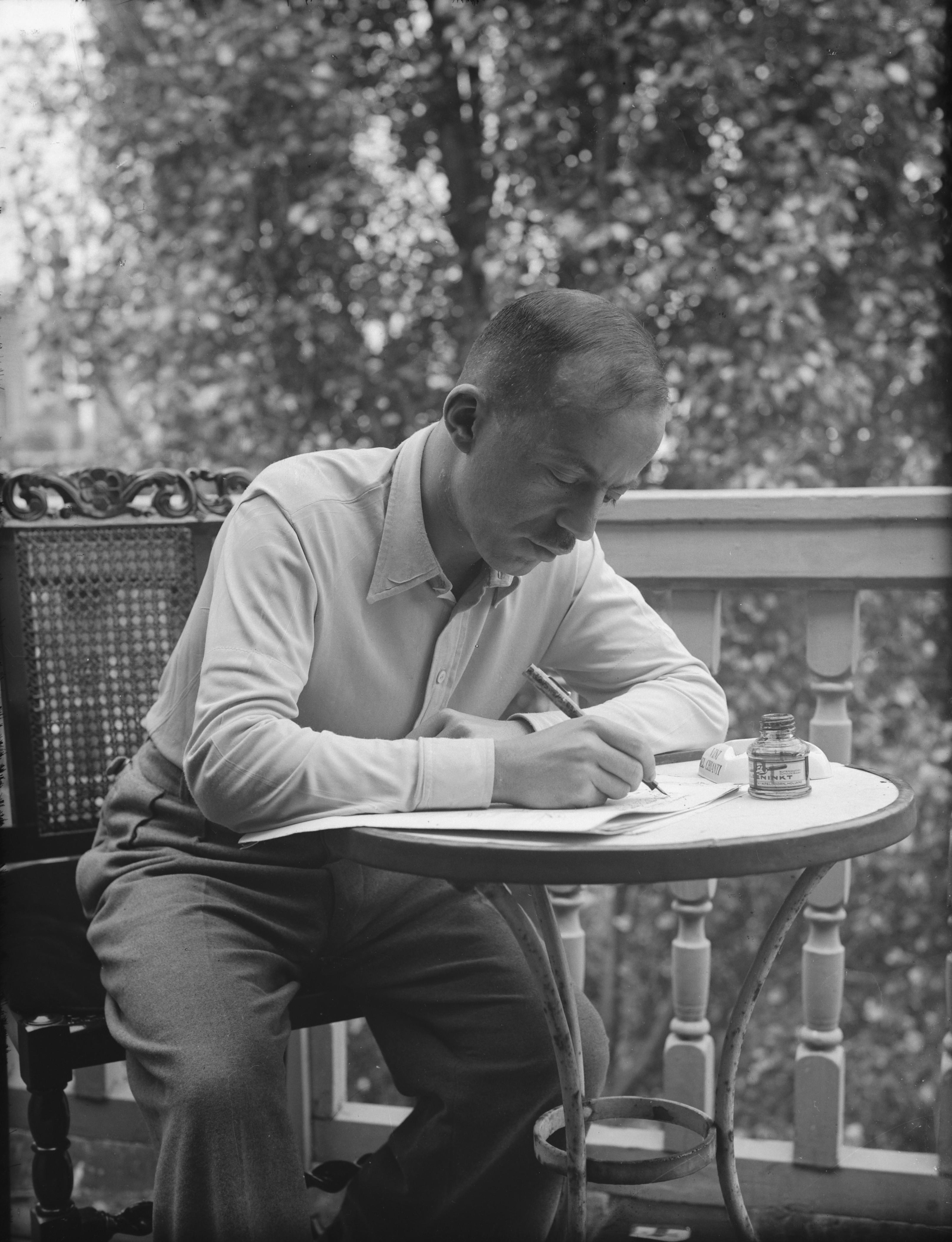
Géza Frid (around 1935)

Géza Frid was born in Máramarossziget in the Máramaros County of Austria-Hungary (present-day Romania) and studied piano and composition in Budapest with a.o. Zoltán Kodály and Béla Bartók. He settled in Amsterdam in 1929 and became a Dutch citizen in 1948. He died in Beverwijk and was buried at Zorgvlied cemetery.

== Activities ==
Frid gave many piano recitals all over the world: Italy (1926, 1955, 1965), Indonesia (1948–1949, 1951, 1956), Siam and Egypt (1951), Israel (1962, 1965, 1967), the Soviet Union, (1963), South- and North-America (1965, 1967), Turkey (1965), The Netherlands (1967), Surinam and the Netherlands Antilles (1970), the United States (1970, 1974), Hungary (1971, 1974). During the Second World War Frid was active in the resistance. He taught chamber music at the Conservatory of Music in Utrecht.

== Publications ==
In 1976 his book Oog in oog met... (Face to face with...Tolstoj, T. Mann, G. Bomans, B. Mussolini, W. Mengelberg, B. Bartok and M. Ravel) was published (publ. Heuff). In 1984 he published his memoirs In 80 jaar de wereld rond (publ. Strengholt).

== Prizes ==
In 1949 he received the music prize of the City of Amsterdam for Paradou (fantaisie symphonique), in 1950 the second prize in the Wereldomroep-K.N.T.V.-competition for Varieties op een Nederlands Volkslied (Variations on a Dutch folksong), for choir and orchestra, and in 1951 the third prize at the Concours International pour Quatuor à Cordes for Strijkkwartet III. In 1954 he was awarded the music prize of the City of Amsterdam for Etudes Symphoniques, in 1956 the second prize from the Dutch Government for the Sonate op. 50, for violin and piano, and the fourth prize at the Concours International pour Quatuor à Cordes in Luik for Strijkkwartet IV. In 1990 Frid was posthumously awarded the Bartók prize from the Ferenc Liszt Hochschule in Budapest.

== Works ==
Stage

- Fête Champêtre (Country Fair), Ballet, Op. 38 (1951)
- Luctor et Emergo (Luctor and Emergo), Ballet, Op. 43 (1953)
- De Zwarte Bruid (The Black Bride), Opera parodistica, Op. 57 (1958); libretto by Cornelis Jan Kelk
- Euridice, Ballet, Op. 61 (1960–1961)
- Toneelmuziek bij "Twelfth Night" (Incidental Music for "Twelfth Night") for wind quintet and harp, Op. 65 (1962); for the play by William Shakespeare
- Toneelmuziek bij "Hamlet" (Incidental Music for "Hamlet") for small orchestra, Op. 68 (1964); for the play by William Shakespeare

Orchestral

- Suite, Op. 6 (1929)
- Tempesta d'orchestra, Op. 10 (1931)
- Divertimento for string orchestra (or string quintet), Op. 11 (1932)
- Symphony, Op. 13 (1933)
- Nocturnes for flute, harp and string orchestra, Op. 24 (1946)
- Paradou, Op. 28 (1948)
- Kermesse à Charleroi (Funfair in Charleroi), Op. 44 (1953); also for piano 4-hands
- Caecilia-ouverture (Caecilia Overture), Op. 45 (1954)
- Suid-Afrikaanse rhapsodie (South-African Rhapsody), Op. 46a (1954); also for wind band
- Études symfoniques (Symphonic Studies), Op. 47 (1954)
- Serenade for chamber orchestra, Op. 52 (1956)
- Fragmenten uit De Zwarte Bruid (Fragments from "The Black Bride"), Op. 57a (1959)
- Ritmische studies (Rhythmic Studies) for chamber orchestra, Op. 58 (1959); also for 2 pianos
- Variations on a Theme of Zoltán Kodály: Variation III (1962); composed in collaboration with Antal Doráti, Tibor Serly, Ödön Pártos and Sándor Veress for Kodály's 80th birthday celebration
- Symphonietta for string orchestra, Op. 66 (1963)
- Toccata, Op. 84 (1973); also for 2 pianos
- Muziek voor violen en altviolen (Music for Violins and Violas), Op. 92 (1977)

Wind band

- Varieties op een Nederlands volkslied (Variations on a Dutch Folk Song), Op. 29 (1949); also for piano solo, and chorus with orchestra
- Rhapsodie, Op. 42a (1952, 1971); original for clarinet and piano
- Suid-Afrikaanse rhapsodie (South-African Rhapsody), Op. 46b (1954); also for orchestra
- Vier schetsen (4 Sketches), Op. 72a (1966); also for piano 4-hands
- Brabant en Maramures (Brabant and Maramures), Op. 94 (1978)

Concertante

- Podiumsuite (Podium Suite) for violin and small orchestra, Op. 3a (1928, 1948); original for violin and piano
- Concerto for violin and orchestra, Op. 7 (1930)
- Concerto for piano and mixed chorus (vocalise), Op. 14 (1934)
- Romance et Allegro for cello and orchestra, Op. 16 (1928)
- Concerto for 2 violins and orchestra, Op. 40 (1952)
- Concerto for 2 pianos and orchestra, Op. 55 (1957)
- Concertino for violin, cello, piano and orchestra, Op. 63 (1961)
- Concerto for 3 violins and orchestra, Op. 78 (1969)
- Concerto for clarinets (clarinet, E♭ clarinet, alto clarinet, bass clarinet) and string orchestra, Op. 82 (1972)
- Olifant-varieties (Elephant Variations) for double bass and string orchestra, Op. 91 (1977)
- Concertino for 2 trumpets and orchestra, Op. 93 (1977)
- Concerto for viola, string orchestra and bass drum, Op. 108 (1985)

Chamber music

- String Trio, Op. 1 (1926)
- String Quartet No. 1, Op. 2 (1926)
- Podiumsuite (Podium Suite) for violin and piano, Op. 3 (1928); also orchestrated (1948)
- Wind Quintet (Serenade) for flute, 2 clarinets, bassoon and horn, Op. 4 (1928)
- Caprice Concertante for flute and piano (1930)
- Sonate en cinq pièces (Sonata in Five Movements) for cello and piano, Op. 9 (1931)
- Sonata for violin solo, Op. 18 (1936)
- String Quartet No. 2 "Fuga's" (Fugues), Op. 21 (1939)
- Sonatina for viola and piano, Op. 25 (1946)
- Piano Trio, Op. 27 (1947)
- String Quartet No. 3 "Fantasia tropica", Op. 30 (1949)
- Twintig duo's (20 Duos) for 2 violins, Op. 37 (1951)
- Tien stukken voor blokfluiten (10 Pieces for Recorders), Op. 39 (1951)
- Rhapsodie for clarinet and piano, Op. 42 (1952); also for wind band
- Transcripties (Transcriptions) for soprano recorder and harpsichord, Op. 49 (1955)
- Sonata for violin and piano, Op. 50 (1955)
- String Quartet No. 4, Op. 50a (1956)
- Twaalf metamorfosen (12 Metamorphoses) for 2 flutes (or wind instruments) and piano, Op. 54 (1957)
- Duet for 2 violins (1960)
- Étude rythmique (Study in Rhythm) for violin and piano (1960)
- Fuga voor harpen (Fugue for Harps) for harp ensemble, Op. 62 (1961)
- Zeven pauken en een koperorkest (Seven Timpani and a Brass Orchestra) for 7 timpani and brass ensemble, Op. 69 (1964)
- Sextet for flute, oboe, clarinet, bassoon, horn and piano, Op. 70 (1965)
- Dubbeltrio (Double Trio) for flute (piccolo), oboe (English-horn) and bassoon (contrabassoon), Op. 73 (1967)
- Gertleriade for violin solo (1967)
- Chemins divers (Separate Ways) for flute, bassoon (or 2 violins) and piano, Op. 75 (1968)
- Paganini-varieties (Paganini Variations) for 2 violin ensembles or 2 violins, Op. 77 (1968–1969)
- Duo for violin and cello, Op. 80 (1972)
- Arabesques Roumaines (Romanian Arabesques) for bamboo pipes or recorders, Op. 85a (1973–1974, 1984); original for female chorus a cappella
- Caprices Roumains (Romanian Caprices) for oboe and piano, Op. 86 (1975); also for male chorus a cappella
- Sons Roumains (Sounds of Romania) for flute, viola, harp and percussion, Op. 87 (1975)
- Kleine suite (Little Suite) for alto saxophone and piano, Op. 88 (1975)
- Vice versa I for alto saxophone and marimba, Op. 95 (1982)
- Vice Versa II for viola and piano, Op. 96 (1982)
- Symmetrie I for winds and percussion, Symmetrie II for winds and piano, Op. 98 (1984)
- String Quartet No. 5, Op. 99 (1984)
- Symmetrie III for piccolo, violin, cello and bassoon, Op. 100 (1985)

Piano

- Sonata, Op. 5 (1929)
- Twaalf muzikale caricaturen (12 Musical Caricatures), Op. 8 (1930)
- Vier études (4 Studies), Op. 12 (1932)
- Drie stukken (3 Pieces), Op. 17 (1927–1936)
- Preludium en fuga (Prelude and Fugue) for 2 pianos, Op. 23 (1945)
- Varieties op een Nederlands volkslied (Variations on a Dutch Folk Song), Op. 29a (1949); original for wind band; also for chorus with orchestra
- Kermesse à Charleroi (Funfair in Charleroi) for piano 4-hands, Op. 44a (1953); also for orchestra
- Ritmische studies (Rhythmic Studies) for 2 pianos, Op. 58a (1959); original for chamber orchestra
- Muziek voor S.D. (Music for S.D.) for 2 pianos, Op. 67 (1963)
- Esquisses autobiographiques (Autobiographical Sketches) for piano (1964)
- Vier schetsen (4 Sketches) for piano 4-hands, Op. 72b (1966); also for wind band
- Dimensies (Dimensions) for piano and tape (or 2–3 pianos), Op. 74 (1967)
- Toccata for 2 pianos, Op. 84a (1973); also for orchestra
- Foxtrot for 2 pianos (1975); from the collaborative work Een suite voor De Suite
- Zes miniaturen (6 Miniatures), Op. 107 (1985)

Vocal

- Abel et Caïn (Abel and Cain) for bass and orchestra, Op. 15 (1935); words by Charles Baudelaire
- Vier liederen (4 Songs) for mezzo-soprano and piano, Op. 19 (1924–1938); words by Endre Ady
- Schopenhauer-Cantate (Schopenhauer Cantata) for voice and orchestra, Op. 22 (1938–1944); words by Arthur Schopenhauer
- Vox amantium for voice and piano Op. 26 (1947); words by Albert Helman
- Drie romances (3 Romances) for soprano and piano, Op. 41 (1952, orchestrated 1955); words by Heinrich Heine
- Kinderliedjes I (Songs for Children I) for mezzo-soprano or children's chorus and piano, Op. 53 (1957); words by Annie M. G. Schmidt
- Kinderliedjes II (Songs for Children II) for mezzo-soprano or children's chorus and piano, Op. 56 (1958); words by Albert Verwey, Petrus Augustus de Génestet, Gijsbert Lovendaal
- Abschied (Farewell) for male voice and piano, Op. 59 (1960); words by Hermann Hesse
- Auf Reise (Travels), Song Cycle for tenor and piano, Op. 60 (1960); words by Hermann Hesse
- Drie Shakespeare-liederen (3 Shakespeare Songs) for baritone and harp (or piano), Op. 65a (1962); words by William Shakespeare
- Venedig (Venice), Song Cycle for male voice and piano, Op. 83 (1973); words by Hermann Hesse
- Drie gedichten (3 Poems) for narrator, alto saxophone and guitar, Op. 89 (1976); words by Igor Streepjes, Petrus Augustus de Génestet, Albert Verwey
- Duet in twee talen (Duet in Two Languages) for soprano, alto and marimba or piano, Op. 106 (1985)

Choral

- Fiat Lux for double male chorus, Op. 20 (1938); words by Guido Gezelle
- Varieties op een Nederlands volkslied (Variations on a Dutch Folk Song), Op. 29b (1949); original for wind band; also for piano solo
- Zeven drinkliederen (7 Drinking Songs) for male chorus a cappella, Op. 31 (1950)
- Hymne aan de arbeid (Hymn to Work) for male chorus and orchestra, Op. 32 (1951)
- Spreekwoorden (Proverbs), 2 Series for male chorus a cappella, Op. 33 (1950–1951)
- Vier gemengde koren (4 Mixed Choruses) for mixed chorus a cappella, Op. 34 (1950–1951)
- Tien klaagliederen (10 Lamentations) for female chorus a cappella, Op. 35 (1951)
- Spreuken en citaten (Sayings and Quotes), 2 Series for mixed chorus a cappella, Op. 36 (1951)
- Muziek uit Luctor et Emergo (Music from "Luctor and Emergo") for chorus and orchestra, Op. 43a (1953)
- Suite for mixed chorus and piano, Op. 48 (1955); Old-Dutch Songs
- Das Sklavenschiff (The Slave Ship) for tenor and baritone solos, male chorus, brass (or piano), percussion and piano, Op. 51 (1956); words by Heinrich Heine
- Acht vocalises (8 Vocalises) for chorus a cappella, Op. 64 (1962)
- Ballade for mixed chorus and wind band, Op. 71 (1965), or for mixed chorus, string ensemble, piano 4-hands and percussion (1968); words by J. Slauerhoff
- Non far' tutto for male chorus a cappella, Op. 76 (1968)
- Houdt den Tijd! (Keeping Time!) for male chorus and percussion, Op. 79 (1970); words by Dirk Vansina
- Buurtkermis in Vlaanderen (Community Fair in Flanders) for male chorus, piano and percussion, Op. 81 (1972); words by Simoens
- Arabesques Roumaines (Romanian Arabesques) for female chorus a cappella, Op. 85 (1973–1974)
- Caprices Roumains (Romanian Caprices) for male chorus a cappella, Op. 86a (1975); also for oboe and piano
- Het kwaad der wereld (The Evil of the World) for tenor solo, male chorus and organ, Op. 90 (1976); words by Epicurus
- Drinklied (Drinking Song) for male chorus a cappella, Op. 97 (1984); words by S. Daens
- Drie Duitse koorteksten (3 German Choral Texts) for mixed chorus, Op. 101 (1985)
- Drie Franse koorteksten (3 French Choral Texts) for mixed chorus, Op. 102 (1985)
- Drie Engelse koorteksten (3 English Choral Texts) for mixed chorus, Op. 103 (1985)
- Twee Nederlandse koorteksten (2 Dutch Choral Texts) for mixed chorus, Op. 104 (1985)
- Drie Italiaanse spreekwoorden (3 Italian Proverbs) for male chorus a cappella, Op. 105 (1985)

== Compact discs ==
Releases on CD include Sinfonietta op. 66 (Q Disc Q 97006) and several chamber music compositions (Q Disc Q 87023). On the occasion of his 100th birthday the CD Géza Frid - Choral Works was released (Hungaroton Classic, HCD 32362).
