= Chopsticks (waltz) =

Musical composition by Euphemia Allan

"Chopsticks"
MIDI rendition

"Chopsticks" (original name "The Celebrated Chop Waltz") is a simple, widely known waltz for the piano. Written in 1877, it is the only published piece by the British composer Euphemia Allan (under the pen name Arthur de Lulli). Allan—whose brother, Mozart Allan, was a music publisher—was sixteen when she composed the piece, with arrangements for solo and duet. The title "Chop Waltz" comes from Allan's specification that the melody be played in two-part harmony with both hands held in a vertical orientation, little fingers down and palms facing each other, striking the keys with a chopping motion. The similar "The Coteletten Polka" was also first heard in 1877, with the piano collection Paraphrases elaborating on the theme by 1879.

== Tati-tati and Paraphrases ==
An equivalent of this rudimentary two-finger piano exercise was known in Russia in duple meter as "tati-tati" or the "Cutlet Polka". This version alternates the notes between the hands, rather than playing them at the same time in harmony.

In 1877, Alexander Borodin's daughter Gania played "The Coteletten Polka", with four bars of music similar to the beginning of Allan's work, though there is no hard evidence of a common source between the two pieces. In 1878–1879, César Cui, Anatoly Lyadov, Borodin, Nikolai Rimsky-Korsakov, and Nikolai Shcherbachov each wrote variations for piano duet on the theme, published together under the title Paraphrases. A supplementary paraphrase by Franz Liszt was later appended to the collection. In Borodin's version, the first four bars begin in a similar way to Allan's, but are nevertheless distinct. According to Fuld's book World-Famous Music, no common origins for the "Chop Waltz" and the "Coteletten Polka" have yet been discovered.

== In popular culture ==
Score, as published in 1877

- "Chopsticks" was used as the introductory music to Edgar Kennedy's series of short comedies made at the RKO Studios, from 1931 until his death in 1948.
- American composer and educator John Sylvanus Thompson published a set of variations on "Chopsticks" in 1941.
- The first three Pooch the Pup cartoons used "Chopsticks" as their opening music.
- In the 1946 William Wyler film The Best Years of Our Lives, composer Hoagy Carmichael performs a duet of "Chopsticks" with Harold Russell, a World War II Navy veteran who lost both of his hands in combat. He played the simple piece (including variations) with Hoagy taking the lower part. Mr. Russell's hooks that served as hands seemingly did not deter him from delivering a rendering of the tune, complete with a final glissando up the keyboard.
- While the 1946 Bugs Bunny short cartoon Rhapsody Rabbit mostly features Liszt's "Hungarian Rhapsody No. 2", at one point a mouse briefly plays the opening bars of "Chopsticks".
- Liberace plays a virtuoso "Chopsticks" accompanied by full orchestra early in the 1955 film Sincerely Yours.
- The theme music for the television series My Three Sons (1960–1972), written by Frank De Vol, was based on "Chopsticks", though key changes were added and the meter was changed to 4/4.
- In the 1955 Billy Wilder film The Seven Year Itch, Tom Ewell played this together with Marilyn Monroe and tried to kiss her, only to fail.
- In the 1955 season 4 episode of I Love Lucy "Ethel's Home Town", Fred Mertz (William Frawley) plays "Chopsticks".
- In the 1972 Columbo episode "Etude in Black", Columbo plays "Chopsticks" as a way to get under the skin of the pompous murderer/conductor Alex Benedict (John Cassavetes).
- "Chopsticks" accompanied the sequence in the 1972 ABC Saturday Superstar Movie Popeye Meets the Man Who Hated Laughter in which Beetle Bailey's comrade Sergeant Snorkel piles a variety of food on top of a secret message he planned to eat, Dagwood sandwich style.
- A simplified version of the tune is featured in the Manfred Mann's Earth Band’s Album version of the song "Blinded by the Light" it was not included in the shortened single version, originally by Bruce Springsteen. The Springsteen version did not contain the tune.
- In Ken Russell's Lisztomania, the audience of adolescent girls attending the first Franz Liszt concert demand that he play "Chopsticks", which he intersperses throughout a fantasia played on the piano based on themes from a Richard Wagner opera, which forces a disgusted Wagner to walk out.
- "Chopsticks" is the second song played by Tom Hanks and Robert Loggia in the famous giant piano scene at FAO Schwarz in the 1988 film Big.
- In the stage musical adaption of The Lion King, "Chopsticks" can be heard in the song "Lioness' Hunt".
- In the episode "Blind Faith" (Season 2 Episode 5) of Quantum Leap, first aired November 1, 1989, Scott Bakula leaps into a blind piano player on stage just in time for the encore performance. Bakula plays "Chopsticks" amusing the large audience in the music hall.
- The character Ryan Sinclair plays "Chopsticks" in "The Haunting of Villa Diodati", an episode of Doctor Who anachronistically set in 1816.
- The melody is quoted in Hoyt Curtin's theme to the 1960s Hanna-Barbera animated sitcom The Jetsons.
- The melody is the basis of J-pop group NiziU's 2021 single "Chopstick".
- Singer-songwriter Liz Phair opens the song “Chopsticks”, from her 1994 album Whip-Smart, with a variation of the waltz played on piano in 4/4 time, and the theme continues through the song.
- The tune was played in the Laverne & Shirley episode "Breaking Up And Making Up".
- The melody is played by Sean Penn in the 1984 film Racing with the Moon while he is teaching Elizabeth McGovern the piano in an old honky-tonk bar.
- In Brazil the melody is known as "O Bife" (The Beef). An adaptation as a song has been used since the 80s by Danone for commercials for their children's petit suisse brand Danoninho even releasing an LP in 1989 under the name "O Bifinho".
- Peter Sellers plays it for Sinéad Cusack in the 1970 feature film Hoffman.
- In the 2011 South-Korean TV Show Larva, in season 1 when Red and Yellow were playing the piano.

== See also ==
- "Heart and Soul", 1938 song by Hoagy Carmichael with lyrics by Frank Loesser with a similarly simple fingering
