= Nikolai Artsybushev =

Russian composer

Nikolai Vasilievich Artsybushev (Russian: Николай Васильевич Арцыбушев; 7 March [O.S. 23 February] 1858 – 15 April 1937) was a Russian jurist, music publisher and promoter, and minor composer. His name is sometimes seen as Artsibushev, Artsybuchev, Artzibushev, Artzybushev, Artchibousheff, Arcybusev, etc.

== Biography ==
Artsybushev was born at Tsarskoye Selo in 1858. His legal studies were at the Imperial School of Jurisprudence in Saint Petersburg, after which he practised in St Petersburg as an attorney. He also dabbled in music composition, and Nikolai Rimsky-Korsakov gave him private lessons in music theory after Mily Balakirev said his works showed some promise. He also became acquainted with the music publisher Mitrofan Belyayev and participated in his regular weekly gatherings called "Fridays" (Vendredis). To mark these occasions, a group of 10 composers including Artsybushev collaborated on a 16-part suite for string quartet, called Les Vendredis. His contribution was a Serenade in A major. He also collaborated with others on Variations on a Russian Theme, in versions for both string quartet and orchestra.

He was a member of the St Petersburg City Council. After Belyayev's death in 1903 he became chairman of the board of the Belyayev publishing house, in which capacity he had significant dealings with Alexander Scriabin. From 1908 to 1917 he was President of his city's branch of the Russian Musical Society, and later succeeded Rimsky-Korsakov as President of the Board of Trustees for the Society for the Encouragement of Russian Musicians.

In 1920 he moved to Paris and became a director of the Belyayev publishing house there. He died in Paris in 1937, aged 79.

== Music ==
His works other than those mentioned above are now little known, but include:

- Polka caractéristique, Op. 4, orchestra
- Valse-Fantaisie, Op. 9, orchestra
- Scherzo in C, orchestra (this had its premiere at the same concert at which Rimsky-Korsakov's Capriccio Espagnol was premiered)
- Songs
- Piano pieces
- Orchestral and other arrangements of works by:
  - Borodin
  - Glazunov (Suite for string quartet, Op. 35)
  - Mussorgsky (Night on Bald Mountain, for piano 4-hands; world premiere recording) and
  - Rimsky-Korsakov (Sinfonietta on Russian Themes, Op. 31).
