= Nikolai Shcherbachov =

Russian composer

Nikolai Vladimirovich Shcherbachov (in Cyrillic, Никола́й Влади́мирович Щербачёв; 12 August (N.S. 24 August) 1853 – 1 October 1922) was a Russian composer and pianist.

Born in St. Petersburg, Shcherbachov was an uncle of fellow composer Vladimir Vladimirovich Shcherbachov, who was a second cousin of Andrei Vladimirovich Shcherbachov (1869–1916). Beginning in 1871 he was associated with "The Five" (or, more broadly, the Balakirev circle).

He composed piano pieces, songs, and works for orchestra. In 1893 Shcherbachov contributed to a new edition of a collective work of the Balakirev circle that consisted of piano pieces based on the Russian version of "Chopsticks".
