= La Guirlande de Campra =

1952 French orchestral work

La Guirlande de Campra is collaborative orchestral work written by seven French composers in 1952. It is in the form of variations or meditations on a theme from André Campra's 1717 opera Camille, reine des Volsques.

The numbers and their composers are:

1. Toccata (Arthur Honegger^{*})
2. Sarabande et farandole (Daniel Lesur)
3. Canarie (Alexis Roland-Manuel)
4. Sarabande (Germaine Tailleferre^{*})
5. Matelote provençale (Francis Poulenc^{*})
6. Variation (Henri Sauguet)
7. Écossaise (Georges Auric^{*})

^{*}Member of the group Les Six

The work was first performed on 30 July 1952 at the Aix-en-Provence Festival, by the Orchestre de la Société des Concerts du Conservatoire, under conductor Hans Rosbaud.

Benjamin Britten attended the premiere, and it gave him the idea of commissioning several composers to contribute to a set of Variations on an Elizabethan Theme to celebrate the forthcoming coronation of Elizabeth II, for which he was also writing his opera Gloriana.

== Adaptations ==
In 1966, a ballet, La Guirlande de Campra, was choreographed by John Taras and presented by New York City Ballet.
