= Nikolay Sokolov (composer) =

Russian composer

Nikolay Alexandrovich Sokolov (Russian: Никола́й Алекса́ндрович Соколо́в; 26 March [O.S. 14 March] 1859 – 27 March 1922) was a Russian composer of classical music and a member of the circle that grew around the publisher Mitrofan Belyayev.

== Career ==
Sokolov was born in Saint Petersburg in 1859. A student of Nikolai Rimsky-Korsakov, he taught Alexander Tcherepnin, Dmitri Shostakovich and Yuri Shaporin at the Saint Petersburg Conservatory.

He was the posthumous dedicatee of Shostakovich's Theme and Variations in B-flat major for orchestra, Op. 3.

Sokolov's recorded works include his contributions to several collaborative projects of the "Belyayev circle", including the set of character pieces for string quartet known as Les Vendredis as well as a set of variations for piano and orchestra on a Russian theme.

Other works include a Quintet, Op. 3, also arranged for string orchestra as a serenade; final chorus from Aleksey Konstantinovich Tolstoy's Don Juan, Op. 5; choruses for women's voices, Op. 12 (published 1892); piano variations, Op. 25; Variations on a popular Russian theme for string quartet (published 1899). There are also three string quartets, in F major, A major and D minor, and a string trio in D minor, his Op. 45 (published in 1916). All of these were published by Belyayev's firm.

It is possible that, when Sergei Diaghilev was looking for a composer for The Firebird, Sokolov was considered before Igor Stravinsky was settled on.

He died in Petrograd in 1922, aged 63.

== Selected worklist ==
- Orchestral music
  - Elegie, for orchestra (pub. 1888)
  - Four pieces for strings, Op. 18
  - Second Serenade for strings, Op. 23
  - Caressante polka, for string orchestra, Op. 38.
  - Divertissement, Op. 42
  - Music for Shakespeare's The Winter's Tale, for large orchestra, Op. 44
  - Ballet 'Les Cygnes Sauvages' Op.40 Suite for Orchestra Belaieff 1902 pl.#2353-2355
- String quartets
  - No. 1 in F major, Op. 7
  - No. 2 in A major, Op. 14
  - No. 3 in D minor, Op. 20
- Other chamber music, and piano music.
  - Elegie, for violin with piano accompaniment, Op. 17.
  - Variations for piano, Op. 25.
  - String trio in D minor, Op. 45
  - Romance for Cello and Piano, Op. 19
- Vocal music
  - Four lieder from Op. 1
  - Three-part chorus "Printemps"
  - Autumn for women's chorus and piano
  - Four romances on words of Apollon Korinfsky with piano accompaniment, Op. 24 (pub. 1895)
  - Choruses for Men's Voices, Op. 6
  - Choruses for Men's Voices, Op. 15

== Books ==
- Sokolov, N. Prakticheskoe rukovodstvo k izucheniiu akkordov, vkhodiashchikh v kurs II-go klassa solfedzhio Petrogradskoi konservatorii. 1897, reprinted 1916. Izd. M.P. Bieliaeva. (18 pages.)
- Sokolov, N. Imitatsii na cantus firmus; posobie pri izuchenii kontrapunkta strogogo stilia. Leningrad: Izd. Gosudarstvennoi konservatorii. 1928. (62 pages, of which pages 23–62 are score.)
