= Camille, reine des Volsques =

Opera composed by André Campra

Camille, reine des Volsques (Camilla, Queen of the Volsci) is an opera by the French composer André Campra, first performed at the Académie Royale de Musique (the Paris Opera) on 9 November 1717. It takes the form of a tragédie en musique in a prologue and five acts. The libretto, by Antoine Danchet, is based on Virgil's Aeneid and concerns the Volscian queen Camilla.

Motives from this opera were the inspiration for the 1952 composition La Guirlande de Campra, a collaboration between Georges Auric, Arthur Honegger, Francis Poulenc and Germaine Tailleferre from the group Les Six, and by Daniel Lesur, Alexis Roland-Manuel and Henri Sauguet. That work was then used for a 1966 ballet of the same name by John Taras.
