= La Guirlande de Campra (ballet) =

La Guirlande de Campra is a ballet made at the New York City Ballet by ballet master John Taras to eponymous 1952 music composed by Georges Auric, Arthur Honegger, Daniel-Lesur, Alexis Roland-Manuel, Francis Poulenc, Henri Sauguet and Germaine Tailleferre, after a theme from André Campra's 1717 opera Camille, reine des Volsques. The premiere took place December 1, 1966 at the New York State Theater, Lincoln Center.

== Original cast ==
- Violette Verdy
- Mimi Paul
- Marnee Morris
- Patricia Neary
- Melissa Hayden
- Arthur Mitchell

== Reviews ==
- "Dance: La guirlande de Campra by John Taras; A Good Performance of a Weak Ballet" by Clive Barnes, The New York Times, December 2, 1966
