= Cadet Rousselle =

French song

The melody of Cadet Rousselle

"Cadet Rousselle" was a popular French song that satirized a French bailiff by the name of Guillaume (William) Rousselle, widely known as Cadet Rousselle.

== The man ==
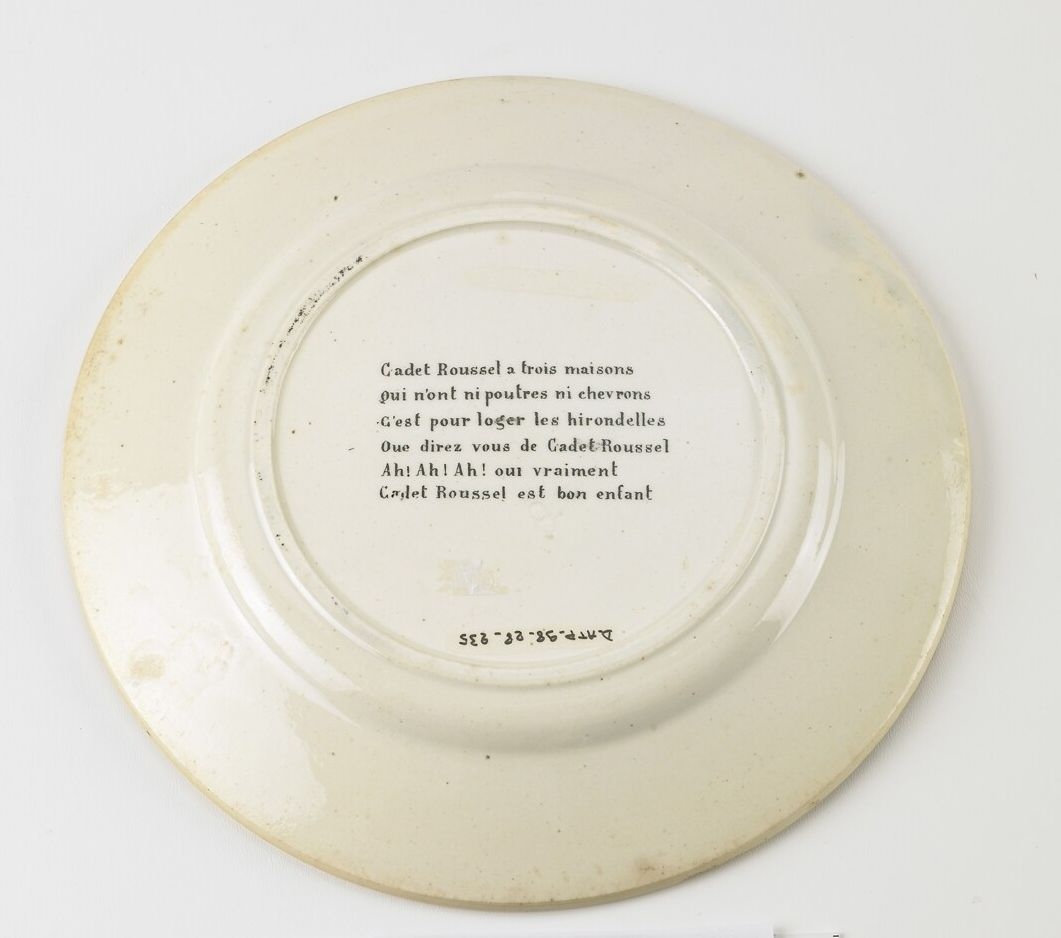
Lyrics to Cadet Rousselle on the back of a 19th-century dinner plate from France

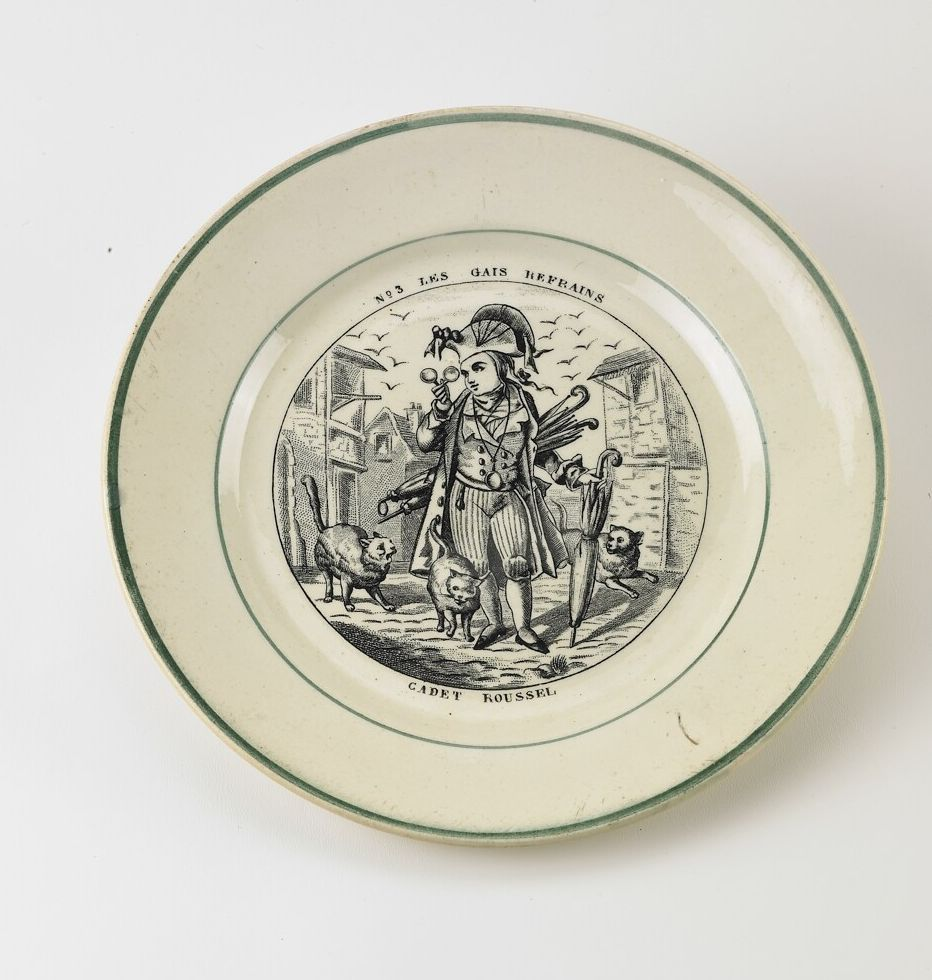
Other side of the plate

Guillaume Rousselle was born in Orgelet, Jura on April 30, 1743, and died in Auxerre on January 28, 1807. In his 1945 book on Cadet Rousselle, Pierre Pinsseau details Rousselle's life in Auxerre beginning with his 1783 arrival in the town. The circumstances and exact date of Guillaume Rousselle's arrival in Auxerre are unknown, but it is believed to be 1763, one year after the death of his father. His first jobs included work as a domestic servant and lackey and later he worked as a bailiff's clerk.

On March 15, 1780, he petitioned the Lieutenant General of the Bailiwick of Auxerre for the position of head bailiff of the Bailiwick and Courts of Auxerre. His eligibility for this position was confirmed by his Majesty on March 8, 1780, which shows that he had been living in the town for several years.

His appointment in 1780 as a Court bailiff provided sufficient income to allow the purchase of a small house, which had an old porch on top of which he added a construction in the shape of a narrow loggia. He was seen as a jovial bon vivant, a little eccentric, but he enjoyed the sympathy of his fellow citizens.

In Auxerre, he was seen as "good revolutionary", perhaps a little too much so. After a stint in prison between 1794 and 1795, he carefully limited his activities to his official duties as bailiff.

In his 1874 novel Ninety-Three, Victor Hugo has Danton mock Robespierre for monopolizing the floor at the Convention for two hours:

Cadet Rousselle made speeches
That are not long when they are short.

== The song ==
In 1792, Gaspard de Chenu, a writer of spiritual and satirical songs, wrote the song "Cadet Rousselle" to the tune of a song about Jean de Nivelle. The song spread beyond the limits of the city when volunteers from Auxerre introduced it to the Armée du Nord. It later spread through all levels of society.

In 1919 John Ireland, Arnold Bax, Frank Bridge and Eugene Goossens wrote Variations on "Cadet Roussel" as an encore piece for voice and piano. In 1930 Goossens arranged this composite work for small orchestra, publishing it as his Op. 40. and the piece was first performed at the Savoy Theatre in London on 28 February 1932 under the auspices of The Camargo Society.

Cadet Rouselle was also used by Tchaikovsky in his ballet The Nutcracker, along with other children's songs.

== Films ==
Cadet Rousselle was the title of a 1954 French film by André Hunebelle. It is a freely interpreted film that based itself on the song and the recurrence of the number 3 in many aspects of the character's adventures.

In 1946, the National Film Board of Canada released the award-winning animated short film Cadet Rousselle, produced by James Beveridge, directed by animator George Dunning and animated by Dunning and Colin Low.

== Lyrics of the song Cadet Rousselle, by Gaspard de Chenu ==
Cadet Rousselle has three houses,
Cadet Rousselle has three houses,
They have not beams or rafters.
They have not beams or rafters.
They give lodging to the swallows,
What do you say about Cadet Rousselle?
Ah! Ah! Ah! Yes, truly,
Cadet Rousselle is a good boy! ..

Cadet Rousselle has three outfits,
Cadet Rousselle has three outfits,
Two in yellow, the other of gray paper,
Two in yellow, the other of gray paper,
He wears it when it's freezing,
Or when it rains or when it hails ...
Ah! Ah! Ah! Yes, truly,
Cadet Rousselle is a good boy! ..

Cadet Rousselle has three hats,
Cadet Rousselle has three hats,
Two are round and not beautiful,
Two are round and not beautiful,
The third has two pointed cones,
From his head, it takes its form ...
Ah! Ah! Ah! Yes, truly,
Cadet Rousselle is a good boy! ..

Cadet Rousselle has three lovely eyes,
Cadet Rousselle has three lovely eyes,
One looks to Caen, the other to Bayeux,
One looks to Caen, the other to Bayeux,
Because his vision is not clear,
The third eye is his monocle.
Ah! Ah! Ah! Yes, truly,
Cadet Rousselle is a good boy! ..

Cadet Rousselle has a sword,
Cadet Rousselle has a sword,
Very long, but totally rusted,
Very long, but totally rusted,
He says it does not look for quarrels
It's only for sparrows and swallows.
Ah! Ah! Ah! Yes, truly,
Cadet Rousselle is a good boy! ..

Cadet Rousselle has three shoes,
Cadet Rousselle has three shoes,
He puts two on his two feet,
He puts two on his two feet,
The third does not tread the ground,
He uses it to fit his beautiful ...
Ah! Ah! Ah! Yes, truly,
Cadet Rousselle is a good boy! ..

Cadet Rousselle has three hairs,
Cadet Rousselle has three hairs,
Two for the face, one for the tail,
Two for the face, one for the tail,
And when he sees his mistress,
He puts all three into a braid.
Ah! Ah! Ah! Yes, truly,
Cadet Rousselle is a good boy! ..

Cadet Rousselle has three sons,
Cadet Rousselle has three sons,
One is a robber, another is lazy,
One is a robber, another is lazy,
The third is a little trickster,
In which he resembles Cadet Rousselle.
Ah! Ah! Ah! Yes, truly,
Cadet Rousselle is a good boy! ..

Cadet Rousselle has three big dogs,
Cadet Rousselle has three big dogs,
One hunts hares, the other hunts rabbits,
One hunts hares, the other hunts rabbits,
The third flees when it is called,
Just like the dog of Jean de Nivelle.
Ah! Ah! Ah! Yes, truly,
Cadet Rousselle is a good boy! ..

Cadet Rousselle has three beautiful cats,
Cadet Rousselle has three beautiful cats,
Who do not ever catch rats;
Who do not ever catch rats;
The third does not give a fig,
It takes to the attic and hides in the dark.
Ah! Ah! Ah! Yes, truly,
Cadet Rousselle is a good boy! ..

Cadet Rousselle has married
Cadet Rousselle has married
His three girls in three districts,
His three girls in three districts,
The first two are less than beautiful,
The third has no brains.
Ah! Ah! Ah! Yes, truly,
Cadet Rousselle is a good boy! ..

Cadet Rousselle has three dollars,
Cadet Rousselle has three dollars,
To pay his creditors;
To pay his creditors;
Once he had shown his resources,
He tightened them in his purse.
Ah! Ah! Ah! Yes, truly,
Cadet Rousselle is a good boy! ..

Cadet Rousselle became an actor,
Cadet Rousselle became an actor,
As Chénier became an author,
As Chénier became an author,
When at the cafe, he plays a role,
The blind find it very droll.
Ah! Ah! Ah! Yes, truly,
Cadet Rousselle is a good boy! ..

Cadet Rousselle cannot die,
Cadet Rousselle cannot die,
Because, before he walks no more,
Because, before he walks no more,
They say he has to learn his letters,
So he can make himself his epitaph.
Ah! Ah! Ah! Yes, truly,
Cadet Rousselle is a good boy!
