= Chronological list of Austrian classical composers =

The following is a chronological list of Austrian classical composers: that is, those who live in, work in, or are citizens of Austria.

== Medieval ==
- Walther von der Vogelweide (c.1170–c.1230)

== Renaissance ==
- Paul Hofhaimer (1459–1537)
- Petrus Tritonius (1465–c.1525)
- Arnold von Bruck (c.1500–1554)
- Jacob Regnart (1540/45–1599)
- Jacobus Gallus (1550–1591)
- Blasius Ammon (1558–1590)

== Baroque ==
- Johann Stadlmayr (c.1575/80–1648)
- Johannes Hieronymus Kapsberger (c.1580–1651)
- Antonio Bertali (1605–1669)
- Alberich Mazak (1607–1661)
- Johann Heinrich Schmelzer (1620/23–1680)
- Antonio Draghi (1634–1700)
- Leopold I, Holy Roman Emperor (1640–1705)
- Heinrich Ignaz Franz Biber (1644–1704)
- Georg Muffat (1653–1704)
- Georg Reutter (1656–1738)
- Johann Joseph Fux (c.1660–1741)
- Johann Joseph Vilsmayr (1663–1722)
- Benedict Anton Aufschnaiter (1665–1742)
- Joseph Balthasar Hochreither (1669–1731)
- Johann Georg Reinhardt (1676–1742)
- Johann Baptist Peyer (c.1678–1733)
- Gottlieb Muffat (1690–1770)
- Gregor Werner (1693–1766)
- Leopold Strach (1699–1755)
- Johann Ernst Eberlin (1702–1762)
- Carl Georg Reutter (1708–1772)

== Classical era ==
- Joseph Riepel (1709–1782)
- Franz Xaver Richter (1709–1789)
- Vigilius Blasius Faitelli (1710–1768)
- Ignaz Jacob Holzbauer (1711–1783)
- Josephus Johannes Baptizta Bon (1711–1788)
- Georg Christoph Wagenseil (1715–1777)
- Georg Matthias Monn (1717–1750)
- Wenzel Raimund Birck (1718–1763)
- Leopold Mozart (1719–1787)
- Joseph Friebert (1724–1799)
- Johann Christoph Mann (1726–1782)
- Karl Kohaut (1726–1784)
- Josef Starzer (1726–1787)
- Joseph Anton Steffan (1726–1797)
- Franz Aspelmayr (1728–1786)
- Franz Kreibich (1728–1797)
- Franz Joseph Aumann (1728–1797)
- Florian Johann Deller (1729–1773)
- Florian Leopold Gassmann (1729–1774)
- Anton Cajetan Adlgasser (1729–1777)
- Georg Pasterwitz (1730–1803)
- Joseph Haydn (1732–1809)
- Gottfried van Swieten (1733–1803)
- Christoph Sonnleithner (1734–1786)
- Karl von Ordóñez (1734–1786)
- Johann Georg Albrechtsberger (1736–1809)
- Michael Haydn (1737–1806)
- Franz Schneider (1737–1812)
- Leopold Hoffman (1738–1793)
- Carl Ditters von Dittersdorf (1739–1799)
- Johann Baptist Wanhal (1739–1813)
- Edmund Angerer (1740–1794)
- Anton Zimmermann (1741–1781)
- Marianne von Martinez (1744–1812)
- Ignaz Umlauf (1746–1796)
- Franz Paul Rigler (1747–1796)
- Stefan Paluselli (1748–1805)
- Maximilian Johann Karl Stadler (1748–1833)
- Johannes Matthias Sperger (1750–1812)
- Antonio Salieri (1750–1825)
- Ferdinand August Kauer (1751–1831)
- Johann Baptist Holzer (1753–1818)
- Johann Baptist Schenk (1753–1836)
- Franz Anton Hoffmeister (1754–1812)
- Wolfgang Amadeus Mozart (1756–1791)
- Franz Grill (1756–1793)
- Paul Wranitzky (1756–1808)
- Anton Teyber (1756–1822)
- Ignaz Pleyel (1757–1831)
- Franz Teyber (1758–1810)
- Josepha Barbara Auernhammer (1758–1820)
- Joseph Gelinek (1758–1825)
- Benedikt Schack (1758–1826)
- Maria Theresa von Paradis (1759–1824)
- Franz Krommer (1759–1831)
- Wenzel Müller (1759–1835)
- Anton Wranitzky (1761–1820)
- Jakob Haibel (1762–1826)
- Anna von Schaden (1763–1834)
- Adalbert Gyrowetz (1763–1850)
- Franz Xaver Gerl (1764–1827)
- Anton Eberl (1765–1807)
- Joseph Leopold Eybler (1765–1846)
- Franz Xaver Süssmayr (1766–1803)
- Joseph Weigl (1766–1846)
- Leonhard von Call (1767–1815)
- Wenzel Müller (1767–1835)
- Johann Baptist Henneberg (1768–1822)
- Matthäus Stegmayer (1771–1820)
- Antonio Casimir Cartellieri (1772–1807)
- Joseph Wölfl (1773–1812)
- Nikolaus von Krufft (1779–1818)

== Romantic ==
- Johann Georg Lickl (1769–1843)
- Ludwig van Beethoven (1770–1827)
- Josef Triebensee (1772–1846)
- Joseph Woelfl (1773–1812)
- Wenzel Thomas Matiegka (1773–1830)
- Ignaz von Seyfried (1776–1841)
- Franz Weiss (1778–1830)
- Johann Nepomuk Hummel (1778–1837)
- Johann Baptist Gänsbacher (1778–1844)
- Sigismond von Neukomm (1778–1858)
- Franz Clement (1780–1842)
- Michael Umlauf (1781–1842)
- Anton Diabelli (1781–1858)
- Wenzel Robert von Gallenberg (1783–1839)
- Tobias Haslinger (1787–1842)
- Franz Xaver Gruber (1787–1863)
- Joseph Mayseder (1789–1863)
- Ignaz Aßmayer (1790–1862)
- Franz Xaver Mozart (1791–1844)
- Carl Czerny (1791–1857)
- Anselm Hüttenbrenner (1794–1868)
- Franz Schubert (1797–1828)
- Josef Dessauer (1798–1876)
- Joseph Lanner (1801–1843)
- Henri Herz (1802–1888)
- Johann Baptist Krall (1803–1883)
- Johann Strauss I (1804–1849)
- Johann Kaspar Mertz (1806–1856)
- Anton Emil Titl (1809–1882)
- Leopoldine Blahetka (1809–1885)
- Heinrich Wilhelm Ernst (1812–1865)
- Sigismond Thalberg (1812–1871)
- August Wilhelm Ambros (1816–1876)
- Franz Krenn (1816–1897)
- Franz von Suppé (1819–1895)
- Franz Doppler (1821–1883)
- Anton Bruckner (1824–1896)
- Johann Strauss II (1825–1899)
- Ludwig Minkus (1826–1917)
- Josef Strauss (1827–1870)
- Georg Hellmesberger Jr. (1830–1852)
- Karl Goldmark (1830–1915)
- Theodor Leschetizky (1830–1915)
- Johann von Herbeck (1831–1877)
- Johannes Brahms (1833-1897)
- August Lanner (1835–1855)
- Eduard Strauss (1835–1916)
- Carl Zeller (1842–1898)
- Johann Nepomuk Fuchs (1842–1899)
- Carl Millöcker (1842–1899)
- Josef Labor (1842–1924)
- Heinrich von Herzogenberg (1843–1900)
- Carl Michael Ziehrer (1843–1922)
- Hermann Grädener (1844–1929)
- Ignaz Brüll (1846–1907)
- Robert Fuchs (1847–1927)
- Ludvig Schytte (1848–1909)
- Richard Heuberger (1850–1914)
- Josef Bayer (1852–1913)
- Alfred Grünfeld (1852–1924)
- Johann Pehel (1852–1926)
- Elkan Bauer (1852–1942)
- Hugo Reinhold (1854–1935)
- Joseph Hellmesberger Jr. (1855–1907)
- Felix Mottl (1856–1911)
- Eusebius Mandyczewski (1857–1929)
- Wilhelm Kienzl (1857–1941)
- Mathilde Kralik (1857–1944)
- Hans Rott (1858–1884)
- Hugo Wolf (1860–1903)
- Gustav Mahler (1860–1911)
- Emil von Reznicek (1860–1945)
- Ludwig Thuille (1861–1907)
- Felix Weingartner (1863–1942)
- Johann Strauss III (1866–1939)
- Jan Brandts Buys (1868–1933)
- Carl Frühling (1868–1937)
- Johanna Müller-Hermann (1868–1941)
- Leo Fall (1873–1925)

== Modern/Contemporary ==
- Franz Lehár (1870–1948)
- Oscar Straus (1870–1954)
- Alexander von Zemlinsky (1871–1942)
- Siegmund von Hausegger (1872–1948)
- Walter Rabl (1873–1940)
- Julius Bittner (1874–1939)
- Franz Schmidt (1874–1939)
- Arnold Schoenberg (1874–1951)
- Fritz Kreisler (1875–1962)
- Sergei Bortkiewicz (1877–1952)
- Franz Schreker (1878–1934)
- Alma Mahler (1879–1964)
- Robert Stolz (1880–1975)
- Karl Weigl (1881–1949)
- Artur Schnabel (1882–1951)
- Joseph Marx (1882–1964)
- Anton Webern (1883–1945)
- Josef Matthias Hauer (1883–1959)
- Ralph Benatzky (1884–1957)
- Alban Berg (1885–1935)
- Egon Wellesz (1885–1974)
- Ernst Toch (1887–1964)
- Max Steiner (1888–1971)
- Hans Gál (1890–1987)
- Marcel Tyberg (1891–1944)
- Fritz Heinrich Klein (1892–1977)
- Paul Amadeus Pisk (1893–1990)
- Wilhelm Grosz (1894–1939)
- Karol Rathaus (1895–1954)
- Johann Nepomuk David (1895–1977)
- Nico Dostal (1895–1981)
- Jaromír Weinberger (1896–1967)
- Maria Bach (1896–1978)
- Erich Wolfgang Korngold (1897–1957)
- Viktor Ullmann (1898–1944)
- Hanns Eisler (1898–1962)
- Grete von Zieritz (1899–2001)
- Ernst Krenek (1900–1991)
- Hanns Jelinek (1901–1969)
- Hans Erich Apostel (1901–1972)
- Jenő Takács (1902–2005)
- Erich Zeisl (1905–1959)
- Theodor Berger (1905–1992)
- Cesar Bresgen (1913–1988)
- Karl Schiske (1916–1969)
- Georg Tintner (1917–1999)
- Gottfried von Einem (1918–1996)
- Roman Haubenstock-Ramati (1919–1994)
- Ernest Gold (1921–1999)
- György Ligeti (1923–2006)
- Robert Starer (1924–2001)
- Joseph Horovitz (1926–2022)
- Friedrich Cerha (1926–2023)
- Paul Angerer (1927–2017)
- Michael Gielen (1927–2019)
- Luna Alcalay (1928–2012)
- René Clemencic (1928–2022)
- Friedrich Gulda (1930–2000)
- Nancy Van de Vate (1930–2023)
- Gerhard Rühm (born 1930)
- Kurt Schwertsik (born 1935)
- Erich Urbanner (born 1936)
- Gösta Neuwirth (born 1937)
- Hermann Nitsch (1938–2022)
- Georg Friedrich Haas (born 1953)
- Beat Furrer (born 1954)
- Bernard Lang (born 1957)
- Thomas Larcher (born 1963)
- Lukas Ligeti (born 1965)
- Olga Neuwirth (born 1968)
- Klaus Lang (born 1971)
