= List of Austrian composers =

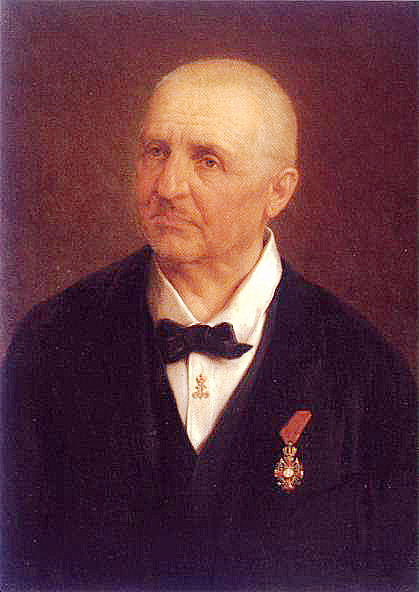
Anton Bruckner

Joseph Haydn

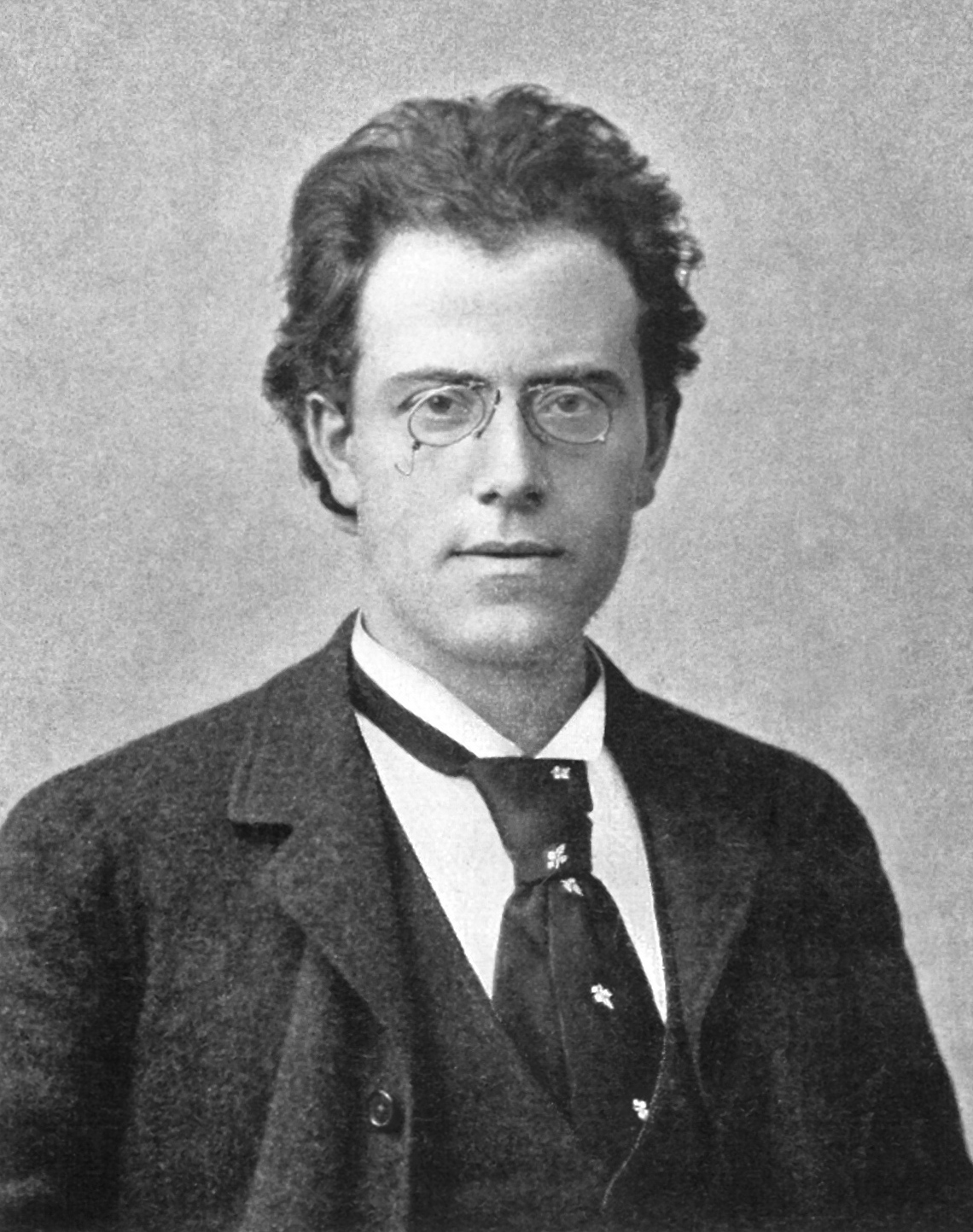
Gustav Mahler

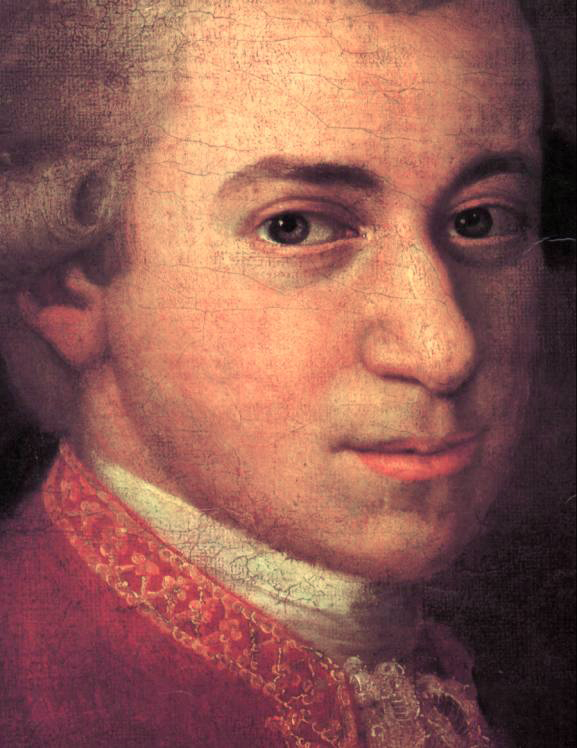
Wolfgang Amadeus Mozart

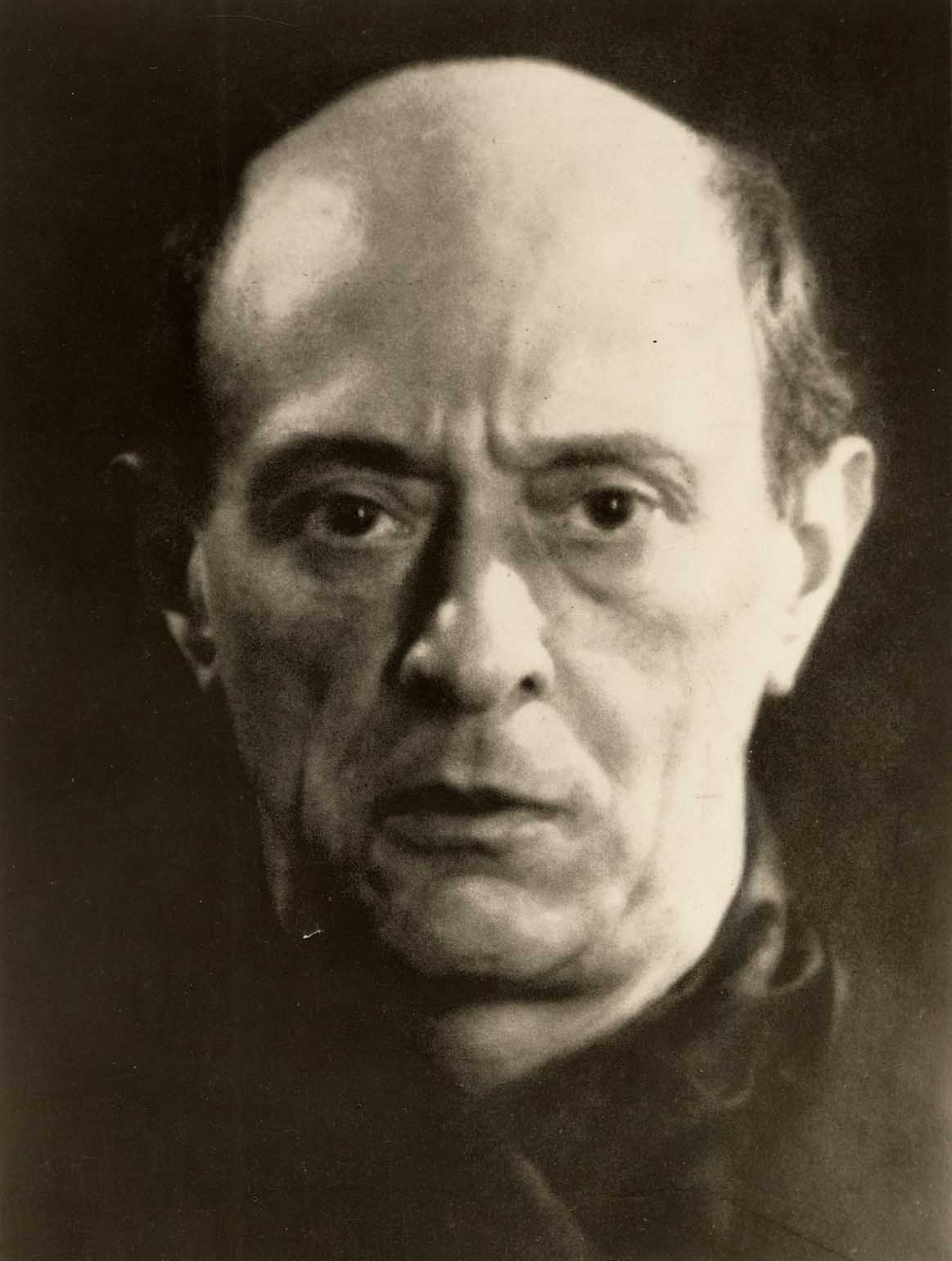
Arnold Schoenberg

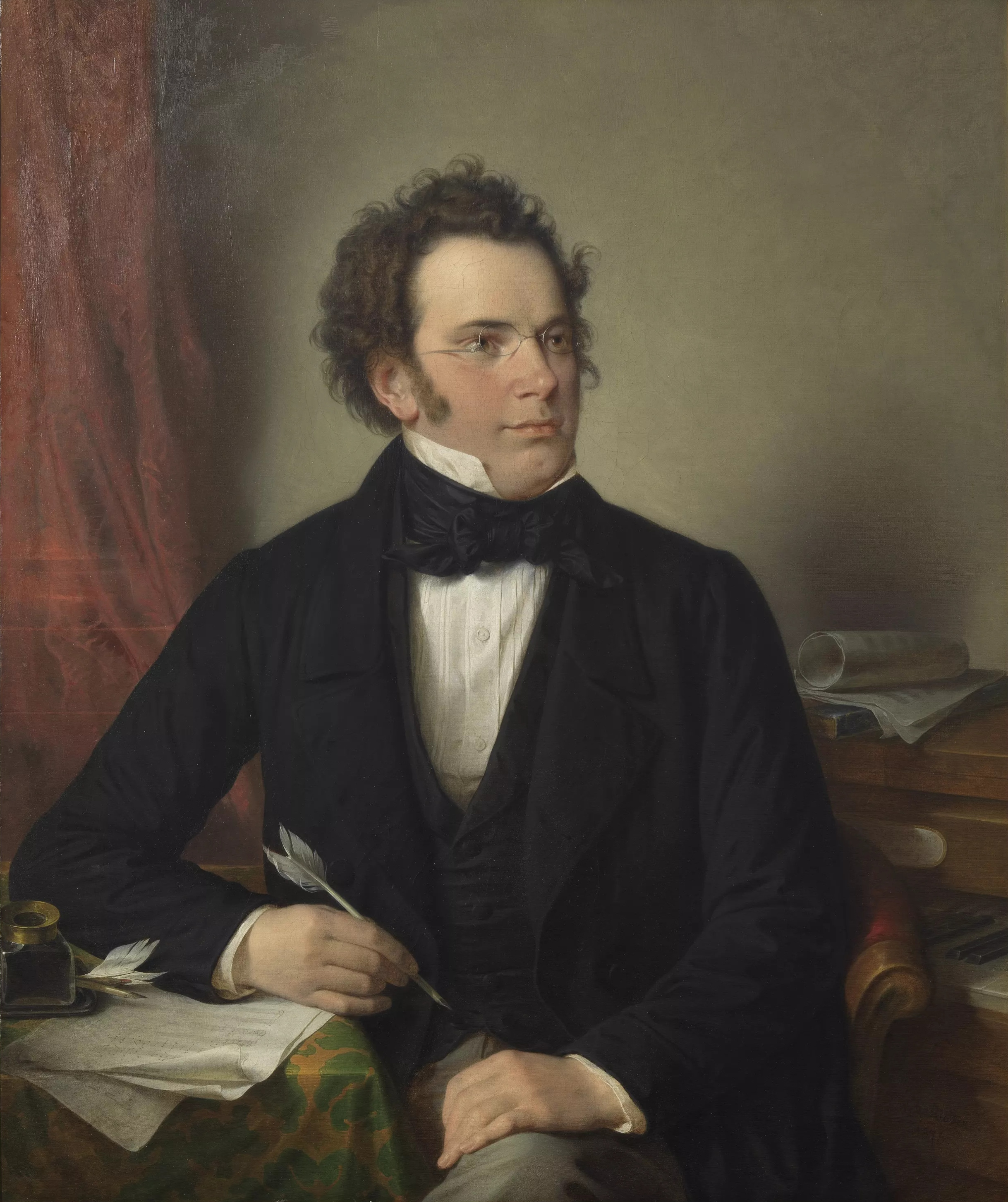
Franz Schubert

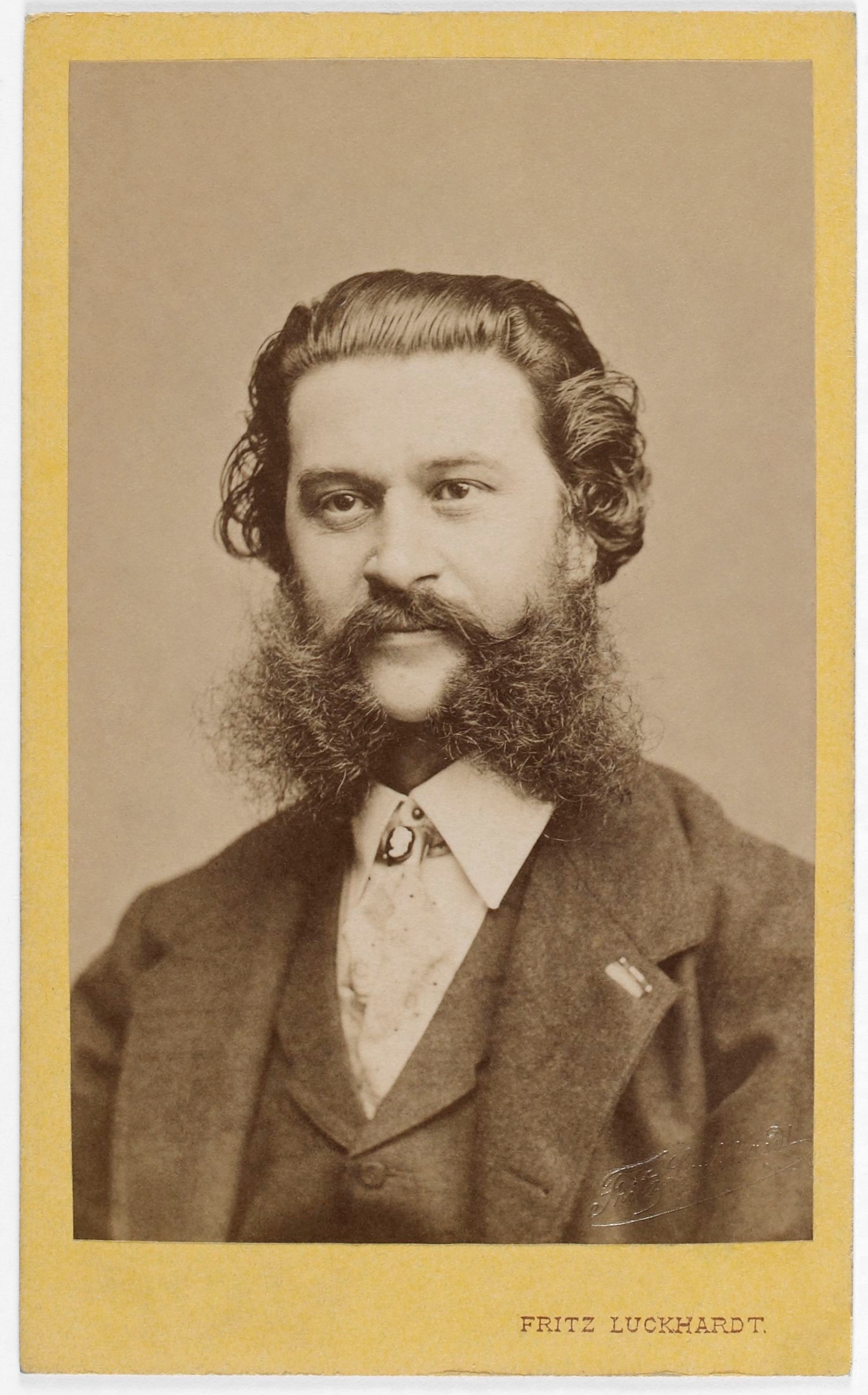
Johann Strauss II

This is an alphabetical list of Austrian composers.

The portraits at right are seven of the most-prominent Austrian composers, as agreed by three published reviews.

== A – M ==
- Johann Georg Albrechtsberger (1736–1809) – Classical-era composer of preludes, fugues and sonatas for the piano
- Elkan Bauer (1852–1942) – 20th-century composer; wrote popular waltzes
- Alban Berg (1885–1935) – 20th-century composer; member of the Second Viennese School
- Anton Bruckner (1824–1896) – composer of nine large-scale symphonies, sacred works and organ works; church organist
- Antonio Casimir Cartellieri (1772–1807)
- Franz Clement (1780–1842), full name Franz Joseph Clement
- Carl Czerny (1791–1857) – composer; student of Ludwig van Beethoven; known for his piano exercises and pedagogy
- Anton Diabelli (1781–1858), also Antonio
- Carl Ditters von Dittersdorf (1739–1799) – Classical-era composer and violinist
- Nico Dostal (1895–1981) – composer, arranger, Kapellmeister
- Anton Eberl (1765–1807)
- Joseph Leopold Eybler (1765–1846)
- Gisela Frankl (1860–1935)
- Robert Fuchs (1847–1927)
- Johann Fux (1660–1741) – composer, influential theorist on Renaissance counterpoint
- Heinz Karl Gruber (born 1943) – composer, bassist and singer
- Siegmund von Hausegger (1872–1948)
- Georg Friedrich Haas (born 1953) – composer of contemporary classical music
- Joseph Haydn (1732–1809) – Classical-era composer; composed 104 symphonies, as well as numerous string quartets and other chamber music, operas and sacred works
- Michael Haydn (1737–1806) – Classical-era composer; younger brother of Joseph Haydn
- Leopold Hoffman (1738–1793) – Classical-era composer
- Johann Nepomuk Hummel (1778–1837) – composer and pianist; music bridged the Classical and Romantic periods
- Erich Kleiber (1890–1956)
- Fritz Kreisler (1875–1962) – 20th-century violinist and composer
- Nikolaus von Krufft (1779–1818) – Classical composer of piano music and lieder
- Josef Labor (1842–1924)
- August Lanner (1835–1855), born Augustin Lanner
- Joseph Franz Karl Lanner (1801–1843) – early-Romantic-era dance-music composer; one-time colleague of Johann Strauss I
- Bruno Liberda (born 1953) – composer; student of Roman Haubenstock-Ramati; contemporary classical music; first electronic music ever to be performed in the Vienna State Opera
- Franz Liszt (1811-1886)
- Gustav Mahler (1860–1911) – late-Romantic composer of large-scale and sometimes programmatic symphonies; born in Bohemia in a German-speaking community, a subject of the Habsburg Empire; music director in Vienna in the 1890s and 1900s
- Marianna Martines (1744–1812) – composer, singer and pianist
- Alois Melichar (1896–1976) – composer, arranger and conductor
- Jacques de Menasce (1905–1960) – became an American in 1941
- Franz Xaver Wolfgang Mozart (1791–1844) – son of Wolfgang Amadeus Mozart
- Leopold Mozart (1719–1787) – Classical-era composer, violinist, author of influential treatise on playing the violin
- Wolfgang Amadeus Mozart (1756–1791) – Classical-era composer of operas, piano concertos, chamber music, symphonies and sacred works; son of Leopold Mozart

== N – Z ==
- Sigismund von Neukomm (1778–1858) – born Sigismond Neukomm, after ennoblement as a knight Sigismund Ritter von Neukomm
- Karl von Ordóñez (1734–1786) – also Carlo or Carl d'Ordonetz, Ordonnetz, d'Ordóñez, d'Ordonez, Ordoniz
- Kurt Overhoff (1902–1986) – composer and conductor
- Leonhard Päminger (1495–1567) – also Paminger and Panninger
- Maria Theresa von Paradis (1759–1824) – Classical-era composer; inspiration for the Piano Concerto No. 18 in B-flat major by Wolfgang Amadeus Mozart
- Johann Baptist Peyer (c.1678–1733) – organist and composer
- Ignace Joseph Pleyel (1757 – 1831)
- Walter Rabl (1873–1940) – Viennese composer, conductor and teacher of vocal music
- Carl Georg Reutter (1708–1772) – Baroque-era court composer
- Emil von Reznicek (1860–1945) – born Emil Nikolaus Joseph, Freiherr von Reznicek
- Franz Xaver Richter (1709–1789) – Czech František, French François Xavier
- Jakob Schgraffer (1799-1859)
- Johann Heinrich Schmelzer (1623–1680) – composer and violinist; first German-speaking composer to publish solo violin and b.c. sonatas in the Italian style (Sonatae unarum fidium seu a violino solo, 1664)
- Franz Schmidt (1874–1939) – 20th-century composer of symphonies and operas, cellist and pianist
- Franz Schneider (1737–1812), composer and organist known best for his 47 masses
- Arnold Schoenberg (1874–1951) – 20th-century modernist composer; founder of the Second Viennese School; developer of the twelve-tone technique
- Franz Schubert (1797–1828) – Classical/Romantic composer; regarded as the first significant lieder writer; composer of many instrumental works as well
- Robert Stolz (1880–1975) – conductor and composer of operettas, film music and songs
- Eduard Strauss (1835–1916) – dance-music composer; brother of Johann Strauss II
- Johann Strauss I (1804–1849) – early-Romantic-era dance-music composer
- Johann Strauss II (1825–1899) – Romantic-era composer of waltzes and polkas, wrote The Blue Danube waltz
- Josef Strauss (1827–1870) – dance-music composer; brother of Johann Strauss II
- Franz von Suppé (1819–1895) – composer of light opera
- Franz Xaver Süssmayr (1766–1803) – Classical-era composer; student of Wolfgang Amadeus Mozart
- Sigismond Thalberg (1812–1871)
- Ludwig Thuille (1861–1907)
- Joseph Umstatt (1711–1762)
- Johann Joseph Vilsmayr (1663–1722)
- Georg Christoph Wagenseil (1715–1777) – Classical-era composer, harpsichordist, and organist
- Anton Webern (1883–1945) – 20th-century composer, member of the Second Viennese School; used the twelve-tone technique in addition to the style known as serialism
- Egon Joseph Wellesz (1885–1974) – 20th-century composer, teacher, musicologist; pupil of Arnold Schoenberg and student of Byzantine music
- Erich Zeisl (1905–1959) – Modernist Jewish Viennese composer of symphonies, ballets, choral music, operas, and film scores; fled Nazis for America in 1938
- Karl Michael Ziehrer (1843–1922), also spelled as Carl

== See also ==
- Chronological list of Austrian classical composers
- List of Austrians in music
- List of German composers
