= The Blue Danube =

1866 waltz by Johann Strauss II

- Waltz by Johann Strauss II
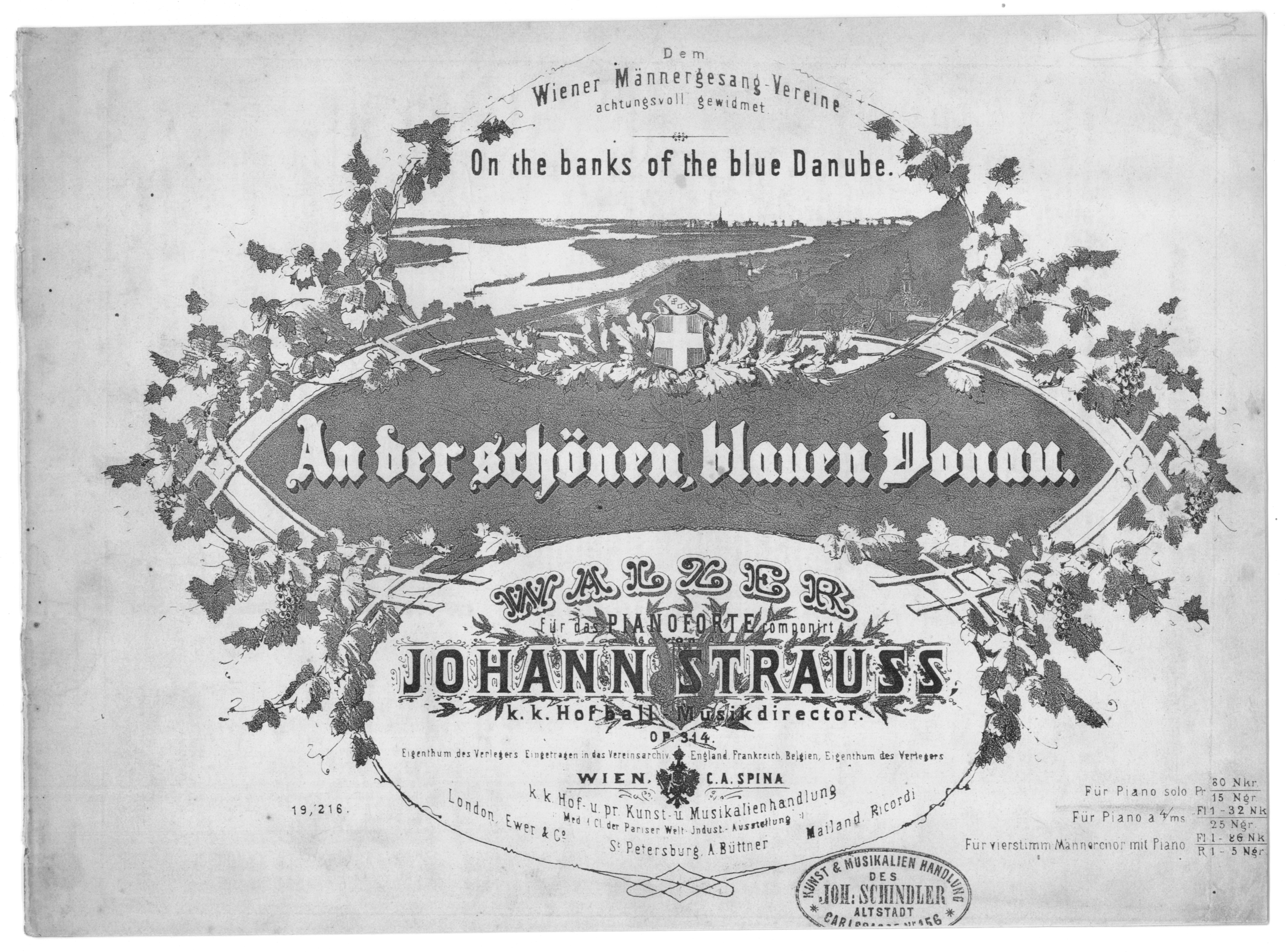
- "The Blue Danube" (1867)
- Year: 1866

Premiere
- Date: 15 February 1867; 159 years ago
- Location: Diana Baths, Vienna
- Conductor: Rudolf Weinwurm

"The Blue Danube" (German: An der schönen blauen Donau, lit. 'By the Beautiful Blue Danube', Op. 314) is a waltz by the Austrian composer Johann Strauss II, composed in 1866. Originally performed on 15 February 1867 at a concert of the Wiener Männergesang-Verein (Vienna Men's Choral Association), it has been one of the most consistently popular pieces of music in the classical repertoire. Its initial performance was considered only a mild success, however, and Strauss is reputed to have said, "The devil take the waltz, my only regret is for the coda—I wish that had been a success!"

After the original music was written, the words were added by the Choral Association's poet, Joseph Weyl. Strauss later added more music, and Weyl needed to change some of the words. Strauss adapted it into a purely orchestral version for the 1867 Paris World's Fair, and it became a great success in this form. The instrumental version is by far the most commonly performed today. An alternate text was written by Franz von Gernerth, "Donau so blau" (Danube so blue). "The Blue Danube" premiered in the United States in its instrumental version on 1 July 1867 in New York, and in the UK in its choral version on 21 September 1867 in London at the promenade concerts at Covent Garden.

When Strauss's stepdaughter, Alice von Meyszner-Strauss, asked the composer Johannes Brahms to sign her autograph-fan, he wrote down the first bars of "The Blue Danube", but added "Leider nicht von Johannes Brahms" ("Unfortunately not by Johannes Brahms").

== Composition notes ==
"The Blue Danube"
Excerpt

"The Blue Danube"
Performed by the U.S. Marine Band

The work commences with an extended introduction in the key of A major with shimmering (tremolo) violins and a horn spelling out the familiar waltz theme, answered by staccato wind chords, in a subdued mood. It rises briefly into a loud passage but quickly dies down into the same restful nature of the opening bars. A contrasting and quick phrase in D major anticipates the waltz before three quiet downward-moving bass notes "usher in" the first principal waltz melody.

The first waltz theme is a familiar gently rising triad motif played by cellos and horns in the tonic (D major), accompanied by the harp; the Viennese waltz beat is accentuated at the end of each 3-note phrase. The Waltz 1A triumphantly ends its rounds of the motif, and waltz 1B follows in the same key; the genial mood is still apparent.

Waltz 2A glides in quietly (still in D major) before a short contrasting middle section in B♭ major. The entire section is repeated.

A more dour waltz 3A is introduced in G major before a fleeting eighth-note melodic phrase (waltz 3B). A loud Intrada (introduction) in G minor is then played. Waltz 4A starts off in a romantic mood (it is in F major) before a more joyous waltz 4B in the same key.

After another short Intrada in A, cadencing in F♯ minor, sonorous clarinets spell out the poignant melody of waltz 5A in A. Waltz 5B is the climax, punctuated by cymbal crashes. Each of these may be repeated at the discretion of the performer.

The coda recalls earlier sections (3A and 2A) before furious chords usher in a recap of the romantic Waltz 4A. The idyll is cut short as the waltz hurries back to the famous waltz theme 1A again. This statement is also cut short, however, by the final codetta: a variation of 1A is presented, featuring a dialogue with the trilling Flutes, the strings, and the quiet sounding horns, connecting to a rushing eighth-note passage in the final few bars: repeated tonic chords underlined by a snare drum roll and a bright-sounding flourish.

A typical performance lasts around 10 minutes, with the seven-minute main piece, followed by a three-minute coda.

== Instrumentation ==
The Blue Danube is scored for the following orchestra:

Woodwinds

2 Flutes (Fl. 2 doubling Piccolo)
2 Oboes
2 Clarinets in C
2 Bassoons

Brass

4 Horns in F
2 Trumpets in F
Bass trombone
Tuba

Percussion

Timpani
Bass drum
Triangle
Snare drum

Strings

Harp
Violins I, II
Violas
Violoncellos
Double basses

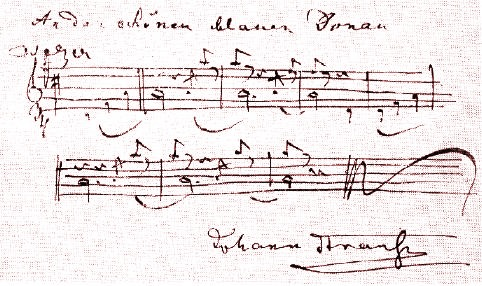
First few bars of The Blue Danube waltz, signed by the composer

== Choral version ==
The "Beautiful Blue Danube" was first written as a song for a carnival choir (for bass and tenor), with rather satirical lyrics (Austria having just lost a war with Prussia). The original title was also referring to a poem about the Danube in the poet Karl Isidor Beck's hometown, Baja in Hungary, and not in Vienna. Later Franz von Gernerth wrote new, more "official-sounding" lyrics:

Donau so blau,
so schön und blau,
durch Tal und Au
wogst ruhig du hin,
dich grüßt unser Wien,
dein silbernes Band
knüpft Land an Land,
und fröhliche Herzen schlagen
an deinem schönen Strand.

Weit vom Schwarzwald her
eilst du hin zum Meer,
spendest Segen
allerwegen,
ostwärts geht dein Lauf,
nimmst viel Brüder auf:
Bild der Einigkeit
für alle Zeit!
Alte Burgen seh'n
nieder von den Höh'n,
grüssen gerne
dich von ferne
und der Berge Kranz,
hell vom Morgenglanz,
spiegelt sich in deiner Wellen Tanz.

Die Nixen auf dem Grund,
die geben's flüsternd kund,
was Alles du erschaut,
seit dem über dir der Himmel blaut.
Drum schon in alter Zeit
ward dir manch' Lied geweiht;
und mit dem hellsten Klang
preist immer auf's Neu' dich unser Sang.

Halt' an deine Fluten bei Wien,
es liebt dich ja so sehr!
Du findest, wohin du magst zieh'n,
ein zweites Wien nicht mehr!
Hier quillt aus voller Brust
der Zauber heit'rer Lust,
und treuer, deutscher Sinn
streut aus seine Saat von hier weithin.

Du kennst wohl gut deinen Bruder, den Rhein,
an seinen Ufern wächst herrlicher Wein,
dort auch steht bei Tag und bei Nacht
die feste treue Wacht.
Doch neid' ihm nicht jene himmlische Gab',
bei dir auch strömt reicher Segen herab,
und es schützt die tapfere Hand
auch unser Heimatland!

D'rum laßt uns einig sein,
schliesst Brüder, fest den Reih'n,
froh auch in trüber Zeit,
Mut, wenn Gefahr uns dräut,
Heimat am Donaustrand,
bist uns'rer Herzen Band,
dir sei für alle Zeit
Gut und Blut geweiht!

Das Schifflein fährt auf den Wellen so sacht,
still ist die Nacht,
die Liebe nur wacht,
der Schiffer flüstert der Liebsten ins Ohr,
daß längst schon sein Herz sie erkor.
O Himmel, sei gnädig dem liebenden Paar,
schutz' vor Gefahr es immerdar!
Nun fahren dahin sie in seliger Ruh',
O Schifflein, far' immer nur zu!

Junges Blut,
frischer Muth,
o wie glücklich macht,
dem vereint ihr lacht!
Lieb und Lust
schwellt die Brust,
hat das Größte in der Welt vollbracht.

Nun singst ein fröhliches seliges Lied,
das wie Jauchzen die Lüfte durchzieht,
von den Herzen laut widerklingt
und ein festes Band um uns schlingt.

Frei und treu in Lied und Tat,
bringt ein Hoch der Wienerstadt,
die auf's Neu' erstand voller Pracht
und die Herzen erobert mit Macht.

Und zum Schluß
bringt noch einen Gruß
uns'rer lieben Donau dem herrlichen Fluß.
Was der Tag
uns auch bringen mag,
Treu' und Einigkeit
soll uns schützen zu jeglicher Zeit!

Danube so blue,
so bright and blue,
through vale and field
you flow so calm,
our Vienna greets you,
your silver stream
through all the lands
you merry the heart
with your beautiful shores.

Far from the Black Forest
you hurry to the sea
giving your blessing
to everything.
Eastward you flow,
welcoming your brothers,
A picture of peace
for all time!
Old castles looking
down from high,
greet you smiling
from their steep
and craggy hilltops,
and the mountains' vistas
mirror in your dancing waves.

The mermaids from the riverbed,
whispering as you flow by,
are heard by everything
under the blue sky above.
The noise of your passing
is a song from old times
and with the brightest sounds
your song leads you ever on.

Stop your tides at Vienna,
it loves you so much!
Whenever you might look
Another Vienna you will find nowhere!
Here pours a full chest
the charms of happy wishes,
and heartfelt German wishes
are flown away on your waters.

You know very well your brother, the Rhine,
on its banks grows a magnificent wine,
there is also, day and night,
the fixed and faithful watch.
But envy him not those heavenly gifts
by you, too, many blessings stream down
and the brave hand protects
our homeland!

Therefore let us be united,
joined brothers, in strong ranks,
happy even in troubled times;
Brave, when danger threatens us,
Home on the Danube beach,
are our hearts bound,
To thee for all time
Good and blood are consecrated!

The boat travels on the waves so softly,
quiet is the night,
love watching only
the sailor whispers in the lover's ear,
that his heart long ago she owned.
O Heaven, have mercy on the loving couple,
protect them from danger there forever!
Now they pass on in blissful repose,
Boat, sail always on!

Young blood
fresh courage,
O how happy,
it unites laughter!
Love and passion
fills the breast –
it's the greatest in the world.

Now sing a cheerful and blessed song,
the jubilation as the air permeates
echoed loudly by the heart
and tie a band around us.

Free and faithful in song and deed,
Bring a height to Vienna city
bought it on the new full glory
and conquered with force.

And in conclusion
brings even a greeting
to our love of the beautiful Danube River.
Whatever the day
may bring us,
Loyalty and unity
is to protect us all the time!
