= Franz von Gernerth =

- Born: 14 December 1821; Purkersdorf, Austrian Empire
- Died: 11 November 1900 (aged 78) Vienna, Austria-Hungary
- Occupations: Lawyer, composer and music writer

Franz von Gernerth (14 December 1821 – 11 November 1900) was an Austrian lawyer, composer and music writer.

== Life ==
Franz Elder von Gernerth was born in Purkersdorf, and worked as a judge at the Higher Regional Court in Vienna after studying law first in Hungarian, from 1860 in the Austrian judicial service . As a writer he wrote contributions to the August 1840-42 published music journal "Orpheus" as well as song lyrics, as a composer he set to music in addition to his own especially those of his contemporaries.

Gernerth is still known today for his text version of the waltz on the beautiful blue Danube. Since original verses of Josef Weyl were strongly related to current events, the work was seldom performed in the choral version. As a member of the Wiener Männergesang-Verein, to which Johann Strauss (Sohn) had dedicated this work, he wrote a new text in 1889, which now also took into account the title of the waltz and helped the work to a rebirth. The first performance with Gernerths words took place on 2 July 1890 during a summer Liedertafel of the association in Dreher Park in Meidling instead.

In old age he suffered from increasing visual impairment. Gernerth married to a sister of the writer Andreas Freiherr von Stifft. His grave is located in the Hietzing Cemetery.

== Works ==
Compiled according to the catalog of the music collection of the Austrian National Libraryand the Vienna Library (as of February 2009)

"Danube so blue"

Text for the 1st Waltz by Franz von Gernerth, 1889. ^{[3]}

Danube, so blue, through the valley and the Au, you calmly weigh, you greet our Vienna, your silver ribbon, ties land to land, and beat up happy hearts on your beautiful beach. Far from the Black Forest you hurry to the sea, spendest blessings	allerwegen, eastward is your run, take on a lot of brothers: Image of unity for all time. See old castles down from the heights, like to greet from afar, and the mountains wreath, bright from the morning shine is reflected in your waves dance.

Compositions

(The texts are from the composer, unless stated otherwise)

- Agnes . Song for voice and piano. Text by Eduard Mörike.
- Old and New Vienna. Song for voice and piano.
- Old chimney piece. Song for voice and piano. Text: Heinrich Heine.
- On the Manzanares In music set for a voice with accompaniment of the piano. From the Spanish songbook by Emanuel Geibel and Paul Heyse.
- On the Road, op. 27. Song for voice and piano. Poem by Max Kalbeck.
- The Andalusian Girl, op. 3. For voice and piano. Poem by Ludwig Goldhann. Dedicated to Miss Anna Zerr kk Court opera singer.
- Anti-Lohengrin for voice and piano. Text by Julius Stettenhim.
- The Old Tannenbaum, op. 30. Song for voice and piano. Poem by Rudolf Baumbach.
- From a young age . Song for polyphonic male vocals.
- Ballad for voice and piano. Text after the " flying leaves ".
- The most beautiful mug . Song for voice and piano. Text by Rudolf Baumbach. Vienna 1886.
- The encounter . For a voice with piano accompaniment. Text by A. Langer.
- At Aspern! Song for voice and piano.
- With the wine . Song for a bass voice with accompaniment of the piano. Poem by Anton Langer.
- Consilium medicum for male quartet. Text by Franz Grillparzer.
- Corona for voice and piano. Poem by Adolph L'Arronge.
- Curiosity story . Song for voice and piano. Text by Robert Reinik.
- The Three Feathers, op. 32. Song for voice and piano. Text: Rudolf Baumbach.
- Three keys . Cheerful song for voice and piano. Text by Rudolf Baumbach.
- Skating polka, op. 28. For voice and piano. Dedicated to Mr. Alexander Girardi.
- Memory of 14 March 1848 . The University . Song for voice and piano.
- The first quadrille, op. 9. For piano four hands.
- It was an old king. Song for voice and piano. Text: Heinrich Heine.
- Eskimojade for male quartet and piano.
- Driving probably for 4-voice male choir. Text by Karl Stieller. 1890th
- Fatal . Humorous song for voice and piano.
- Garden scene for song and piano. Text: Julius Bauer.
- Marriage proposal, op. 53. Song for four male voices with piano accompaniment. Dedicated to the quartet Udel.
- D 'witch for male quartet. Text by Georg Eberl.
- The little Hydriot, op. 11. Song for voice and piano. From the songs of the Greeks by Wilhelm Müller.
- I want to say ... song for a voice with piano. From the Hungarian of Alexander Petofi.
- The Ichthyosaurus . Ballad for male quartet. Text by Friedrich Theodor Vischer.
- In the quiet night . Men's choir with baritone solo and piano.
- The Invalide, op. 1. (Le vieux Sergent.) Song for voice and piano.
- Jubelfest-Quadrille, op. 60. For piano four hands. His dear grandson Ernst von Gernerth.
- The cavalryman for a cheerful quartet.
- Force-force anthem for male quartet. Text by Ernst Eckstein.
- La bonne vieille, op. 12. Chanson de Beranger. Dediee a Madame la Marquise de Caux.
- Girl loyalty for 4-voice male choir.
- The monks of Johannisberg . Song for voice and piano. Text by Bernhard Scholz.
- Latest wanderlust for male quartet.
- Rose and oak . Song for song and piano. Poem by Josef Weyl.
- Singer serenade for four male voices.
- Nice Rothkraut . Parody for male quartet.
- Terrible end . Chemically romantic ballad for male quartet.
- Serenade for male quartet. To sing in front of Franz Schubert's statue.
- Dance exam . Polka française. Dedicated to the Student Ball Comite.
- Dance song . Song for 4-part male choir with accompaniment of pianoforte.
- The ungeniated . Waltz for piano.
- Our host for men's quartet.
- Infidelity . Folk song from Swabia for 2 voices and piano.
- Venetian Trias for male quartet and piano. Text by Anastasius Grün.
- Verrathene Liebe, op. 33. Song for voice and piano. Text by Adelbert von Chamisso.
- Vorsatz, op. 31. Song for voice and piano. Poem by Robert R. Prutz. Dedicated to the kk court opera singer Miss Hermione Braga.
- Waltz for piano for 4 hands, op. 10.
- Consecration song to celebrate the final decision in the Justice Palace in Vienna . Seal of Victor von Umlauff of Frankwell. 1,881th
- If you only understand, op. 34. Song for voice and piano. Text: Robert Reinik.
- The winter coat. A scientific study . Humoresque for 4 male voices and piano.

Seals and translations

- On the lagoon at night ( Oh, how so beautiful to look at ). Text for the Lagoon Waltz from Operetta A Night in Venice for the Viennese First Performance.
- Dirnd'l mi has to stop . 2nd verse by Franz von Gernerth. Musical adaptation for 4-part male choir a cappella by Eduard Kremser.
- On the beautiful blue Danube, Op. 314. Poetry of Franz von Gernerth. Walzer for pianoforte and choir, the Viennese men's song association dedicated by Johann Strauss, kk Hofball music director.
- The fallen angel . After the French of G. Desfosse transferred by Franz von Gernerth. Music for voice and piano by Adolphe Vogel.
- Greater Vienna ( Let me sing you, you future Vienna ). Text draft from 4 verses to the waltz with choir by Johann Strauss op. 440. 1890.
- In Vienna, it's all about tra ra . March couplet. Music by Gustav Pick.
- Schön-Gretchen, op. 39. Polka française. Text by Franz von Gernerth. Song for 4-part male choir and piano by Rudolf Freiherr von Prandau.
- Tyrolean folk song : Song for piano with deliberate singing voice arranged by Eduard Kremser.
- Drinking song . Poem by Franz von Gernerth. For 4-part male choir a cappella composed and sincerely dedicated to the Lord Med. D.or FS Plachetsky by Franz Sersawy.

Other

- From the world of crime. Collection of charitable lectures. Edited by the German Association for the Dissemination of Charitable Knowledge in Prague.
