= List of works by Johann Karl von Ordonez =

This is a list of musical compositions by Johann Karl von Ordonez, also known as Carlo d'Ordonez (April 19, 1734 – September 16, 1786), as given in the catalog by A. Peter * Brown.

== Symphonies ==
- Brown I:A1 – Symphony in A major: I. Allegro molto, II. Andante, III. Minuet: Tempo giusto – Scherzante, IV. Finale: Presto
- Brown I:A2 – Symphony in A major: I. Allegro vivace, II. Andante arioso, III. Tempo di minuetto ma vivace
- Brown I:A3 – Symphony in A major (lost)
- Brown I:A4 – Symphony in A major: I. Allegro piu presto con franchezza, II. Andante, III. Allegro
- Brown I:A5 – Symphony in A major: I. Allegro molto, II. Andante, III. Fugato
- Brown I:A6 – Symphony in A major: I. Allegro molto, II. Grazioso, III. Presto
- Brown I:A7 – Symphony in A major: I. Allegro, II. Andante molto, III. Allegro
- Brown I:A8 – Symphony in A major: I. Allegro, II. Andante, III. Menuetto, IV. Prestissimo
- Brown I:A9 – Symphony in A major: I. Tempo giusto allegro, II. Andante un poco adagio, III. Menuetto
- Brown I:A10 – Symphony in A major: I. Allegro, II. Andante, III. Menuet
- Brown I:A11 – Symphony in A major: I. Allegro moderato, II. Andante, III. Allegro
- Brown I:B1 – Symphony in B♭ major: I. Allegro, II. Andante, III. Presto
- Brown I:B2 – Symphony in B♭ major: I. Allegro, II. Andante, III. Menuetto, IV. Presto
- Brown I:B3 – Symphony in B♭ major: I. Allegro, II. Andante, III. Menuet, IV. Presto
- Brown I:B4 – Symphony in B♭ major: I. Andante – Allegro molto, II. Minuetto: Maestoso, III. Finale: Allegro molto
- Brown I:B5 – Symphony in B♭ major: I. Vivace, II. Andante un poco adagio, III. Finale: Volante
- Brown I:B6 – Symphony in B♭ major: I. Allegro spiritoso, II. Andante più tosto adagio, III. Presto
- Brown I:B7 – Symphony in B♭ major: I. Allegro molto con garbo, II. Andante, III. Menuet, IV. Presto
- Brown I:B8 – Symphony in B♭ major: I. Allegro, II. Andante, III. Menuet, IV. Finale: Presto
- Brown I:Bm1 – Symphony in B minor: I. Allegro maestoso e con garbo, II. Andantino, III. Rondeau non troppo presto
- Brown I:C1 – Symphony in C major: I. Adagio – Allegro molto, II. Andante, III. Finale: Tempo di menuet
- Brown I:C2 – Symphony in C major: I. Adagio – Allegro, II. Larghetto, III. Presto
- Brown I:C3 – Symphony in C major: I. Allegro con fuoco, II. Andantino, III. Menuetto, IV. Finale: Presto
- Brown I:C4 – Symphony in C major: I. Allegro, II. Andante, III. Menuetto
- Brown I:C5 – Symphony in C major: I. Allegro, II. Andante alla Francese, III. Allegro
- Brown I:C6 – Symphony in C major, Allegro (1 movement only)
- Brown I:C7 – Symphony in C major: I. Allegro, II. Andante, III. Allegro risoluto
- Brown I:C8 – Symphony in C major: I. Allegro molto, II. Andante, III. Finale: Presto
- Brown I:C9 – Symphony in C major: I. Adagio – Allegro, II. Andantino, III. Finale
- Brown I:C10 – Symphony in C major: I. Allegro in tempo comodo, II. Andante più tosto adagio, III. Allegro
- Brown I:C11 – Symphony in C major: I. Allegro, II. Andante, III. Allegro
- Brown I:C12 – Symphony in C major: I. Allegro moderato con spirito, II. Andante, III. Finale: Allegro molto
- Brown I:C13 – Symphony in C major: I. Allegro, II. Andantino, III. Finale
- Brown I:C14 – Symphony in C minor: I. Allegro, II. Andante, III. Menuetto, IV. Allegro con spirito
- Brown I:D1 – Symphony in D major: I. Allegro con spirito, II. Andante grazioso, III. Menuetto: Lento – Allegrino, IV. Finale: Presto
- Brown I:D2 – Symphony in D major: I. Allegro molto, II. Andante moderato, III. Menuet, IV. Finale: Presto
- Brown I:D3 – Symphony in D major: I. Allegro spiritoso, II. Andante, III. Allegro molto
- Brown I:D4 – Symphony in D major: I. Allegro, II. Andante, III. Presto
- Brown I:D5 – Symphony in D major: I. Adagio – Vivace, II. Andante cantabile, III. Intermezzo: Allegro scherzante, IV. Menuetto, V. Andante siciliano un poco lento, VI. Menuetto, VII. Finale: Allegro
- Brown I:D6 – Symphony in D major: I. Allegro molto, II. Andante, III. Allegro non troppo
- Brown I:D7 – Symphony in D major: I. Allegro assai, II. Andante, III. Non troppo presto
- Brown I:D8 – Symphony in D major: I. Allegro, II. Andante, III. Tempo di menuet
- Brown I:D9 – Symphony in D major: I. Allegro, II. Andante lento, III. Tempo di menuetto
- Brown I:D10 – Symphony in D major: I. Allegro molto, II. Andante, III. Finale: Presto
- Brown I:E1 – Symphony in E major: I. Andante arioso – Allegro, II. Andantino, III. Tempo di menuet
- Brown I:E2 – Symphony in E major: I. Allegro, II. Andantino, III. Finale: Allegro
- Brown I:E3 – Symphony in E major, Allegro (1 movement only)
- Brown I:E4 – Symphony in E major: I. Vivace, II. Andante scherzante, III. Allegro fugato in tempo giusto
- Brown I:Es1 – Symphony in E♭ major: I. Allegro, II. Andante, III. Allegro moderato
- Brown I:Es2 – Symphony in E♭ major, Allegro (1 movement only)
- Brown I:Es3 – Symphony in E♭ major: I. Andante, II. Allegro
- Brown I:Es4 – Symphony in E♭ major: I. Allegro molto, II. Andante grazioso, III. Allegro molto
- Brown I:Es5 – Symphony in E♭ major: I. Allegro molto, II. Andante, III. Finale: Presto
- Brown I:F1 – Symphony in F major: I. Allegro molto, II. Andante, III. Finale
- Brown I:F2 – Symphony in F major: I. Vivace, II. Adagio cantabile, III. Vivace
- Brown I:F3 – Symphony in F major: I. Vivace, II. Andantino scherzante, III. Finale
- Brown I:F4 – Symphony in F major: I. Allegro molto in tempo di presto, II. Andantino, III. Finale
- Brown I:F5 – Symphony in F major: I. Allegro moderato, II. Andante, III. Finale
- Brown I:F6 – Symphony in F major: I. Allegro molto, II. Andante molto, III. Menuetto: Moderato, IV. Finale: Presto
- Brown I:F7 – Symphony in F major: I. Allegro, II. Andante non troppo lento, III. Presto
- Brown I:F8 – Symphony in F major: I. Andante, II. Fuga, III. Menuet
- Brown I:F9 – Symphony in F major: I. Andante, II. Allegro molto, III. Menuetto, IV. Presto
- Brown I:F10 – Symphony in F major: I. Allegro molto, II. Andante, III. (no tempo indication)
- Brown I:F11 – Symphony in F major: I. Allegro molto, II. Andante, III. Gustoso
- Brown I:F12 – Symphony in F minor: I. Allegro moderato, II. Andantino scherzante, III. Menuetto, IV. Finale
- Brown I:G1 – Symphony in G major: I. Allegro maestoso, II. Andante, III. Rondo in tempo comodo
- Brown I:G2 – Symphony in G major: I. Allegro, II. Andante, III. (no tempo indication)
- Brown I:G3 – Symphony in G major: I. Allegro con garbo, II. Andante in tempo di menuetto, III. Allegro molto
- Brown I:G4 – Symphony in G major: I. Allegro, II. Andante, III. Finale: Allegro molto
- Brown I:G5 – Symphony in G major: I. Allegro molto, II. Andante, III. Rondeau: Allegro
- Brown I:G6 – Symphony in G minor, Allegro (1 movement only)
- Brown I:G7 – Symphony in G minor: I. Allegro, II. Andante, III. Allegro non troppo con garbo
- Brown I:G8 – Symphony in G minor: I. Allegro, II. Andante, III. Allegro

=== Symphonies attributed to Ordonez ===
Four symphonies in C major have been attributed to Ordonez. Two of them have also been attributed to Georg Christoph Wagenseil, while one * Brown believes to be by Niccolò Piccinni. For the fourth one * Brown doubts Ordonez' authorship for purely stylistic reasons. There's also a D major symphony * Brown believes to be by Leopold Hoffmann.

== Other orchestral ==
- Brown II:D1 – Concerto for Violin and Orchestra in A Major
- Brown IIa:D1 – Violin Concerto in D major
- Brown IIb:1 – Serenade "Das Denkmal des Friedens" (lost)
- Brown IIb:2 – Partita Turca per la caccia (lost)
- Brown IIc:1 – 12 minuets for orchestra
- Brown IIc:2 – Pantomime

== Chamber music ==
- Brown IIIa:F1 – Wind octet in F major
- Brown IIIb:F1 – Sextet for strings & horns in F major
- Brown IIIc:Es1 – Cassatio for strings & horns in E♭ major
- Brown IIIc:Es2 – String Quintet in E♭ major
- Brown IIIc:F1 – Quintet for strings & horns in F major
- Brown IIIc:F2 – Cassatio for strings & horns in F major
- Brown IV:A1 – String Quartet Op. 1 No.1 in A major
- Brown IV:A2 – String Quartet Op. 3 No.4 in A major
- Brown IV:A3 – String Quartet Op. 2 No.4 in A major
- Brown IV:A4 – String Quartet in A minor
- Brown IV:B1 – String Quartet Op. 1 No.5 in B♭ major
- Brown IV:B2 – String Quartet Op. 2 No.1 in B♭ major
- Brown IV:B3 – String Quartet in B♭ major
- Brown IV:B4 – String Quartet Op. 4 No.2 in B♭ major
- Brown IV:C1 – String Quartet Op. 4 No.4 in C major
- Brown IV:C2 – String Quartet Op. 3 No.3 in C major
- Brown IV:C3 – String Quartet Op. 2 No.3 in C major
- Brown IV:C4 – String Quartet Op. 1 No.3 in C minor
- Brown IV:D1 – String Quartet Op. 3 No.2 in D major
- Brown IV:D2 – String Quartet Op. 4 No.6 in D major
- Brown IV:D3 – String Quartet Op. 3 No.6 in D major
- Brown IV:D4 – String Quartet Op. 2 No.2 in D major
- Brown IV:Es1 – String Quartet Op. 4 No.3 in E♭ major
- Brown IV:Es2 – String Quartet Op. 1 No.4 in E♭ major
- Brown IV:F1 – String Quartet Op. 4 No.1 in F major
- Brown IV:F2 – String Quartet Op. 3 No.5 in F major
- Brown IV:F3 – String Quartet Op. 1 No.2 in F major
- Brown IV:F4 – String Quartet in F major
- Brown IV:F5 – String Quartet Op. 2 No.5 in F minor
- Brown IV:G1 – String Quartet Op. 1 No.6 in G major
- Brown IV:G1 – String Quartet Op. 4 No.5 in G major
- Brown IV:G3 – String Quartet Op. 3 No.1 in G major
- Brown IV:G4 – String Quartet Op. 2 No.6 in G minor

== Sonatas ==
- Brown V:A1 – Sonatas for 2 violins & continuo in A major
- Brown V:A2 – Sonatas for 2 violins & continuo in A major
- Brown V:A3 – Sonatas for 2 violins & continuo in A major
- Brown V:A4 – Sonatas for 2 violins & continuo in A major
- Brown V:B1 – Sonatas for 2 violins & continuo in B♭ major
- Brown V:B2 – Sonatas for 2 violins & continuo in B♭ major
- Brown V:C1 – Sonatas for 2 violins & continuo in C major
- Brown V:C2 – Sonatas for 2 violins & continuo in C major
- Brown V:C3 – Sonatas for 2 violins & continuo in C minor
- Brown V:D1 – Sonatas for 2 violins & continuo in D major
- Brown V:D2 – Sonatas for 2 violins & continuo in D major
- Brown V:D3 – Sonatas for 2 violins & continuo in D major
- Brown V:Es1 – Sonatas for 2 violins & continuo in E♭ major
- Brown V:Es2 – Sonatas for 2 violins & continuo in E♭ major
- Brown V:Es3 – Sonatas for 2 violins & continuo in E♭ major
- Brown V:F1 – Sonatas for 2 violins & continuo in F major
- Brown V:F2 – Sonatas for 2 violins & continuo in F major
- Brown V:F3 – Sonatas for 2 violins & continuo in F major
- Brown V:F4 – Sonatas for 2 violins & continuo in F major
- Brown V:G1 – Sonatas for 2 violins & continuo in G major
- Brown V:G2 – Sonatas for 2 violins & continuo in G major
- Brown VI:D1 – Violin Sonata in D major
- Brown VI:Es1 – Violin Sonata in E♭ major

== Stage music ==
- Brown VIIa:1 – Alceste
- Brown VIIa:2 – Diesmal hat der Mann den Willen! (fragment)
- Brown VIIb:1 – Der alte wienerische Tandelmarkt (lost)

Ordonez wrote music for a marionett parody of Gluck's Alceste, and the singspiel Diesmal hat der Mann den Willen is said to be a parody of Grétry's Le Maître en droit.
