= Jakob Schgraffer =

Tyrolean composer and coffee house owner

Jakob Johann Anton Schgraffer (May 15, 1799 in Bozen – March 23, 1859) was a Tyrolean composer and coffee house owner. He studied at Milan Conservatory under Vincenzo Federici.

== Works ==
His best known work, revived and recorded in 2012, is the oratorio Die Angst und der Tod des Erlösers. Other works include:

- Laura betet. Engelharfen, B-Dur. Die Bethende Laura. Gedicht von Matthison, Music von J. Schgraffer
