= Josef Dessauer =

Czech/Austrian composer (1798-1876)

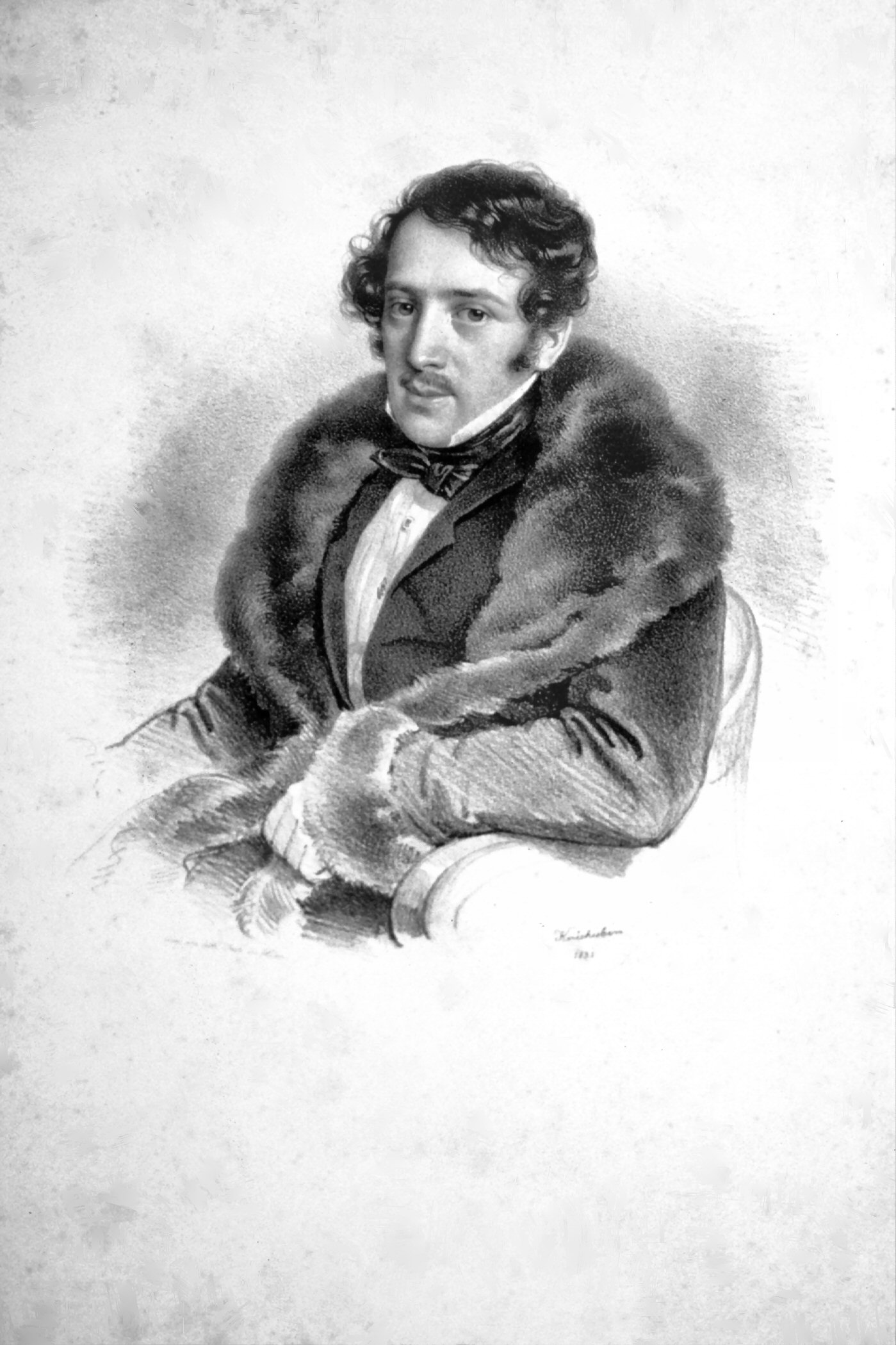
Josef Dessauer, 1831

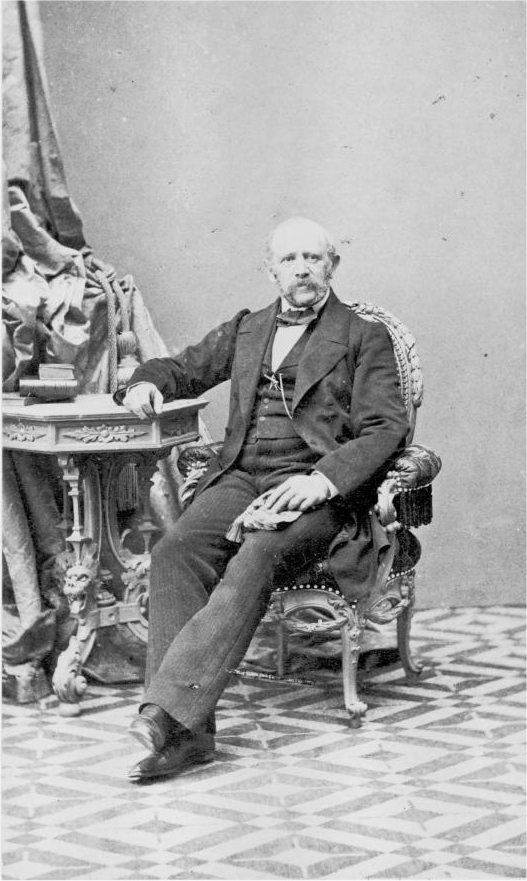
Josef Dessauer

Josef Dessauer (28 May 1798 in Prague – 8 July 1876 in Mödling, near Vienna), was a composer from the Austrian Empire who wrote many popular songs, and also some less successful operas.

== Life ==
Dessauer was born into a wealthy Jewish family, and studied piano in Prague with Bedřich Diviš Weber and composition with Wenzel Tomaschek. Dessauer began as a song composer, but later began composing operas, of which very few were performed.

In 1821 he settled in Vienna, from which he made many European tours. He was a friend of many composers of his time, such as Gioachino Rossini, Franz Schubert, Hector Berlioz, Felix Mendelssohn, Franz Liszt and Frédéric Chopin, who dedicated some pieces to him. He was also a friend of George Sand.

== Operas ==
- Lidwinna (1836)
- Ein Besuch in Saint-Cyr (1838)
- Paquita (1851)
- Domingo (1860)
- Oberon (which was never performed)

== Songs ==
- "Verschwiegenheit"
- "Das Gebet"
- "Wie Glücklich"
- "Am Strande"
- "Ich Denke Dein"
- "Das Zerbrochene Ringlein"
