= Maria Bach =

Austrian musician and artist

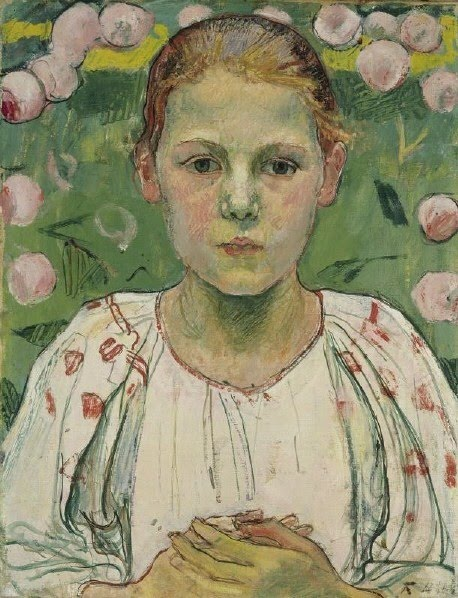
- Maria Baroness von Bach by Ferdinand Hodler
- Born: Emilie Maria Baroness von Bach; 11 March 1896; Vienna, Austria
- Died: 26 February 1978 (aged 81); Vienna, Austria
- Occupations: Musician; Artist

Emilie Marie Baroness von Bach (1896–1978) was an Austrian pianist, violinist, composer and artist.

Wolgaquintett
Bach's "Volga" Quintet (1928) played by Christine Busch, Elene Meipariani, Klaus Christa, Mathias Johansen and Akiko Shiochi

== Early life and family ==
Maria Bach was born in Vienna, Austria, on 11 March 1896. Her parents were Robert Bonaventura Michael Wenzel von Bach and Eleonore Josepha Maria Theresia Auguste Bach. In 1897, she moved with her family to the castle, Leesdorf, in Baden, Austria. Bach's father, Robert, was an attorney, painter, and violinist. Her mother, Elenore, was both a singer and composer who performed under the conductors Gustav Mahler and Johannes Brahms. Maria had two older sisters, Theresa and Katharina, and a younger sister, named Henriette. Theresa wrote poetry that was put to Bach's music. Katharina married into a highly aristocratic family. Henriette was a solo cellist. Marie took piano lessons at the Musikschule Grimm in Baden and at the age of fourteen began violin lessons.

== Early music ==
Maria Bach began private piano lessons at the age of five with a faculty member at the Grimm School of Music. She would later take lessons with Paul De Conne in 1912. At the same time, she also began violin lessons with Jaroslav Suchy of the Vienna Opera. She played second violin and viola in her father's in-house string ensemble. Bach's parents demanded that both she and Henriette perform long and consistent hours of individual practice. The two daughters would regularly have three hour music reading sessions for learning classical and romantic chamber music. In 1914, she started composing her first prelude, which she followed with songs and other piano pieces. On Sundays Maria and Henriette were allowed to perform at their family's soirees, gatherings where music was performed by the Bach family, when they became more experienced with their instruments. In 1917, Bach composed "Flohtanz (Flea's Dance)." In "Flohtanz" the lively solo piano lasts for approximately three minutes.

== Education ==
Maria Bach began studying composition at the Vienna Academy of Music with Joseph Marx in 1919. Under the tutelage of Marx, Bach wrote four-part fugues, brief piano scores, and analyzed the music of Chopin, Debussy, and Stravinsky. Marx would later help Bach develop her own personal style of composing. She made her debut as a composer in 1921 with Narrenlieder für Tenor und Orchester, a song cycle which was later printed by Schott in Vienna.

== Vienna Academy of Music (1919-1925) ==
Maria began studying at the Vienna Academy of Music in 1919 studying composition under the tutelage of Joseph Marx with whom she analyzed the music of Chopin, Debussy, and Stravinsky. While studying under Marx, Bach specialized in writing four-part fugues and brief piano scores. Marx would later help Bach develop her own style of composing by utilizing variations in rhythms and sonorities.

== Music during World War II ==
During the war, the Nazi party established music prohibitions in Austria. Due to their preference for classical music, which was considered conservative and traditional, "modern" compositions were not allowed to be performed. However, Bach's compositions were deemed both conservative and traditional among Nazi standards and were deemed acceptable to be performed.

== Relationships and marriage ==
During the 1920s Bach developed a relationship with Ivan Boutnikoff, a Russian composer and conductor. Boutnikoff later became her mentor in conducting and orchestration. On 7 October 1952 Bach married Arturo Ciacelli. The two stayed married until Ciacelli's death in 1966. Ciacelli was an Italian painter who taught art at The Italian School in Vienna from 1939 to 1941. During their time together, Bach began painting landscapes, mainly of Italy. After she began to exhibit, her paintings became almost more successful than her compositions. Ciacelli died in 1966 and for a while Bach gave up creative endeavors, but eventually began to compose again. She received a gold medal for composition in 1962 and was awarded the title of professor in 1976.

== Death ==
Bach died on 26 February 1978, possibly from inhalation of a gas leakage from her defective oven in her apartment in Vienna. Her papers are housed in the City Hall Library in Vienna.

== Works ==
Alphabetical Order:

- 1926 Abend (Evening)
- 1919 Abendläuten
- 1939 Abends (In the Evening)
- 1977 Abends (In the Evening)
- 1926 Abschied (Farewell)
- 1949 Acht Orchesterlieder (Eight Songs with Orchestra)
- 1919 Allein (Alone)
- 1946 Allerseelen (All Souls)
- 1963 Altdeutsche Marienlieder (Old German Marienlieder)
- 1949 Altes Kirchenlied (Old Hymn)
- 1952 Altgriechisches Volkslied (Ancient Greek Folk Song)
- 1972 Alt-Wien verzaubert (Alt-Wien Enchants)
- 1929 Am Feuer (At the Fire)
- 1940 Am Klavier (At the Piano)
- 1952 Andacht (Reverence)
- 1949 An den Gekreuzigten (To the Crucified)
- 1969 An den Mond (To the Moon)
- 1940 An Novalis (To Novalis)
- 1931 Arabische Nächte (Arabian Nights)
- 1977 Auf Bergeshöh (On the Mountains Heights)
- 1945 Auf der Wiese (On the Grass)
- 1959 Auf Wegen erlebt (Experienced on Ways)
- 1941 Ayacucho-Perou (Ayacucho, Peru)
- 1935 Ballettsuite in vier Bildern (Ballet Suite in Four Scenes)
- 1951 Begegnung/Erfüllung (Meeting/Fulfillment)
- 1916 Bei dir ist es traut (With You it is Familiar)
- 1939 Bei Sonnenuntergang (At Sunset)
- 1928 Bei St. Heinrich (At St. Heinrich)
- 1937 Bengele
- 1943 Bengele-Tänze (Bengele-Dances)
- 1952 Bergkirchlein
- 1967 Besinnlichkeit (Thoughtfulness)
- 1918 Besinnlichkeit (Determination)
- 1926 Bild (Image)
- 1957 Bildstock (Wayside Shrine)
- 1964 Blick in den Strom (View of the Current)
- 1958 Blumentreppe (Flower Stairs)
- 1974 Böse Verzauberung (Evil Enchantment)
- 1918 Choralvorspiel (Chorale Prelude)
- 1957 Chorlied für 'Frl. Julie' (Chorale song for “Miss Julie”)
- 1925 Darum (Therefore)
- 1976 Das alte Haus in der Singerstraße (The Old House in Singerstraße)
- 1968 Das andere Gesicht (The Other Face)
- 1939 Das Einrücken (The Engagement)
- 1940 Das Hirschlein (The Little Stag)
- 1955 Das Karussel (The Carousel)
- 1950 Das Marienleben (The Life of the Virgin)
- 1939 Das Paradies (The Paradise)
- 1977 Deine Augen (Your Eyes)
- 1960 Der Abend hüllt sich in Nebel (The Evening Wrapped in Fog)
- 1919 Der Barbarazweig (The Barbara Branch)
- 1968 Der Dreiklang (The Triad)
- 1952 Der Neugierige (The Curious)
- 1927 Der rote Stein (The Red Stone)
- 1945 Der rote Stein (The Red Stone)
- 1925 Der schlafend Wind (The Sleeping Wind)
- 1925 Der tapfere Schneider (The Brave Tailor)
- 1928 Der Wanderer kniet (The Wanderer Kneels)
- 1973 Dialogue
- 1940 Die Blume (The Flower)
- 1974 Die Braut - Die Stille (The Bride - Silence)
- 1945 Die einsame Feuerlilie (The Lonely Fire Lily)
- 1968 Die goldene Regel (The Golden Rule)
- 1949 Die gute Tat (The Good Deed)
- 1925 Die Mühle (The Mill)
- 1926 Die Mutter (The Mother)
- 1962 Die Schwester (The Sister)
- 1967 Die weiße Taube (The White Dove)
- 1930 Drei frühe Klavierstücke (Three Early Piano Pieces)
- 1977 Drei japanische Lieder (Three Japanese Songs)
- 1940 Drei Lieder nach K. Wache (Three Songs by K. Wache)
- 1951 Drei Lieder nach Texten von F. Nietzsche (Three Songs on texts by Nietzsche)
- 1957 Drei Lieder nach Texten von F. Th. Csokor (Three Songs on Texts by F. Th. Csokor)
- 1967 Drei Lieder nach Texten von Friedrich Nietzsche (Three Songs on Texts by Friedrich Nietzsche)
- 1963 Drei Lieder nach Texten von H. Strauss-Guttmann (Three Songs on Texts by H. Strauss-Guttmann)
- 1955 Drei Negro Spirituals (Three Negro Spirituals)
- 1931 Drei Orchesterlieder (Three Orchestral Songs)
- 1932 Drei Ritornelle (Hebräische Gesänge) (Three Ritornelli (Hebrew Chants))
- 1956 Drei Stücke zum Tode Mariä (Three pieces for Death of Mary)
- 1925 Du gehst mit (You Go along)
- 1926 Ebbe (Low Tide)
- 1939 Ein Birkhuhn (A Black Grouse)
- 1959 Einsame Weihnacht (Lonely Christmas)
- 1967 Ein Stückerl Alt-Wien (A little piece of Alt-Wien)
- 1917 Erinnerung (Survey)
- 1918 Erhebung (Memory)
- 1845 Erwartung (Expectation)
- 1940 Erwartung (Expectation)
- 1929 Es ist der Mond (It’s the Moon)
- 1926 Fahlgrauer Himmel (Pale Gray Sky)
- 1917 Flohtanz (Flea Dance)
- 1926 Fremd ist was deine Lippen sagen (Foreign Is What Your Lips Say)
- 1952 Freude (Pleasure)
- 1959 Frisch geschnittene Wiesen (Freshly Cut Meadows)
- 1919 Fromm (Religious)
- 1950 Frost
- 1917 Frühherbst (Early Autumn)
- 1925 Frühlingsnacht (Spring Night)
- 1959 Fünf Lieder nach Texten von A. Laube (Five Songs by A. Laube)
- 1937 Fünf Lieder nach Texten von Guido Zernatto (Five Songs by Guido Zernatto)
- 1957 Fünf Lieder nach Texten von F. Th. Csokor (Five Songs with Lyrics by F. Th. Csokor)
- 1958 Fünf Lieder nach Texten von H. Hesse (Five Songs on texts by Hermann Hesse)
- 1953 Fünf romanische Volkslieder (Five Rhaeto-Romanic Folk Songs)
- 1939 Fünf Sonette (Five Sonnets)
- 1953 Gedenken (Memory)
- 1919 Geh’ nicht (Do not Go)
- 1969 Geld (Money)
- 1941 Giacona und Tanz (Giacona and Dance)
- 1965 Griechisches Volkslied (Greek Folk Song)
- 1967 Heart to Heart
- 1932 Heimweh (Homesickness)
- 1919 Helle Nacht (Light Night)
- 1955 Hirtenlied (Pastoral Song)
- 1949 Höllenlied (Hell Song)
- 1949 Hymn (Anthem)
- 1959 Ich gab dir einen Namen (I Gave You a Name)
- 1925 Ich liebe vergessene Flurmadonnen (I Love Forgotten Hallway Madonnas)
- 1932 Ich stieg in einen Hain (I went into a Grove)
- 1919 Ich werde längst gestorben sein (I’ll Be Long Dead)
- 1927 Im Dunkel (In the Dark)
- 1925 Im Frühling oder im Traume (In Spring, as in a Dream)
- 1944 Im Grase (In the Grass)
- 1944 Im Park (In the Park)
- 1948 Im Park (In the Park)
- 1963 Impressioni Italiane (Italian Impressions)
- 1962 Impressioni Romane (Roman Impressions)
- 1954 Im Reiche des Lichts (In the Kingdom of Light)
- 1948 Im Walde (In the Forest)
- 1930 Japanischer Frühling (Japanese Spring, a cycle of 15 songs)
- 1917 Jasminenstrauch (Jasmine)
- 1928 Junges Volk (Young People)
- 1952 Karelisches Hirtenlied (Karelian Herdsman Song)
- 1919 Klage (Plaint)
- 1932 Klagegebet (Action Prayer)
- 1930 Klavierquartett (Piano Quartet)
- 1940 Kleine Veronika (Small Veronika)
- 1966 Krähenlied (Crows Song)
- 1967 La Chute (The Fall)
- 1965 Lärm (Noise)
- 1975 La Tranche sur Mer (a village on the west coast of France)
- 1956 Licht (Light)
- 1940 Liebe (Love)
- 1925 Liebesgedicht (Love Poem)
- 1956 Liebesruh (Liebesruh)
- 1949 Lied vom Meer (Song of the Sea)
- 1967 (Marcia Funebra)
- 1968 (Marcia Funebra)
- 1948 März (March)
- 1950 Meiner toten Mutter (To My Dead Mother)
- 1972 Meine tobenden Sinne löst ein Traum (My Raging Sense Solves a Dream)
- 1919 Mein Glück (My Luck)
- 1926 Mittag (Noon)
- 1947 Mode (Fashion)
- 1918 Mondaufgang (Moon Rising)
- 1919 Morgengruß (Morning Greeting)
- 1972 Morgenrot (Dawn)
- 1926 Nachtbild (Night Image)
- 1953 Napoli (Naples)
- 1921 Narrenlieder (Fool Songs)
- 1926 Negroid
- 1929 Oliven in Silber (Olives in Silver)
- 1918 Orakel (Oracle)
- 1920 Orgelfantasie und Fuge (Fantasy and Fugue for Organ)
- 1929 Prelude and Fugue
- 1920 Prelude and Fugue II
- 1925 Prelude
- 1915 Prelude I
- 1917 Prelude II
- 1919 Praeludium und Fuge (Prelude and Fuge)
- 1940 Rabenballade
- 1920 Reverie
- 1918 Ruhe (Rest)
- 1953 Santa Maria della Salute
- 1940 Schildkrötentier (Pet Turtles)
- 1940 Schlaflied (Lullaby)
- 1950 Schlaflied (Lullaby)
- 1942 Schlummerlied (Lullaby)
- 1940 Schottisches Lied (Scottish Song)
- 1966 Schwermut (Melancholy)
- 1939 Schwüle Nacht (Sultry Night)
- 1944 Sechs altdeutsche Marienlieder (Six Old German Songs of Mary)
- 1928 Sechs Lieder nach Texten von Christian Morgenstern (Six Songs on texts by Christian Morgenstern)
- 1959 Sechs Lieder nach Texten von Christian Morgenstern (Six Songs on texts by Christian Morgenstern)
- 1944 Seguidilla, Sirenen, Tanz (Seguidilla, Sirens, Dance)
- 1932 Sieben altjapanische Lieder (Seven Old-Japanese Songs)
- 1938 Silhouetten (Silhouettes)
- 1937 Silhouetten (Silhouettes)
- 1920 Skizzen zu einer 4-stimmigen Fuge (Sketches for Four Part Fugue)
- 1925 Sommerallein (Summer Alone)
- 1922 Sonate für Violoncello (Sonata for Solo Cello)
- 1922 Sonate für Violoncello und Klavier (Sonata for Cello and Piano)
- 1944 Sommerwiese (Summer Meadow)
- 1925 Spätsommer (Late Summer)
- 1939 Stratosfera (Stratosphere)
- 1935 Streichquartett Nr. 1 (String Quartet no.1)
- 1942 Streichquartett Nr. 2 (String Quartet no.2)
- 1936 Streichquintett (String Quintet)
- 1948 Tänze (Dances)
- 1956 Thema und Variationen (Theme and Variations)
- 1918 Tief ist der Abgrund (Deep in the Abyss)
- 1977 Toccata
- 1918 Tod (Death)
- 1968 Trennung und Wiederkehr (Separation and Recovery)
- 1939 Trunk’ne Nacht (Drunken Night)
- 1918 Über ein Grab hin (Above a Grave)
- 1968 Und ich trug die Seligkeit (And I Wore the Bliss)
- 1946 Unkenlied (Toads Song)
- 1965 Unter Feinden (The Departed)
- 1920 Variationen 4-16 (Variations 4-16)
- 1918 Verhängnis (Doom)
- 1959 Verklungen längst die Lieder (Songs Long Faded Away)
- 1927 Verlassenheit (Abandonment)
- 1938 Via mystica
- 1941 Vier Lieder des Hafis (Four Songs of Hafiz)
- 1926 Wenn wie ein leises Flügelbreiten (If such a low wing widens)
- 1940 Wie damals
- 1941 Wie damals
- 1953 Wiegenlied (Lullaby)
- 1917 Wiegenlied (Lullaby)
- 1951 Wiegenlied (Lullaby)
- 1952 Wie schön bist du mein Wien (How Beautiful You Are, My Vienna)
- 1952 Wild Myrtle
- 1940 Wildenten (Wild Ducks)
- 1927 Will dir den Frühling zeigen (Will show you the Spring)
- 1946 Winterlicher Garten (Winter Garden)
- 1925 Wir saßen beide in Gedanken (We sat Deep in Thoughts)
- 1925 Wir wandeln Gott entgegen (We Walk towards God)
- 1927 Wolgaquintett (Volga Quintet)
- 1926 Wunde Liebe (Wound of Love)
- 1953 Wunden (Wounds)
- 1948 Zwei Fenster (Two Windows)
- 1957 Zyklus Wiener Veduten (Views of Vienna. A cycle)
