= Vigilius Blasius Faitelli =

Tyrolean composer and kapellmeister

Vigilius Blasius Faitelli (1710–1768) was a Tyrolean composer and kapellmeister at the Damenstift Church, Hall in Tirol. He is remembered for his three collections of church music; Op.1 Augsburg, undated. Op.2 Octo dulcisona modulamina 1752 printed in the Abbey of Saint Gall, St. Gallen. Op.3. Augsburg, 1754.
