= Johann Baptist Krall =

Austrian composer, conductor and music editor/arranger

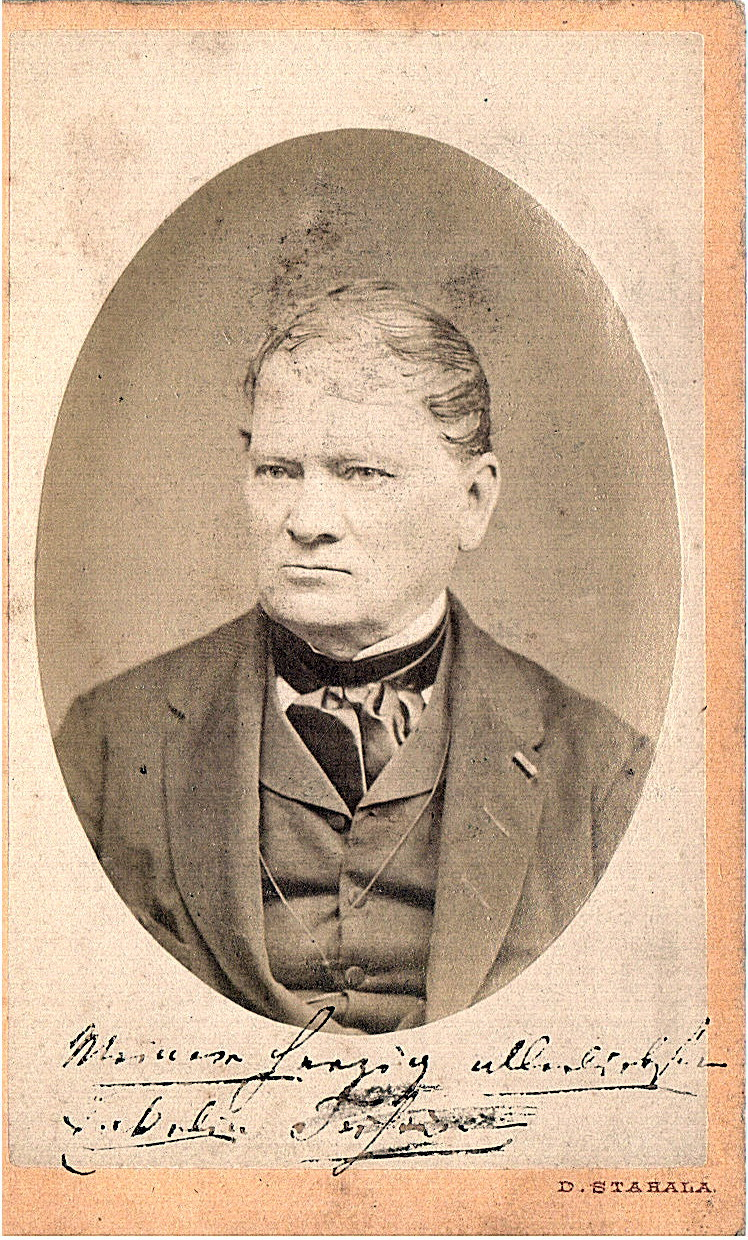
Photo portrait of Johann Baptist Krall (date unknown)

Johann Baptist Krall (1803–4 May 1883) was an Austrian composer, conductor, music editor/arranger, and member of the board of directors of the Wiener Singverein of the Gesellschaft der Musikfreunde.

== Early life ==
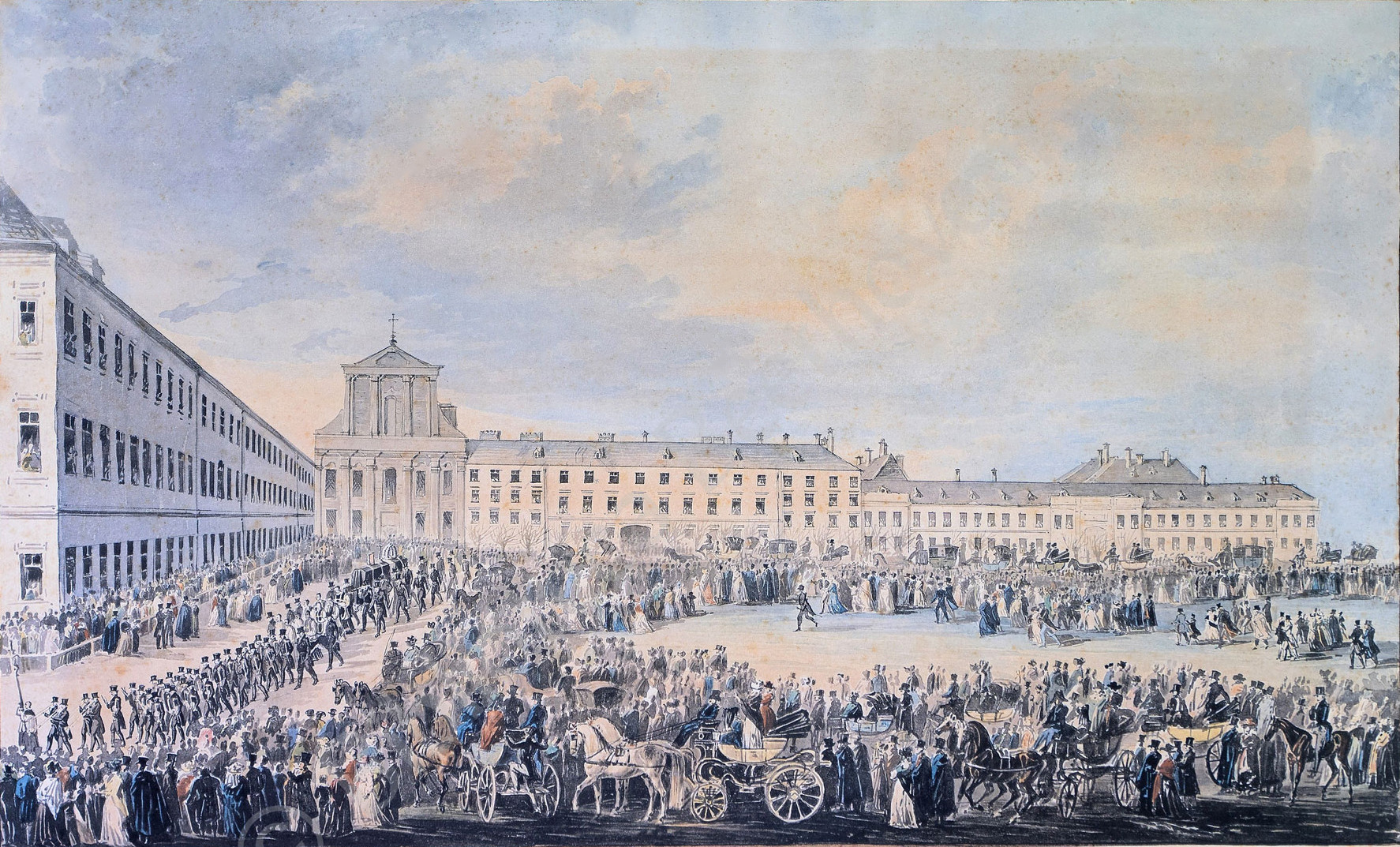
Beethoven's funeral procession. Watercolour by Franz Stöber, 1827.

He was a pupil of the organist and composer de:Joseph Preindl (1756-1823), who succeeded Johann Albrechtsberger as Domkapellmeister at St Stephen's Cathedral, Vienna in 1809; Krall was also a pupil of Preindl's successor Ignaz von Seyfried. An Offertory of Krall's was sung in Vienna in 1825. Johann Krall may be the same Krall who was a dedicatee of the two Concertant Duos for two Violins, Op. 9, by Louis Spohr.

Krall was a torchbearer (Fackelträger) aged c.23 in Beethoven's funeral procession on 29 March 1826, in which his teacher von Seyfried held one of the cords attached to the pall covering Beethoven's coffin.

== Concerts at the Piarist church ==
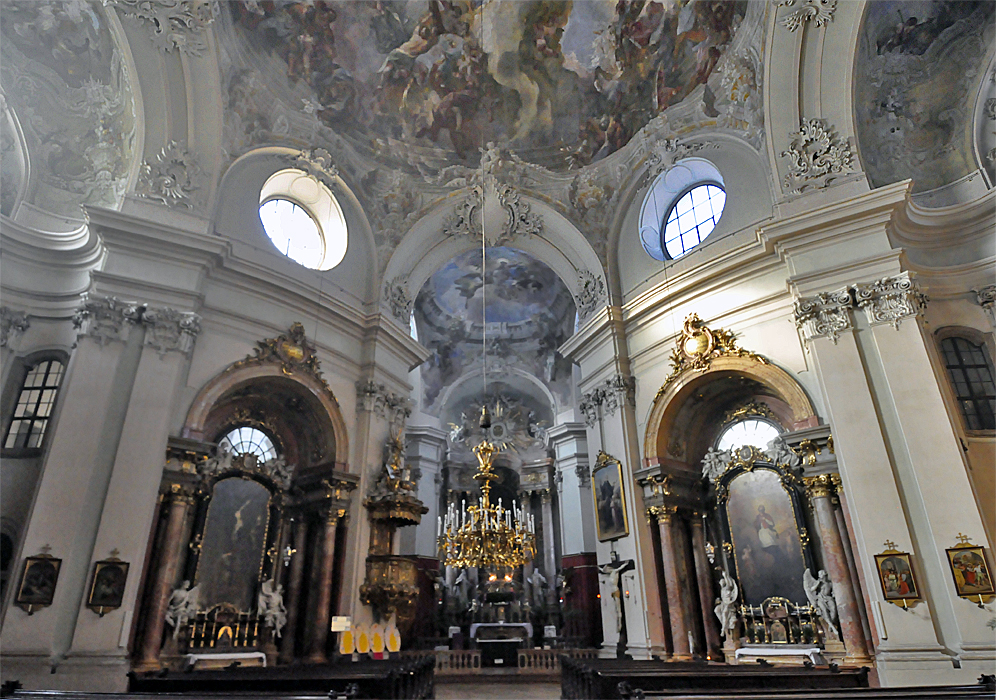
The Piarist Church, Vienna

In early 1845, Krall was the chorus director of the Music Society of the Piarist Church, Vienna ('Piaristenkirche Musikverein'). The church (finished 1758) dedicated to Maria Treu (Faithful Maria) has a long-standing musical tradition because of its excellent acoustics: the Piarists, the oldest Catholic educational order, had commissioned Haydn's Missa in tempore belli, first performed there in 1796. A church musical society ('Musikverein') was first established there in 1828 by Baron Joseph von Blumenthal, who was also the Chordirektor. The high cost of the productions (copying of parts etc.) led to its disbanding in 1834.

A second society founded in 1844 had 200 subscribing members. Krall, as Chordirektor, began with brisk activity and conducted a number of performances. Haydn's Theresienmesse was performed on 1 January 1845, as well as Tantum ergo of Herr Winter, Vias Tuas Domine from de:Joseph Preindl, Krall's teacher, and the Gradual and the duet for tenor and bass Domine exaudi (Psalm 101/102) by Diabelli. The production was certified a "brilliant performance", the soprano solo in the Graduale perceived as "very nice", only an Offertorium of Diabelli inserted into the Haydn Mass was perceived as "inappropriate". On Easter Sunday, 27 April 1848, the Mass in F minor by Bernhard Molique was given. Also sung were an Alleluja by Albrechtsberger and Alma Dei by Hummel.

On 19 January 1845 the service was sung to Mozart's Mass in C with Misericordias Domini, K.222 by Mozart as the Offertorium, and on 26 January 1845, Preindl's C major Mass, Op. 7. On 2 February 1845 Haydn's G major Mass (St. Nicholas) (Hob.XXII:6) was performed along with Krall's own Tantum ergo and Offertorium for bass voice and solo violin. The first performance of Schubert's Mass in G major took place on 9 February 1845, with Schubert's brother Ferdinand at the organ.

On 30 November 1845, the Mass in G Major by Krall was performed under his leadership. A review of the performance called it a melodically very rich, truly ecclesiastical work. The four-part solo Et incarnatus was very wittily conceived, the Benedictus had interesting harmonic effects, the Agnus Dei offered surprising modulations; only the Osanna was not so successful and not adapted to the Church's attitude. Krall's own Tantum ergo and Asperges me by Ferdinand Kloß rounded off the Mass.

Beethoven's Mass in C major, Op. 86, and the Laudate from his oratorio Christ on the Mount of Olives was given on 21 November 1847.

== Re-interment of Beethoven and Schubert ==
Krall became a member of the board of directors of the Wiener Singverein in 1858. In 1863, at the instigation of Krall and Joseph Hellmesberger, Sr., the board of directors of the Gesellschaft der Musik decided to exhume the graves of Schubert and Beethoven in order to prevent further decomposition and at the same time to establish their resting places in a “worthy manner”. On Friday morning, 23 October 1863, the remains of both composers were reburied in newly constructed vaults in the Währing Cemetery.

In February 1867 Krall received the Musikverein's gold service cross from the Duke of Coburg (of the House of Saxe-Coburg-Gotha-Koháry). Krall was made an Honorary Member of the Vienna Gesellschaft der Musikfreunde in 1880.

He died in Vienna.

== Works ==
- Piano sonata (or piano trio). A Selected Sonata for the Piano Forte...with Accompaniments for a Violin & Bass.... by J. B. Krall. London: Napier, n.d. (Note: William Napier (c1740-1812), viola player and music publisher in the Strand. Highfill, P. H. et al. A Biographical Dictionary of Actors, Actresses, Musicians ..., Volume 14, p. 122.)
- Viennese dances for flute (1827) - in a collection published in Vienna by Diabelli & Co., 50 Beliebte Wienertänze für eine Flöte: (first collection) by Josef Lanner, Johann Strauss, Johann Krall, and Franz Schubert.
- Mass in G minor (1826). Performed in 1845. (Note: "Am 30.11.1845 wurde die Messe in G-Dur von Johann Krall unter seiner Leitung aufgeführt." (Krüger 2013, pp. 62))
- Song for voice and piano, Erster Verlust (1828). Words by Goethe, Published by Artaria in Vienna. (Note: Schubert's setting of Erster Verlust is his D226: also the title of No. 16 from Robert Schumann's Album für die Jugend, Op.68.)
- Tantum ergo (performed 1845)
- Offertorium for bass voice and solo violin (performed 1845)
- Ave Maria for two voices and organ (1877).
- Song for voice and piano, Geistliches Lied. Words by Christoph Georg Ludwig Meister. (Note: Christoph Meister (b. 1738), German priest and poet. "Meister, Christoph Georg Ludwig". Allgemeine Deutsche Biographie Vol. 21. [Online edition]. Deutsche Biographie.de. 1885. pp. 253–254.) Included in a collection entitled Huldigung der Tonsetzer Wiens an Elisabeth Kaiserin von Österreich (Homage from the composers of Vienna to Elisabeth Queen of Austria (Vienna, 1854).

== Arrangements ==
Works by Robert Schumann (1810-1856)

Krall made a number of arrangements for solo piano of works by Schumann; they were all published in 1868 and 1869.

- Op. 56, Studies in the Form of Canons for Organ or Pedal piano (Etuden in kanonischer Form für Orgel oder Pedalklavier) (1845)
- Op. 58, Sketches for Organ or Pedal piano (1845)
- Op. 61, Symphony No. 2 in C (1845–46)
- Op. 70, Adagio and Allegro for Horn and piano (1849)
- Op. 73, Fantasy Pieces for Clarinet and Piano (or violin or cello) and Piano (1849)
- Op. 88, Fantasiestücke for piano trio (1842)
- Op. 94, Three Romances for Oboe and Piano (1849)
- Op. 97, Symphony No. 3 in E flat, Rhenish or Cologne (1850)
- Op. 105, Violin Sonata No. 1 in A minor (1851)
- Op. 113, Märchenbilder for piano and viola (1851)

Works by others

- Anton Rubinstein. Viola Sonata, Op.49, arranged for cello and piano by J. B. Krall. Leipzig: Breitkopf und Härtel, n.d.[1892]. Plate V.A.1388.
- Alexander Mackenzie. Six Pieces for violin and piano, Op. 37. Benedictus (No. 3), arranged for cello and piano by J. B. Krall.

== Scores owned by Krall ==
- Schumann, Robert: Drei Gesänge, Op. 31 [1860]. 3rd edition in English, with corrections in red pencil by Krall, who may have been preparing a new English edition...?)
- Ferdinand Hiller: Piano Concerto, op. 54, piano part only (Hiller was the dedicatee of the Schumann piano concerto). Extensively marked up in red crayon, most probably in Krall's hand, possibly for use as a conductor's score; gives dates of composition as 1841, and 1845 for the second movement.
- Carl Debrois von Bruyk: Ballade vom Haideknaben Op. 122, No. 1, text by Friedrich Hebbel (1813-1863), for declamation with piano accompaniment. Leipzig: Senff (Pl.Nr. 92) [1853].

== Family ==
- Family: A certain Krall, London merchant, was his son, whose daughter married Gilbert Young/Holzschuher? director of a machinery factory in Chelmsford; he was the son of Luise Young, Austrian opera singer. (Note: Young, Luise. Biographisches Lexikon des Kaiserthums Oesterreich. Band: 59 ( 1890), ab Seite: 58 (in German). Luise Young's son Gilbert was married to a daughter of the London merchant (unnamed) Krall, a son of the late church musician J. B. Krall (d. 1880) in Vienna. Translation of Young, Luise (German Wikisource): Gustav Young (qv)'s stepsister Luise (born 1825), the youngest sister of Eduard, Friedrich and Joseph Young, was dedicated to singing, made a big singing European tour on many big stages (as in Milan, Barcelona etc.), then went to America, settled in 1870 in New York, where he founded an opera school which she still manages. She also - since her singing voice subsided on the route Philadelphia-San Francisco - chats about Schiller, Goethe, Heine. et al. She was married twice, once with a Herr Kapp, under which Italian-sounding name Kappiani she performed as a singer; the other time she married Herr Holzschuher. This marriage produced two children: a daughter Leopoldine, married to EH Mildmay, official at the British consulate in Milan, and Gilbert (see above).)
- J. B. Krall was perhaps not related to the soprano Frau Janner-Krall, from the Dresdener Royal Theatre c. 1867.
