= Elkan Bauer =

Austrian composer

Elkan Bauer was an Austrian composer and friend and contemporary of Johann Strauss II born in Nikolsburg, on April 4, 1852.

== Biography ==
Despite being unable to neither read nor write music, he whistled melodies which were then transcribed and performed in the outdoor kiosks of Vienna. After being taken prisoner by the Germans in 1942, the Nazis burned all his possessions including his house, his documents and his scores. He was killed in the concentration camp of Theresienstadt at the age of ninety, on September 20, 1942. Miraculously, thanks to a cousin, who had fled with his family to England before the Kristallnacht, there survived two scores of his unpublished musical waltz ("Aeroplane waltz" and "Diana waltz"). The writer Elisa Springer, his maternal granddaughter, who wrote a book, Das Schweigen der Lebenden (The Silence of the Living), preserved these scores.
