= Georg Pasterwitz =

Austrian composer

Georg Pasterwitz, baptized as Robert Johannes Ivo Pasterwitz (7 June 1730 – 26 January 1803) was an Austrian composer and teacher. He was born in Bierhütte, near Passau. First educated at Niederaltaich, he entered the Benedictine monastery in Kremsmünster in 1749. When he took his vows in 1750, he adopted the name "Georg" as his religious name. He then enrolled at the University of Salzburg, studying theology, law and mathematics. It was during this time that he met Johann Ernst Eberlin, who became his music teacher. Pasterwitz completed his studies in 1759 and soon started teaching philosophy at the monastery's Ritterakademie, eventually rising to teach courses in mathematics, physics, economics, and political science; since about 1755 he was also active as composer, producing stage works for the monastery almost every year.

Between 1767 and 1783 Pasterwitz served as the monastery's choir director. Due to reforms started by Joseph II, he had to give up some of his duties and became instead the monastery's treasurer and eventually official representative, when it was threatened with dissolution in 1785. Pasterwitz died in 1803 in Kremsmünster, having served as dean of the Upper School there until 1801. Pasterwitz's surviving oeuvre comprises some 500 works, mostly liturgical pieces and dramatic works for the church. He composed a large number of short contrapuntal pieces for keyboard: 324 were published between 1790 and 1803, and were the only works published during the composer's lifetime. They show him as a competent master of both counterpoint and the keyboard. For the monastery, Pasterwitz regularly composed dramas and dozens of liturgical pieces: masses, offertories, vespers, etc.

== List of works ==
=== Stage ===
- Mardochäus (drama), 1751
- Abul Granatae rex (comedy), 1755
- Jephtias (drama), 1758
- Joas (drama), 1759
- Athamas (Singspiel), 1774
- Samson (Singspiel), 1775
- Il Giuseppe riconosciuto, 1777
- Der wahre Vater, 1782
- other dramatic works

=== Sacred vocal ===
- Requiem (previously attributed to Michael Haydn)
- Terra tremuit for choir and orchestra
- 14 masses, 83 graduals, 85 offertories, 11 vespers, 38 Magnificats, 40 Marian antiphons, 4 litanies, 4 Te Deums, 16 Advent arias, 24 Passion arias

=== Instrumental ===
- [24] Fughe, for organ or harpsichord, opp. 1–3 (Vienna, 1790–92)
- 300 Themata und Versetten, for organ or piano, op. 4 (Vienna, 1803)
- 22 orchestral minuets
- Variations for harpsichord
