= Marcel Tyberg =

Austrian composer, conductor and organist

Marcel Tyberg (27 January 1893, in Vienna – 31 December 1944, in Auschwitz-Birkenau) was an Austrian composer, conductor and organist. His music is late-Romantic in style.

== Biography and career ==
Marcel Tyberg was born into a musical family in Vienna. His father, Marcell Tyberg (Sr.), was a well-known violinist, while his mother, Wanda Paltinger Tybergova, was a pianist in the school of Theodor Leschetizky, and a colleague of Artur Schnabel. Although little is known about his musical education, it is assumed that Tyberg had some formal training in orchestration, counterpoint and harmony outside the family home. Tyberg's father was on good terms with the renowned violinist Jan Kubelik and the two families frequented one another. Marcel dedicated lieder to Jan's two daughters and, despite a twenty-year age gap, cultivated a lifelong friendship with their young brother, the conductor Rafael Kubelik. Tyberg also became friendly with the Italian violinist and conductor, Rodolfo Lipizer. Tyberg's Piano Sonata No. 1 (1920) and his Symphony No. 1 (1924) both date from his time in Vienna.

In 1927, following the death of his father, Tyberg moved with his mother to the town of Abbazia (Opatija), today in Croatia, then part of Italy. To eke out a living, he turned his hand to any work on offer. He taught harmony, played church organs, conducted, and under the pseudonym "Till Bergmar" produced popular dance music for the local resorts (rumbas, tangos and waltzes, etc.).

His Symphony No. 2 was premiered by his friend Rafael Kubelik with the Czech Philharmonic at some time in the early 1930s. A pious Roman Catholic, Tyberg composed a setting of the Te Deum, which was premiered in the expanded church of Abbazia on 25 July 1943, the day Mussolini was forced out of office.

When German forces occupied northern Italy in 1943, Tyberg's mother, in compliance with Nazi regulations, registered that one of her great-grandfathers had been Jewish. Soon after, Tyberg's mother died of natural causes. Subsequently, Tyberg was arrested and deported to the death camps of San Sabba and Auschwitz. It was long believed that he had died by suicide in transit, but the date of his death was recorded in Auschwitz as 31 December 1944.

Tyberg's surviving music, in the form of manuscript scores, was entrusted by him to his friend, Dr. Milan Mihich, and ultimately brought to the United States. Works from this cache have begun to be recorded. These include the Symphony No. 2 (JoAnn Falletta conducting the Buffalo Philharmonic), coupled with the Piano Sonata No. 2 (Fabio Bidini, pianist), on Naxos Records; the Symphony No. 3 (JoAnn Falletta conducting the Buffalo Philharmonic), coupled with the Piano Trio (Michael Ludwig, violinist; Roman Mekinulov, cellist; Ya-Fei Chuang, pianist), on Naxos Records; the two Masses (Brian A. Schmidt conducting the South Dakota Chorale, with Christopher Jacobsen, organist), on Pentatone; the String Sextet with Double Bass (Ensemble Alraune) on NovAntiqua Records (Musica & Regime 3).

The Symphony No. 3 contains in the second movement direct thematic citations and rhythmic over-structures that originate from Hans Rott's Symphony No. 1 and that were also cited by Gustav Mahler's Symphony No. 2 greatly. At current research status it is not known if Tyberg has directly cited Mahler or if he had access via Mahler to Rott's score of his Symphony No. 1, which was kept locked in private by Gustav Mahler, who was a close friend of Rott. Stylistic similarities to Anton Bruckner may be thought, however are not verified by compositional techniques, instrumentation and musical depth. Instead, they are much more related to Rott, who was a scholar of Bruckner and who, by Mahler's words, invented the new symphony.

== Works ==
The known surviving works by Marcel Tyberg include:

Orchestral

- Symphony No. 1 (1922-1924)

Allegro molto (1922) – Adagio (1922) - Scherzo (31 December 1922) – Finale, Allegro non troppo (12 April 1924)

- Scherzo and Finale for Schubert's Unfinished Symphony (1927-1928)
- Symphony No. 2 in F minor (1927-1931)

Allegro appassionato – Adagio – Scherzo – Finale

- Symphony No. 3 in D minor (1938-1943)

Andante Maestoso – Scherzo – Adagio – Rondo

Chamber

- String sextet in F minor, for 2 violins, 2 violas, cello and double bass (1931-1932)

Allegro non troppo – Scherzo – Adagio molto sostenuto (Tema con variationi) – Scherzo – Finale

- Piano Trio in F major (1935-1936)

Allegro maestoso – Adagio non troppo – Rondo

Instrumental

- Piano Sonata No. 1 in B minor (1914-1920)

Allegro appassionato – Larghetto (Tema con variationi) – Rondo

- Piano Sonata No. 2 in F sharp minor (1934-1935)

Allegro con fuoco – Adagio – Scherzo – Finale

- 4 Lieder without words for piano

Sacred

- Mass No. 1, for Soprano, Contralto, Tenor, Bass and organ (1933-1934)
- Mass No. 2, for Soprano, Contralto, Tenor, Basso and organ (1941)

Lieder

- 21 lieder on Heine’s lyric Intermezzo
- Rache, text by Poridzky
- 5 lieder on texts by Daisy von Adelsfeld-Salghetti
- Ave Maria
- 6 Austrian lieder for small orchestra (three orchestrated from the Heine lieder)
- 4 songs in English, texts by Moore and others
- Evening Bells, text by Thomas Moore
- To a Flower, text by Barry Cornwall
- My Heart’s in the Highlands, text by Robert Burns
