= Johann Baptist Peyer =

Austrian organist and composer (c.1678–1733)

- Born: c. 1678
- Died: 10 April 1733; Vienna
- Occupation: Composer
- Era: Baroque

Johann Baptist Peyer, also spelt Bayer or Beyer (c. 1678 – 10 April 1733) was an Austrian organist and composer. He may have been educated at Heiligenkreuz Abbey, where he was organist and music teacher from 1698. From about 1712 he worked for Empress Eleonore, widow of the Holy Roman Emperor Leopold I. After she died in 1720, he worked at the court chapel under Johann Joseph Fux.

== Works ==
- about 100 works for organ or harpsichord (preludes, fugues, capriccios, toccatas)
- partita in C major for harpsichord
- Benedictio Mensae et gratiarum Actio post mensam for choir, strings and organ (with Clemens Scheupflug)
