= Johann Karl Ordonez =

Johann Karl Rochus Ordonez (19 April 1734 – 6 September 1786), also known as Carlo d'Ordonez, was one of a number of composers working in Vienna during the second half of the eighteenth century. Ordonez was not a full-time professional musician. Most of his working life was spent in the employment of the Lower Austrian Regional Court and his musical activities were pursued in his spare time.

Nothing has come to light concerning his general education. Of his musical training we also know nothing although from his contemporary reputation as a violinist it can be inferred that he received lessons from an early age.

Ordonez's professional activities included membership of two prestigious performing bodies: the k.k. Hof- und Kammermusik (where he was employed as a Kammermusikus) and the Tonkünstler-Societät in which he was active both as a violinist and as a composer. Ordonez was an early member of the Tonkuenstler-Societaet, an organization devoted to raising money through public concerts for the widows and orphans of musicians, and maintained a close association from 1771, the year of its foundation, until 1784. Ordonez also performed regularly in the houses of the nobility. Dr Charles Burney heard him play at a musical dinner party in 1772 held in the residence of the British Ambassador in Vienna, Lord Stormont:

Between the vocal parts of this delightful concert, we had some exquisite quartets, by Haydn, executed in the utmost perfection; the first violin by M. Startzler (J. Starzer), who played the Adagios with uncommon feeling and expression; the second violin by M. Ordonetz; Count Bruehl played the tenor, and M. Weigel (F.J. Weigl), an excellent performer on the violoncello, the base. All who had any share in this concert, finding the company attentive, and in a disposition to be pleased, were animated to that true pitch of enthusiasm, which, from the ardour of the fire within them, is communicated to others, and sets all around in a blaze; so that the contention between the performers and hearers, was only who should please, and who should applaud the most!

Ill health forced Ordonez to resign both his professional playing appointments in 1783. The same year he was forced to retire on half-salary from his position with the Lower Austrian Land Court, a circumstance which caused him great financial distress. The last three years of Ordonez's life were spent in sickness and poverty. At the time of his death from pulmonary tuberculosis, Ordonez was living a hand-to-mouth existence in shared lodgings. He possessed only a few items of clothing and his total estate, including outstanding pension payments, was valued at less than the cost of his funeral. The outstanding balance was paid by his son-in-law, Joseph Niedlinger, a minor government official in the Upper Building Management Division of the court.

For a part-time composer Ordonez was surprisingly prolific. In addition to his two operatic works – a marionette opera, Musica della Parodie d'Alceste and a Singspiel, Diesmal hat der Mann den Willen – Ordonez is known to have composed a significant amount of church music (now lost), a secular cantata, 73 symphonies, a violin concerto and a large corpus of chamber music of which the 27 authenticated string quartets are of particular importance. Ordonez's sophisticated experiments with cyclic unity and his liking for contrapuntal textures gives much of his music a very distinctive and original quality. His symphonies were widely disseminated in manuscript copies and Abbé Stadler noted that they "received great applause". In particular his opus 1 string quartets are credited as containing "some of the most sophisticated pre-19th-century techniques of cyclic unification."

== See also ==
=== Works ===
- List of works by Johann Karl von Ordonez
