= List of compositions by Franz Schubert (1815) =

Franz Schubert's compositions of 1815 are mostly in the Deutsch catalogue (D) range D 127–330, and include:

- Instrumental works:
  - Symphony No. 3, D 200
  - String Quartet No. 9, D 173
  - Piano Sonata in E major, D 157
  - Piano Sonata in C major, D 279
- Vocal music:
  - Der vierjährige Posten, D 190
  - Die Freunde von Salamanka, D 326
  - Mass No. 2, D 167
  - Mass No. 3, D 324
  - Stabat Mater in G minor, D 175
  - "Schwertlied", D 170
  - "An die Freude", D 189
  - "Rastlose Liebe", D 138
  - "Der Mondabend", D 141
  - "An Mignon", D 161
  - "Wandrers Nachtlied", D 224
  - "Heidenröslein", D 257
  - "Vaterlandslied", D 287
  - "Sehnsucht", D 310
  - "Mignon", D 321
  - "Hermann und Thusnelda", D 322
  - "Harfenspieler", D 325
  - "Erlkönig", D 328

== Table ==
=== Legend ===
Legend to the table
column		content
1	D '51	Deutsch number in the first version of the Deutsch catalogue (1951)
2	D utd	most recent (utd = up to date) Deutsch catalogue number; the basic collation of the list is according to these numbers – whether or not the possibility to adjust the sorting according to the content of other columns is available depends on the device with which the table is displayed.
3	Op. pbl	Opus number (Op.; p indicates Post. = posthumous) and date of first publication (pbl; between brackets; when there is more than one date the earlier dates indicate partial publications). The column sorts to Opus number, then (earliest of) the publication date(s)
4	AGA	Alte Gesamt-Ausgabe = Franz Schubert's Werke: Kritisch durchgesehene Gesammtausgabe. Indicates genre/instrumentation: Series I: Symphonien (Nos. 1-8) (Johannes Brahms, 1884); Series II: Overtüren und Andere Orchesterwerke (Johann Nepomuk Fuchs, 1886); Series III: Oktette (Nos. 1-3) and IV: Streichquintett (Eusebius Mandyczewski, 1889); Series V: Streichquartette (Nos. 1-15) (Joseph Hellmesberger and Eusebius Mandyczewski, 1890); Series VI: Trio für Streichinstrumente (Eusebius Mandyczewski, 1892); Series VII: Trios, Quartets and Quintets with Piano and VIII: Pianoforte und Ein Instrument (Ignaz Brüll, 1886); Series IX: Pianoforte zu vier Händen (Anton Door, 1888); Series X: Sonaten für Pianoforte (Julius Epstein, 1888); Series XI: Fantasie, Impromptus und andere Stücke für Pianoforte (Julius Epstein, 1888); Series XII: Tänze für Pianoforte (Nos. 1-31) (Julius Epstein, 1889); Series XIII: Messen (Nos. 1-7) (Eusebius Mandyczewski, 1887); Series XIV: Kleinere Kirchenmusikwerke (Nos. 1-22) (Eusebius Mandyczewski, 1888); Series XV: Dramatische Musik (Johann Nepomuk Fuchs, 1893); Series XVI: Werke für Männerchor (Nos. 1-46) (Eusebius Mandyczewski, 1891); Series XVII: Werke für gemischten Chor (Nos. 1-19) (Josef Gänsbacher, Eusebius Mandyczewski, 1892); Series XVIII: Werke für Drei und mehr Frauenstimmen mit Pianoforte-Begleitung (Nos. 1-6) (Josef Gänsbacher, Eusebius Mandyczewski, 1891); Series XIX: Kleine Gesangswerke (Nos. 1-36) (Josef Gänsbacher and Eusebius Mandyczewski, 1892); Series XX: Sämtliche einstimmige Lieder und Gesänge (Eusebius Mandyczewski, 1894-1895); Series XXI: Supplement (Eusebius Mandyczewski, 1897); 1. Instrumentalmusik No. 1-5; 2. Instrumentalmusik No. 6-13; 3. Instrumentalmusik No. 14-; 4. Gesangsmusik; Series XXII: Revisionsbericht
5	NSA	NGA/NSA/NSE = New Schubert Edition, also indicates genre/instrumentation: Series I: Church Music; Series II: Stage Works; Series III: Part Songs; Series IV: Lieder; Series V: Orchestral Works; Series VI: Chamber Music; 1. Octet and Nonet; 2. String Quintet; 3. String Quartets I; 4. String Quartets II; 5. String Quartets III; 6. String Trios; 7. Works for Piano and several instruments; 8. Works for Piano and one instrument; 9. Dances for several instruments; Series VII: Piano Music; 1. Works for Piano Four Hands; 2. Works for Piano Two Hands; Series VIII: Supplement, 2. Schubert's Studies
6	Name	unique name, with, if available, a link to the relevant encyclopedia article; sorts by name with initial definite ("Der", "Die", "Das", ...) or indefinite ("Ein", "A", ...) articles, and numbers, moved after the expression they qualify: e.g. "Die Hoffnung, ..." sorts as "Hoffnung, Die, ..." – "Thirty Minuets ..." sorts as "Minuets, 30, ...".
7	Key / incipit	incipit mostly for songs (linking to lyrics and their translation, for instance at The LiederNet Archive, when available), other compositions by key, except for Schubert's stage works: type of composition in brackets.
8	Date	(presumed) date of composition, or, for copies and arrangements, date of Schubert's autograph. Sorts to earliest possible date of completion, unlike the chronology of the Deutsch catalogue that generally collates according to earliest date associated with the composition: e.g. Schubert started the composition of his 3rd String Quartet on 19 November 1812 and completed it on 21 February 1813 – in the Deutsch catalogue the composition is grouped with other compositions from 1812: when using the sort function of the 8th column the composition is grouped with compositions completed in 1813
9	Additional info	may include: Information about the text (lyrics, libretto) of vocal compositions: e.g., "Text by [text author]", "Text: [standard lyrics]", "... from [literary work]"; "other settings: D ..." indicates Schubert's other settings of the same text; for fields starting with "Text ..." this column sorts by text author (last name, first name—or pen name when such name is more established), then incipit of the lyrics (alternatively, when the incipit is rarely used, title of the work); Information about the authenticity of the composition: the work is without doubt Schubert's unless when marked as "Doubtful", "Spurious?" or "Spurious" (in the last case columns 3–8 give no further information about the composition); Forces needed for performance ("For ..."): may be omitted when the type of composition makes the instrumentation clear (e.g. String Quartet → two violins, viola and cello), and, for vocal music, when the setting is for voice and piano; "s", "a", "t" and "b" refer to a single soprano, alto, tenor and bass singer respectively, while "S", "A", "T" and "B" to choral parts for the same types of singers (see SATB).; Specifications regarding movements (e.g. "Allegro – Minuet – Rondo") or sections (e.g. "No. 1 ..."); Information about the completeness of the extant work: the work is considered complete as extant unless when marked "Sketch", "Incomplete", "Unfinished", "Fragment" or "Lost"; Information about versions (e.g. "Two versions: ...")

=== List ===
Compositions by Franz Schubert listed in the Deutsch catalogue for 1815
D '51	D utd	Op. pbl	AGA	NSA	Name	Key / incipit	Date	Additional info
128	128	(1897)	XXI, 3 No. 23	VII/2, 6	Twelve Viennese German Dances	Various keys	1812?	For piano; Includes introduction; No. 12 related to D 32
129	129	(1892)	XIX; No. 16	III, 4 No. 18	Mailied, D 129	Grüner wird die Au	1815?	Text by Hölty (other settings: D 199 and 503); For ttb
130	130	(1892)	XIX; No. 25	III, 4 No. 19; VIII, 2 No. 24	Der Schnee Zerrinnt	Der Schnee Zerrinnt	1815?	Text by Hölty (other setting: D 202); Canon for three voices
131	131	(1892)	XIX; No. 28	III, 4 No. 20; VIII, 2 No. 26	Lacrimoso son io	Lacrimoso son io	1815?	Canon for three voices; Two versions: 2nd is "Lacrimosa son io"
134	134	126p (1830)	XX, 2 No. 99	IV, 7 No. 21	Ballade	Ein Fräulein schaut vom hohen Turm	1815?	Text by Kenner
135	135	(1930)		VII/2, 6	German Dance with Trio, D 135	E major	1815	For piano; Variant of D 146 No. 3 (other Trio)
136	136	46 (1825)	XIV No. 1	I, 8	Offertory, D 136, a.k.a. Offertory No. 1	Totus in corde langueo C major	1815?	For s or t, clarinet or violin, and orchestra
137	137	(1893)	XV, 7 No. 14	II, 12	Adrast	(Singspiel)	fall 1819– early 1820	Text by Mayrhofer; For stbTTBB and orchestra; Nos. 1–8 complete (abandoned variants for some numbers, Nos. 1–7 in AGA) and sketches and fragments for six further numbers; Overture: D 648?
138	138	5,1 (1821) (1970)	XX, 3 No. 177	IV, 1a & b No. 6	Rastlose Liebe	Dem Schnee, dem Regen, dem Wind entgegen	19/5/1815– May 1821	Text by Goethe; Two versions: 1st, in AGA, is Op. 5 No. 1
139	139	(1930)		VII/2, 6	German Dance with Trio, D 139	C♯ major (Trio in A major)	1815	For piano
140	140	(1850)	XVIII; No. 6	III, 3 No. 3	Klage um Ali Bey, D 140	Laßt mich! laßt mich! ich will klagen	1815	Text by Claudius (other setting: D 496A); For ttb (and piano?)
141	141	131p,1 (1830)	XX, 2 No. 43	IV, 7 No. 23	Der Mondabend	Rein und freundlich lacht der Himmel	1815	Text by Kumpf
142	142	92,3 (1828) (1885) (1895)	XX, 3 No. 174	IV, 5	Geistes-Gruß	Hoch auf dem alten Turme steht	before Apr. 1816– after Nov. 1821	Text by Goethe; Six versions: 2nd publ. in 1885 – 3rd and 5th not in AGA – 6th is Op. 92 No. 3
143	143	109p,2 (1829)	XX, 3 No. 181	IV, 7 No. 24	Genügsamkeit	Dort raget ein Berg aus den Wolken her	1815	Text by Schober; Intro in 1st ed. not by Schubert
144	144	(1895)	XXII, 11; No. 209	IV, 7 Anh. No. 9	Romanze, D 144	In der Väter Hallen ruhte	April 1816	Text by Stolberg-Stolberg; Fragment
145	145	18 (1823)	XII; No. 2	VII/2, 6 & 7a	12 Waltzes, 17 Ländler and 9 Écossaises, D 145	Various keys	c. 1815– July 1821	For piano; Waltz No. 7 ≈ D 970 No. 2; Écossaises Nos. 5 and 6 identical to D 421 No. 1 and 697 No. 5
146	146	127p (1824) (1830)	XII; No. 8	VII/2, 6 & 7a	20 Waltzes, D 146, a.k.a. Letzte Walzer	Various keys	1815– Feb. 1823	For piano; No. 2 publ. in 1824, all 20 as Op. posth. 127 in 1830
147	147	(1892)	XIX; No. 15	III, 4 No. 21	Bardengesang	Rolle, du strömigter Carun	20/1/1816?	Text by Macpherson (Ossian), from Comala, transl. by E. Baron de Harold
148	148	131p,2 (1830)	XIX; No. 8	III, 3 No. 4	Trinklied, D 148	Brüder! unser Erdenwallen	February; 1815	Text by Castelli; For tTTB and piano
149	149	117p (1829) (1894)	XX, 2 No. 45	IV, 7 No. 25	Der Sänger	Was hör' ich draußen vor dem Tür	February; 1815	Text by Goethe, from Wilhelm Meister's Apprenticeship; Two versions: 2nd is Op. posth. 117, AGA switches 1st and 2nd
150	150	(1830)	XX, 2 No. 44	IV, 7 No. 26	Lodas Gespenst	Der bleiche, kalte Mond erhob sich im Osten	17/1/1816	Text by Macpherson (Ossian), from Carric-thura, transl. by E. Baron de Harold; 1st ed. replaces end by music from D 277
151	151	(1850)	XX, 2 No. 39	IV, 7 No. 27	Auf einen Kirchhof	Sei gegrüßt, geweihte Stille	2/2/1815	Text by Schlechta
152	152	(1894)	XX, 2 No. 40	IV, 7 No. 28	Minona	Wie treiben die Wolken so finster und schwer	8/2/1815	Text by Bertrand
153	153	(1845)	XX, 2 No. 41	IV, 7 No. 29	Als ich sie erröten sah	All mein Wirken, all mein Leben	10/2/1815	Text by Ehrlich
154	154	(1897)	XXI, 2 No. 8	VII/2, 1 Anh. No. 1	Piano Sonata, D 154	E major	11/2/1815	Allegro (fragment); Partly reused in D 157
155	155	165p,3 (1862)	XX, 2 No. 42	IV, 7 No. 30	Das Bild	Ein Mädchen ist's	10/2/1815	
156	156	(1887)	XI No. 6	VII/2, 4 & Anh.	Ten Variations, D 156	F major	completed 15/2/1815	For piano; Variant of Theme and Var. II
157	157	(1888)	X No. 1	VII/2, 1 No. 1	Piano Sonata, D 157	E major	started 18/2/1815	Allegro ma non troppo (partly reuses D 154) – Andante – Minuet
158	158	(1889)	XII; No. 29	VII/2, 6	Écossaise, D 158	D minor – F major	21/2/1815	For piano
159	159	116p (1829) (1968)	XX, 2 No. 46	IV, 7 No. 31	Die Erwartung	Hör' ich das Pförtchen nicht gehen?	May 1816	Text by Schiller; Two versions: 2nd, in AGA, is Op. posth. 116
160	160	(1894)	XX, 2 No. 47	IV, 13	Am Flusse, D 160	Verfließet, vielgeliebte Lieder	27/2/1815	Text by Goethe (other setting: D 766)
161	161	19,2 (1825) (1894)	XX, 2 No. 48	IV, 1a & b No. 14	An Mignon	Über Tal und Fluß getragen	27/2/1815	Text by Goethe; Two versions: 2nd is Op. 19 No. 2
162	162	5,2 (1821) (1894)	XX, 2 No. 49	IV, 1a & Anh. No. 2	Nähe des Geliebten	Ich denke dein, wenn mir der Sonne Schimmer	27/2/1815	Text by Goethe; Two versions: 2nd is Op. 5 No. 2
163	163	(1894)	XX, 2 No. 50	IV, 8 No. 1	Sängers Morgenlied, D 163	Süßes Licht! Aus goldnen Pforten	27/2/1815	Text by Körner (other setting: D 165)
164	164			IV, 8 Anh. No. 1	Liebesrausch, D 164	Glanz des Guten und des Schönen strahlt mir dein hohes Bild	March 1815	Text by Körner (other setting: D 179); Fragment
165	165	(1872)	XX, 2 No. 51	IV, 8 No. 2	Sängers Morgenlied, D 165	Süßes Licht! Aus goldnen Pforten	1/3/1815	Text by Körner (other setting: D 163)
166	166	(1894)	XX, 2 No. 52	IV, 8 No. 3	Amphiaraos	Vor Thebens siebenfach gähnenden Toren	1/3/1815	Text by Körner
167	167	(1846)	XIII, 1 No. 2	I, 1b	Mass No. 2	G major Kyrie – Gloria – Credo – Sanctus & Benedictus – Agnus Dei	2/3/1815– 7/3/1815	Text: Mass ordinary (other settings: D 24E, 31, 45, 49, 56, 66, 105, 324, 452, 678, 755 and 950); For stbSATB and orchestra; Tr and Ti added by Ferd. Schubert; R. Führer as composer in 1st publ.
168	168	(1872)	XVII; No. 16	III, 2a No. 2	Nun laßt uns den Leib begraben, a.k.a. Begräbnislied	Begrabt den Leib in seiner Gruft	9/3/1815	Text by Klopstock; For SATB and piano
987	168A	(1872)	XVII; No. 17	III, 2a No. 3	Jesus Christus unser Heiland, der den Tod überwand, a.k.a. Osterlied	Überwunden hat der Herr den Tod!	9/3/1815	Text by Klopstock; For SATB and piano
169	169	(1894)	XX, 2 No. 53	III, 3 No. 10; Anh. I No. 1	Trinklied vor der Schlacht	Schlacht, du brichst an!	12/3/1815	Text by Körner; For double unison choir and piano
170	170	(1873)	XX, 2 No. 54	III, 3 No. 11	Schwertlied	Du Schwert an meiner Linken	12/3/1815	Text by Körner; For voice, unison choir and piano
171	171	(1831)	XX, 2 No. 55	IV, 8 No. 4	Gebet während der Schlacht	Vater, ich rufe dich!	12/3/1815	Text by Körner
172	172			IV, 8 Anh. No. 3	Der Morgenstern, D 172	Stern der Liebe, Glanzgebilde	12/3/1815	Text by Körner (other setting: D 203); Fragment
173	173	(1871)	V No. 9	VI, 4 No. 11	String Quartet No. 9	G minor	25/3/1815– 1/4/1815	Allegro con brio – Andantino – Minuet – Allegro
174	174	(1845)	XX, 2 No. 56	IV, 8 No. 5	Das war ich, D 174	Jüngst träumte mir	26/3/1815	Text by Körner; D. 174 used to include Das war ich, D deest
174	deest	(1894)	XXII, 11; No. 56	IV, 8 Anh. No. 2	Das war ich, D deest		June 1816	Fragment; Music without text, title identical to D 174
175	175	(1888)	XIV; No. 12	I, 9 No. 1	Stabat Mater, D 175	G minor Stabat Mater dolorosa	4/4/1815– 6/4/1815	For SATB and orchestra
176	176	(1872)	XX, 2 No. 57	IV, 8 No. 6	Die Sterne, D 176	Was funkelt ihr so mild mich an	6/4/1815	Text by Fellinger
177	177	173p,3 (1867)	XX, 2 No. 58	IV, 8 No. 7	Vergebliche Liebe	Ja, ich weiß es, diese treue Liebe	6/4/1815	Text by Bernard
	177A			VIII, 3	Am ersten Mai	Ich ging mit ihr im Freien	before 1821	Text by Bernard; Music lost; Spurious?
178	178	(1897)	XXI, 3 No. 22	VII/2, 4 & Anh.	Adagio in G major, D 178	G major	8/4/1815	For piano; Two versions: 2nd is a fragment
179	179	(1872)	XX, 2 No. 59	IV, 8 No. 8	Liebesrausch, D 179	Dir, Mädchen, schlägt mit leisem Beben	8/4/1815	Text by Körner; (other setting: D 164)
180	180	(1894)	XX, 2 No. 60	IV, 8 No. 9	Sehnsucht der Liebe	Wie die Nacht mit heil'gem Beben	8/4/1815	Text by Körner
181	181	(1888)	XIV No. 4	I, 9 No. 2	Offertory, D 181	Tres sunt, qui testimonium dant in coelo A minor	10/4/1815– 11/4/1815	For SATB and orchestra
182	182	(1842)	XX, 2 No. 61	IV, 8 No. 10	Die erste Liebe	Die erste Liebe füllt das Herz	12/4/1815	Text by Fellinger
183	183	(1887)	XX, 2 No. 62	III, 3 No. 12	Trinklied, D 183	Ihr Freunde und du, gold'ner Wein	12/4/1815	Text by Zettler; For voice, unison choir and piano
184	184	150p (1843)	XIV No. 5	I, 9 No. 3	Gradual, D 184	Benedictus es, Domine; C major	15/4/1815– 17/4/1815	For SATB and orchestra
185	105							See D 105
186	186	(1894)	XX, 2 No. 65	IV, 8 No. 11	Die Sterbende	Heil! dies ist die letze Zähre	May 1815	Text by Matthisson
187	187	(1894)	XX, 2 No. 63	IV, 10	Stimme der Liebe, D 187	Abendgewölke schweben hell	May 1815	Text by Matthisson (other setting: D 418)
188	188	(1887)	XX, 2 No. 64	IV, 8 No. 12	Naturgenuß, D 188	Im Abendschimmer wallt der Quell	May 1815	Text by Matthisson (other setting: D 422)
189	189	111p,1 (1829)	XX, 2 No. 66	III, 3 No. 13	An die Freude	Freude, schöner Götterfunken	May 1815	Text by Schiller; For voice, unison choir and piano
190	190	(1888)	XV, 2 No. 2	II, 2 IV, 14	Der vierjährige Posten	(Singspiel in one act); Includes: 5. Gott! Gott! höre meine Stimme	8/5/1815– 19/5/1815	Text by Körner; Music for stttbSATB and orchestra; Overture – Nos. 1–8 (No. 5 also for voice and piano)
191	191	58,3 (1826) (1894)	XX, 2 No. 67	IV, 3	Des Mädchens Klage, D 191	Der Eichwald brauset	15/5/1815	Text by Schiller, from Wallenstein: Die Piccolomini III, 7 (other settings: D 6 and 389); Two versions: 2nd is Op. 58 No. 3
192	192	(1887)	XX, 2 No. 68	IV, 4	Der Jüngling am Bache, D 192	An der Quelle saß der Knabe	15/5/1815	Text by Schiller (other settings: D 30 and 638)
193	193	57,3 (1826)	XX, 2 No. 69	IV, 3	An den Mond, D 193	Geuß, lieber Mond, geuß deine Silberflimmer	17/5/1815	Text by Hölty; Autograph without piano intro
194	194	(1894)	XX, 2 No. 70	IV, 8 No. 13	Die Mainacht	Wann der silberne Mond	17/5/1815	Text by Hölty
195	195	173p,1 (1867)	XX, 2 No. 71	IV, 8 No. 14	Amalia	Schön wie Engel voll Walhallas Wonne	19/5/1815	Text by Schiller, from Die Räuber III, 1
196	196	172p,3 (1865)	XX, 2 No. 72	IV, 8 No. 15	An die Nachtigall	Geuß nicht so laut der liebentflammten Lieder	22/5/1815	Text by Hölty
197	197	(1850)	XX, 2 No. 73	IV, 8 No. 16	An die Apfelbäume, wo ich Julien erblickte	Ein heilig Säuseln und ein Gesangeston	22/5/1815	Text by Hölty
198	198	(1894)	XX, 2 No. 74	IV, 8 No. 17	Seufzer	Die Nachtigall singt überall	22/5/1815	Text by Hölty
199	199	(1885)	XIX; No. 30	III, 4 No. 22	Mailied, D 199	Grüner wird die Au	24/5/1815	Text by Hölty (other settings: D 129 and 503); For two voices or two horns
200	200	(1884)	I, 1 No. 3	V, 1 No. 3	Symphony No. 3	D major	24/5/1815– 19/6/1815	Adagio maestoso, Allegro con brio – Allegretto – Minuet – Presto vivace
201	201	(1970)		IV, 10	Auf den Tod einer Nachtigall, D 201	Sie ist dahin, die Maienlieder tönte	25/5/1815	Text by Hölty (other setting: D 399); Fragment
202	202	(1885)	XIX; No. 31	III, 4 No. 23	Mailied, D 202	Der Schnee Zerrinnt	26/5/1815	Text by Hölty (other setting: D 130); For two voices or two horns
203	203	(1892)	XIX; No. 32	III, 4 No. 24	Der Morgenstern, D 203	Stern der Liebe, Glanzgebilde	26/5/1815	Text by Körner (other setting: D 172); For two voices or two horns
204	204	(1892)	XIX; No. 33	III, 4 No. 25	Jägerlied	Frisch auf, ihr Jäger	26/5/1815	Text by Körner; For two voices or two horns
	204A			IV, 8 Anh. No. 4	Das Traumbild		May 1815	Text by Hölty; Music lost
205	205	(1892)	XIX; No. 34	III, 4 No. 26	Lützows wilde Jagd	Was glänzt dort vom Walde im Sonnenschein?	26/5/1815	Text by Körner; For two voices or two horns
206	206	(1872)	XX, 2 No. 75	IV, 8 No. 18	Liebeständelei	Süßes Liebchen	26/5/1815	Text by Körner
207	207	(1894)	XX, 2 No. 76	IV, 8 No. 19	Der Liebende	Beglückt, beglückt	29/5/1815	Text by Hölty
208; 212	208	(1895) (1897)	XX, 2 No. 77; XXII, 11; No. 77	IV, 8 No. 20 & Anh. No. 5	Die Nonne	Es liebt' in Welschland irgendwo	29/5/1815	Text by Hölty, from Balladen, No. 5; Two versions: 1st is fragment, incomplete in AGA – 2nd was D 212
209	209	38 (1825)	XX, 2 No. 98	IV, 2a	Der Liedler	Gib, Schwester, mir die Harf herab	January 1815	Text by Kenner
210	210	(1838)	XX, 2 No. 78	IV, 8 No. 21	Die Liebe, D 210, a.k.a. Klärchens Lied	Freudvoll und leidvoll	3/6/1815	Text by Goethe, from Egmont, Act III, Scene 2, Clärchen's song
211	211	(1894)	XX, 2 No. 79	IV, 8 No. 22	Adelwold und Emma	Hoch und ehern schier von Dauer	5/6/1815– 14/6/1815	Text by Bertrand
212	208							See D 208
213	213	172p,1 (1865)	XX, 2 No. 80	IV, 8 No. 23	Der Traum	Mir träumt', ich war ein Vögelein	17/6/1815	Text by Hölty, from Balladen, No. 6
214	214	172p,2 (1865)	XX, 2 No. 81	IV, 8 No. 24	Die Laube	Nimmer werd' ich, nimmer dein vergessen	17/6/1815	Text by Hölty
215	215	(1906)		IV, 1b No. 4	Jägers Abendlied, D 215	Im Felde schleich ich, still und wild	20/6/1815	Text by Goethe (other setting: D 368)
216	215A	(1952)		IV, 1a & b No. 3	Meeres Stille, D 215A	Tiefe Stille herrscht im Wasser	20/6/1815	Text by Goethe (other setting: D 216)
216	216	3,2 (1821)	XX, 2 No. 82	IV, 1a	Meeres Stille, D 216	Tiefe Stille herrscht im Wasser	21/6/1815	Text by Goethe (other setting: D 215A)
217	217	(1830)	XX, 2 No. 83	IV, 8 No. 25	Kolmas Klage	Rund um mich Nacht	22/6/1815	Text by Macpherson (Ossian), from The Songs of Selma (transl.)
218	218	(1848)	XX, 2 No. 84	IV, 8 No. 26	Grablied	Er fiel den Tod für's Vaterland	24/6/1815	Text by Kenner
219	219	(1848)	XX, 2 No. 85	IV, 8 No. 27	Das Finden	Ich hab ein Mädchen funden	25/6/1815	Text by Kosegarten
220	220	(1888)	XV, 2 No. 3	II, 2	Fernando	(Singspiel in one act)	Jun. 1815– 9/7/1815	Text by Stadler, A.; Music for sstbb and orchestra; Nos. 1–7
221	221	118p,2 (1829)	XX, 2 No. 95	IV, 8 No. 28	Der Abend, D 221	Der Abend blüht, Temora glüht	15/7/1815	Text by Kosegarten
222	222	(1885)	XX, 2 No. 86	IV, 8 No. 29	Lieb Minna: Romanze	Schwüler Hauch weht mir herüber	2/7/1815	Text by Stadler, A.
223	223	47 (1825)	XIV No. 2	I, 8	Salve Regina, D 223, a.k.a. Offertory No. 2	F major Salve Regina	5/7/1815; 28/1/1823	Text: Salve Regina (other settings: D 27, 106, 386, 676 and 811); For s and orchestra; Two versions: 2nd, in AGA, is Op. 47
224	224	4,3 (1821)	XX, 2 No. 87	IV, 1a	Wandrers Nachtlied, D 224	Der du von dem Himmel bist	5/7/1815	Text by Goethe
225	225	5,3 (1821) (1970)	XX, 2 No. 88	IV, 1a & b No. 7	Der Fischer	Das Wasser rauscht', das Wasser schwoll	5/7/1815	Text by Goethe; Two versions: 2nd, in AGA, is Op. 5 No. 3
226	226	5,4 (1821)	XX, 2 No. 89	IV, 1a	Erster Verlust	Ach, wer bringt die schönen Tage	5/7/1815	Text by Goethe
227	227	(1885)	XX, 2 No. 90	IV, 8 No. 30	Idens Nachtgesang	Vernimm es Nacht, was Ida dir vertrauet	7/7/1815	Text by Kosegarten
228	228	(1894)	XX, 2 No. 91	IV, 8 No. 31	Von Ida	Der Morgen blüht, der Osten glüht	7/7/1815	Text by Kosegarten
229	229	108,3 (1824)	XX, 2 No. 92	IV, 5	Die Erscheinung, a.k.a. Erinnerung, D 229	Ich lag auf grünen Matten	7/7/1815	Text by Kosegarten; Publ. as Op. 108 No. 3 in 1829
230	230	165p,4 (1855)	XX, 2 No. 93	IV, 8 No. 32	Die Täuschung	Im Erlenbusch, im Tannenhain	7/7/1815	Text by Kosegarten; Publ. as Op. posth. 165 No. 4 in 1862
231	231	172p,4 (1865)	XX, 2 No. 94	IV, 8 No. 33	Das Sehnen	Wehmut, die mich hüllt	8/7/1815	Text by Kosegarten
232	232	112p,3 (1829)	XVII; No. 8	III, 2a No. 6; 2b Anh. No. 2	Hymne an den Unendlichen	Zwischen Himmel und Erd'	11/7/1815	Text by Schiller; For satb and piano
233	233	118p,1 (1829)	XX, 2 No. 96	IV, 8 No. 34	Geist der Liebe, D 233	Wer bist du, Geist der Liebe	15/7/1815	Text by Kosegarten
234	234	118p,3 (1829)	XX, 2 No. 97	IV, 8 No. 35	Tischlied	Mich ergreift, ich weiß nicht wie	15/7/1815	Text by Goethe
235	235	(1894)	XX, 2 No. 100	IV, 8 No. 36	Abends unter der Linde, D 235	Woher, o namenloses Sehnen	24/7/1815	Text by Kosegarten (other setting: D 237)
236	236	(1892)	XIX; No. 6	III, 2a No. 7	Das Abendrot, D 236	Der Abend blüht, der Westen glüht!	20/7/1815	Text by Kosegarten; for ssb and piano
237	237	(1872)	XX, 2 No. 101	IV, 8 No. 37	Abends unter der Linde, D 237	Woher, o namenloses Sehnen	25/7/1815	Text by Kosegarten (other setting: D 235)
238	238	(1894)	XX, 2 No. 102	IV, 8 No. 38	Die Mondnacht	Siehe, wie die Mondesstrahlen	25/7/1815	Text by Kosegarten
239	239	(1893)	XV, 7 No. 11	II, 14	Claudine von Villa Bella	(Singspiel in three acts)	started 26/7/1815	Text by Goethe; For ssttbbSATB and orchestra; Overture (in AGA) – Nos. 1–8 (Act I, in AGA) – No. 9 (fragment from Act II) – No. 10 (fragment from Act III); Other music lost
240	240	(1894)	XX, 2 No. 103	IV, 8 No. 39	Huldigung	Ganz verloren, ganz versunken	27/7/1815	Text by Kosegarten
241	241	(1894)	XX, 2 No. 104	IV, 8 No. 40	Alles um Liebe	Was ist es, das die Seele füllt?	27/7/1815	Text by Kosegarten
242	242	(1892)	XIX; No. 18	III, 4 No. 27	Trinklied im Winter, a.k.a. Winterlied, D 242	Das Glas gefüllt!	August; 1815?	Text by Hölty (other setting: D 242A); For ttb
	242A			IV, 8 No. 41	Winterabend, D 242A, a.k.a. Winterlied	Das Glas gefüllt!	1815?	Text by Hölty (other setting: D 242)
243	243	(1892)	XIX; No. 19	III, 4 No. 28	Frühlingslied, D 243	Die Luft ist blau	August; 1815?	Text by Hölty (other setting: D 398); For ttb
244	244	(1892)	XIX; No. 27	III, 4 No. 29; VIII, 2 No. 25	Willkommen, lieber schöner Mai	Willkommen, lieber schöner Mai	August; 1815?	Text by Hölty; Canon for three voices in two sections
245	587							See D 587
246	246	(1830)	XX, 3 No. 109	IV, 8 No. 42	Die Bürgschaft, D 246	Zu Dionys, dem Tyrannen	August; 1815	Text by Schiller; Partly reused in D 435
247	247	118p,6 (1829)	XX, 3 No. 119	IV, 8 No. 43	Die Spinnerin	Als ich still und ruhig spann	August; 1815	Text by Goethe
248	248	118p,4 (1829)	XX, 3 No. 135	IV, 8 No. 44	Lob des Tokayers	O köstlicher Tokayer, o königlicher Wein	August; 1815	Text by Baumberg
249	249			III, 2b Anh. No. 4a	Die Schlacht, D 249	Schwer und dumpfig	1/8/1815	Text by Schiller (other setting: D 387); Sketch
250	250	(1872)	XX, 3 No. 105	IV, 13	Das Geheimnis, D 250	Sie konnte mir kein Wörtchen sagen	7/8/1815	Text by Schiller (other setting: D 793)
251	251	(1872)	XX, 3 No. 106	IV, 4	Hoffnung, D 251	Es reden und träumen die Menschen viel	7/8/1815	Text by Schiller (other setting: D 637)
252	252	(1887)	XX, 3 No. 108	IV, 8 No. 46	Das Mädchen aus der Fremde, D 252	In einem Tal bei armen Hirten	12/8/1815	Text by Schiller (other setting: D 117)
253	253	(1887)	XX, 3 No. 110	III, 4 No. 30; IV, 8 No. 47	Punschlied: Im Norden zu singen	Auf der Berge freien Höhen	18/8/1815	Text by Schiller; Two versions: 2nd for two voices
254	254	(1887)	XX, 3 No. 111	IV, 8 No. 48	Der Gott und die Bajadere	Mahadöh, der Herr der Erde	18/8/1815	Text by Goethe
255	255	(1850)	XX, 3 No. 112	IV, 8 No. 49	Der Rattenfänger	Ich bin der wohlbekannte Sänger	19/8/1815	Text by Goethe
256	256	(1887)	XX, 3 No. 113	IV, 8 No. 50	Der Schatzgräber	Arm am Beutel, krank am Herzen	19/8/1815	Text by Goethe
257	257	3,3 (1821)	XX, 3 No. 114	IV, 1a	Heidenröslein	Sah ein Knab' ein Röslein stehn	19/8/1815	Text by Goethe
258	258	(1887)	XX, 3 No. 115	IV, 8 No. 51	Bundeslied	In allen guten Stunden	19/8/1815	Text by Goethe
259	259	(1850)	XX, 3 No. 116	IV, 9 No. 27	An den Mond, D 259	Füllest wieder Busch und Tal	19/8/1815	Text by Goethe (other setting: D 296)
260	260	115p,2 (1829)	XX, 3 No. 117	IV, 8 No. 52	Wonne der Wehmut	Trocknet nicht, trocknet nicht	20/8/1815	Text by Goethe; Reused in D
261	261	(1850)	XX, 3 No. 118	IV, 8 No. 53	Wer kauft Liebesgötter?	Von allen schönen Waren	21/8/1815	Text by Goethe, from Der Zauberflöte zweiter Teil
262	262	(1895)	XX, 3 No. 134	IV, 9 No. 1	Die Fröhlichkeit	Wess' Adern leichtes Blut durchspringt	22/8/1815	Text by Prandstätter
263	263	(1848)	XX, 3 No. 123	IV, 9 No. 2	Cora an die Sonne	Nach so vielen trüben Tagen	22/8/1815	Text by Baumberg
264	264	(1850) (1872)	XX, 3 No. 124	IV, 9 No. 3	Der Morgenkuß	Durch eine ganze Nacht sich nah zu sein	22/8/1815	Text by Baumberg; Two versions: 2nd, publ. in 1850, in AGA
265	265	(1895)	XX, 3 No. 125	IV, 9 No. 4	Abendständchen: An Lina	Sei sanft wie ihre Seele	23/8/1815	Text by Baumberg
266	266	(1895)	XX, 3 No. 126	IV, 9 No. 5	Morgenlied, D 266	Willkommen, rotes Morgenlicht!	24/8/1815	Text by Stolberg-Stolberg
267	267	(1872)	XVI; No. 17	III, 3 No. 19	Trinklied, D 267	Auf! Jeder sei nun froh und sorgenfrei!	25/8/1815	For ttbb and piano
268	268	(1872)	XVI; No. 18	III, 3 No. 20	Bergknappenlied	Hinab, ihr Brüder, in den Schacht!	25/8/1815	For ttbb and piano
269	269	(1848)	XVIII; No. 5	III, 3 No. 5 Anh. IV No. 2	Das Leben	Das Leben ist ein Traum	25/8/1815	Text by Wannovius; Two versions: 1st for tbb and piano – 2nd, in AGA, for ssa and piano
270	270	118p,5 (1829)	XX, 3 No. 127	IV, 9 No. 6	An die Sonne, D 270	Sinke, liebe Sonne	25/8/1815	Text by Baumberg
271	271	(1895)	XX, 3 No. 128	IV, 9 No. 7	Der Weiberfreund	Noch fand von Evens Töchterscharen ich keine	25/8/1815	Text by Ratschky, after Cowley
272	272	(1872)	XX, 3 No. 129	IV, 9 No. 8	An die Sonne, D 272	Königliche Morgensonne	25/8/1815	Text by Tiedge
273	273	(1895)	XX, 3 No. 130	IV, 9 No. 9	Lilla an die Morgenröte	Wie schön bist du, du güldne Morgenröte	25/8/1815	
274	274	(1850)	XX, 3 No. 131	IV, 9 No. 10	Tischlerlied	Mein Handwerk geht durch alle Welt	25/8/1815	
275	275	(1895)	XX, 3 No. 132	IV, 9 No. 11	Totenkranz für ein Kind	Sanft wehn, im Hauch der Abendluft	25/8/1815	Text by Matthisson
276	276	(1895)	XX, 3 No. 133	IV, 9 No. 12	Abendlied, D 276	Groß und rotenflammet	28/8/1815	Text by Stolberg-Stolberg
277	277	(1892)	XIX; No. 7	III, 3 No. 6	Punschlied, D 277	Vier Elemente, inning gesellt	29/8/1815	Text by Schiller; For ttb and piano
	277A	(1925)		VII/2, 4	Minuet with Trio, D 277A	A minor (minuet) / F major (trio)	September; 1815?	For piano; Partly reused in D 279
278	278	(1830) (1897)	XX, 3 No. 147; XXII, 11; No. 147	IV, 9 No. 13 Anh. No. 1	Ossians Lied nach dem Falle Nathos	Beugt euch aus euren Wolken nieder	1815	Text by Macpherson (Ossian), from Dar-Thula, transl. by E. Baron de Harold; Two versions: 1st is a fragment – 2nd publ. in 1830
279	279	(1888)	X No. 2	VII/2, 1 No. 2	Piano Sonata, D 279	C major	September; 1815	Allegro moderato – Andante – Minuet (partly based on D 277A); D 309A, or 346, may be 4th movement
280	280	(1837)	XX, 3 No. 139	IV, 9 No. 14	Das Rosenband	Im Frühlingsgarten fand ich sie	September; 1815	Text by Klopstock
281	281	(1830)	XX, 3 No. 148	IV, 9 No. 15	Das Mädchen von Inistore	Mädchen Inistores, wein auf dem Felsen	September; 1815	Text by Macpherson (Ossian), from Fingal, Book I, transl. by E. Baron de Harold
282	282	(1830)	XX, 4 No. 188	IV, 9 No. 16	Cronnan	Ich sitz' bei der moosigten Quelle	5/9/1815	Text by Macpherson (Ossian), from Carric-thura, transl. by E. Baron de Harold
283	283	172p,5 (1865)	XX, 3 No. 136	IV, 11	An den Frühling, D 283	Willkommen, schöner Jüngling!	6/9/1815	Text by Schiller (other settings: D 338 and 587)
284	284	(1895)	XX, 3 No. 137	IV, 9 No. 17	Lied, D 284	Es ist so angenehm, so süß	6/9/1815	Text by Schiller(?)
285	285	(1885) (1895)	XX, 3 No. 138	IV, 9 No. 18 Anh. No. 2	Furcht der Geliebten, a.k.a. An Cidli	Cidli, du weinest	12/9/1815	Text by Klopstock, from Oden; Two versions: 2nd publ. in 1885
286	286	(1837) (1895)	XX, 3 No. 140	IV, 9 No. 19	Selma und Selmar	Weine du nicht	14/9/1815	Text by Klopstock; Two versions: 2nd publ. in 1837
287	287	(1895)	XX, 3 No. 141	IV, 9 No. 20	Vaterlandslied	Ich bin ein deutsches Mädchen	14/9/1815	Text by Klopstock, from Oden; Two versions
288	288	(1895)	XX, 3 No. 142	IV, 9 No. 21	An Sie	Zeit, Verkündigerin der besten Freuden	14/9/1815	Text by Klopstock, from Oden
289	289	(1895)	XX, 3 No. 143	IV, 9 No. 22	Die Sommernacht	Wenn der Schimmer von dem Monde	14/9/1815	Text by Klopstock; Two versions
290	290	(1837)	XX, 3 No. 144	IV, 9 No. 23	Die frühen Gräber	Willkommen, o silberner Mond	14/9/1815	Text by Klopstock, from Oden
291	291	(1831) (1895)	XX, 3 No. 145	IV, 9 No. 24	Dem Unendlichen	Wie erhebt sich das Herz	15/9/1815	Text by Klopstock; Three versions: 2nd publ. in 1831
292	371							See D 371
293	293	(1830)	XX, 3 No. 146	IV, 9 No. 25	Shilric und Vinvela	Mein Geliebter ist ein Sohn des Hügels	20/9/1815	Text by Macpherson (Ossian), from Carric-thura, transl. by E. Baron de Harold
294	294	(1892)	XVII; No. 4	III, 1	Namensfeier für Franz Michael Vierthaler, a.k.a. Gratulations-Kantate	Erhabner! Verehrter Freund der Jugend!	27/9/1815	For stbSTB and orchestra
295	295	(1872) (1895)	XX, 3 No. 175	IV, 9 No. 26	Hoffnung, D 295	Schaff, das Tagwerk meiner Hände	1815 or 1816?	Text by Goethe; Two versions: 1st publ. in 1872
296	296	(1868)	XX, 3 No. 176	IV, 9 No. 28	An den Mond, D 296	Füllest wieder Busch und Tal	1815 or 1816?	Text by Goethe (other setting: D 259)
297	297	(1850) (1895)	XX, 3 No. 171	IV, 9 No. 29 Anh. No. 3	Augenlied	Süße Augen, klare Bronnen!	spring 1817?	Text by Mayrhofer; Two versions: 2nd publ. in 1850
298	298	(1895)	XX, 3 No. 170	IV, 9 No. 30	Liane	Hast du Lianen nicht gesehen?	October; 1815	Text by Mayrhofer
299	299	(1897) (1912)	XXI, 3 No. 29	VII/2, 6	Twelve Écossaises, D 299	Various keys	3/10/1815	For piano; No. 1 similar to D 145 Écoss. No. 1; Nos. 9–12 publ. in 1912
300	300	(1842)	XX, 6 No. 398	IV, 9 No. 31	Der Jüngling an der Quelle	Leise, rieselnder Quell	1816 or 1817?	Text by Salis-Seewis
301	301	(1842)	XX, 3 No. 149	IV, 9 No. 32	Lambertine	O Liebe, die mein Herz erfüllet	12/10/1815	Text by Stoll
302	302	(1895)	XX, 3 No. 150	IV, 9 No. 33	Labetrank der Liebe	Wenn im Spiele leiser Töne	15/10/1815	Text by Stoll
303	303	(1887)	XX, 3 No. 151	IV, 9 No. 34	An die Geliebte	O, daß ich dir vom stillen Auge	15/10/1815	Text by Stoll; Music partly reused in D 497
304	304	(1895)	XX, 3 No. 152	IV, 9 No. 35	Wiegenlied, D 304	Schlumm're sanft! Noch an dem Mutterherzen	15/10/1815	Text by Körner
305	305	(1895)	XX, 3 No. 153	IV, 9 No. 36	Mein Gruß an den Mai	Sei mir gegrüßt, o Mai	15/10/1815	Text by Kumpf
306	306	(1895)	XX, 3 No. 154	IV, 9 No. 37	Skolie, D 306	Laßt im Morgenstrahl des Mai'n	15/10/1815	Text by Deinhardstein
307	307	(1895)	XX, 3 No. 155	IV, 9 No. 38	Die Sternenwelten	Oben drehen sich die großen unbekannten Welten dort	15/10/1815	Text by Fellinger, after Jarnik
308	308	(1895)	XX, 3 No. 156	IV, 9 No. 39	Die Macht der Liebe	Überall, wohin mein Auge blicket	15/10/1815	Text by Kalchberg
309	309	(1872)	XX, 3 No. 157	IV, 9 No. 40	Das gestörte Glück	Ich hab' ein heißes junges Blut	15/10/1815	Text by Körner
	309A			VII/2, 1 Anh. No. 2	Rondo, D 309A	C major	1815	For piano; Fragment; 4th movement of D 279?
310	310	(1895)	XX, 3 No. 158	IV, 3	Sehnsucht, D 310, a.k.a. Lied der Mignon	Nur wer die Sehnsucht kennt	18/10/1815	Text by Goethe, from Wilhelm Meister's Apprenticeship (other settings: D 359, 481, 656 and 877 Nos. 1 & 4); Two versions
311	311			IV, 9 Anh. No. 3	An den Mond, D 311		19/10/1815?	For voice and piano; Sketch without text
312	312	58,1 (1826) (1895)	XX, 3 No. 159	IV, 3	Hektors Abschied	Will sich Hektor ewig von mir wenden	19/10/1815	Text by Schiller; Two versions: 2nd is Op. 58 No. 1
313	313	(1895)	XX, 3 No. 160	IV, 9 No. 41	Die Sterne, D 313	Wie wohl ist mir im Dunkeln!	19/10/1815	Text by Kosegarten
314	314	(1887)	XX, 3 No. 161	IV, 9 No. 42	Nachtgesang, D 314	Tiefe Feier schauert um die Welt	19/10/1815	Text by Kosegarten
315	315	(1895)	XX, 3 No. 162	IV, 9 No. 43	An Rosa I	Warum bist du nicht hier	19/10/1815	Text by Kosegarten
316	316	(1895)	XX, 3 No. 163	IV, 9 No. 44	An Rosa II	Rosa, denkst du an mich?	19/10/1815	Text by Kosegarten; Two versions
317	317	(1895)	XX, 3 No. 164	IV, 9 No. 45	Idens Schwanenlied	Wie schaust du aus dem Nebelflor	19/10/1815	Text by Kosegarten; Two versions: 2nd in AGA
318	318	(1895)	XX, 3 No. 165	IV, 9 No. 46	Schwangesang	Endlich stehn die Pforten offen	19/10/1815	Text by Kosegarten
319	319	(1895)	XX, 3 No. 166	IV, 9 No. 47	Luisens Antwort	Wohl weinen Gottes Engel	19/10/1815	Text by Kosegarten
320	320	(1895)	XX, 3 No. 167	IV, 9 No. 48	Der Zufriedene	Zwar schuf das Glück hienieden	23/10/1815	Text by Reissig
321	321	(1832)	XX, 3 No. 168	IV, 9 No. 49	Mignon a.k.a. Mignons Gesang	Kennst du das Land	23/10/1815	Text by Goethe, from Wilhelm Meister's Apprenticeship III, 1
322	322	(1837)	XX, 3 No. 169	IV, 9 No. 50	Hermann und Thusnelda	Ha, dort kömmt er	27/10/1815	Text by Klopstock
323; 991	323	(1895)	XX, 3 No. 172	IV, 9 No. 51 Anh. Nos. 5–6	Klage der Ceres	Ist der holde Lenz erschienen?	9/11/1815– June 1816	Text by Schiller; Two versions: 2nd in AGA; A fragment of the last part was D 991
324	324	141p (1837)	XIII, 1 No. 3	I, 2	Mass No. 3	B♭ major Kyrie – Gloria – Credo – Sanctus & Benedictus – Agnus Dei	started 11/11/1815	Text: Mass ordinary (other settings: D 24E, 31, 45, 49, 56, 66, 105, 167, 452, 678, 755 and 950); For satbSATB and orchestra
	324A			IV, 8 No. 41	Winterlied, D 324A		1816?	
325	325	(1895)	XX, 3 No. 173	IV, 1b No. 9	Harfenspieler, D 325	Wer sich der Einsamkeit ergibt	13/11/1815	Text by Goethe, from Wilhelm Meister's Apprenticeship (other setting: D 478 No. 1)
326	326	(1888)	XV, 2 No. 4	II, 3	Die Freunde von Salamanka	(Singspiel in two acts)	18/11/1815– 31/12/1815	Text by Mayrhofer; Music for ssstttbbbbbbSATB and orchestra; Overture – Act I (Nos. 1–7) – Act II (Nos. 8–18, with music of No. 12 reappearing in D 803 and of No. 14 in D 796 No. 15)
327	327			IV, 10	Lorma, D 327	Lorma saß in der Halle von Aldo	28/11/1815	Text by Macpherson (Ossian), from The Battle of Lora, transl. by E. Baron de Harold (other setting: D 376); Fragment
328	328	1 (1821) (1895)	XX, 3 No. 178	IV, 1a & b No. 1	Erlkönig	Wer reitet so spät durch Nacht und Wind?	October; 1815?	Text by Goethe; Four versions: 2nd and 3rd switched in AGA – 4th is Op. 1
329	329	(1895)	XX, 10; No. 591	IV, 9 Anh. No. 7	Die drei Sänger	Der König saß beim frohen Mahle	23/12/1815	Text by Bobrik; Fragment
	329A			III, 2b Anh. No. 3 VIII, 2 No. 27	Das Grab, D 329A	Das Grab ist tief und stille	28/12/1815?	Text by Salis-Seewis (other settings: D 330, 377, 569 and 643A); Canon for SATB; Sketch
330	330	(1895)	XX, 3 No. 182	III, 3 No. 14; Anh. I No. 2	Das Grab, D 330	Das Grab ist tief und stille	28/12/1815	Text by Salis-Seewis (other settings: D 329A, 377, 569 and 643A); For choir and piano

== Sources ==
Multi-volume editions, websites and catalogues

- Alte Gesamt-Ausgabe (AGA) = Franz Schubert's Works: Schubert, Franz (1884–1897). Johannes Brahms; Ignaz Brüll; Anton Door; Julius Epstein; Johann Nepomuk Fuchs; Josef Gänsbacher; Joseph Hellmesberger Sr.; Eusebius Mandyczewski (eds.). Franz Schubert's Werke: Kritisch durchgesehene Gesammtausgabe (in German). Leipzig: Breitkopf & Härtel. Reprints of several volumes by Kalmus and Dover Publications; Franz Schubert's Werke (Series I–XIX and XXI), Series XX, Revisionsbericht: Scores at the International Music Score Library Project
- Deutsch catalogue (D) = Schubert Thematic Catalogue:
  - Deutsch, Otto Erich; et al. (Donald R. Wakeling) (1951). Schubert: Thematic Catalogue of all his Works in Chronological Order (1st ed.). London: Dent. 1995 reprint, with errata correction: Deutsch, Otto Erich; et al. (Donald R. Wakeling) (1995). The Schubert Thematic Catalogue (Dover ed.). Mineola, N.Y.: Dover Publications. ISBN 0486286851.
  - Deutsch, Otto Erich (1978). Walther Dürr; Arnold Feil; Christa Landon [in German]; Werner Aderhold (eds.). Franz Schubert: Thematisches Verzeichnis seiner Werke in chronologischer Folge. New Schubert Edition (in German). Kassel: Bärenreiter. ISBN 9783761805718. ISMN 9790006305148.
    - Series VIII (Supplement)
    - Volume 4
- Hoboken catalogue (Hob.): "Joseph Haydn (1732–1809): Werke sortiert nach Hob (Hoboken-Verzeichnis, 1957-78)" (in German). Kaiserslautern: Klassika.
- Köchel catalogue (K.): "Wolfgang Amadeus Mozart (1756–1791): Werke sortiert nach KV^{6} (Köchel-Verzeichnis, 6. Auflage, 1964)" (in German). Kaiserslautern: Klassika.
- Neue Schubert-Ausgabe (NSA) = New Schubert Edition:
  - NSA scores: Schubert, Franz (1968–2019). International Schubert Association (Tübingen) (ed.). Franz Schubert (1797–1828): New Edition of the Complete Works (in German). Kassel: Bärenreiter. [over 80 volumes in eight series] Individual volumes:
    - NSA II, 15: Schubert, Franz; Neumann, Johann Philipp (2008). Jahrmärker, Manuela; Aigner, Thomas (eds.). Sacontala. New Schubert Edition (in German). Kassel: Bärenreiter. ISMN 9790006497294.
      - Series II (Stage Works), Vol. 15
    - NSA VIII, 4: See above Deutsch (1978)
  - NSA website: "New Schubert Edition". Tübingen: International Schubert Association.
- Schubert Online: "www.schubert-online.at: Schubert music manuscripts, first and early editions online". Vienna: Austrian Academy of Sciences (ÖAW).
- The LiederNet Archive: Ezust, Emily; et al. (LiederNet contributors). "Composer: Franz Peter Schubert (1797 - 1828)". Ontario: LiederNet Corporation.

Other

- Badura-Skoda, Eva; Branscombe, Peter, eds. (2008). Schubert Studies: Problems of Style and Chronology. Cambridge University Press. ISBN 0521088720.
  - Walther Dürr "Schubert's Songs and Their Poetry" pp. 1–24
  - Rufus Hallmark "Schubert's 'Auf dem Strom'" pp. 25–46
  - Elaine Brody "Schubert and Sulzer Revisited" pp. 47–60
  - Marius Flothuis "Schubert Revises Schubert" pp. 61–84
  - Elizabeth Norman McKay "Schubert as Composer of Operas" pp. 85–104
  - Peter Branscombe "Schubert and the Melodrama" pp. 105–142
  - Christoph Wolff "Schubert's 'Der Tod und dad Mädchen'" pp. 143–172
  - Peter Gülke on String Quintet D 956 pp. 173–186
  - Paul Badura-Skoda on Schubert's 'Great' C major Symphony pp. 187–208
  - Robert Winter "Paper Studies and the Future of Schubert Research" pp. 209–276
  - Eva Badura-Skoda "The Chronology of Schubert's Piano Trios" pp. 277–296
  - Reinhard Van Hoorickx "The Chronology of Schubert's Fragments and Sketches" pp. 297–326
  - Arnold Feil "Rhythm in Schubert" pp. 327–346
  - Alexander Weinmann on Leopold Puschl and Schubert's sojourn in Zseliz pp. 347–356
- Elsholz, Gunter (1982). Vogel, Reimut (ed.). Franz Schubert: Sinfonie in E-Dur 1825. Stuttgart: Goldoni. ISBN 3922044050. OCLC 987719669.
- Hilmar, Ernst; Jestremski, Margret, eds. (2004). Schubert-Enzyklopädie (in German). Vol. 1. Introduction by Alfred Brendel. Tutzing: Hans Schneider. ISBN 3795211557.
- Keefe, Simon P., ed. (2006). Mozart Studies. Cambridge University Press. ISBN 0521851025.
- Kube, Michael (2009). "Franz Schuberts Deutsche Trauermesse (D 621) als Problem der Text- und Stilkritik". In Mitterauer, Gertraud; Müller, Ulrich; Springeth, Margarete; Vitzthum, Verena (eds.). Was ist Textkritik?: Zur Geschichte und Relevanz eines Zentralbegriffs der Editionswissenschaft (in German). Walter de Gruyter. pp. 129–140. ISBN 3484970782.
- Mozart, Wolfgang Amadeus; Haydn, Joseph; Haydn, Michael (2008). Kircher, Armin (ed.). Chorbuch Mozart • Haydn VII: Kanonsammlung [Choral Collection Mozart • Haydn, Vol. VII: Canon Collection] (in German, Latin, English, and Italian). Stuttgart: Carus-Verlag. OCLC 274222567.
- Newbould, Brian (1999). Schubert: The Music and the Man. University of California Press. ISBN 0520219570.
- Reed, John (1997). The Schubert Song Companion. Manchester University Press. ISBN 1901341003.
- Van Hoorickx, Reinhard (1971). "Franz Schubert (1797–1828) List of the Dances in Chronological Order". Revue belge de Musicologie / Belgisch Tijdschrift voor Muziekwetenschap. 25 (1). Belgian Musicological Society: 68–97. doi:10.2307/3686180. ISSN 0771-6788. JSTOR 3686180.
- Van Hoorickx, Reinhard (1974–1976). "Thematic Catalogue of Schubert's Works: New Additions, Corrections and Notes". Revue belge de Musicologie / Belgisch Tijdschrift voor Muziekwetenschap. 28–30. Belgian Musicological Society: 136–171. doi:10.2307/3686053. ISSN 0771-6788. JSTOR 3686053.
