= 1815 in music =

== Events ==
- March 24 - The Handel and Haydn Society is founded as an oratorio society in Boston by a group of Boston merchants and musicians
- Spanish classical guitarist Fernando Sor moves to London, England to try to garner some success there.
- Summer – Gioachino Rossini goes to Naples as musical and artistic director of the Teatro San Carlo. His first opera for this theatre, Elisabetta, regina d'Inghilterra, premieres here on October 4.
- December 25 – The Handel and Haydn Society, the oldest continuously performing arts organization in the United States, gives its first performance, at the King's Chapel in Boston.

== Classical music ==
- William Beale – "Come let us join the Roundelay"
- Ludwig van Beethoven
  - Cello Sonatas Nos. 4 and 5, Op. 102. Published in 1817.
  - 25 Scottish Songs, Op. 108
  - Meeresstille und glückliche Fahrt, Op. 112, for chorus and orchestra
  - Zur Namensfeier overture, Op. 115
  - Leonore Prohaska, WoO 96
  - Es ist vollbracht, WoO 97
  - Die laute Klage, WoO 135
  - Des Krieger's Abschied, WoO 143
  - Das Geheimnis, WoO 145
  - 12 Songs of Various Nationalities, WoO 157
  - Glück zum neuen Jahr, WoO 165
  - Kurz ist der Schmerz, und ewig ist die Freude, WoO 166
- Leonhard von Call – 3 Guitar Sonatas, Op. 22
- Matthew Camidge – 6 Concertos for Organ, Op. 13
- Bartolommeo Campagnoli – Capricci, Op. 22
- Luigi Cherubini – Symphony in D major
- Carl Czerny – Variations brillantes, Op. 14
- Friedrich Ernst Fesca – Psalm 103, Op. 26
- Johann Nepomuk Hummel – Violin (or Flute) Sonata, Op. 64
- Franz Krommer – Concerto No.2 for 2 Clarinets, Op. 91
- Joseph Mayseder – String Quartet No.5, Op. 9
- Giacomo Meyerbeer – Gli Amori di Teolinda (cantata)
- Federico Moretti – "El amor y la amistad"
- Anton Reicha
  - Wind Quintet, Op. 91 No.1
  - Concerto for Clarinet and Orchestra in G minor
- Ferdinand Ries
  - The Dream, Op. 49
  - Piano Trio, Op. 63
- Franz Schubert
  - Dozens and Dozens of Lieder, canons, and choruses, most notably:
    - Mailied, D. 129, 199 and D. 202
    - Rastlose Liebe, D.138
    - An den Mond, D.193
    - Adelwold und Emma, D.211
    - Alles um Liebe, D.241
    - Die Bürgschaft, D.246
    - Heidenröslein, D.257
    - Erlkönig, D. 328
    - 6 Lieder, Op. posth. 118 (D. 233, 234, 221, 248, 270, 247)
  - Totus in corde langueo, D.136
  - 20 Waltzes, D.146
  - 10 Variations in F major, D.156
  - Piano Sonata in E major, D. 157 (and excerpt Allegro in E major, D.154)
  - Mass No.2, D.167 and Mass No.3, D.324
  - String Quartet No.9, D.173
  - Stabat Mater, D.175
  - Adagio in G major, D.178
  - Minuet in A minor, D.277a
  - Piano Sonata No. 2, D.279
  - 12 Ecossaises, D.299
  - Minuet in A major, D.334
  - 12 Ländler, D.681
  - Liebe säuseln die Blätter, D.988
- Louis Spohr – String Quartet No.8, Op. 29 No.2
- Johann Wilhelm Wilms – Sonata for Piano Four Hands, Op. 41

== Opera ==
- Gioachino Rossini
  - Elisabetta, regina d'Inghilterra
  - Torvaldo e Dorliska
- Franz Schubert
  - Fernando, D.220
  - Claudine von Villa Bella, D.239
  - Die Freunde von Salamanka, D.326
  - Der Vierjahrige Posten

== Births ==
- January 22 – Ferdinand Praeger, composer, music teacher, pianist and writer (d. 1891)
- March 8 – Jean Delphin Alard, composer and musician (died 1888)
- March 11 – Anna Bochkoltz, German operatic soprano, voice teacher and composer (d. 1879)
- April 6 – Robert Volkmann, composer (d. 1883)
- April 12 – Henry Hugo Pierson, English composer (d. 1873)
- May 10 – Anders Ljungqvist, fiddler (d. 1896)
- June 6 – Giovanni Peruzzini, Italian opera librettist, poet, and translator of German literature (d. 1869)
- June 28 – Robert Franz, composer (d. 1892)
- July 30 – Herman Severin Løvenskiold, composer (d. 1870)
- August 16 – Madame Céleste, dancer (d. 1882)
- September 4 – Mihály Mosonyi, arranger and composer (died 1870)
- September 17 – Halfdan Kjerulf, Norwegian composer (died 1868)
- October 17 – Emanuel Geibel, lyricist and playwright (died 1884)
- November – Adelaide Kemble, opera singer (d. 1879)
- December 25 – Temistocle Solera, opera composer and librettist (d. 1878)

== Deaths ==
- February 19 – Leonhard von Call, Austrian composer (born 1767)
- March 4 – Frances Abington, singer and actress (born 1737)
- April 8 – Jakub Jan Ryba, composer (born 1765) (suicide)
- May 21 – Roman Hofstetter, composer (born 1742)
- May 25 – Domenico Puccini, composer (born 1772)
- June 22 – William Reeve, theatre composer (born 1757)
- September 29 – Frederick Charles Reinhold, bass singer and organist (born 1737)
- October 3 – Daniel Belknap, farmer, mechanic, militia captain, poet and singing teacher, one of the first American composers. (born 1771)
- November 15 – Kaspar Anton Karl van Beethoven, brother of Ludwig van Beethoven (born 1774)
- November 28 – Johann Peter Salomon, violinist, conductor, impresario and composer (born 1745)
- December 14 – Charles Luke Lennox, heir to banking company, pianist (born 1800) (murder)
- date unknown – Giovanni Bertati, librettist (born 1735)
