= G minor =

Minor key and scale based on the note G

- Relative key: B-flat major
- Parallel key: G major
- Dominant key: D minor
- Subdominant key: C minor

Component pitches
- G, A, B♭, C, D, E♭, F

G minor is a minor scale based on G, consisting of the pitches G, A, B♭, C, D, E♭, and F. Its key signature has two flats. Its relative major is B-flat major and its parallel major is G major.

The G natural minor scale is:

Changes needed for the melodic and harmonic versions of the scale are written in with accidentals as necessary. The G harmonic minor and melodic minor scales are:

== Scale degree chords ==
The scale degree chords of G minor are:

- Tonic – G minor
- Supertonic – A diminished
- Mediant – B-flat major
- Subdominant – C minor
- Dominant – D minor
- Submediant – E-flat major
- Subtonic – F major

== Mozart's use of G minor ==
G minor has been considered the key through which Wolfgang Amadeus Mozart best expressed sadness and tragedy, and many of his minor key works are in G minor, such as Piano Quartet No. 1 and String Quintet No. 4. Though Mozart touched on various minor keys in his symphonies, G minor is the only minor key he used as a main key for his numbered symphonies (No. 25, and the famous No. 40). In the Classical period, symphonies in G minor almost always used four horns, two in G and two in B♭ alto. Another convention of G minor symphonies observed in Mozart's No. 25 and Mozart's No. 40 was the choice of E-flat major, the subdominant of the relative major B♭, for the slow movement, with other examples including Joseph Haydn's No. 39 and Johann Baptist Wanhal's G minor symphony from before 1771.

== Notable works in G minor ==
- Arcangelo Corelli
  - Christmas Concerto
- Henry Purcell
  - "Dido's Lament" from Dido and Aeneas
- Antonio Vivaldi
  - Violin Concerto, Op. 4/6, RV 316a
  - Violin Concerto, Op. 6/1, RV 324
  - Violin Concerto, Op. 6/3, RV 318
  - Violin Concerto, Op. 7/3, RV 326
  - Violin Concerto "Summer" from "The four seasons", Op. 8/2, RV 315
  - Violin Concerto, Op. 8/8, RV 332
  - Flute Concerto La Notte, Op. 10/2, RV 439
  - Oboe Concerto, Op. 11/6, RV 460
- Georg Philipp Telemann
  - Fantasia for flute solo No. 12
  - Fantasia for viola da gamba solo No. 7
- Johann Sebastian Bach
  - Violin Sonata No. 1, BWV 1001
  - Great Fantasia and Fugue, BWV 542
  - "Little" Fugue in G minor, BWV 578
  - English Suite No. 3, BWV 808
- Joseph Haydn
  - Stabat Mater
  - Symphony No. 39
  - Symphony No. 83 "The Hen"
  - String Quartet No. 26, Op. 20, No. 3
- Wolfgang Amadeus Mozart
  - Symphony No. 25
  - Symphony No. 40
  - String Quintet No. 4
  - Piano Quartet No. 1
  - Six Variations on "Hélas, j'ai perdu mon amant"
- Ludwig van Beethoven
  - Cello Sonata No. 2, Op. 5, No. 2
  - Piano Sonata No. 19, Op. 49/1
- Franz Schubert
  - Stabat Mater, D 175
  - String Quartet No. 9, D 173
  - Violin Sonata No. 3, Op. posth. 137/3, D 408
- Carl Maria von Weber
  - Trio for Piano, Flute and Cello, Op. 63
- Felix Mendelssohn
  - Piano Concerto No. 1, Op. 25
  - String Symphony No. 12
- Frédéric Chopin
  - Piano Trio, Op. 8
  - Ballade No. 1, Op. 23
  - Nocturne, Op. 37, No. 1
  - Prelude "Impatience", Op. 28, No. 22
  - Cello Sonata, Op. 65
  - Polonaise in G minor, Op. posth.
- Charles-Valentin Alkan
  - Scherzo diabolico, Op. 39, No. 3
  - Esquisses, Op. 63, No. 6 "Les cloches"; No. 26 "Petit air, Genre ancien"
- Franz Liszt
  - Transcendental Étude No. 6 "Vision"
- Robert Schumann
  - Symphony in G minor ("Zwickau")
  - Piano Sonata No. 2, Op. 22
  - Piano Trio No. 3, Op. 110
- Clara Schumann
  - Piano Trio, Op. 17
- Bedřich Smetana
  - Piano Trio, Op. 15
- Johannes Brahms
  - Piano Quartet No. 1, Op. 25
  - Rhapsody, Op. 79/2
  - Capriccio, Op. 116/3
  - Ballade, Op. 118/3
  - Hungarian Dance No. 5 (orchestral version)
- Camille Saint-Saëns
  - Piano Concerto No. 2, Op. 22
  - Danse macabre, Op. 40
- Max Bruch
  - Violin Concerto No. 1, Op. 26
- Pyotr Ilyich Tchaikovsky
  - Symphony No. 1, Op. 13
- Antonín Dvořák
  - Piano Concerto, Op. 33
  - Slavonic Dance No. 8
  - Rondo for Cello and Orchestra, Op. 94
  - Piano Trio No. 2, Op. 26
  - Bagatelles, Op. 47
- Edvard Grieg
  - Ballade in the Form of Variations on a Norwegian Folk Song, Op. 24
- Gabriel Fauré
  - Sicilienne, Op. 78
- Claude Debussy
  - String Quartet, Op. 10
- Isaac Albéniz
  - Cataluña, Op. 47, No. 2
- Mykola Leontovych
  - Shchedryk
- Gustav Holst
  - Mars, the bringer of war, from the orchestral suite The Planets
- Ralph Vaughan Williams
  - Mass in G minor
- Sergei Rachmaninoff
  - Piano Concerto No. 4
  - Prelude in G minor
  - Cello Sonata
- Sergei Prokofiev
  - Piano Concerto No. 2, Op. 16
- Dmitri Shostakovich
  - Symphony No. 11 The year 1905, Op. 103
  - Piano Quintet, Op. 57

== See also ==
- Key (music)
- Major and minor

No.	Flats		Sharps	
No.	Major	minor	Major	minor
0	C	a	C	a
1	F	d	G	e
2	B♭	g	D	b
3	E♭	c	A	f♯
4	A♭	f	E	c♯
5	D♭	b♭	B	g♯
6	G♭	e♭	F♯	d♯
7	C♭	a♭	C♯	a♯
8	F♭	d♭	G♯	e♯
