= Arminius (Bruch) =

1870s oratorio by Max Bruch

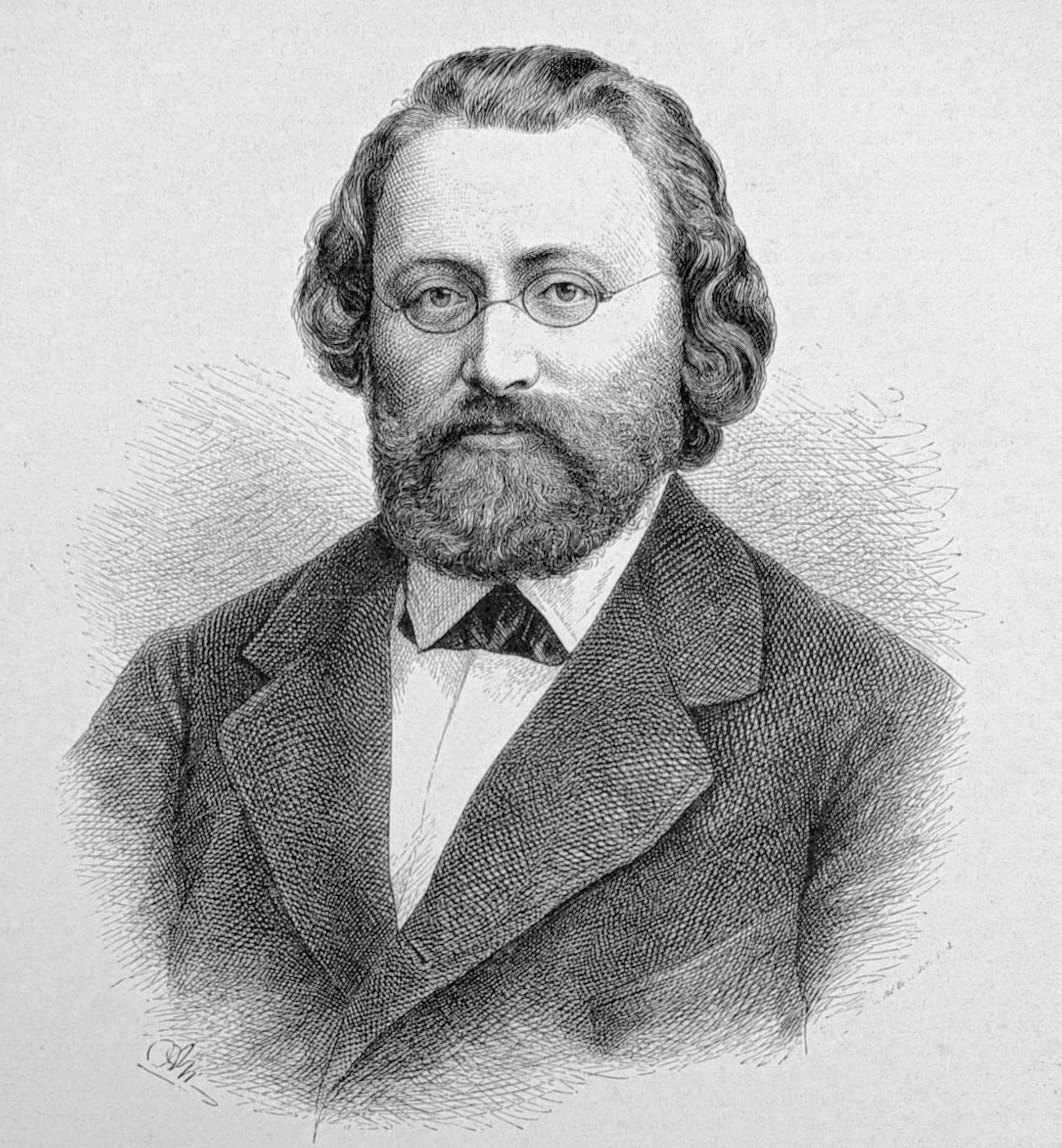
Max Bruch, 1881

Arminius (Op. 43) is an oratorio by the German composer Max Bruch. Bruch wrote the work between 1875 and 1877 during the consolidation of the newly founded German Empire. He picked the story revolving around Arminius and the Cherusci-led defeat of three Roman legions in the Teutoburg Forest in 9 A.D., which served as a German national myth from the 16th to the early 20th century.

== History ==
Since the rediscovery of Tacitus's Germania in the 16th century, Germans have exalted the Germanic tribes as their direct ancestors. They especially praised German liberty defended by Arminius in 9 A.D. when three legions of the Roman Empire were defeated on Germanic soil, thus putting an end to Roman plans to subjugate Germania.

This national myth inspired several poets and composers, amongst others Georg Friedrich Händel, Daniel Caspar von Lohenstein, Friedrich Gottlieb Klopstock and Heinrich von Kleist, to dedicate their works to Arminius and to the battle that preserved German liberty.

After the foundation of the German Empire in 1871, the interest in this story was renewed. The erection of the Hermannsdenkmal and the Hermann Heights Monument and the renaissance of general interest in Germanic culture (f.ex. in Richard Wagner's Ring tetralogy) took place during this era.

== Scoring and structure ==
Arminius is an oratorio in four parts for 3 soloists (alto, tenor, baritone), choir and orchestra.

1. Introduction
2. In the Sacred Grove
3. The Revolt
4. The Battle

Performed, the work approximately takes 90 minutes.

=== 1. Introduction ===
"Wir sind des Mars gewalt'ge Söhne, aus Götterkraft gezeugt sind wir! Vor unsern Waffen sanken der Erde stolze Reiche, wie Throngebilde brachen sie in Staub zusammen." —
"We are the sons of Mars the mighty, from Gods and heroes have we sprung! Before our arms unconquer'd the tribes of earth lie prostrate, they break asunder, like to moulds of clay, we crush them, they break asunder."

In the Introduction, the Roman legions approach the camp of Arminius and the Cheruski who express their will to not longer accept Roman tyranny: "But now your conqu'ring arms shall fail you, your star of glory here shall pale and die! We freeborn sons of Wodan, we have not learnt to bend to the stranger's yoke!" ("Doch hier ist ihrer Herrschaft Grenze, hier wird erbleichen ihres Ruhmes Stern! Wir, Wodans freie Söhne, wir beugten nie den Nacken dem fremden Joch!")

=== 2. In the Sacred Grove ===
"Ihr Götter, Walhallas Bewohner, o neiget euch gnädig uns! Erhöret, erhabene Mächte, des Volkes Fleh'n!" —
"Ye Gods, dwelling high in Valhalla, oh, graciously hear us call! Ye heed us, ye mighty immortals, your people pray!"

The second part of the oratorio introduces the listener to a sacred forest where the chorus and a priestess call the gods of heathen Germania to help them withstand.

=== 3. The Revolt ===
"O dass ich künden muss meines Volkes Schmach! Allvater, mächt'ger, zürnest du?" —
"Oh! Must I live to tell of my people's shame! Wodan, Allfather, art thou wroth?"

The insurrection actually begins. Arminius muses about the past when the Germanic tribes lived peacefully in their homes, posing no threat whatsoever to the mighty Roman Empire which nonetheless started to "pour[] upon our valleys", thus breaking the peace. Siegmund roams the area after having killed a Roman soldier who had insulted his wife. Deeply shattered by Siegmund's faith illustrating Roman tyranny, Arminius calls everyone to arms: "To arms! for just is our cause! Ranged in order, brothers all!" ("Zum Kampf! zum Kampf! zum heiligen Kampf schart euch, ihr tapfern Streiter all!").

=== 4. The Battle ===
"Groß ist der Ruhm der deutschen Söhne, groß die Ehre der gefallenen Helden!" —
"Germany's sons shall be renowned, great and glorious are the heroes who have fallen!"

The fierce battle is accompanied by renewed prayers to the Germanic gods who shall guide the warriors: "Freya, gracious mother, awful one, bounteous giver of blessings, look down on our warriors brave, oh protect them! Thousands are wounded, their blood is flowing, pour'd for their fatherland!" ("Hehre Mutter, Freya, göttliche, freudenspendende Mutter, o schirme der Jünglinge schöne Jugend! Sieh, wie sie bluten aus tausend Wunden, bluten fürs Vaterland!") Siegmund, fatally wounded, hears how "Allfather rides upon his steed of storm".

The oratorio ends with Arminius and the choir praising Wodan and singing paeans: "[W]e will chant a solemn song to Freedom, glorious treasure!" ("[Wir] singen der Freiheit hehres Lied, der goldenen und süßen Freiheit!")

== See also ==
- Hermann und Thusnelda
