= 1869 in music =

This article is about music-related events in 1869.

== Events ==
- February 28 – The premiere of Brahms' Rinaldo took place in Vienna at a concert of the Akademischer Gesangverein. The composer conducted, with the tenor Gustav Walter, a student chorus numbering 300, and the Court Opera orchestra.
- April 3 – Edvard Grieg's Piano Concerto is premiered at Copenhagen's Casino.
- May 25 – The Vienna State Opera is inaugurated with a performance of Mozart's Don Giovanni.
- September 22 – Richard Wagner's opera Das Rheingold debuts at the Königlich Hof- und Nationaltheater in Munich.
- Approximate date – Start of "golden age" of flamenco.
- Tchaikovsky completes the initial version of Romeo and Juliet. It will be revised the next year and in 1880.
- Richard Wagner resumes work on Siegfried after a twelve year break. Act 3 is begun in March.
- Also in 1869
- Ernesto Köhler leaves his native Italy at the age of twenty to acquire a position as an orchestral flautist in Vienna.

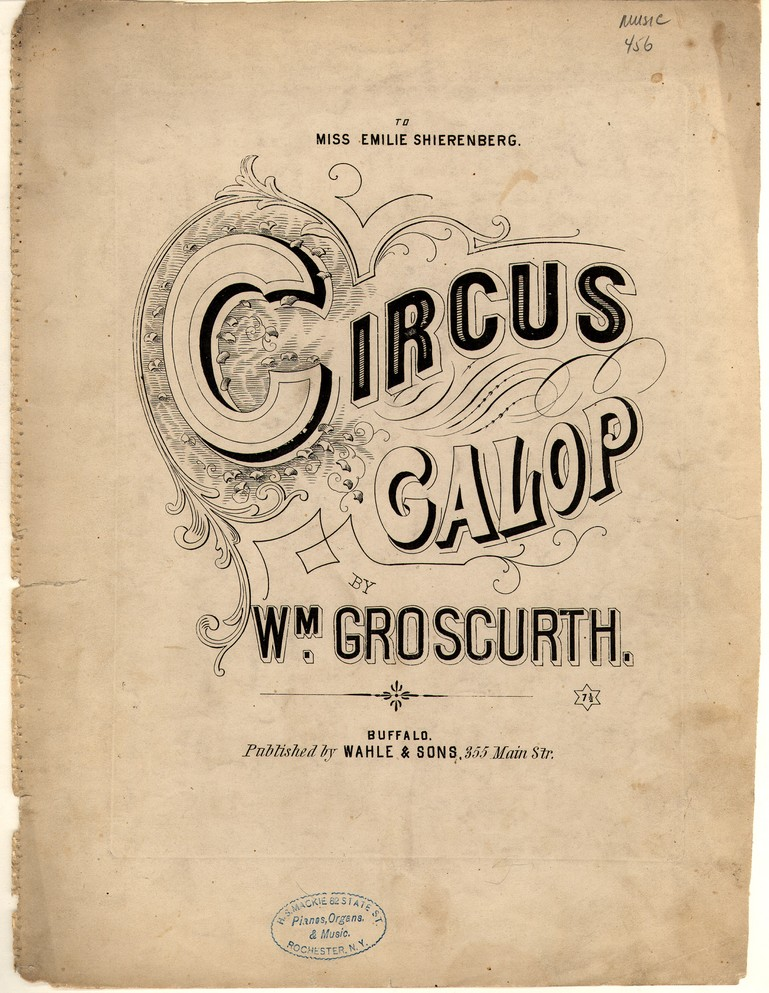
"Circus Galop" 1869 sheet music cover

== Published popular music ==
- "The Little Brown Jug" by J. Eastburn Winner
- "Now the Day is Over" w. Sabine Baring-Gould m. Joseph Barnby
- "Shoo Fly, Don't Bother Me" attributed to T. Brigham Bishop (possibly w. Billy Reeves m. Frank Campbell)
- "Sweet Genevieve" w. George Cooper m. Henry Tucker

== Classical music ==
- Mili Balakirev – Islamey an "Oriental Fantasy" for piano.
- Johannes Brahms
  - Ein deutsches Requiem
  - Hungarian Dances
- Anton Bruckner
  - Mitternacht, WAB 80
  - Symphony in D minor ("Die Nullte")
- Teresa Carreño – Un bal en rêve, Op.26
- Henri Duparc
  - Feuilles volantes, Op.1
  - Soupir
- Louis Moreau Gottschalk – Grande fantaisie triomphale sur l'hymne national brésilien, Op.69
- Louis James Alfred Lefébure-Wély – Vade-mecum de l'organiste, Op. 187
- Heinrich Lichner – Figurinen, Op.57
- Joachim Raff – Fantaisie, Op.142
- Camille Saint-Saëns
  - Orient et occident, Op. 25
  - La coccinelle
  - Paraphrase sur Mandolinata de Paladilhe
- George Stephanescu – Symphony in A
- Pyotr Ilyich Tchaikovsky – Six Romances, Op. 6 including None but the lonely heart

== Opera ==
- Frederic Clay – Ages Ago
- Karel Miry – Een engel op wacht (opera in 1 act, libretto by P. Geiregat, premiered on December 8 in Brussels)
- Richard Wagner – Das Rheingold

== Births ==
- January 20 – George Hamlin, American opera singer (d. 1923)
- February 1 – Kerry Mills, American violinist and songwriter (d. 1948)
- February 3 – Giulio Gatti-Casazza, opera manager (d. 1940)
- February 12 – Theodor Bertram, German opera singer (d.1907)
- March 3
  - Franz Wilczek, Austrian-American violinist (d.1916)
  - Henry Wood, conductor (d. 1944)
- March 23 – Frederick E. Hahn, American violinist, composer, and music educator (d. 1942)
- May 5 – Hans Pfitzner, composer (d. 1949)
- June 6 – Siegfried Wagner, composer (d. 1930)
- July 9 – Arnold Volpe, composer (d. 1940)
- July 13 – Florence Perry, opera singer (d. 1949)
- August 14 – Armas Järnefelt, Finnish composer and conductor (d. 1958)
- September 2 – Carlos Hartling, composer of the national anthem of Honduras (d. 1920)
- September 6 – Walford Davies, British composer and organist, Master of the King's Musick (d. 1941)
- September 21 – Henryk Melcer-Szczawiński, Polish composer, pianist, conductor, and teacher (d. 1928)
- September 30 – E. A. Couturier, American cornet virtuoso, composer, inventor and instrument manufacturer (d. 1950)
- October 8 (September 26 O.S.) – Komitas, born Soghomon Soghomonian, Turkish Armenian priest and ethnomusicologist (d. 1935)
- date unknown
  - Kate Carney, born Catherine Pattinson, English music hall singer (d. 1950)
  - Maximilian Maksakov, born Max Schwartz, Austro-Russian operatic baritone (d. 1936)

== Deaths ==
- January 10 – Joan Aulí, organist and composer (b. 1796)
- January 17 – Alexander Dargomyzhsky, Russian composer (b. 1813)
- January 30 – Charlotte Alington Barnard ('Claribel'), English ballad composer (b. 1830)
- March 8 – Hector Berlioz, composer (b. 1803)
- March 23 – Charles Lucas, cellist (b. 1808)
- April 1 – Alexander Dreyschock, pianist and composer (b. 1818)
- April 12 – Antonie Brentano, friend of Beethoven (b. 1780)
- April 15 – August Wilhelm Bach, German composer and organist (b. 1796)
- April 20 – Carl Loewe, composer, baritone, conductor (b. 1796)
- May 10 – Bernhard Molique, German violinist and composer (b. 1802)
- May 16 – Giovanni Peruzzini, Italian opera librettist, poet, and translator of German literature (b. 1815)
- June 4 – Joseph Ascher, pianist and composer (b. 1829)
- June 15 – Albert Grisar, composer (b. 1808)
- July 18 – Louis Bouilhet, lyricist (born 1822)
- August 13 – Giuseppe Persiani, opera composer (b. 1799)
- August 24 – Macedonio Alcalá, pianist, violinist and songwriter (b. 1831)
- November 29 – Giulia Grisi, opera singer (b. 1811)
- December 18 – Louis Moreau Gottschalk, composer and pianist (b. 1829) (overdose of quinine)
- December 23 – Julian Fontana, pianist (b. 1810)
- December 31 – Louis James Alfred Lefébure-Wély, organist (b. 1817)
