= Vaterlandslied =

Patriotic German poem

Vaterlandslied is the name of several patriotic German poems. The most famous one is "Ich bin ein deutsches Mädchen" written by Friedrich Gottlieb Klopstock in 1770 and dedicated to Johanna Elisabeth von Winthem.

== Historic background ==
Friedrich Gottlieb Klopstock already was a devout patriot as a youth, as is shown by a War Song written in 1749 honouring the Prussian king Frederick the Great. When the king, however, did not patronize German artists and poets but declared his love for French culture, Klopstock thought that it was up to him to defend German poetry.

Due to the political development during his lifetime, the disappointment with regard to the king's distaste of German culture, and the zeitgeist, his patriotism did not refer to Klopstock's present but to the past. The War Song consequently was rededicated to Henry the Fowler, and Arminius became a regular figure in Klopstock's œuvres. Among these works dedicated to the "liberator of Germany" are the poem "Hermann und Thusnelda" and the "Bardiete" (Klopstock's term for the genre of barditus or "battle song" after Tacitus' Germania) Hermann's Schlacht (1769), Hermann und die Prinzen (1784) and Hermann's Tod (1787).

The Vaterlandslied as a paean of German patriotism joins this list of literature exalting the nation. It was originally written for Johanna Elisabeth von Winthem, Klopstock's stepdaughter, who still was a child in 1770.

== Klopstock's lyrics ==
Ich bin ein deutsches Mädchen.
Mein Aug' ist blau, und sanft mein Blick;
Ich hab' ein Herz,
Das edel ist und stolz und gut.

Ich bin ein deutsches Mädchen.
Zorn blickt mein blaues Aug' auf den,
Es haßt mein Herz
Den, der sein Vaterland verkennt.

Ich bin ein deutsches Mädchen.
Erköre mir kein ander Land
Zum Vaterland,
Wär' mir auch frei die große Wahl.

Ich bin ein deutsches Mädchen.
Mein hohes Auge blickt auch Spott,
Blickt auf den,
Der Säumens macht bei dieser Wahl.

Du bist kein deutscher Jüngling,
Bist des lauen Säumens wert,
Des Vaterlands
Nicht wert, wenn du's nicht liebst, wie ich.

Du bist kein deutscher Jüngling.
Mein ganzes Herz verachtet dich,
Der's Vaterland
Verkennt, dich Fremdling! und dich Tor!

Ich bin ein deutsches Mädchen.
Mein gutes, edles, stolzes Herz
Schlägt laut empor
Beim süßen Namen Vaterland.

So schlägt mir's beim Namen
Des Jünglings nur, der, stolz wie ich
Auf's Vaterland,
Gut, edel ist, ein Deutscher ist.

I am a German girl!
My eyes are blue and soft my glance,
I have a heart
That is noble and proud and good.

I am a German girl!
My blue eyes look enraged upon him,
And my heart hates him,
Who misjudges his fatherland.

I am a German girl!
I would choose no other land
For fatherland,
Even if I were free to make that great choice.

I am a German girl!
My haughty eyes glance with scorn,
With scorn on him
Who hesitates at this choice.

You are no German youth!
You are worthy of lukewarm hesitation,
Not worthy of the fatherland,
If you do not love it as I do!

You are no German youth!
My whole heart despises you,
Who deny your fatherland,
You foreigner! and you fool!

I am a German girl!
My good, noble, proud heart
Surges upward
At the sweet name: Fatherland.

So it will beat someday, only at the name
Of a youth Who is as proud as I
Of the fatherland,
Who is good, noble, is a German.

== Music ==
As the poem became very popular, several composers set its lyrics to music. Among them are:

- Johann Friedrich Reichardt, 1773
- Carl Philipp Emanuel Bach, 1774
- Christian Gottlob Neefe, 1776 and 1785
- Christoph Willibald Gluck, 1786
- Franz Schubert, 1815, D 287

== Other Vaterlandslieder ==
Matthias Claudius replied to Klopstock′s poem and wrote ″Ich bin ein deutscher Jüngling″ (I am a German lad). Both Joseph Martin Kraus and Maria Theresia von Paradis provided a melody for the song.

August Silberstein wrote a poem of the same name for which Anton Bruckner composed the music: Vaterlandslied, WAB 92.

The most famous song of that name, besides Klopstock′s version, is, however, Ernst Moritz Arndt′s ″Der Gott, der Eisen wachsen ließ″ (The God who made iron grow), a patriotic anthem written during the Wars of Liberation against Napoleonic France. In the poem he incites his fellow countrymen to fight against the French invaders, and denounces those who actively or passively aid the occupiers and thus betray their country.

== See also ==
- Hermann und Thusnelda
