= Die Bürgschaft =

Poem by Friedrich Schiller

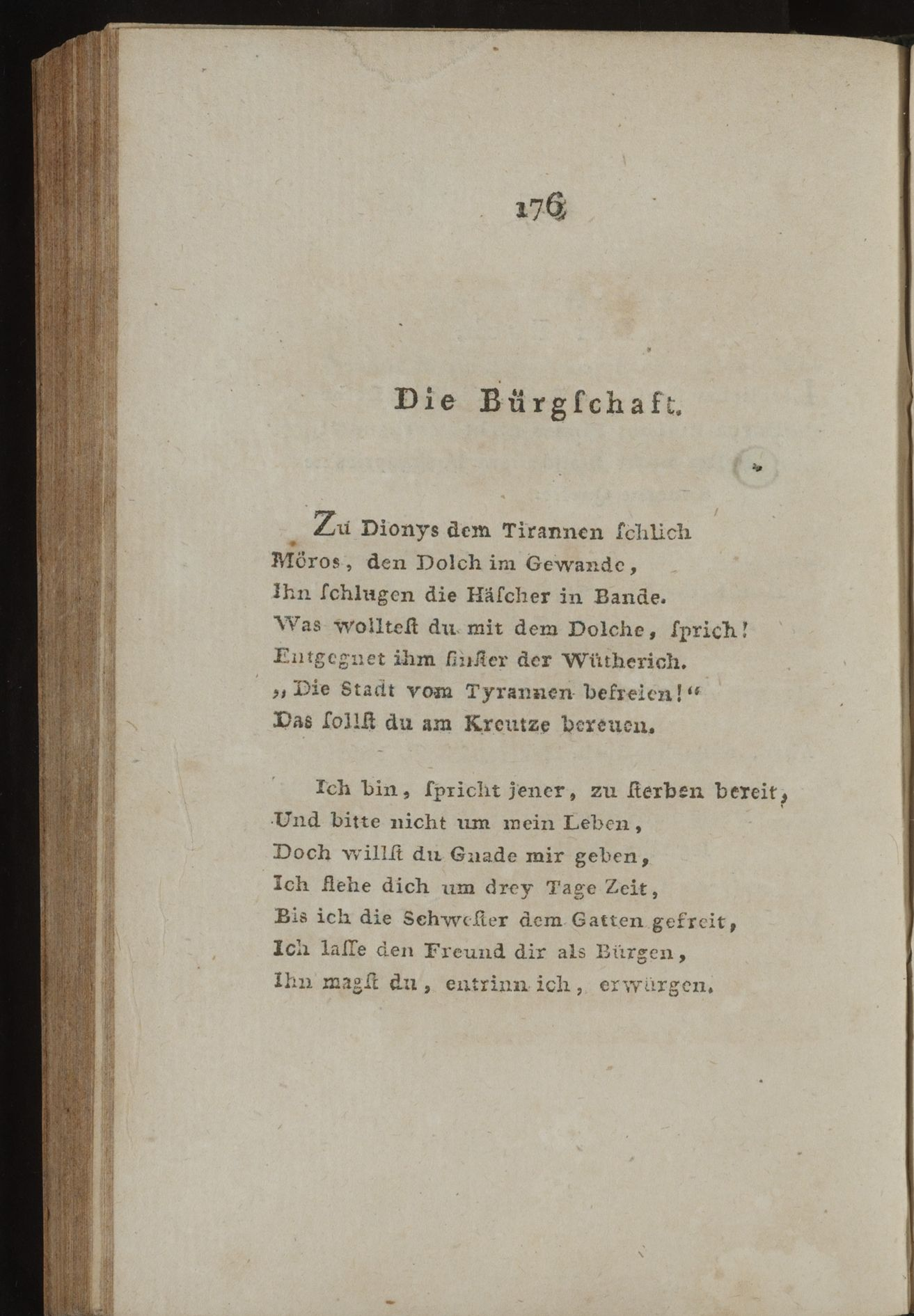
1799 Musen-Almanach, p. 176

"The Pledge" (German: "Die Bürgschaft", pronounced [diː ˈbʏʁkʃaft]) is a ballad published by the German poet Friedrich Schiller in his 1799 Musen-Almanach. He took the idea out of the ancient legend of Damon and Pythias issuing from the Latin Fabulae by Gaius Julius Hyginus, as rendered in the medieval collection of the Gesta Romanorum. It magnifies the belief in fidelity and loving friendship, and remains today one of the most famous German poems.

== Synopsis ==
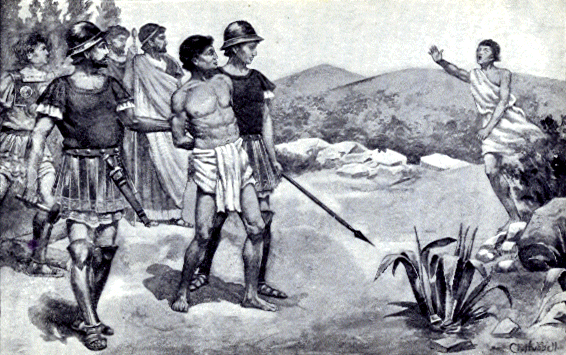
Damon and Pythias

The ballad is set in the ancient Greek polis of Syracuse. After a failed attempt by Damon to kill the gruesome tyrant Dionysius, he is caught and sentenced to death but asks for a delay to marry his sister to her designated husband. Dionysius allows him an extension of three days on condition that his friend remains with him to guarantee Damon's return. If he would not be back on time, his friend would suffer his punishment, while Damon would go with impunity.

To Dionysius' astonishment Damon, despite facing floods, an assault by a bandit gang, beating sun and lack of water on the way back to his own execution, at the last minute returns to save his friend. Ashamed by this deed, the tyrant admits the moral value of fidelity and asks to be considered as a friend in their midst.

== Versions ==
Schiller wrote the original version in summer 1798, simultaneously with his poem Der Kampf mit dem Drachen, and published both in 1799. In 1804 he re-worked the ballad and changed the name of the main character (from initially Moerus to Damon). It was translated into English by 1842 when it appeared in Blackwood's Edinburgh Magazine.

In the late 1930s, Bertolt Brecht wrote a verse commentary "Über Schillers Gedicht 'Die Bürgschaft'", a sonnet ironically praising the Golden Age in which contract had such moral force that the tyrant realizes that he is hardly needed. This has been set to music by Hanns Eisler.

In 1940 the Japanese author Osamu Dazai published the short story Run, Melos! reworking Schiller's poem. It is a widely read classic in Japanese schools.

== Musical settings ==
Franz Schubert set it to music twice: first as a song for voice and piano in 1815 (D 246), and then as an opera in 1816 (D 435) but left off work on the latter the middle of the third act.

There is also the setting for narrator and piano by Baltic German composer Gustav von Giźycki (1883).
