= Stabat Mater in G minor (Schubert) =

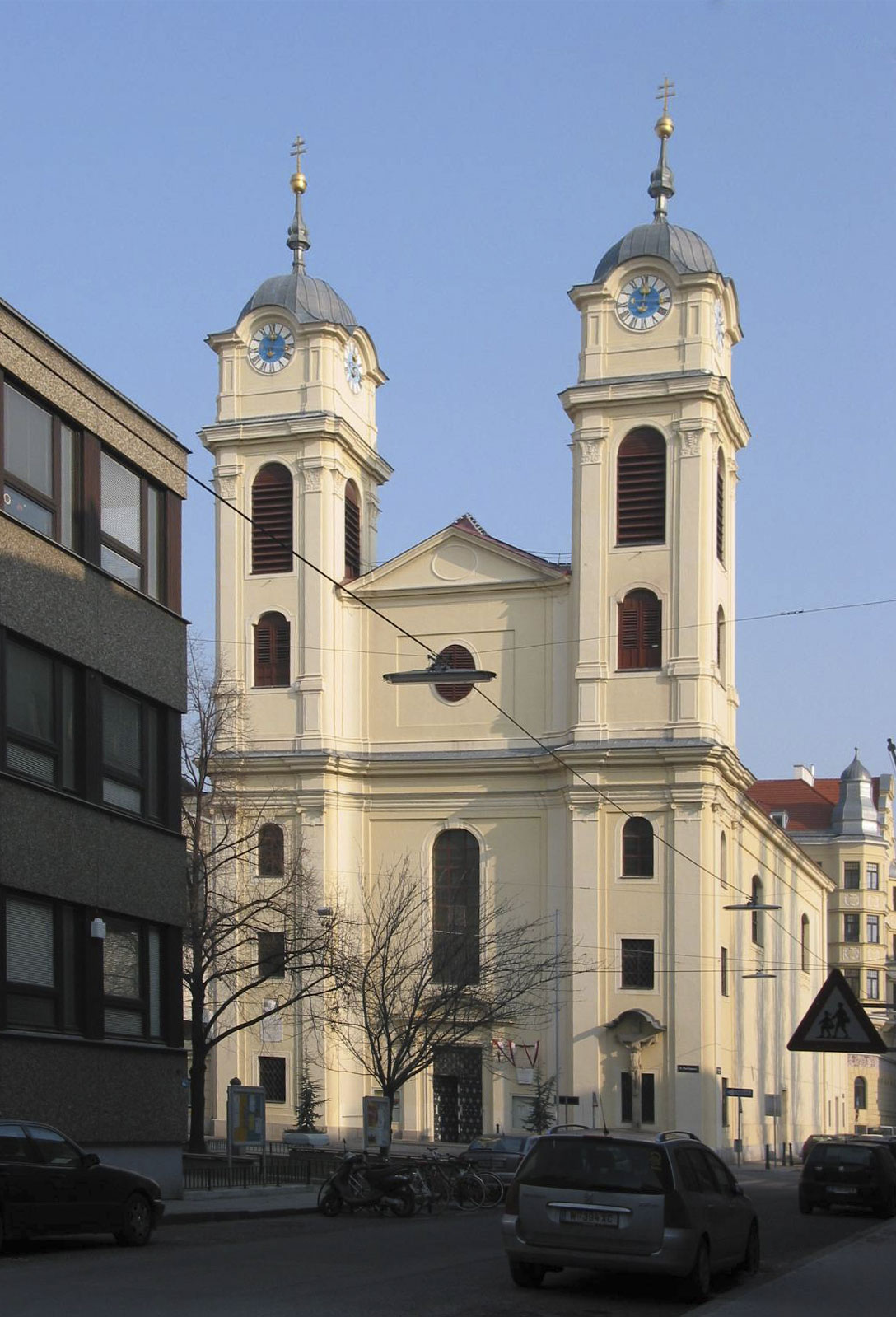
The parish church in Lichtental, also known as Schubertkirche. The Stabat Mater is thought to have been composed for liturgical use in the church.

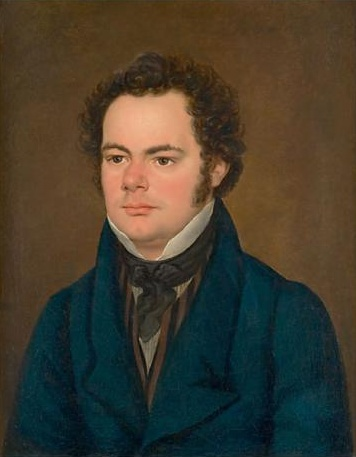
Portrait of Franz Schubert by Franz Eybl (1827)

Stabat Mater in G minor, D 175, is a musical setting of the Latin Stabat Mater sequence, composed by Franz Schubert in April 1815. It is scored for SATB choir, 2 oboes, 2 clarinets, 2 bassoons, 3 trombones, violin I and II, viola, and basso continuo (cello, double bass and organ).

This setting contains four stanzas of the twenty stanzas of the sequence. After a short orchestral interlude, these four stanzas are repeated with "far-reaching variation". Its structure as a single continuous movement is unusual; most of Schubert's sacred works (not including masses) were composed as one movement divided into three sections. While settings of the Stabat Mater developed into a staple of concert music by the late 19th century, it is thought that this piece would have been performed for liturgical use in the Lichtental Church.

Schubert's original manuscript indicates that he wished to score the piece with horns, rather than trombones. However, the early horn was valveless, limiting it from producing certain notes; the minor key setting made it impossible to perform the work with horns.

A year later, Schubert composed his Stabat Mater in F minor, D 383. This was a far longer work in the form of a short oratorio, and the text used was a German paraphrase of the Latin text, as written by F. G. Klopstock.
