= Symphony in G minor ("Zwickau") =

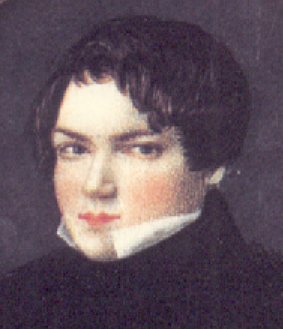
Robert Schumann in 1830

Symphony in G minor ("Zwickau"), WoO29 is an unfinished symphony by Robert Schumann, written between October 1832 and May 1833.

== Background ==
In the early 1830s Schumann worked on sketches for an opera based on Shakespeare's Hamlet. Although that project did not come to fruition, Schumann used the sketches and other fresh material to compose the first two movements of a symphony in G minor and sketches for two further movements before abandoning work on the symphony as well.

The nickname "Zwickau" comes from Schumann's home town where the first movement of the symphony was given a performance at the Gewandhaus on November 18, 1832, a concert at which Schumann's future wife, the then thirteen-year-old Clara Wieck, performed on piano and had one of her own orchestral compositions performed (the Scherzo for Orchestra - now lost). Later Schumann reworked the first movement and added the second one. The premiere of the earlier took place in Schneeberg on February 18, 1833, and then another performance of it happened in Leipzig Gewandhaus on April 29, 1833, at another Clara Wieck concert. However, the second movement was never performed during Robert Schumann's lifetime.

The composer from Leipzig Olav Kröger has completed the reconstruction of the third and fourth movements of the symphony. They were premiered at the 2013 edition of Schumann Festival in Zwickau in a period instrument performance of the whole work.

== Structure and style ==
The symphony is scored for a traditional orchestra of the period: 2 flutes, 2 oboes, 2 clarinets, 2 bassoons, 2 horns, 2 trumpets, 3 trombones, timpani and strings. The completed movements are as follows:

1. Moderato — Allegro molto
2. Andantino quasi allegretto — Intermezzo quasi Scherzo: Allegro assai — Andantino

A typical performance lasts approximately 18–19 minutes.

In the months leading up to working on this symphony Schumann had been studying and transcribing the music of Beethoven, whose influence can be heard in the first two movements, particularly the use of short motives rather than full-blown melodies in the first movement and the solemn rhythms of the second, which are reminiscent of the slow movement of Beethoven's Symphony No. 7.

== Selected discography ==
- CPO Records - Robert-Schumann-Philharmonie conducted by Frank Beermann (coupled with various orchestral preludes)
- Deutsche Grammophon Archiv Produktion - Orchestre Révolutionnaire et Romantique conducted by John Eliot Gardiner (complete recording of Schumann's symphonies)
- BIS Records - Swedish Chamber Orchestra conducted by Thomas Dausgaard
