= Der Kampf mit dem Drachen =

"The Battle with the Dragon" ("Der Kampf mit dem Drachen") is a 300-verse ballad by Friedrich Schiller, divided into 25 stanzas of 12 verses each.
