= Joseph Kenner =

German artist and politician (1794–1868)

Joseph Kenner (June 24, 1794 – January 20, 1868) was an Austrian public official, artist and district governor of Freistadt and Bad Ischl. He is known for his acquaintance with the composer Franz Schubert.

== Life and work ==
Kenner was born illegitimate in Vienna and raised by his mother (née Harl) in Linz with the musical von Spaun family. He attended the seminary of Kremsmünster Abbey from 1805 to 1811, where he met Franz von Schober and Franz von Schlechta. He then entered the Seminary of Vienna, where he met the composer Franz Schubert, who set several of his poems to music. His close friendship extended to others in Schubert's circle, including the painter Moritz von Schwind, who approved of Kenner's own paintings, including a cycle of martyr illustrations, Der Liedler.

Kenner shared his recollections of Schubert with Schubert's early biographer Ferdinand Luib in 1858. These were cited by Otto Erich Deutsch.

Kenner studied jurisprudence and political science and became an intern of the district and tax office in Linz in 1822 and promoted to magistrate in 1843. He served from 1850 to 1854 as district governor of Freistadt and from 1854 to 1857 of Ischl.

Kenner also collected coins for the Upper Austrian Museum Association (now the Landesmuseum). His sons Anton and Friedrich later found important positions in Austrian intellectual life and in the Austrian Academy of Sciences.
