= Der vierjährige Posten =

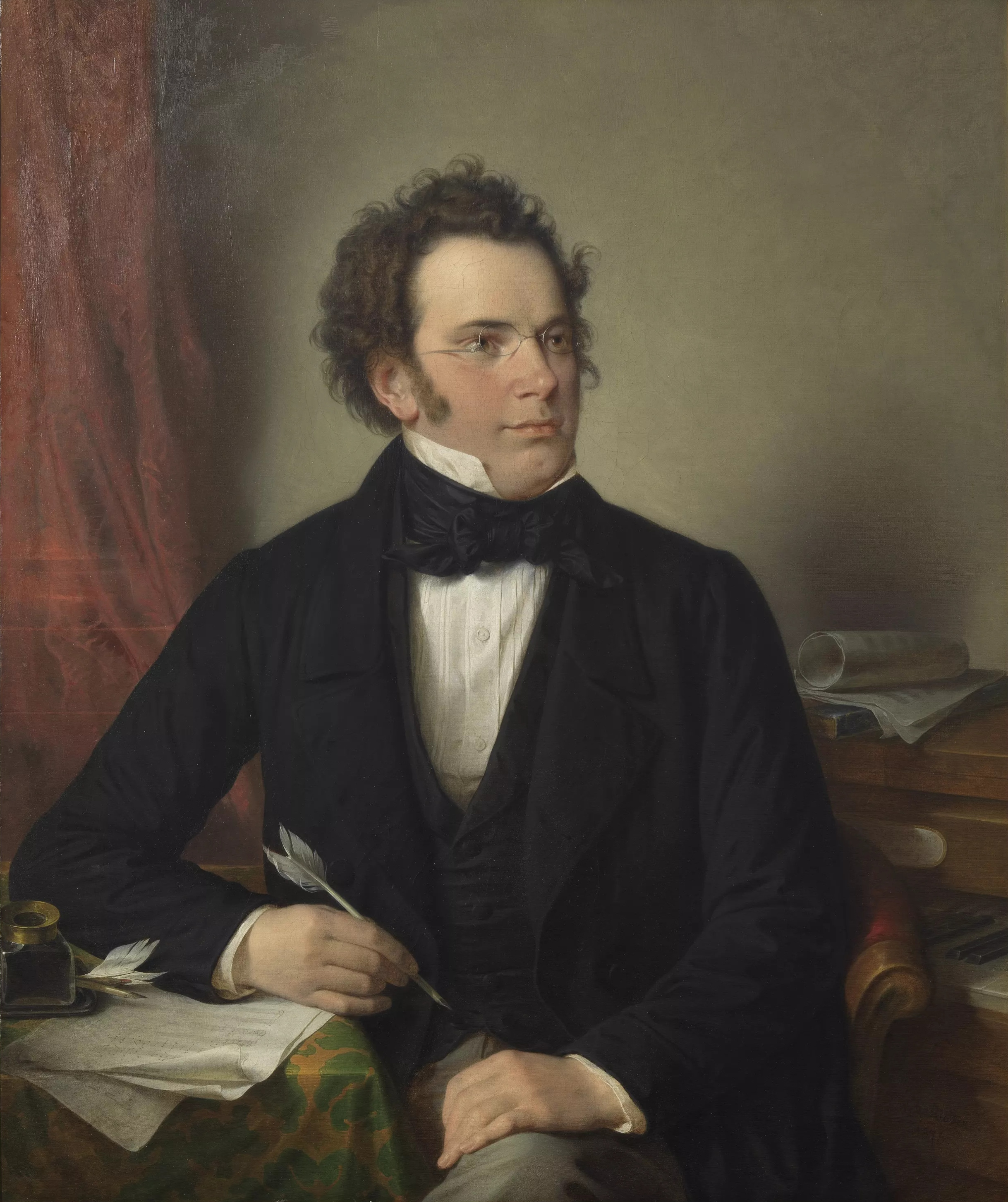
Franz Schubert

Der vierjährige Posten, D 190, is a one-act singspiel by Franz Schubert to a libretto by Theodor Körner written for Carl Steinacker's (1784–1814) opera of the same title that premiered in 1813 in Vienna's Theater an der Wien. Written in 1815 when Schubert was 18 years old, it was first performed on 23 September 1896, 67 years after Schubert's death, at the Dresden Court Opera.

The work consists of an overture and eight numbers for soprano, three tenors, bass, one spoken role, mixed choir and orchestra:

Ouvertüre

1. Introduktion: Heiter strahlt der neue Morgen
2. Duett: Du guter Heinrich! Ach, was wir beide doch glücklich sind!
3. Terzett: Mag dich die Hoffnung nicht betrügen!
4. Quartett: Freund, eilet euch zu retten!
5. Arie: Gott! Gott! höre meine Stimme (a version for voice and piano is also extant)
6. Marsch und Soldatenchor: Lustig in den Kampf
7. Ensemble: Um Gotteswillen, er ist verloren!
8. Finale: Schöne Stunde, die uns blendet

== Recordings ==
- Christoph Spering, Capriccio
