= Johann Mayrhofer =

Austrian poet and librettist (1787–1836)

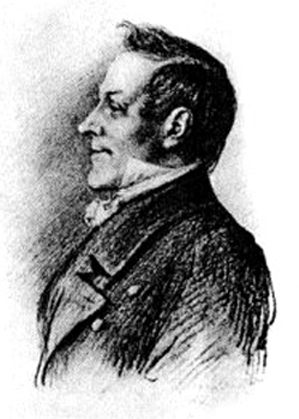
Schwind: Johann Mayrhofer

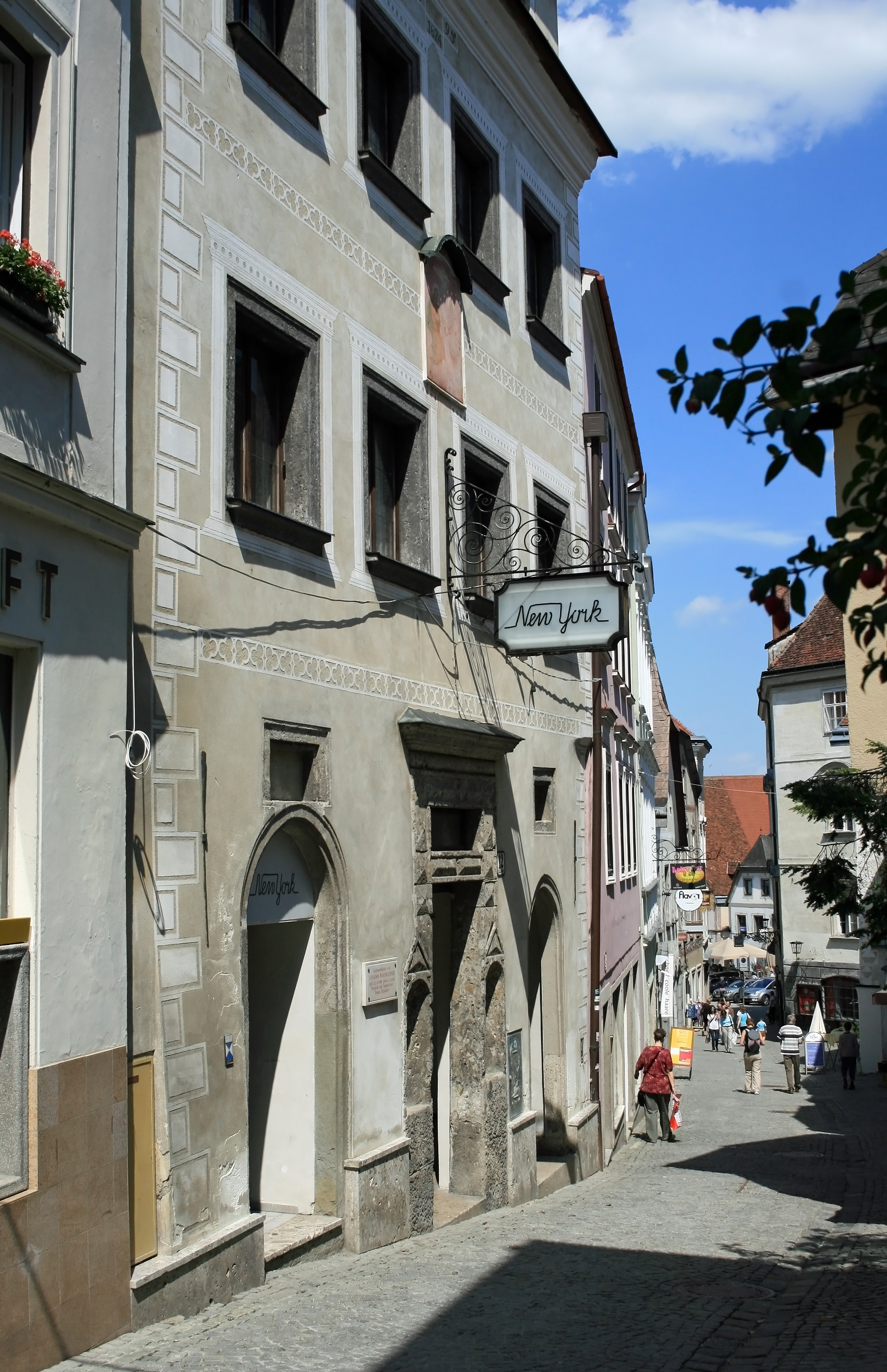
Birthplace Steyr, Pfarrgasse

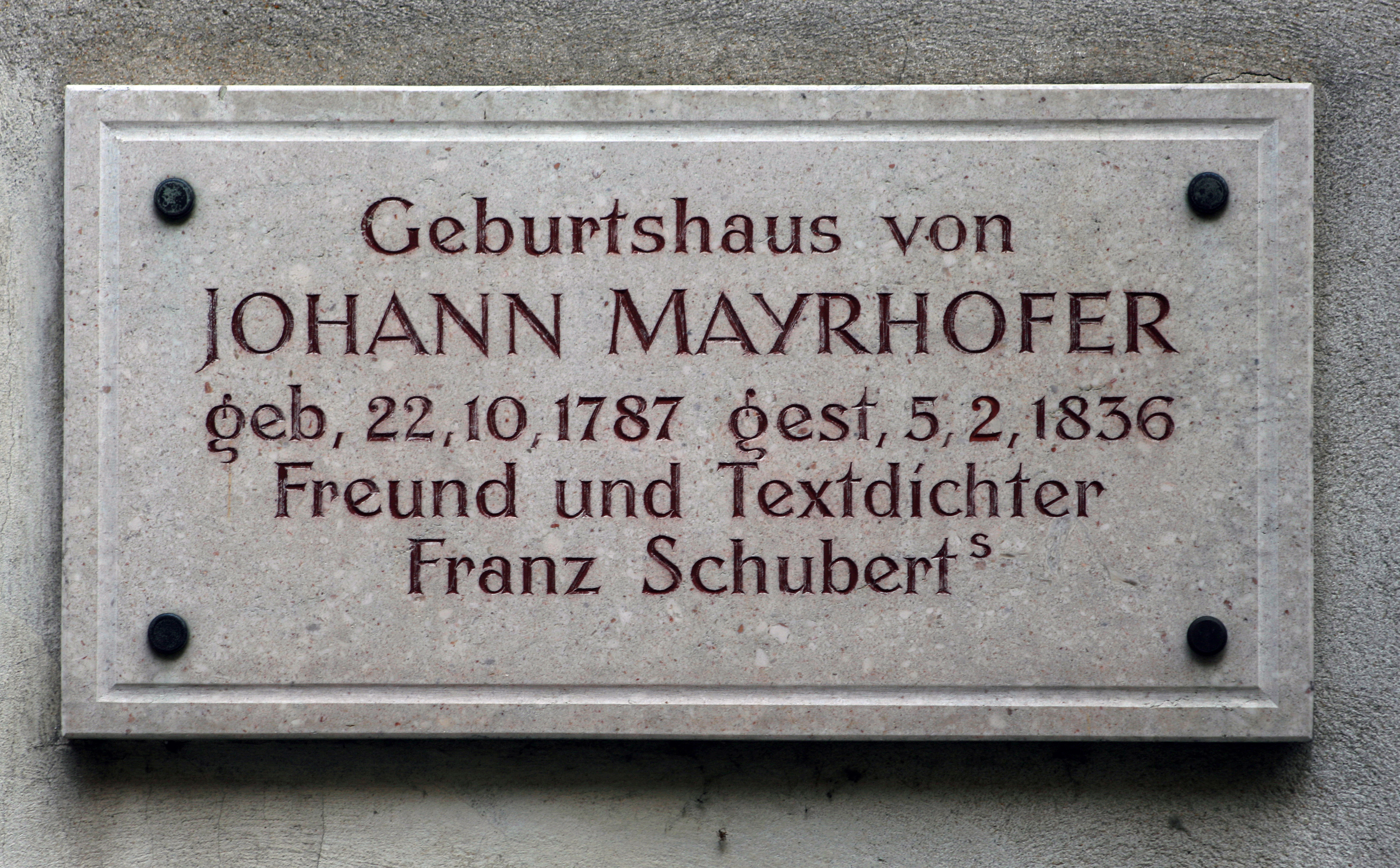
Memorial plaque, Steyr

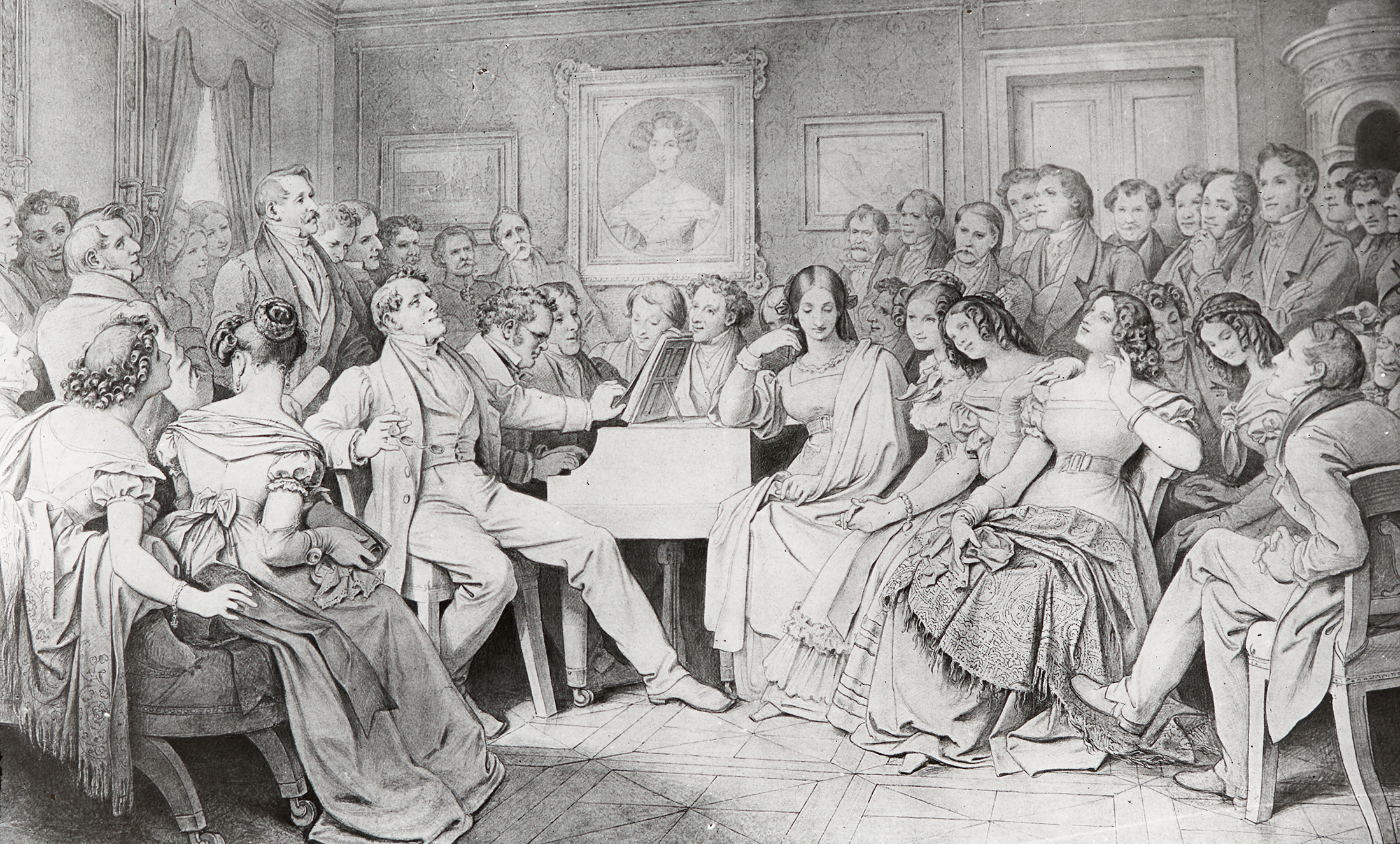
Schwind: Spaun's Schubertiade 1828, Vogl and Schubert, Mayrhofer (right)

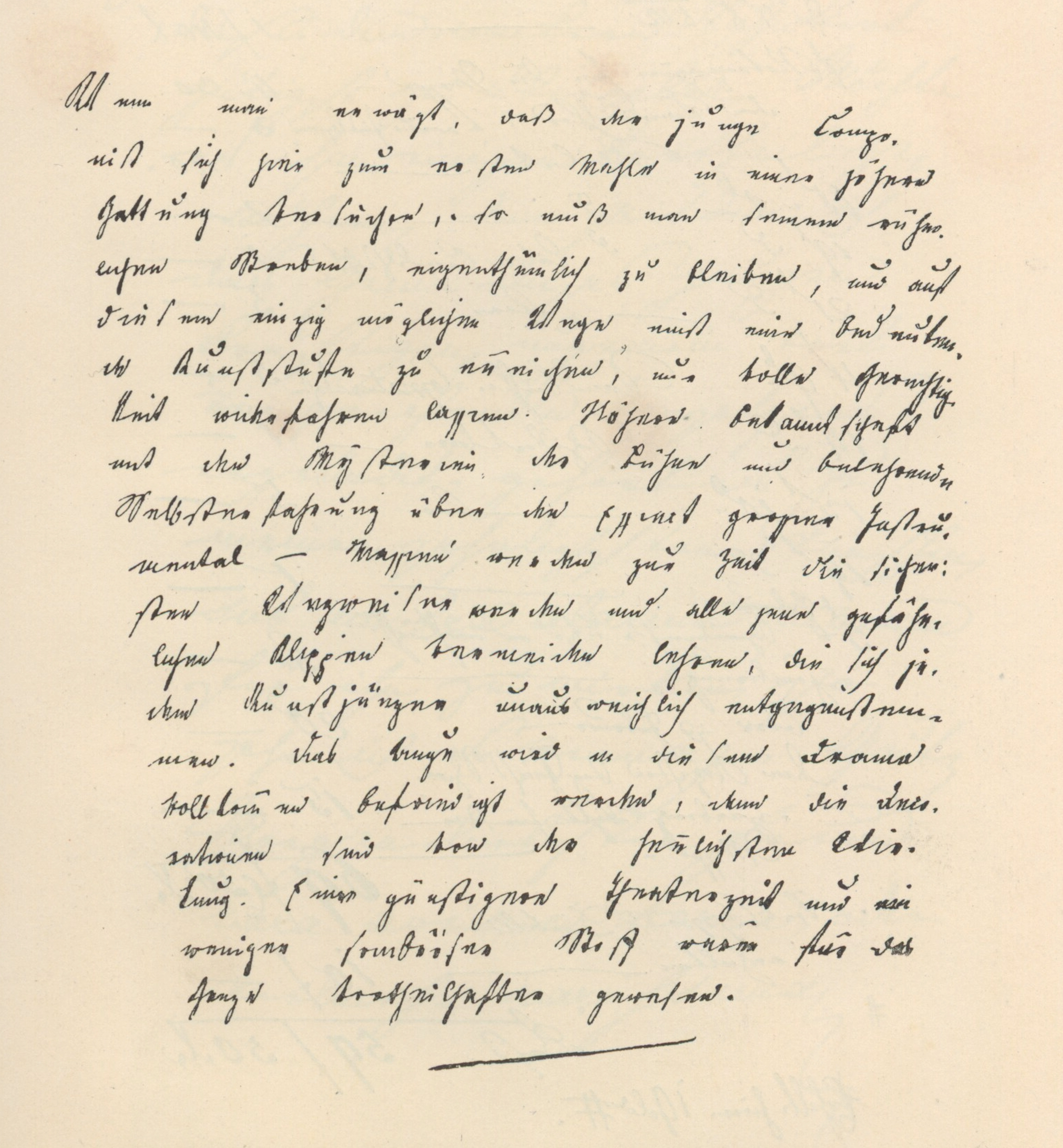
Johann Mayrhofer's handwriting 1820 (review of Schubert's Die Zauberharfe)

Johann Baptist Mayrhofer (22 October 1787 – 5 February 1836) was an Austrian poet and librettist. He is best known for his close friendship with the composer Franz Schubert.

== Biography ==
Mayrhofer was born in Steyr, Austria, educated at Novitiate in St. Florian's Priory, Upper Austria. In 1810 he began to study jurisprudence and theology at the University of Vienna, both of which courses he finished. He worked as a censor at the Zentral-Bücher-Revisions-Amt in Vienna.

In 1814 he met the young composer Franz Schubert and his friends (Joseph von Spaun, Franz von Schober).

From 1818 to 1821 he lived with Schubert in a one-room apartment in a house on Wipplingerstrasse 4.

After Schubert moved out, he wrote the poem "An Franz" for him:

You love me! Deeply I have felt it,
You faithful boy, tender and good;
So steel yourself, beautifully bound,
The noble, youthful courage!
However life presses on,
We hear the kindred sounds.

Most scholars agree that he was homosexual. Mayrhofer wrote much lyric poetry and published it in 1824. Forty-seven Schubert songs and two of his operas (Die Freunde von Salamanka and Adrast) are based on texts by Mayrhofer.

In 1829 he published his Memories of Franz Schubert in the journal Neues Archiv für Geschichte, through which some remarkable information about Schubert and his circle of friends have been handed down.

Mayrhofer was a hypochondriac all his life: in 1836, during a cholera epidemic, he committed suicide by jumping from the window of his office in Vienna.

== Libretti ==
- Die Freunde von Salamanca (1815)
- Adrast (1819)

== Works ==
- Edition 1824
- Ernst von Feuchtersleben’s Edition 1843
- Mayrhofer’s Schubert songs
