= String Quartet No. 9 (Schubert) =

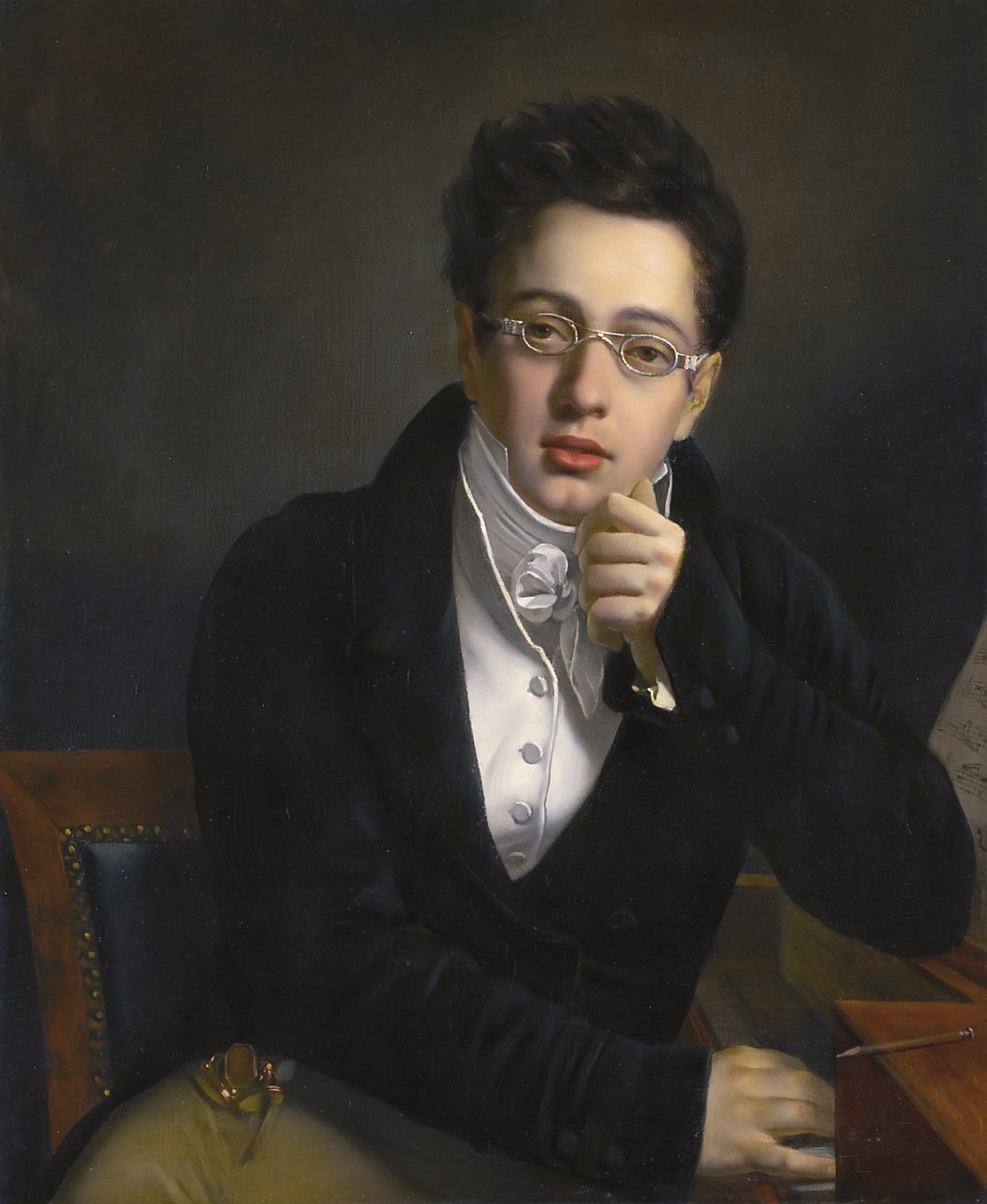
Possible portrait of the young Franz Schubert c. 1814, attributed to Josef Abel

The String Quartet No. 9 (D 173) in G minor was composed by Franz Schubert in 1815.

== Movements ==
The string quartet has four movements:

1. Allegro con brio (G minor)
2. Andantino (B♭ major)
3. Menuetto: Allegro vivace (G minor, with Trio in B♭ major)
4. Allegro (G minor)

== Sources ==
- Franz Schubert's Works, Series V: Streichquartette edited by Joseph Hellmesberger and Eusebius Mandyczewski. Breitkopf & Härtel, 1890.
- Otto Erich Deutsch (and others). Schubert Thematic Catalogue (several editions), No. 173.
- New Schubert Edition, Series VI, Volume 4: String Quartets II edited by Werner Aderhold, Bärenreiter, 1994.
