= Hermann und Thusnelda =

1752 poem by Friedrich Gottlieb Klopstock

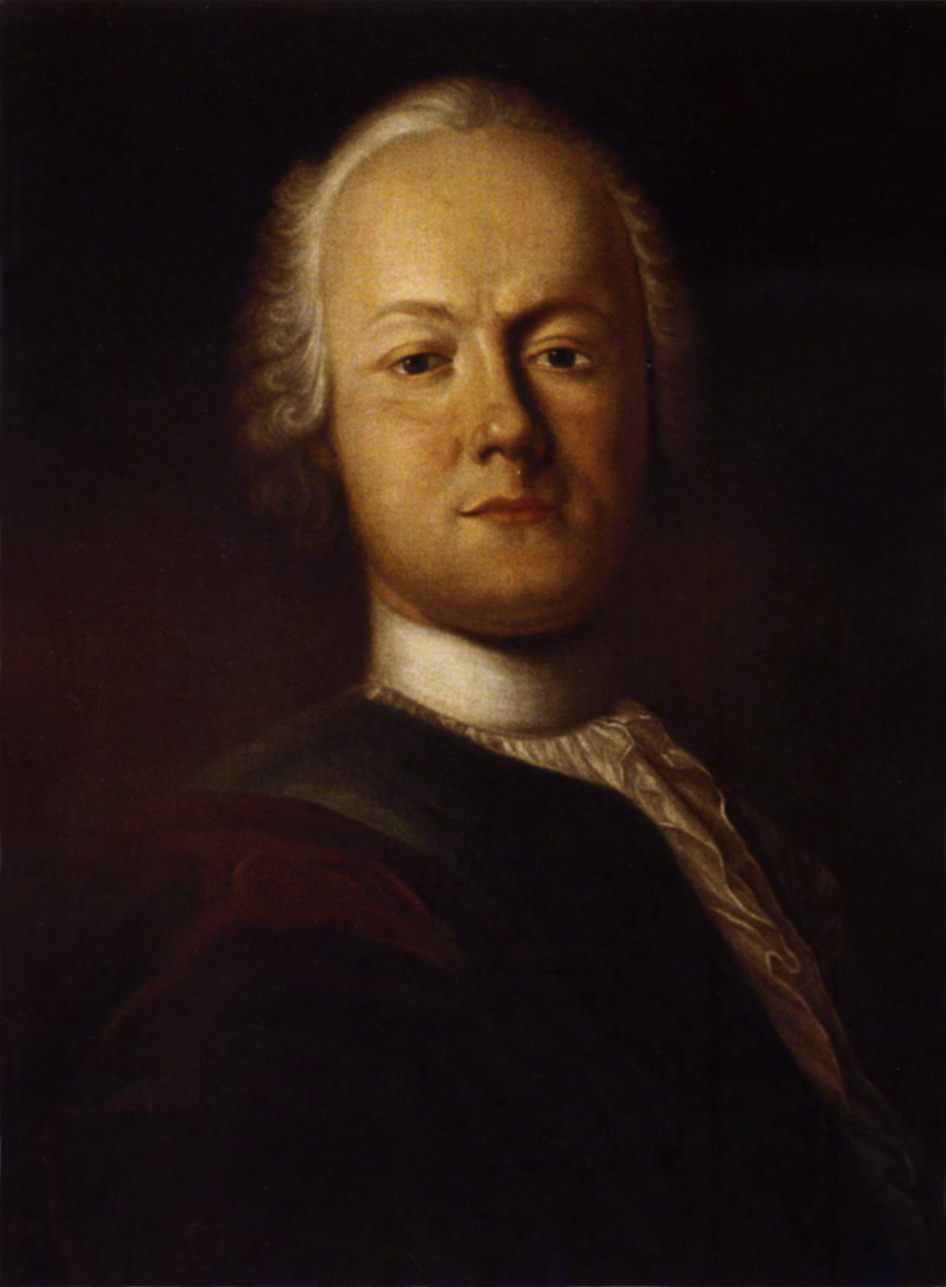
Friedrich Gottlieb Klopstock by Johann Caspar Füssli (1750)

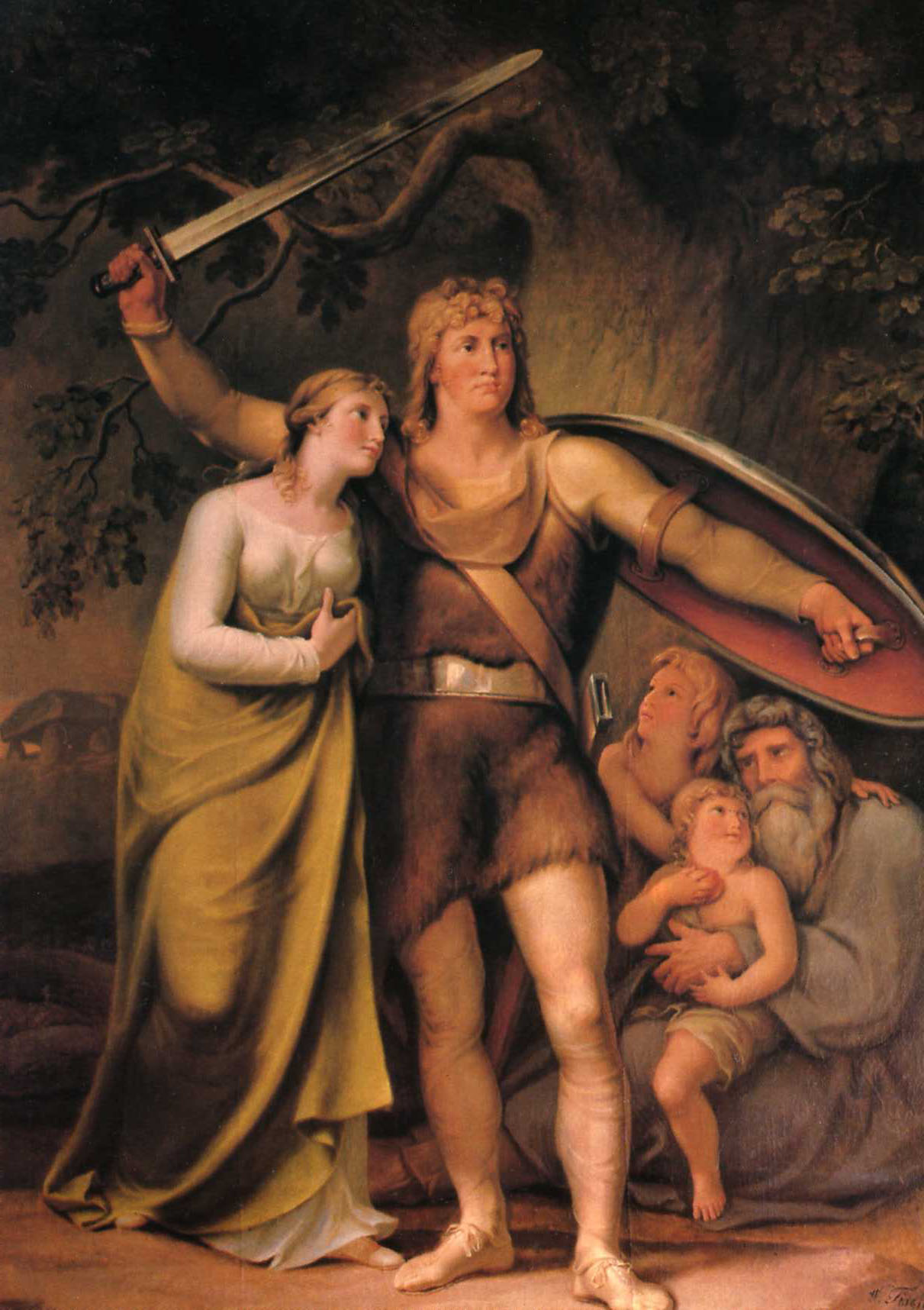
Hermann (Arminius) and Thusnelda by Johann Heinrich Wilhelm Tischbein (1822)

"Hermann und Thusnelda" is a poem written in 1752 by Friedrich Gottlieb Klopstock exalting the Cheruscan chieftain Arminius, whom Johannes Turmair and Martin Luther named Hermann in the 16th century, and his wife Thusnelda. The poem was set to music by Franz Schubert in 1815 (D 322).

== History ==
Since the rediscovery of Tacitus's Germania in the 16th century, Germans have exalted the Germanic tribes as their direct ancestors. They especially praised German liberty defended by Arminius in 9 A.D. when three legions of the Roman Empire were defeated on Germanic soil, thus putting an end to Roman plans to subjugate Germania.

In Klopstock's poem, blood-stained Hermann returns from battle and is praised by his wife Thusnelda, who is happy about the death of the Roman soldiers. Her husband's victory heavily delights her making her confess that her love for Hermann has never been as ardent as now after the lurid fight. Arminius himself only regrets that Roman emperor Augustus has not been present as he would have slain him.

Klopstock wrote several other dramas and poems about "Germany's liberator":

- Hermanns Schlacht. Ein Bardiet für die Schaubühne (1769);
- Hermann und die Fürsten. Ein Bardiet für die Schaubühne (1784);
- Hermanns Tod. Ein Bardiet für die Schaubühne (1787);
- "Wir und sie" (1798);
- "Hermann aus Walhalla" (1798).

In his later years, Christoph Willibald Gluck became interested in patriotic Germanic subjects and notably in Klopstock's work. Hence, he had planned to set the monumental work Hermanns Schlacht to music, but he died before he could realize it.

== Lyrics ==
Thusnelda:
Ha, dort kömmt er, mit Schweiß, mit Römerblut,
Mit dem Staube der Schlacht bedeckt! So schön war
Hermann niemals! So hat's ihm
Nie von dem Auge geflammt.

Komm, o komm, ich bebe vor Lust, reich' mir den Adler
Und das triefende Schwert! Komm, atm' und ruh'
Hier aus in meiner Umarmung
Von der zu schrecklichen Schlacht.

Ruh' hier, dass ich den Schweiß von der Stirn' abtrockne
Und der Wange das Blut! Wie glüht die Wange!
Hermann, Hermann, so hat dich
Niemals Thusnelda geliebt!

Selbst nicht, als du zuerst im Eichenschatten
Mit dem bräunlichen Arm mich wilder umfasstest!
Fliehend blieb ich und sah dir
Schon die Unsterblichkeit an,

Die nun dein ist! Erzählt's in allen Hainen,
Dass Augustus nun bang' mit seinen Göttern
Nektar trinket! Erzählt es in allen Hainen,
Dass Hermann unsterblicher ist!

Hermann:
Warum lockst du mein Haar? Liegt nicht der stumme
Tote Vater vor uns? O, hätt' Augustus
Seine Heere geführt, er
Läge noch blutiger da!

Thusnelda:
Lass dein sinkendes Haar mich, Hermann, heben,
Dass es über dem Kranz in Locken drohe!
Siegmar ist bei den Göttern!
Folge du, und wein' ihm nicht nach!

Translation:

Thusnelda:
Ha! there comes he, with sweat, with blood of Romans,
And with dust of the fight all stained! O, never
Saw I Hermann so lovely!
Never such fire in his eyes!

Come! I tremble for joy; hand me the Eagle,
And the red, dripping sword! come, breathe, and rest thee;
Rest thee here in my bosom;
Rest from the terrible fight!

Rest thee, while from thy brow I wipe the big drops,
And the blood from thy cheek! That cheek, how glowing!
Hermann! Hermann! Thusnelda
Never so loved thee before!

No, not then, when thou first, in old oak-shadows,
With that manly brown arm didst wildly grasp me!
Spell-bound I read in thy look
That immortality, then,

Which thou now hast won. Tell to the forests,
Great Augustus, with trembling, amidst his gods now,
Drinks his nectar; for Hermann,
Hermann immortal is found!

Hermann:
Wherefore curl'st thou my hair? Lies not our father
Cold and silent in death? O, had Augustus
Only headed his army,
He should lie bloodier there!

Thusnelda:
Let me lift up thy hair; 'tis sinking, Hermann;
Proudly thy locks should curl above the crown now!
Sigmar is with the immortals!
Follow, and mourn him no more!

== See also ==
- Arminius, 1877 oratorio by Max Bruch
- Die Hermannsschlacht, 1808 play by Heinrich von Kleist
