= Die Freunde von Salamanka =

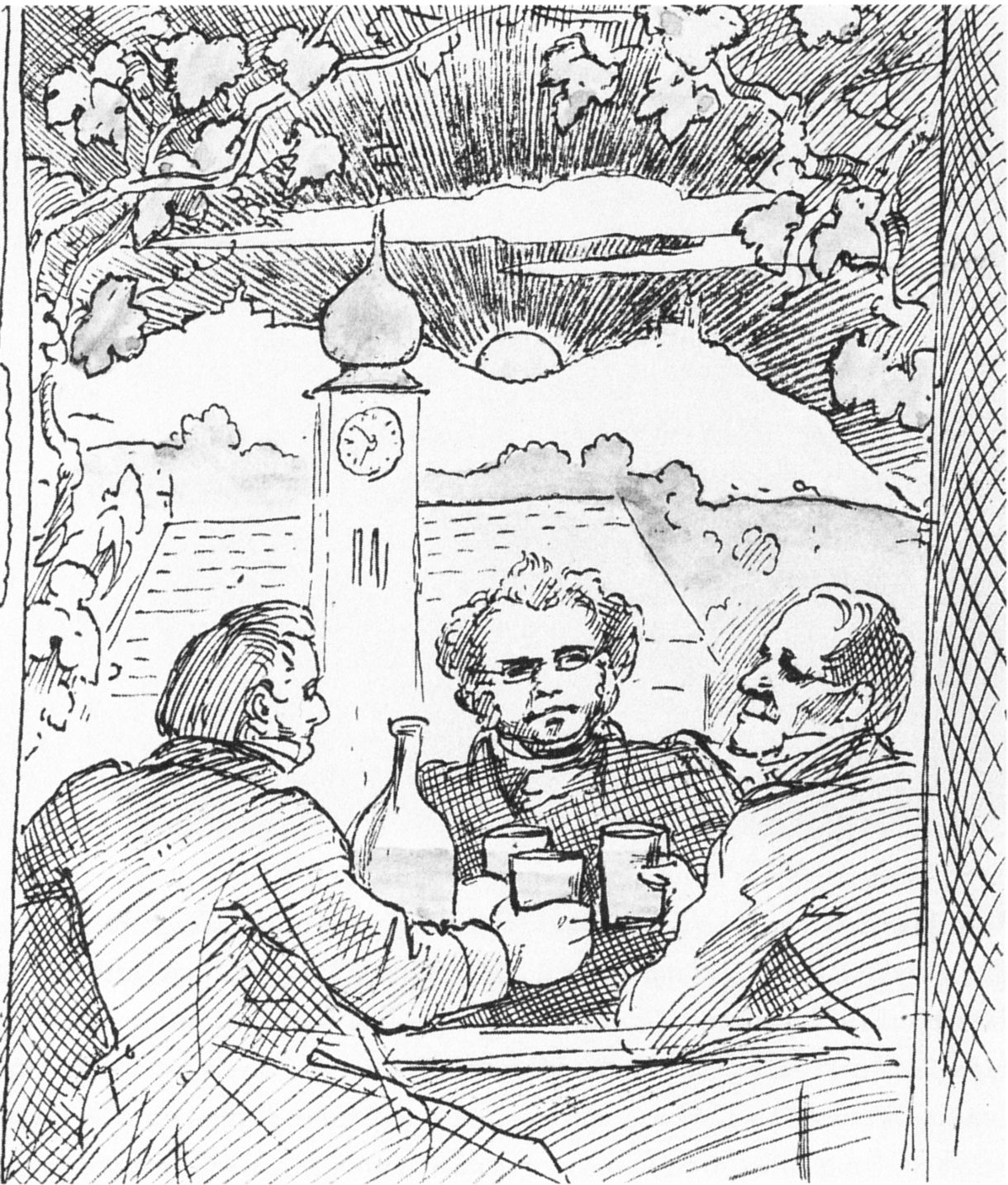
Three friends (Franz Lachner, Schubert, Eduard von Bauernfeld) at a Heuriger, by Moritz von Schwind (1862)

Die Freunde von Salamanka D. 326, is an 1815 Singspiel in two acts by Franz Schubert to a libretto by Johann Mayrhofer.

The opera is set at the beginning of the 19th century in Salamanca, Spain. It consists of an overture and eighteen numbers, and is set for three sopranos, three tenors, six basses, mixed choir and orchestra:

- Act 1
  Overture
1. Introduction: Die Sonne zieht in goldnen Strahlen
2. Aria: Man ist so glücklich und so frei
3. Quartet: Morgen, wenn des Hahnes Ruf erschallt
4. Aria: Einsam schleich’ ich durch die Zimmer
5. Terzet: Lebensmut und frische Kühlung weht mir aus dem trauten Wald
6. Terzet: Freund, wie wird die Sache enden
7. Finale 1: Mild senkt sich der Abend nieder
- Act 2
8. Introduction: Laßt nur alles leichtfertige Wesen
9. Lied: Guerillas zieht durch Feld und Wald
10. Aria: Aus Blumen deuten die Damen gern
11. Duet: Ein wackres Thier, das müßt ihr sagen
12. Duet: Gelagert unter’m hellen Dach der Bäume
13. Aria: Wo ich weile, wo ich gehe
14. Duet: Von tausend Schlangenbissen
15. Romance: Es murmeln die Quellen
16. Terzet: Nichte, Don Diego da, wirbt um deine freie Hand
17. Aria: Traurig geht der Geliebte von dannen
18. Finale 2: Gnäd’ge Frau, ich hab’ die Ehre

== Recordings ==
- Die Freunde von Salamanka, with fragments of Der Spiegelritter, featuring Edith Mathis, Thomas Moser, Hermann Prey, Simeon ten Holt and Theodor Guschlbauer; Deutsche Grammophon 2LP 1981 reissued without the Spiegelritter fragments on one CD by Brilliant Classics.
