= Rastlose Liebe =

Song composed by Franz Schubert

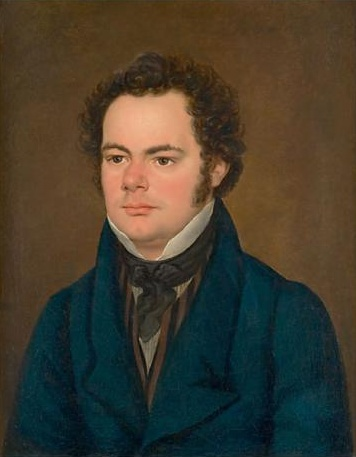
Portrait of Franz Schubert by Franz Eybl (1827)

Schubert-Rastlose liebe-Op 5 n 1 D 138 performed by Luna Celemin and Lucas Huber during the 2023 International Course for the Interpretation of Lied Wolfram Rieger in Barcelona

"Rastlose Liebe" ("Restless Love") is a Lied composed by Franz Schubert and published in July 1821 as Op. 5, No. 1. In Otto Erich Deutsch's catalog it is D138. The song, dedicated to Anton Salieri, is based on a text by Johann Wolfgang von Goethe, written during a snowstorm in the Thuringian Forest.

Schubert made two settings of "Rastlose Liebe": the first, composed 19 May 1815, (original key: E major), was published as Op. 5 No. 1. Its first public performance was given by the tenor Ludwig Titze at a Gesellschaft der Musikfreunde concert in Vienna, on 29 January 1824.

The song has been performed by both male and female voices. The tempo marking of the first version is "Schnell, mit Leidenschaft" (Fast, with passion). The piece contains great dynamic variation.

The second setting, in D major, tempo 'Schnell', written in 1821, was published in 1970 in part IV, volume 1 of the New Schubert Edition.

The poem was also set by Robert Schumann in his Sechs Lieder (Op. 33) and by Anna Schuppe in her “Rastlose Liebe.”

D	Op. pbl	AGA (@IMSLP)	NSA	Name	Lyrics (The LiederNet Archive)	Date	Additional info
138	5,1 (1821) (1970)	XX, 3 No. 177	IV, 1	Rastlose Liebe	Dem Schnee, dem Regen, dem Wind entgegen	19/5/1815; May 1821	Text by Johann Wolfgang von Goethe; Two versions: 1st version, in AGA, is Op. 5 No. 1
