= Gerhard Faulstich =

German baritone

Gerhard Faulstich is a German baritone.

After voice studies at the Musikhochschule Frankfurt, Gerhard Faulstich was active since 1965 as a concert singer. He made his operatic debut at the Musiktheater im Revier in Gelsenkirchen as Leonardo in Wolfgang Fortner's opera Bluthochzeit. In 1981, he joined the Staatsoper Hannover and the faculty of the Musikhochschule Hannover where he is a professor. At the Staatsoper Hannover he performed among others Papageno in Mozart's Die Zauberflöte, Tsar Peter in Lortzing's Zar und Zimmermann, Wolfram in Tannhäuser, and the title role in Wolfgang Rihm's Jakob Lenz. In 1982, he sang Bach's St Matthew Passion, conducted by Erhard Egidi at the Neustädter Kirche, performing the words of Jesus with Lutz Michael Harder as the Evangelist. The same year he recorded the work, conducted by Michel Corboz, alongside Kurt Equiluz as the Evangelist. Reviewer Alan Blyth said that Faulstich "takes an unpretentious, conversational approach to the part of Jesus; he is direct and business-like". In 1989, he performed in Enrico Leone, an opera by Agostino Steffani that had opened the opera house in Hannover in 1689, celebrating 300 years. Faulstich is also noted for his portrayal of Alfonso in Mozart's Così fan tutte, appearing at La Scala of Milan in 1991 and at the Internationale Maifestspiele Wiesbaden in 1993.

Faulstich recorded Bach's Missae (Kyrie and Gloria) with Helmuth Rilling and the Gächinger Kantorei, and cantatas with Diethard Hellmann and Martin Reimann. In 1973, he recorded Georg Philipp Telemann's Lukas-Passion with Uta Spreckelsen, Theo Altmeyer, Adalbert Kraus, Gerd Beusker, conducted by Siegfried Heinrich. In 1979, he recorded Schuberts masses No 1, No. 1, No. 2, No. 3, No. 4 and No. 5 with the Spandauer Kantorei, conducted by Martin Behrmann.

Faulstich wrote a book on teaching voice, "Singen lehren – Singen lernen" (1997, ISBN 3-89639-052-X)
