= Mass No. 3 (Schubert) =

- by Franz Schubert
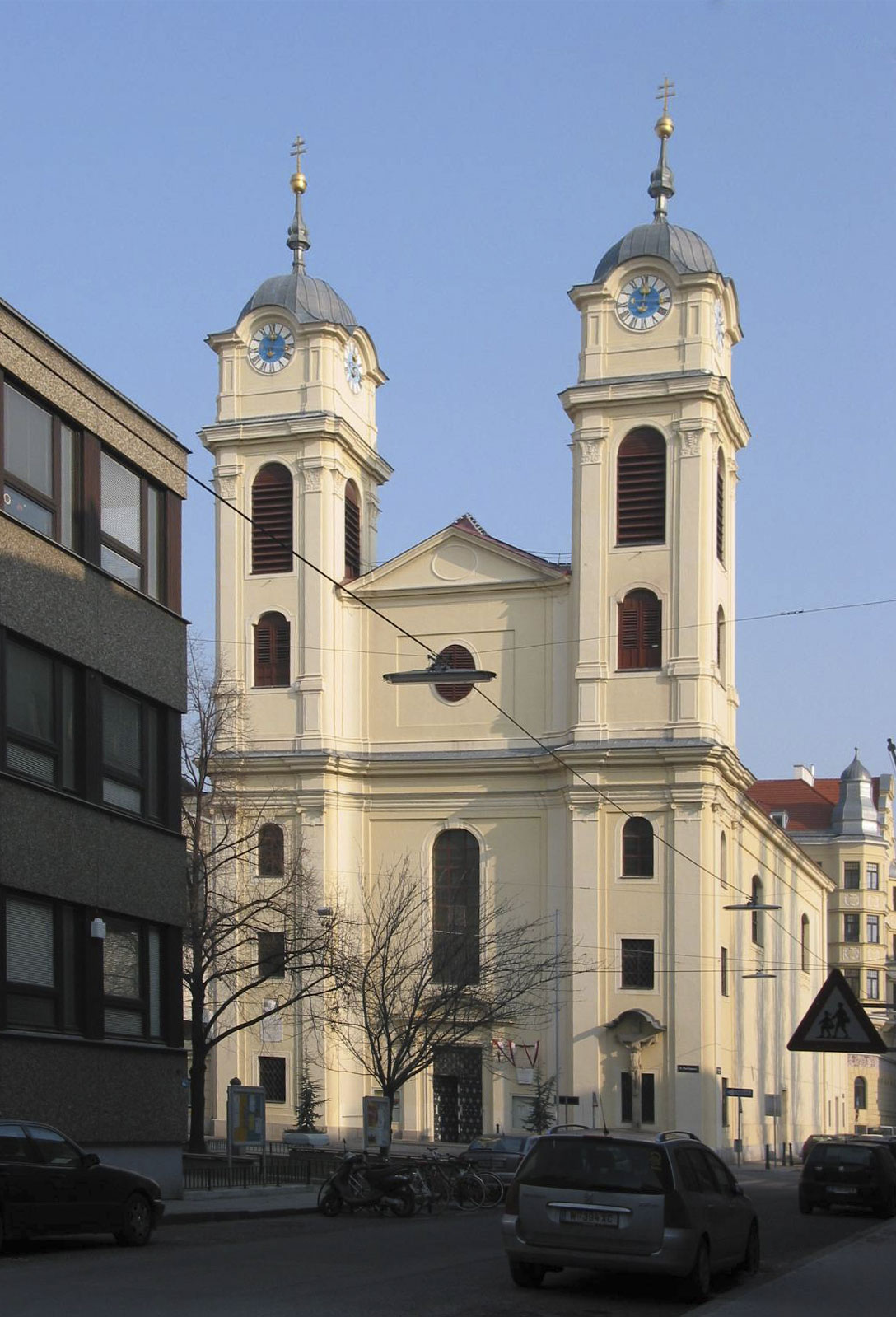
- Lichtental Church
- Key: B♭ major
- Catalogue: D 324
- Year: 1815
- Form: Missa brevis et solemnis
- Movements: 6
- Vocal: SATB choir and soloists
- Instrumental: orchestra and organ

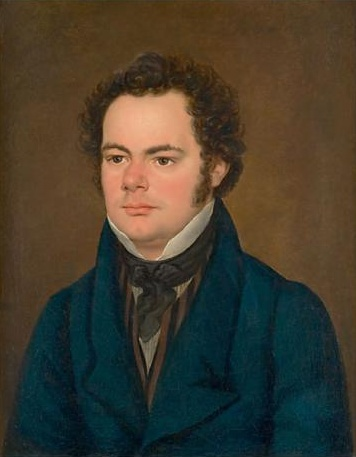
Portrait of Franz Schubert by Franz Eybl (1827)

The Mass No. 3 in B♭ major, D 324, is a mass composed by Franz Schubert in 1815. It is written for four soloists, a four-part choir and orchestra. While by length it could be a missa brevis, its large orchestral force with trumpets, timpani and woodwinds has also led to its classification as a missa solemnis.

== Background ==
Schubert composed this mass setting a few months after his mass in G major, beginning on 11 November 1815. The occasion for which it was composed is unknown; however, it is thought that the soprano soloist in the first performance was Therese Grob. This suggests that it was written for the Lichtental Parish Church; Schubert may also have been attempting to create opportunities to spend time with Grob, with whom he was deeply in love.

Its large orchestral component and extended orchestral interludes have been called "Haydnesque"; the latter's Nelson Mass has been cited as a particularly strong influence. References to Mozart and Bach have also been noted.

While little is now known about the circumstances of the original performance, the mass was familiar outside Vienna. Schubert received a letter from his brother Ferdinand on 6 October 1824, saying that he had been asked to play the organ for a performance of a mass in Hainburg. The mass was by a famous composer whose identity was unknown to the invitees; upon receiving it, Ferdinand recognised his brother's work.

== Structure and scoring ==
The mass consists of six movements. Performances require approximately 30 minutes. It is scored for soprano, alto, tenor and bass soloists, a four-part choir (SATB) and an orchestra of 2 trumpets, timpani, 2 oboes, 2 bassoons, violin I and II, viola and basso continuo (cello, double bass and organ).

In the following table of the movements, the markings, keys and time signatures are taken from the choral score, using the symbol for alla breve (2/2). The voices are abbreviated for the four-part choir (SATB), and the solo voices soprano (S), alto (A), tenor (T) and bass (B).

No.	Part	Incipit	Voices	Marking	Key	Time
1	Kyrie		SATB S A T	Adagio con moto	B♭ major	3/4
2	Gloria		SATB	Allegro vivace	B♭ major	common time
2	Gloria	Gratias agimus tibi	S T	Allegro vivace	B♭ major	common time
2	Gloria	Domine Deus, Rex coelestis	SATB	Allegro vivace	B♭ major	common time
2	Gloria	Domine Deus, Agnus Dei	B T S SATB	Adagio	D minor	3/4
2	Gloria	Quoniam tu solus sanctus	SATB	Allegro vivace	B♭ major	common time
3	Credo	Credo in unum Deum	SATB	Allegro vivace	B♭ major	3/4
3	Credo	Et incarnatus est	B S A T	Adagio	F minor	common time
3	Credo	Crucifixus	SATB	Adagio	F minor	common time
3	Credo	Et resurrexit	SATB	Allegro vivace	B♭ major	3/4
4	Sanctus		SATB	Adagio maestoso	B♭ major	common time
5	Benedictus		S A T B	Andante con moto	F major	common time
5	Benedictus	Osanna	SATB	Andante con moto	B♭ major	common time
6	Agnus Dei		S A T SATB	Andante molto	G minor	common time
6	Agnus Dei	Dona nobis pacem	S A T B SATB	Allegro moderato	B♭ major	6/8

There is an interesting problem in the structure: the music for the Osanna is the same in the Sanctus and the Benedictus, but the tempo indications of the two movements are not the same (first Adagio then Andante). Performers have therefore to decide how to deal with this, either by changing tempo on arriving at the Osanna or by accepting that the same music can in fact be performed at two different tempi.
