= Mass No. 4 (Schubert) =

- by Franz Schubert
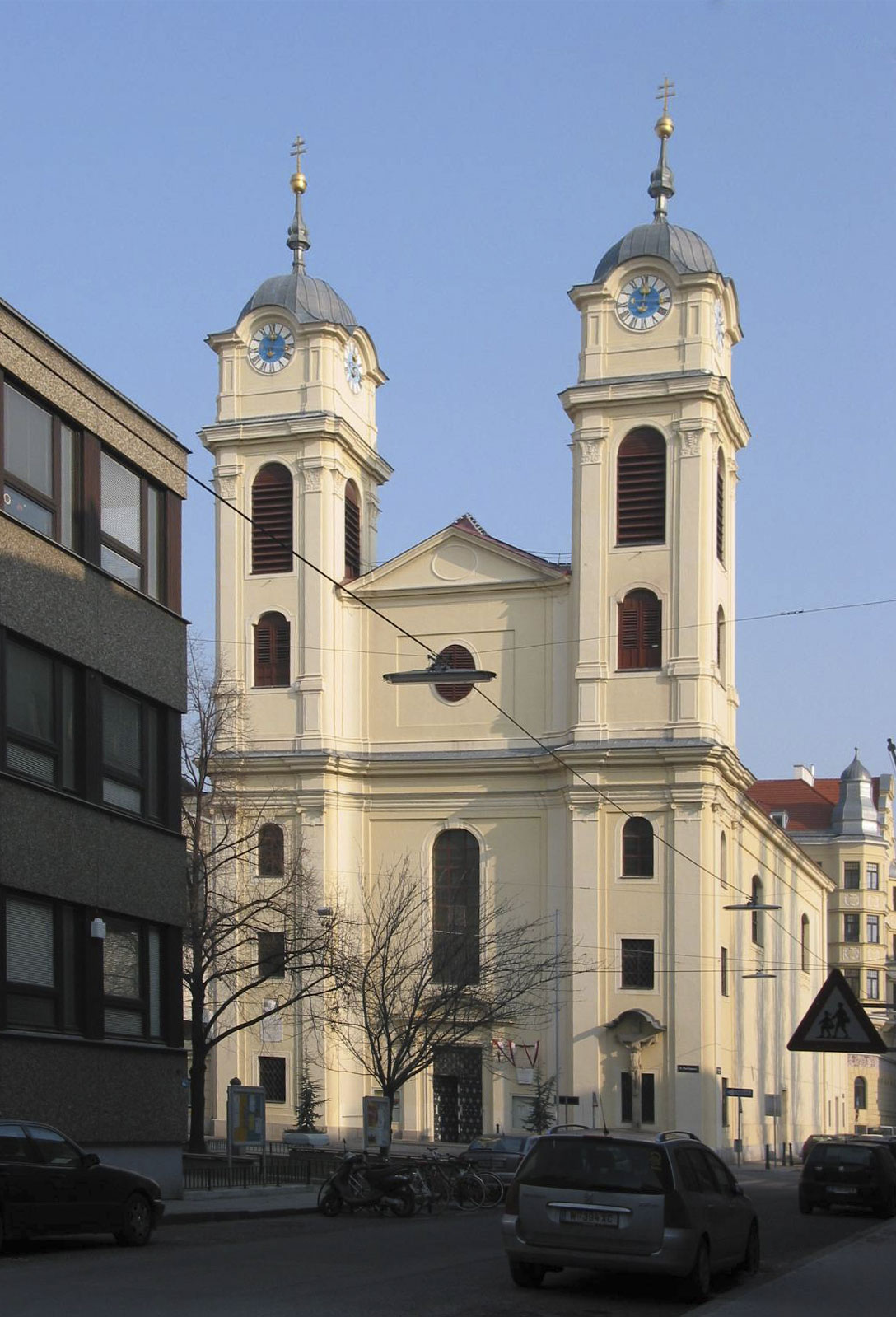
- Lichtental Church
- Key: C major
- Catalogue: D 452
- Year: 1816
- Form: Missa solemnis
- Movements: 6
- Vocal: SATB choir and soloists
- Instrumental: 1816 version: violins and basso continuo; 1825 version: additional wind, brass and timpani

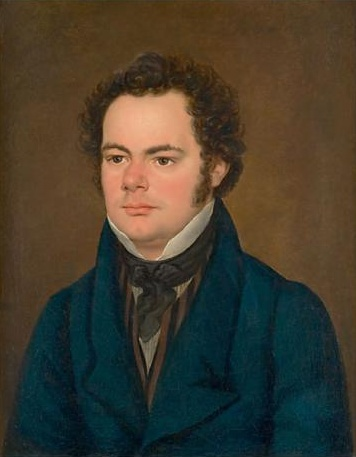
Portrait of Franz Schubert by Franz Eybl (1827)

Mass No. 4 in C major, D 452, is a mass composed by Franz Schubert in 1816. It was originally scored for soprano, alto, tenor and bass soloists, SATB choir, violin I and II, and basso continuo (cello, double bass and organ). It is classified as a missa solemnis.

== Background ==
The setting was composed in June–July 1816, and possibly received its first performance in late summer or early fall of the same year at the Lichtental Church. As in his previous masses, the soprano solos were written with Therese Grob's voice in mind.

The mass shows the influence of Mozart in Schubert's work, particularly in the original reduced orchestration (the Salzburger Kirchentrio, Salzburg church trio) and the perceived "lightness of touch". Schubert's contemporary diary entries confirm his interest in Mozart's missae breves, along with the music of Michael Haydn, another Salzburg composer.

Schubert made considerable revisions to the mass for subsequent performances. He added parts for 2 oboes or clarinets, 2 trumpets and timpani, all ad libitum, for an 1825 performance in St. Ulrich, Vienna. He revisited the mass in 1828, seven weeks before his death, with a purely choral setting of the Benedictus (formerly D. 961) to replace the earlier soprano solo. It is likely that this was in anticipation of a performance where a soloist of Grob's calibre was unavailable.

Schubert sold the score of Mass No. 4 and some shorter church works to Anton Diabelli for publishing in 1825. It was the only mass published during the composer's lifetime. Schubert dedicated the publication to Michael Holzer, the organist and choirmaster at the Lichtental church, and his teacher in organ, singing, figured bass and counterpoint.

== Structure ==
The mass consists of six movements. Performances require approximately 23 minutes. Commentary is for D 452, unless otherwise indicated.

1. Kyrie, Andante con moto, C major, common time
2. Gloria, Allegro vivace, C major, common time
3. Credo, Allegro, C major, 3/4
  Et incarnatus est, Adagio molto, D minor, cut common time
  While Schubert habitually omitted certain passages of the Creed, in this mass he makes the unusual exclusion of the words "ex Maria Virgine" (of the Virgin Mary).
  Et resurrexit, Allegro, C major, 3/4
4. Sanctus, Adagio, C major, common time
  Osanna in excelsis, Allegro vivace, C major, common time
5. Benedictus, Andante, F major, 2/4; soprano solo
  Osanna in excelsis, Allegro vivace, C major, common time
  Benedictus, (D 961) Moderato, A minor, cut common time; choir
  Osanna in excelsis, Allegro vivace, C major, common time
6. Agnus Dei, Adagio, C major, common time
  Dona nobis pacem, Allegro vivace, C major, 3/4
