= 1781 in music =

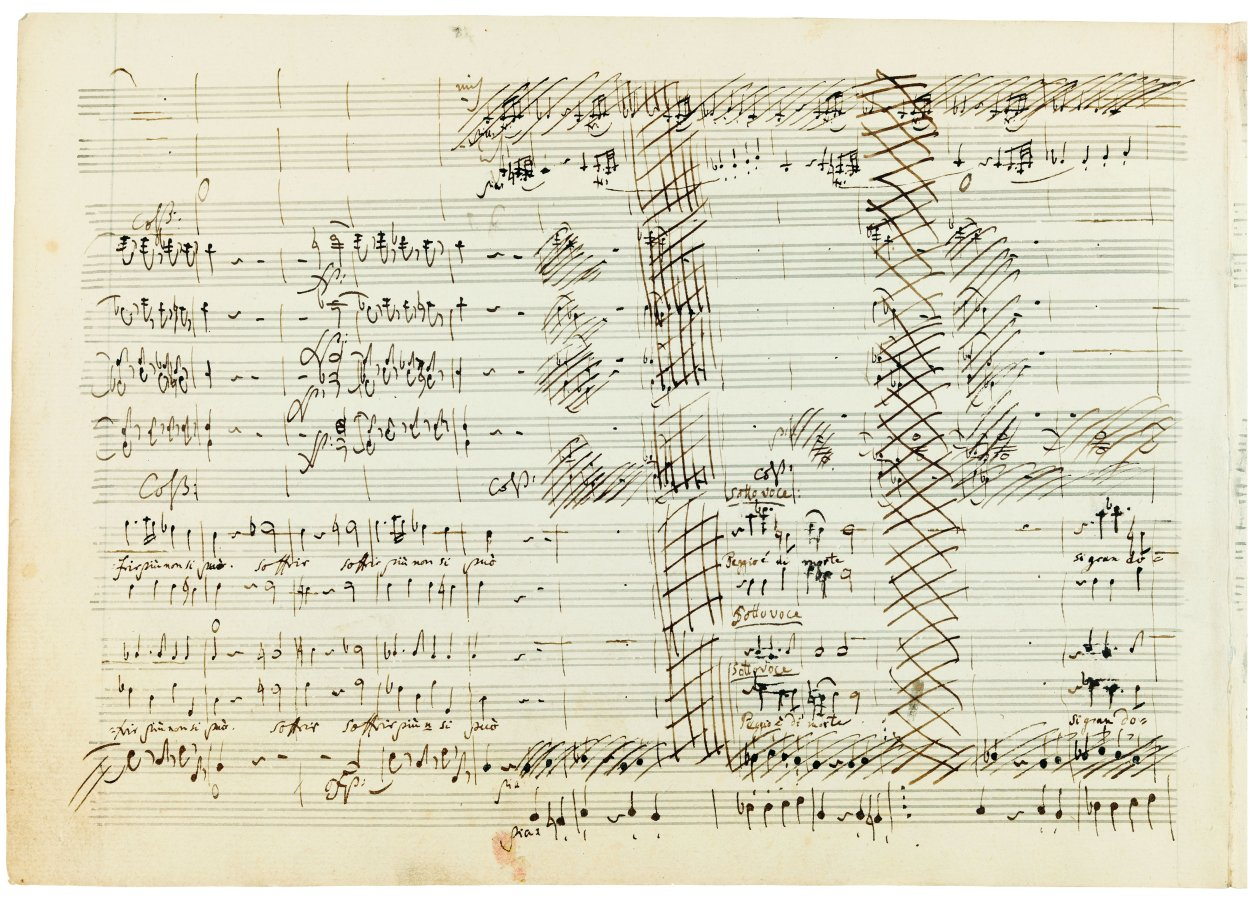
Idomeneo (shown here) was composed by Wolfgang Amadeus Mozart in 1781.

== Events ==
- March – Wolfgang Amadeus Mozart moves to Vienna to pursue his career. Although he is passed over in favour of Antonio Salieri as music teacher of Princess of Württemberg, he never returns permanently to Salzburg.
- Spring – Christian Gottlob Neefe is appointed court organist in Bonn, and soon takes on the young Ludwig van Beethoven as a pupil.
- June 27 – Mozart writes of his new pupil and admirer, Josepha Barbara Auernhammer: "I am almost every day after dinner at H: v: Auernhammer – The freulle is a monster!".
- July 30 – Mozart receives the original libretto of his next opera, Die Entführung aus dem Serail from the director of the Nationalsingspiel, Gottlieb Stephanie.
- October 12 – First bagpipes competition in the Masonic Arms, Falkirk, Scotland.
- October – A British Army band, under Lord Cornwallis, plays the popular song, "The World Turned Upside Down", when surrendering to the Americans after the Siege of Yorktown.
- Étienne Méhul makes his first, unsuccessful attempts at orchestral composition.

== Classical music ==
- Samuel Arnold – 6 Overtures in Eight Parts, Op. 8
- Carl Philipp Emanuel Bach
  - 6 Fugues, Wq.119/2-7
  - Geistliche Gesänge, Book 2 Wq. 198, H. 752
- Johann Christian Bach – Sonata for Keyboard Duet, W.A 19 (Op. 18, No. 5)
- William Billings – The Psalm-Singer's Amusement
- Luigi Boccherini
  - 6 String Quartets, G.207–212 (Op. 33)
  - Stabat Mater, G.532
- Carl Ditters von Dittersdorf – Symphonies after Ovid's Metamorphoses, Kr.73–84
- Joseph Haydn
  - Symphony No.75 in D major, Hob.I:75
  - Horn Concerto No.2 in D major, Hob.VIId:4 (could be by Michael Haydn)
  - 24 Lieder, Hob.XXVIa:1–24
  - Six String Quartets, Op. 33
- Leopold Kozeluch – Sonata for Keyboard in F, "La chasse", Op. 5
- Wolfgang Amadeus Mozart
  - 6 Variations on "Hélas, j'ai perdu mon amant", K.360/374b
  - Serenade in B-flat major, Gran Partita (or possibly 1782), K. 361
  - Misera, dove son!, K.369
  - Rondo in E-flat major, K.371
  - Serenade in E-flat major, K.375
  - Violin Sonata in F major, K.376/374d
  - Violin Sonata in F major, K.377/374e
  - Violin Sonata in G major, K.379/373a
  - Violin Sonata in E-flat major, K.380/374f
  - Sonata for 2 Pianos in D major, K.448/375a
- Giovanni Paisiello – Concerto for Keyboard No. 1 in C major
- John Parry – British harmony, being a collection of antient Welsh airs ... carefully compiled and now first published with some additional variations (Ruabon, London: John Parry & Peter Hodgson)
- Antonio Rosetti – 6 Flute Concerti
- Charlotte Amelie Sachsen-Gotha-Altenburg – Canzonette fürs Klavier mit Veränderungen
- Samuel Wesley – Concerto for Violin No. 2 in D major
- Paul Wranitzky – Sinfonie Périodique No.2 in C minor (Op. 11)

== Opera ==
- Miles Peter Andrews & Samuel Arnold – The Baron Kinkvervankotsdorsprakingatchdern
- Antonio Calegari – Deucalione e Pirra
- Domenico Cimarosa
  - Alessandro nell'Indie
  - L'amante combattuto dalle donne di punto
  - Giannina e Bernardone
  - Giunio Bruto
  - Il pittore parigino
- Elizabeth Craven et al. – The Silver Tankard
- Nicolas Dalayrac – Le Chevalier à la mode
- Marc-Antoine Désaugiers – Les Deux sylphes
- Joseph Haydn – La fedeltà premiata
- Wolfgang Amadeus Mozart – Idomeneo
- Niccolò Piccinni – Iphigenie en Tauride
- Antonio Salieri – Der Rauchfangkehrer
- Giuseppe Sarti – Giulio Sabino
- Niccolò Antonio Zingarelli – Montesuma

== Methods and theory writings ==
- Marmaduke Overend – A Brief Account of, and an Introduction to, 8 Lectures in the Science of Music
- Christoph Benjamin Schmidtchen – Kurzgefaßte Anfangsgründe auf das Clavier für Anfänger

== Births ==
- January 22 – François Antoine Habeneck, violinist and conductor (died 1849)
- March 11 – Anthony Philip Heinrich, composer (died 1861)
- March 18 – Gustave Vogt, composer and oboist (died 1870)
- May 24 – Louis-François Dauprat, French composer (died 1868)
- July 20 – Sophie Lebrun, pianist and composer, daughter of Ludwig August Lebrun (died 1863)
- July 27 – Mauro Giuliani, guitarist, cellist and composer (died 1829)
- September 1 – Antoine Romagnesi (composer and publisher (died 1850)
- September 5 – Anton Diabelli, music publisher, editor and composer (died 1858)
- September 6 – Vincent Novello, organist and conductor (died 1861)
- November 9 – Carl Borromäus von Miltitz, composer (died 1845)
- November 18 – Felice Blangini, organist and composer (died 1841)
- December 1 – Charles Philippe Lafont, violinist and composer (died 1839)

== Deaths ==
- January 22 – Johann Siebenkas, composer
- February 4 – Josef Mysliveček, composer (b. 1737)
- March 17 – Johannes Ewald, librettist and dramatist (born 1743)
- May 22 – Garret Wesley, 1st Earl of Mornington, composer (born 1735)
- July 11 – Adolph Carl Kunzen, composer
- July 30 – Augustin Ullinger, composer
- August 16 – Johanna Carolina Bach, daughter of JS Bach (born 1737)
- October 9 – Thomas Erskine, 6th Earl of Kellie, musician and composer (b. 1732)
- October 27 – Herman-François Delange
- October – Anton Zimmermann, composer
- November 4 – Faustina Bordoni, operatic mezzo-soprano (b. 1697)
- date unknown – William Paxton, cellist (b. 1737)
