= Caterina Cavalieri =

Austrian operatic soprano (1755–1801)

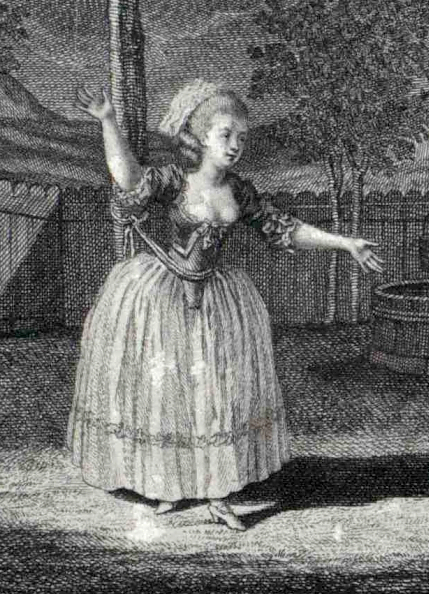
- Cavalieri as Sophie in Die Bergknappen, 1779

Background information
- Born: Katharina Magdalena Josepha Cavalier; 19 February 1760; Lichtental, Vienna, Austria
- Died: 30 June 1801 (aged 41) Austria
- Genre: Opera
- Occupation: Opera singer
- Instrument: Singing

Caterina Magdalena Giuseppa Cavalieri (born 19 February 1760; died 30 June 1801) was an Austrian soprano. She was known for moving between her ranges with ease, her chest voice, and her stamina. Her career was based almost entirely in Vienna. It was in that same city she debuted at the Kärntnertortheater in 1775. She then had 18 leading roles when singing with a group of Italian group singers.

== Biography ==
Born as Katharina Magdalena Josepha Cavalier (Note: Other spellings of her first name are Catarina and Katerina.) in Lichtental, Vienna, Cavalieri studied voice with composer Antonio Salieri.

Her stage debut at Kärntnertortheater was in 1775 in Pasquale Anfossi's opera La finta giardiniera. This was followed by Ignaz Umlauf's Singspiel Die Bergknappen in 1778 and the role of Fräule Nannette in Salieri's Der Rauchfangkehrer on 30 April 1781, a role specifically written for her to display her virtuosity. Similarly, Wolfgang Amadeus Mozart wrote the role of Konstanze in his Singspiel Die Entführung aus dem Serail for her, which she premiered on 16 July 1782. Mozart also rewrote "Dove sono" in Le Nozze di Figaro in 1789 to suit it more to Cavalieri's voice. Mozart was very intruiged by her as a vocalist and performer. On 1 June 1785, she sang the role of Enrichetta in the première of Stephen Storace's Gli sposi malcontenti. On 7 May 1788, Cavalieri sang the role of Donna Elvira in the Vienna première of Mozart's Don Giovanni. Other works by Mozart written for her are Davide penitente (1785) and the role of Mademoiselle Silberklang in Der Schauspieldirektor (1786).

External image
- Cavalieri rehearsing with Mozart, engraving

After 1790, Cavalieri gradually withdrew from the stage and retired on 1 March 1793. She died unmarried in Vienna in 1801, aged 41.

Cavalieri is a nonspeaking role in Peter Shaffer's play Amadeus, where she is portrayed as Salieri's love interest. The speaking role of Cavalieri in the 1984 Oscar-winning film based on that play is played by Christine Ebersole and sung by Suzanne Murphy. In the film, it is suggested that Cavalieri and Mozart had an affair during the rehearsals of Die Entführung aus dem Serail.

== General references ==
- Carl Ferdinand Pohl (1876). "Cavalieri, Catharina" . Allgemeine Deutsche Biographie (in German). Vol. 4. Leipzig: Duncker & Humblot. pp. 76–77.
- “Cavalieri, Caterina (1760–1801) | Encyclopedia.com.” Encyclopedia.com, 2026, www.encyclopedia.com/women/encyclopedias-almanacs-transcripts-and-maps/cavalieri-caterina-1760-1801. Accessed 5 May 2026.
- Constantin von Wurzbach: "Cavallieri, Katharina." In: Biographisches Lexikon des Kaiserthums Oesterreich (Biographical Lexicon of the Empire of Austria). Part 14 Kaiserlich-königliche Hof- und Staatsdruckerei, Vienna 1865, p. 413 f. (digitalised).
- Gidwitz, Patricia Lewy. ““Ich Bin Die Erste Sängerin” Vocal Profiles of Two Mozart Sopranos.” Early Music, vol. XIX, no. 4, Nov. 1991, pp. 565–579. JSTOR, https://doi.org/10.1093/earlyj/xix.4.565. Accessed 25 Oct. 2022.
