= Lichtental Parish Church =

- Lichtentaler Pfarrkirche zu den heiligen vierzehn Nothelfern
- Schubertkirche
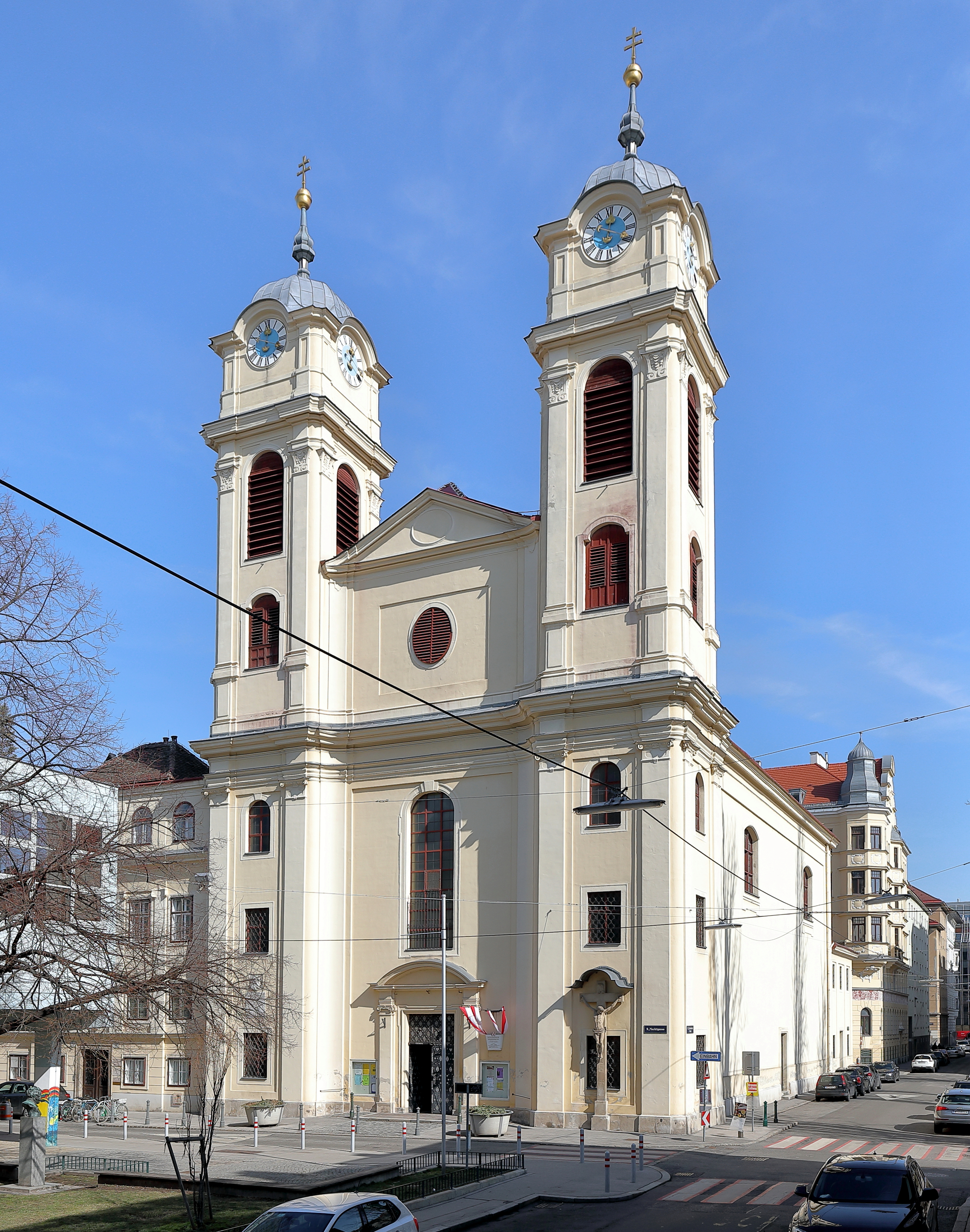
- Front of the Lichtental Church

- 48.22739°N 16.35802°E
- Location: Lichtental
- Country: Austria
- Denomination: Roman Catholic
- Website: www.schubertkirche.at

History
- Consecrated: 1730 to the Fourteen Holy Helpers

Architecture
- Architects: Johann Lukas von Hildebrandt; Andrea Pozzo
- Style: Baroque; Neoclassical
- Groundbreaking: 1712

The Lichtental Parish Church (Lichtentaler Pfarrkirche) is the Catholic parish church of Lichtental, now part of Vienna, Austria. Officially the Lichtentaler Pfarrkirche zu den heiligen vierzehn Nothelfern, it is dedicated to the Fourteen Holy Helpers. The church has elements of Baroque and Neoclassical architecture. It is also known as the Schubertkirche (Schubert Church), because Franz Schubert was baptised there in 1797 and wrote several compositions for use in the church, including his first Mass for the centenary, first performed on 25 September 1814.

== History ==
After the suburb Lichtental was founded at the turn of the 18th century, religious services were first held at the local brewery. In 1711 a chapel consecrated to St. Anna was built in the middle of the new settlement. In 1712, Charles VI laid the foundation for a church. The building was probably designed by Johann Lukas von Hildebrandt and Andrea Pozzo. The first Solemn Mass was held in 1714, although the church was still unfinished.

In 1723, Lichtental became an independent parish. The first pastor was Carl de Giorgio. The building was completed in 1730 and consecrated to the Fourteen Holy Helpers. An organ was installed in 1738. Facing a rapidly growing population, the church was expanded to its present size, from 1769 to 1773. The foundation was laid by Maria Theresia. It shows elements of the transition from Baroque to Neoclassical architecture.

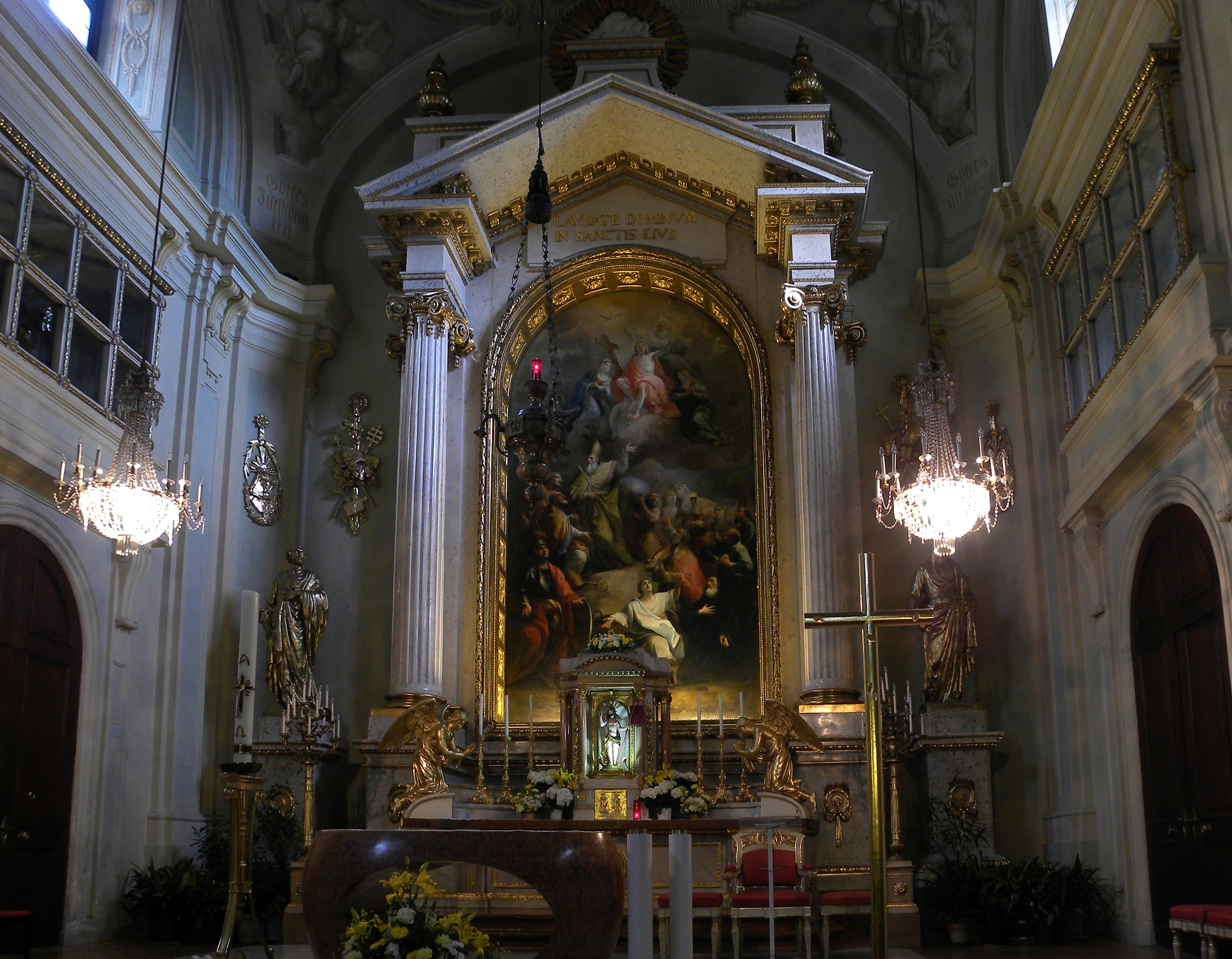
Altar

The plans were designed by Joseph Ritter and Thaddäus Kärner. The high altar was created in 1776 by court architect Ferdinand Hetzendorf von Hohenberg. Franz Anton Zoller, a member of the Academy of Fine Arts, created its painting, showing the Fourteen Holy Helpers. The second tower was finished only in 1827.

== Schubert ==
Composer Franz Schubert was baptised in the church on 1 February 1797. It was here he received his first musical training. In 1814, at age 17, he was commissioned to compose a missa solemnis for the centenary of the church, his first mass in F major. He conducted its first performance on 25 September 1814. His later Masses in G major, B-flat major and C major were also composed for Lichtental Church, as well as other sacred music.

== Literature ==
- Erich Benedikt: Franz Schubert und die Pfarrkirche Lichtental. Verlag St. Peter, Salzburg 1997, ISBN 3-900173-61-3
- Erich Benedikt: Die Musikhandschriften des Pfarrarchivs Wien-Lichtental. Verlag Der Apfel, Wien 2006, ISBN 3-85450-222-2
- Alfred Wolf: Alsergrund-Chronik. Von der Römerzeit bis zum Ende der Monarchie. Wien 1981
