= St. Ulrich's Church, Vienna =

St. Ulrich
- Pfarrkirche hl. Ulrich und Maria Trost
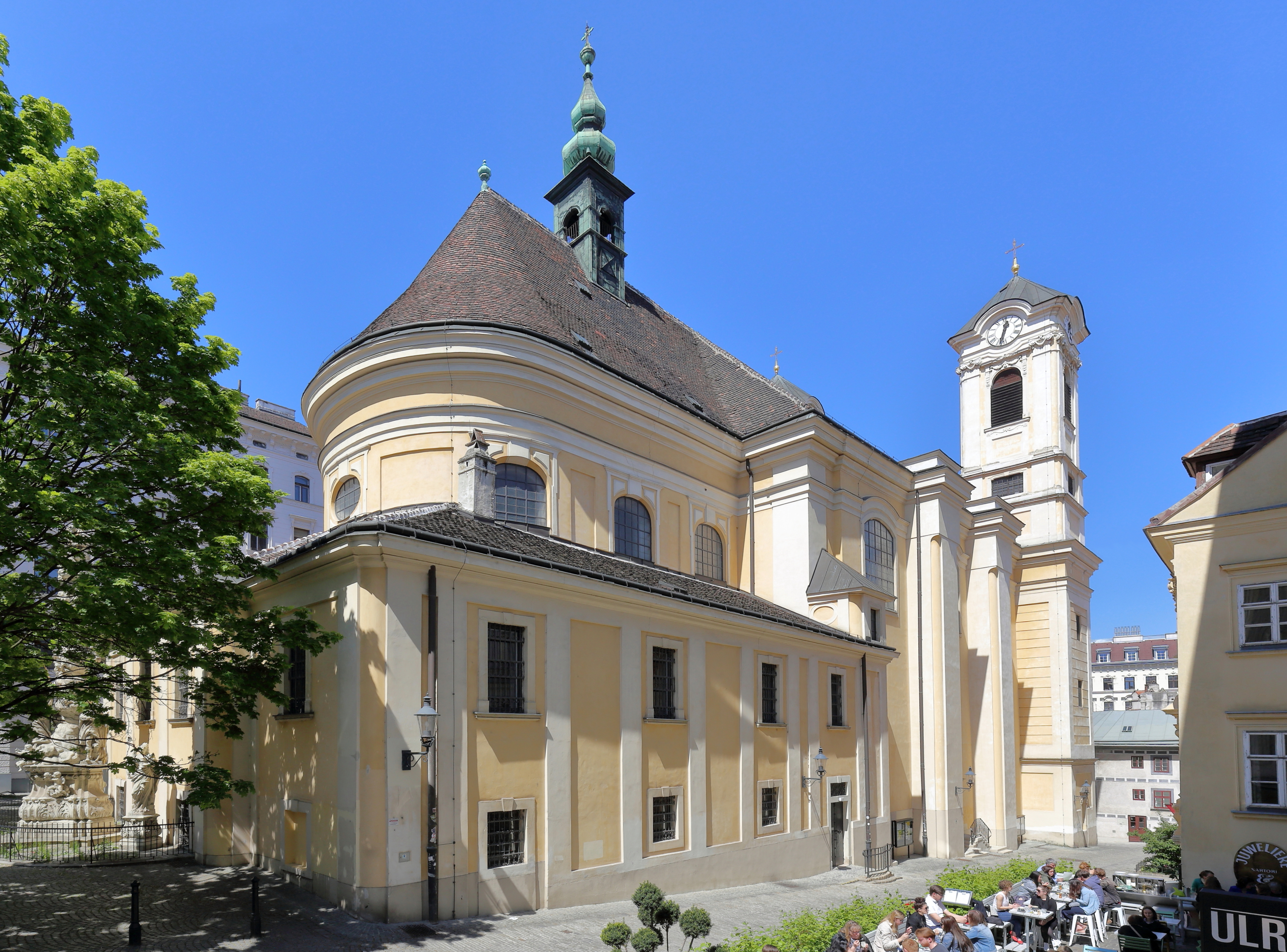

- 48°12′16″N 16°21′09″E
- Location: Vienna
- Country: Austria
- Denomination: Roman Catholic
- Website: www.stulrich.com

History
- Consecrated: 1724 to St. Ulrich and St. Mary

Architecture
- Architect: Josef Reymund
- Style: Baroque
- Groundbreaking: 1721

St. Ulrich is a Roman Catholic parish and church in Neubau, the 7th district of Vienna, Austria. The official name of the church is Pfarrkirche hl. Ulrich und Maria Trost (Parish church of St. Ulrich and Mary's consolation), it is also known as Ulrichskirche. The Baroque hall church with two towers was built in 1721. It is consecrated to St. Ulrich and St. Mary.

== Location ==
The church is located at the square St.-Ulrichs-Platz, on the slope between the higher Burggasse and the deeper Neustiftgasse. It faces Neustiftgasse with a two-tower facade, while the choir is close to Burggasse. The formerly independent suburban community St. Ulrich (de) is named after the chapel which preceded the church.

== History ==
The first building named after St. Ulrich was a chapel consecrated in 1211.

In 1699, the parish received a Gnadenbild, an image of Mary after the statue Gnadenbild Maria Trost close to Graz. A wooden copy of the copy was installed on the high altar.

The present church was built from 1721 to 1724 by architect Josef Reymund; additional buildings were completed in 1752, and the towers in 1771. The southern gable facade is flanked by two recessed towers with tent roofs, originally onion helmets. The north-facing choir carries a roof turret with an onion dome. The stairs to the main entrance are flanked by stone figures of Saints Benedict, Ulrich, Aloysius and Johannes Nepomuk, by sculptor Franz Xaver Seegen (1724-1780), who also created a figure of St. Ulrich in the facade. Altars of red stucco marble, created in the second half of the 18th century, hold white figures by Seegen. The altarpiece, Vision of St. Ulrich at the Battle of Lechfeld, was painted in 1750 by Paul Troger. Franz Anton Maulbertsch created around 1750 an altarpiece showing the martyrdom of St Judas Thaddeus. Josef Ignaz Mildorfer painted an altarpiece "Abschied des Apostels Petrus von Paulus" (St. Peter leaving St. Paul).

== Music ==
Schubert's Mass No. 4, a missa solemnis in C-major, was performed in the church in 1825 in an expanded orchestration. The organ was built in 1842 by Josef Loyp in a neoclassical housing. It was restored in 1979 by Gregor Hradetzky.

== Literature ==
- Dehio-Handbuch. Die Kunstdenkmäler Österreichs: Wien. II. bis IX. und XX. Bezirk, VII. Bezirk Neubau, Kirchen, ULRICHS-KIRCHE. Pfarrkirche hl. Ulrich und Maria Trost. Verlag Anton Schroll & Co, Wien 1993, ps. 284ff, ISBN 3-7031-0680-8.
