= Der Rauchfangkehrer =

Opera by Antonio Salieri

- Opera by Antonio Salieri
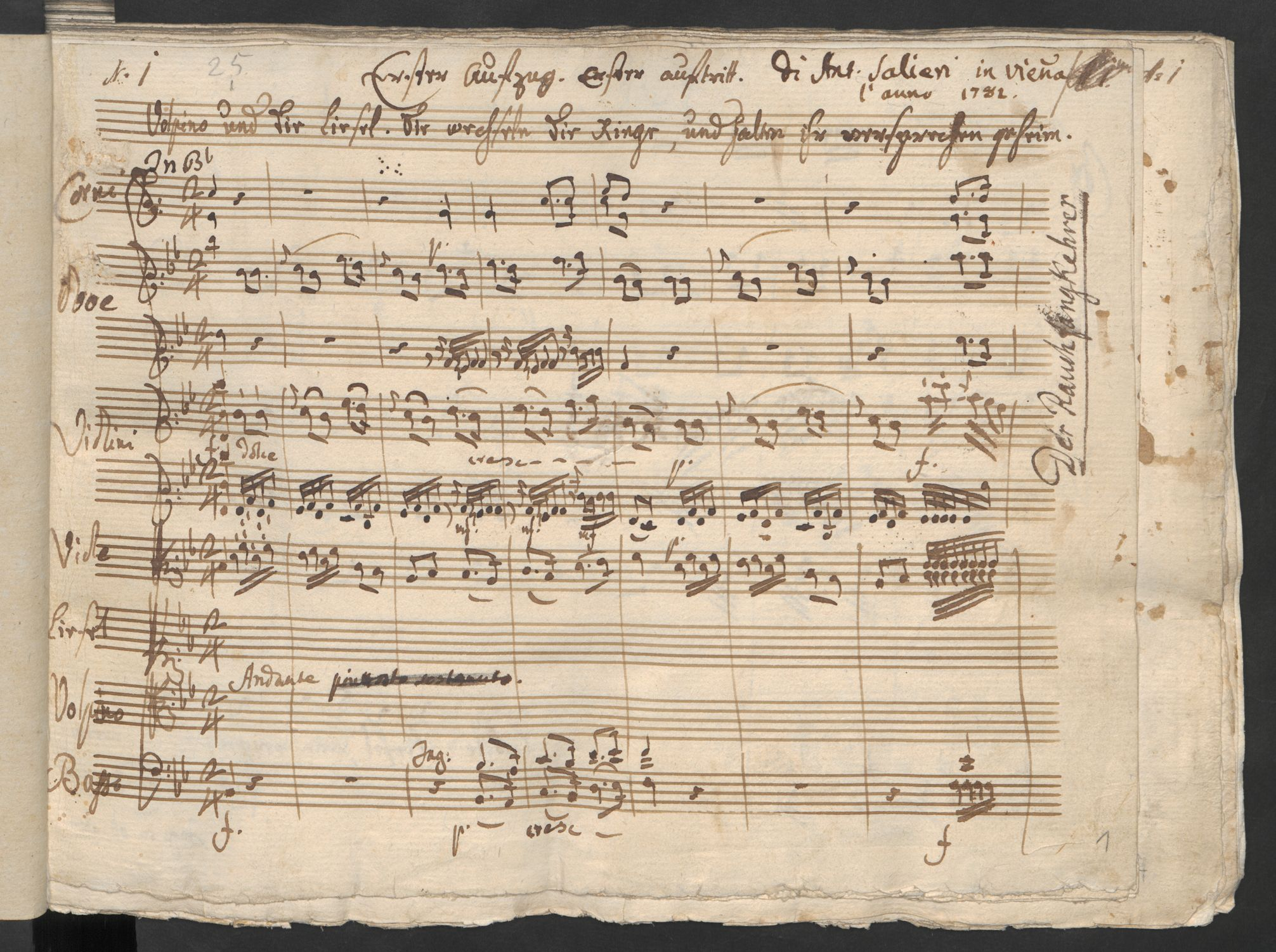
- Autograph of the beginning
- Librettist: Leopold Auenbrugger
- Language: German
- Premiere: 30 April 1781; Burgtheater, Vienna

Der Rauchfangkehrer, oder Die Unentbehrlichen Verräther ihrer Herrschaften aus Eigennutz (The Chimney Sweep, or The Indispensable Betrayers of Their Lordships out of Self-interest) is an opera in three acts by Antonio Salieri to a German libretto by Leopold Auenbrugger. Originally designated as a Musikalisches Lustspiel (musical comedy), the work has the characteristics of both a German Singspiel and an Italian opera buffa.

The musical work was referred to as a practice in "the [German] language" for Salieri, as Joseph II put it. Here, Salieri was able to create virtuoso roles for some of the most famous singers of Vienna: Caterina Cavalieri, who created the role of Konstanze in Mozart's Die Entführung aus dem Serail, and Ludwig Fischer, who created the role of Osmin in the same opera. Fräule Nannette (Cavalieri) sings brilliant showpiece arias in her quest for Volpino's love, notably "Wenn dem Adler das Gefieder", and Herr von Bär (Fischer) consistently exhibits his ursine qualities by going down to E2 and D2 his two arias. Additionally, the opera brings out very much humour and entertainment through Volpino's astute character and the ladies' infatuation with him.

== Performance history ==
Commissioned by Emperor Joseph II for his German company, it was first performed on 30 April 1781 at the Burgtheater in Vienna. It was given 13 times between then and 5 July 1782. It later gained popularity in northern Germany, where it was consistently revived until the early 1900s.

The first performance in our days was on 14 November 2011 in Graz, Austria, the hometown of the librettist Leopold Auenbrugger. The opera saw its Australian premiere in English as The Chimney Sweep in 2014 by Pinchgut Opera.

== Roles ==
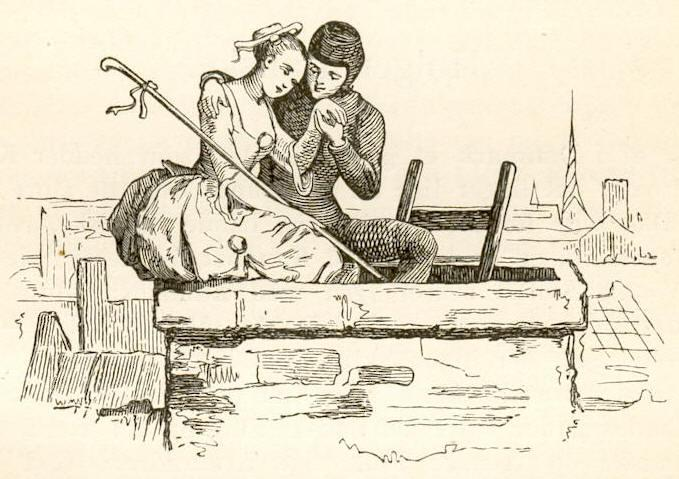
Amorous chimney sweep

Roles, voice types, premiere cast
Role	Voice type	Premiere cast, 30 April 1781
Volpino, an astute and musical Italian chimney sweep	tenor	Gottfried Schmidt
Lisel, a cook, engaged to Volpino	soprano	Anna Haselbeck-Schindler
Frau von Habicht, a wealthy young widow and retired opera singer	soprano	Barbara Fischer
Fräule Nannette, her stepdaughter	soprano	Caterina Cavalieri
Herr von Bär, an ambitious nobleman wooing Frau von Habicht	bass	Ludwig Fischer
Herr von Wolf, an ambitious nobleman wooing Fraule Nannette	tenor	Joseph Souter
Johann, servant to Frau von Habicht	bass	Friedrich Günther
Tomaso, a chimney master	bass	Johann Hoffmann
Jakob, servant to Herr von Wolf	tenor	
Peter, servant to Herr von Bär	bass	
Assistants and apprentices to Tomaso

== Synopsis ==
Setting: The rich mansion of Frau von Habicht during the late 1800s, located in a German capital city.

An amorous intrigue in which Volpino, the chimney sweep, and Lisel, the cook, connive at receiving a dowry from their social betters, Herr von Bär and Herr von Wolf. Volpino accomplishes this task by enamoring Frau von Habicht and Fraule Nannette through music, later persuading the noblemen, who are wooing the ladies, to provide him money in order to disenchant the women.

== Recordings ==
Year	Volpino, Lisel, Frau von Habicht, Fräule Nannette, Herr von Bär, Herr von Wolf,	Conductor, opera house and orchestra	Label
2015	Stuart Haycock, Alexandra Oomens, Amelia Farrugia, Janet Todd, David Woloszko; Christopher Saunders	Erin Helyard, Orchestra and chorus of the Pinchgut Opera, Sydney	CD: Pinchgut Live; PG005
