= Ludwig Fischer (bass) =

German operatic bass (1745–1825)

Johann Ignaz Ludwig Fischer (c. 18 August 1745 – 10 July 1825), commonly called Ludwig Fischer, was a German opera singer, a notable bass of his time.

== Life ==
Ludwig Fischer was born in Mainz on 18 or 19 August 1745. Fischer began his musical studies not as a singer but with the violin and cello. When he was heard singing in a church choir and in student operetta productions, his voice was noticed and he took up singing seriously. He was then made a supernumerary singer in the Electoral court of Mainz. Starting in 1770, he studied voice with the tenor Anton Raaff in Mannheim, where he had first sung professionally on stage in 1767.

He continued to rise to prominence in Mannheim. In 1772 he was appointed virtuoso da camera at the Mannheim court, and Prince-elector Karl Theodor gave him a scholarship to enable him to continue his studies with Raaff. In 1775 he became responsible for singing instruction in the Mannheim Seminarium Musicum. By 1778 he was the highest-paid of the Mannheim court singers.

In 1778, Karl Theodor became Elector of Bavaria, and he moved most of his Mannheim musicians with him, Fischer included, to the new court in Munich.

While in Munich, Fischer married on 6 October 1779 the singer Barbara Strasser (born 1758 in Mannheim), who sang with him in Vienna and was pensioned in 1798. The children of this marriage all became distinguished singers: Joseph Fischer (born 1780 in Vienna, died 1862 in Mannheim), Josepha Fischer-Vernier (born 1782, died 1854 in Mannheim), and Wilhelmine (born 1785).

In 1779, Fischer moved to the Nationaltheater (today's Burgtheater) in Vienna (1779). He stayed in Vienna for three years, singing about twenty different roles. In 1783 he sang with extraordinary success in Paris, in 1784 in the principal cities of Italy; starting 1785 he sang at the court of Karl Anselm, 4th Prince of Thurn and Taxis in Regensburg, and in 1789 accepted a permanent appointment, made through the intercession of Johann Friedrich Reichardt, at the Italian Opera in Berlin, where he worked until retiring on pension in 1815. He took some breaks from his Berlin job to sing as a guest artist in other cities: Vienna (1787, 1798), London (1794, 1798, 1812).

Fischer died 10 July 1825 in Berlin.

== Roles ==
Fischer is perhaps best remembered today for the role of Osmin in Die Entführung aus dem Serail, a part "tailor made" for him by Mozart and which he sang in the premiere production (first performance 16 July 1782,) during the Vienna phase of his career. A year earlier, Antonio Salieri was inspired by his remarkable vocal range in composing his comic opera Der Rauchfangkehrer, writing for him the role of Herr von Bär. Further roles were Axur in Salieri's Axur, re d'Ormus, Osroes in Semiramide and Brenno in the eponymous opera by Reichardt.

== Compositions ==
Apparently Fischer was also a composer but most of his work has not survived. In 1802 he composed the "popular" drinking song "Im tiefen Keller sitz' ich hier". Its two-octave range (F_{2} to F_{4}) is perhaps unusual for a popular song, but would not have been a barrier for the composer; see below.

== Fischer and Mozart ==
Fischer was evidently a friend of Mozart's. When he got into a disagreement with the Imperial theatre manager, Count Orsini-Rosenberg, and decided to leave Vienna, Mozart gave him a letter of introduction to help him as he pursued his career (successfully) in Paris. In 1787, when Fischer returned to Vienna for a visit, Mozart created for him the aria "Alcandro, lo confesso...Non sò, d'onde viene", K. 512, which he sang at a concert he gave in the Kärntnertortheater on 21 March. Mozart may also have written another work for Fischer, the recitative and aria "Così dunque tradisci...Aspri rimorsi atroci" (K. 432/421a).

Shortly after, on April 1, Fischer wrote a 16-line poem of friendship in Mozart's album, whose last four lines (in English) are:

Wilt thou my devotion know?
This my recompense shall be:
Be my friend, for long ago
Hast thou a friend in me.

In 1796 (28 February), Fischer participated in a memorial concert for Mozart organized by his widow Constanze; he sang excerpts from La clemenza di Tito.

== Assessment ==
A critic for the Deutsches Museum of Leipzig, writing in 1781, called him "the foremost bass in Germany, and after Günther [possibly Friedrich Günther (1750 – after 1800)], the one who acts best". According to Corneilson, this was a generally held view: "In his day Fischer was regarded as Germany’s leading serious bass singer." Fischer could sing from a low D_{2} to a high A_{4}, and he controlled this extraordinary range with unusual lightness, purity, and precision. Reichardt said of his voice that it displayed "the depth of a cello and the natural height of a tenor."

Mozart was evidently delighted by Fischer's abilities. He added a major aria to the first act of Die Entführung, "Solche hergelauf'ne Laffen", explaining to his father by letter (26 September 1781) that "one must make good use of such a man"; adding that (as Clive says) "the new aria would provide an opportunity for Fischer's 'beautiful low notes' to glow".
