= Augustinian Church, Vienna =

Church in Vienna, Austria

Augustinerkirche
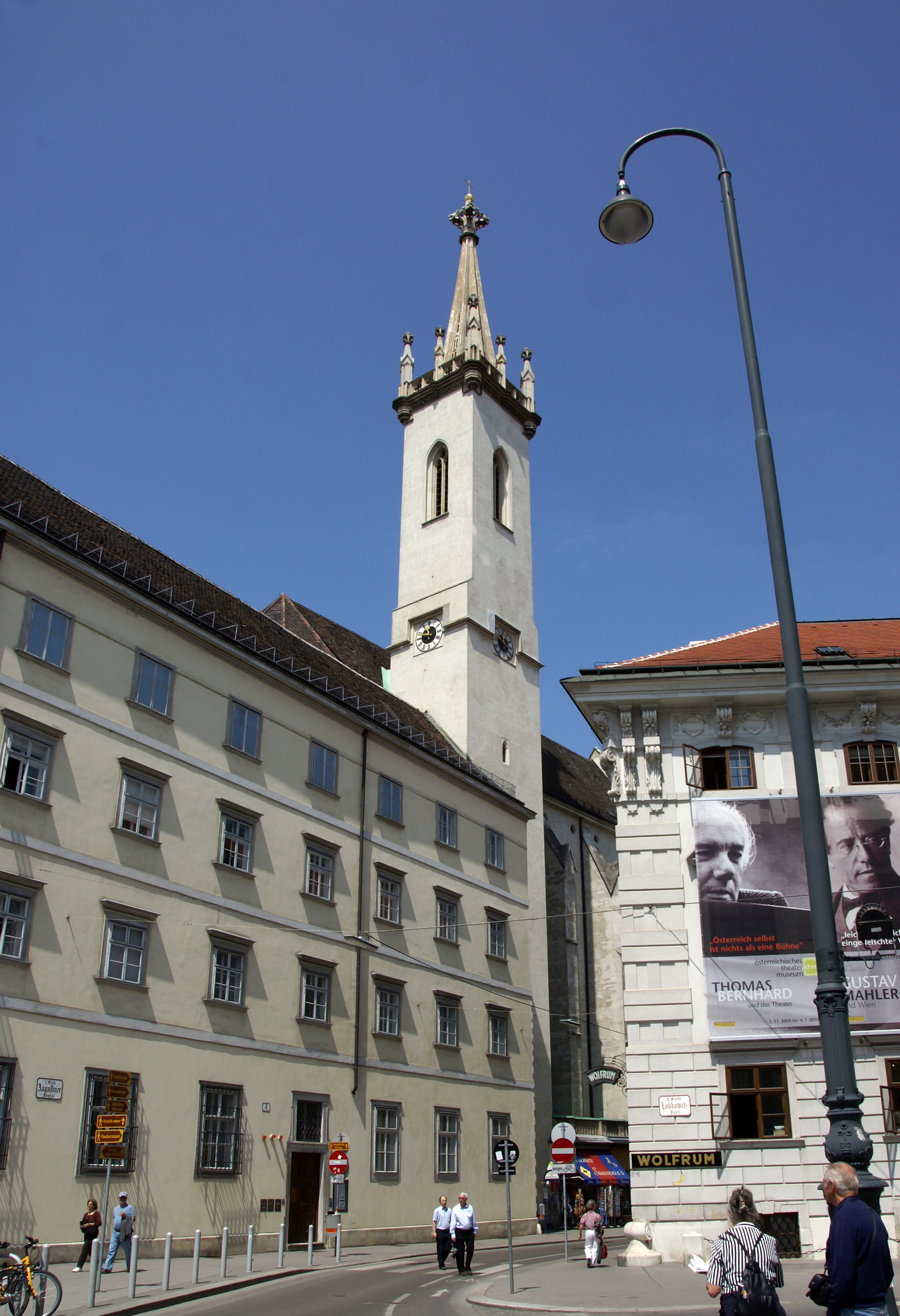

- Location within Austria

Religion
- Affiliation: Catholic Church
- Ecclesiastical or organisational status: Active
- Leadership: P. Matthias Schlögl, OSA
- Year consecrated: 1349

Location
- Location: Vienna, Austria
- State: Vienna
- Coordinates: 48.205722°N 16.367222°E

Architecture
- Architect: Dietrich Landtner
- Type: Church
- Style: Gothic, Baroque
- Groundbreaking: 1327
- Completed: 1339

Specifications
- Direction of façade: NW
- Length: 85 m (279 ft)
- Width: 20 m (66 ft)
- Width (nave): 11 m (36.1 ft)

Website
- www.augustinerkirche.at

The Augustinian Church (German: Augustinerkirche) in Vienna is a parish church located on Josefsplatz, next to the Hofburg, the winter palace of the Habsburg dynasty in Vienna. Originally built in the 14th century as the parish church of the imperial court of the Habsburgs, the harmonious Gothic interior was added in the 18th century. The official name of church and parish is St. Augustin, but it is locally called Augustinerkirche.

== History ==
In 1327, Duke Frederick the Handsome (Friedrich der Schöne) founded this church with a cloister for the Augustinian friars.

In 1634, the Augustinerkirche became the parish church of the imperial church and so many Habsburg weddings took place there, including the wedding of Archduchess (and future Empress) Maria Theresa in 1736 to Duke Francis of Lorraine, the wedding of Archduchess Marie Louise in 1810 to Emperor Napoleon Bonaparte of France, Maria Leopoldina in 1817 to Dom Pedro of Portugal and the wedding of Emperor Franz Joseph in 1854 to Duchess Elisabeth in Bavaria.

A functioning monastery of six black-robed Augustinian friars remains and serves the needs of the parish.

== Exterior ==
Solemn High Mass being celebrated in the church

The Gothic church is 85 m (278.9 ft) long and 20 m (65.6 ft) wide. The nave is 11 m (36.1 ft) wide.

== Interior ==
The nave was built under architect Dietrich Landtner from 1330 to 1339 but not consecrated until 1 November 1349. As the nearby Hofburg expanded, the Augustinerkirche gradually became engulfed by it and today is a part of the complex. Although inconspicuous from the outside, the inside is more ornate. During the reign of Emperor Joseph II, 18 side altars were removed in 1784 when the church was restored in the gothic style. A new side altar was added in 2004, dedicated to Emperor Karl I of Austria (1887–1922) who is on the path to being recognized as a saint by the Roman Catholic Church.

The pulpit was designed by Hofarchitekt Johann Ferdinand Hetzendorf von Hohenberg in 1784/85. when the church was returned to its original Gothic style. It is an early example of Gothic Revivalism in Central Europe. The white-and-gold wooden structure is placed on a column with a foliated Gothic capital. The balustrade and the rear wall is decorated with simple blind tracery. The abat-voix forms a canopy with the usual symbol of the dove and a statue of Saint Paul (?) on the top. A painting of the interior by Martin van Meytens from 1760 shows another simple, rectangular pulpit with the statue of the Madonna on the top.

=== Chapels ===
The Loreto Chapel, to the right of the main altar, holds the silver urns containing the hearts of Habsburg rulers, while their bodies are kept in the Imperial Crypt. Herzgruft contains the hearts of 54 members of the imperial family.

=== Cenotaph of Maria Christina ===
Notable among the church's monuments is the memorial to Archduchess Maria Christina of Austria sculpted by Antonio Canova, in 1805.

== Sacred music ==
Composer Franz Schubert conducted his Mass in F major there, and Anton Bruckner's Mass in F minor was written for the church and was first performed there. In the 21st century, the church is known to host high quality sacred music concerts, particularly for its weekly Sunday High mass with full orchestra and choir. The church has two organs.

== Gallery ==
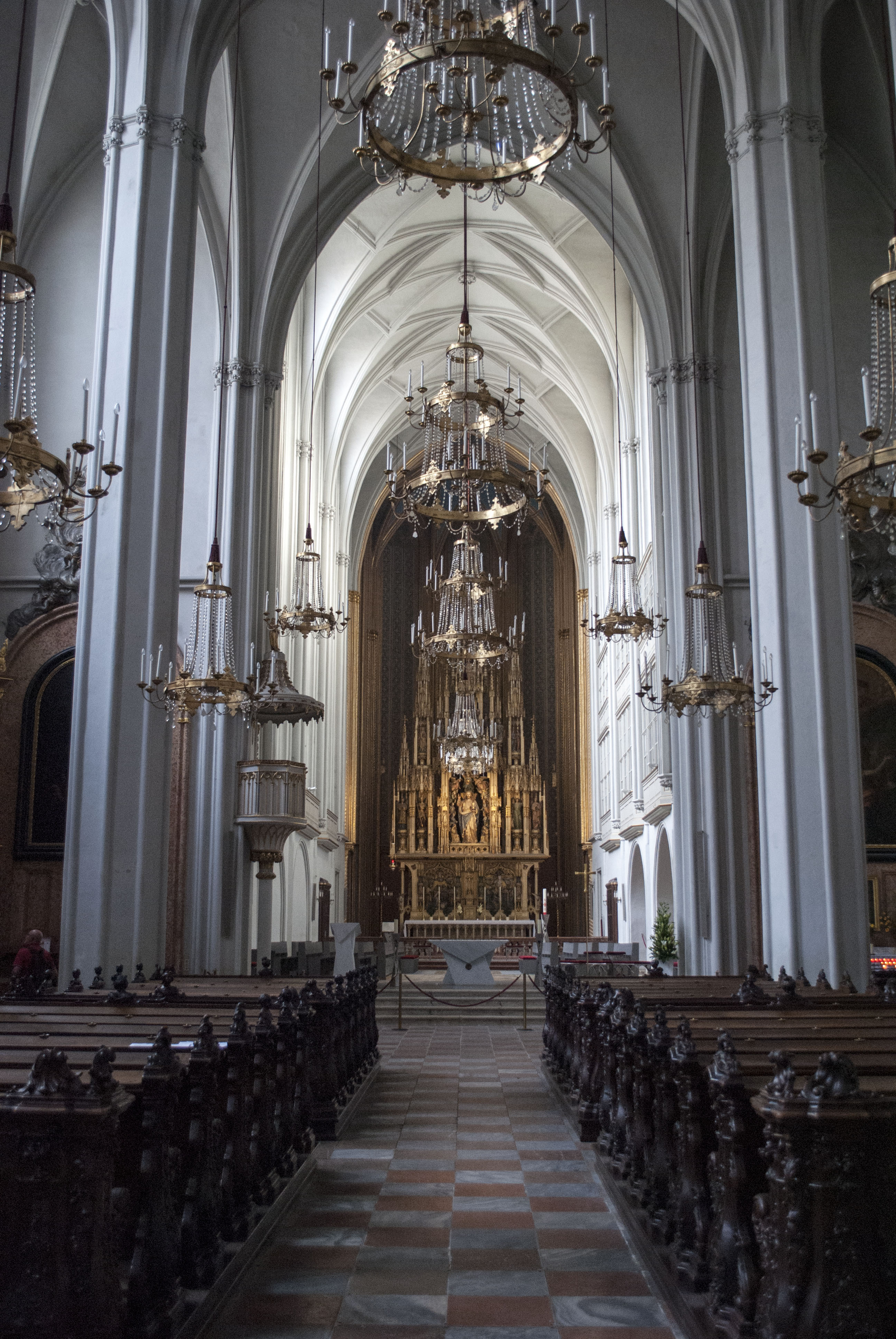
Interior

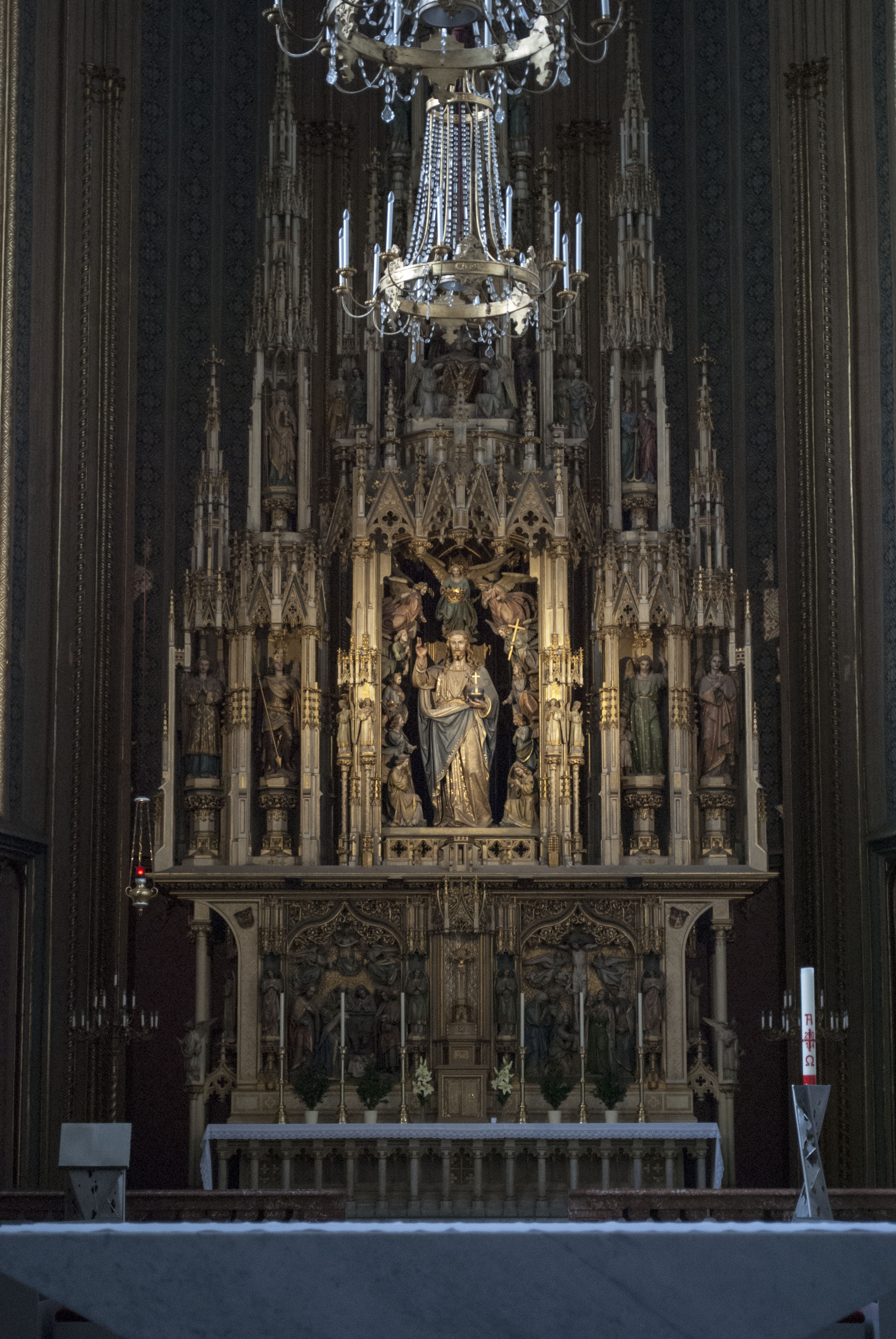
Altar

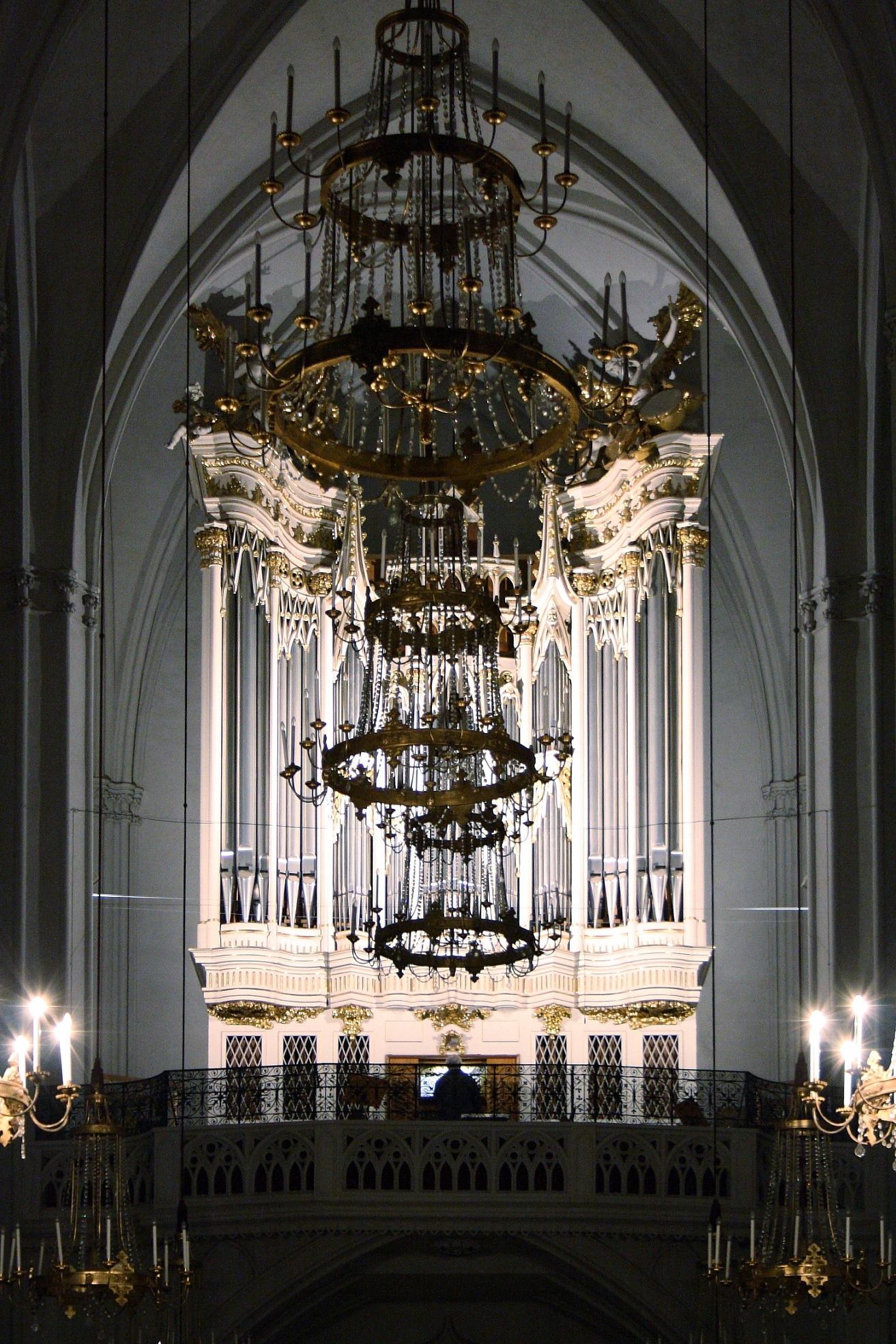
Rieger Organ

Nave with a view of the organ

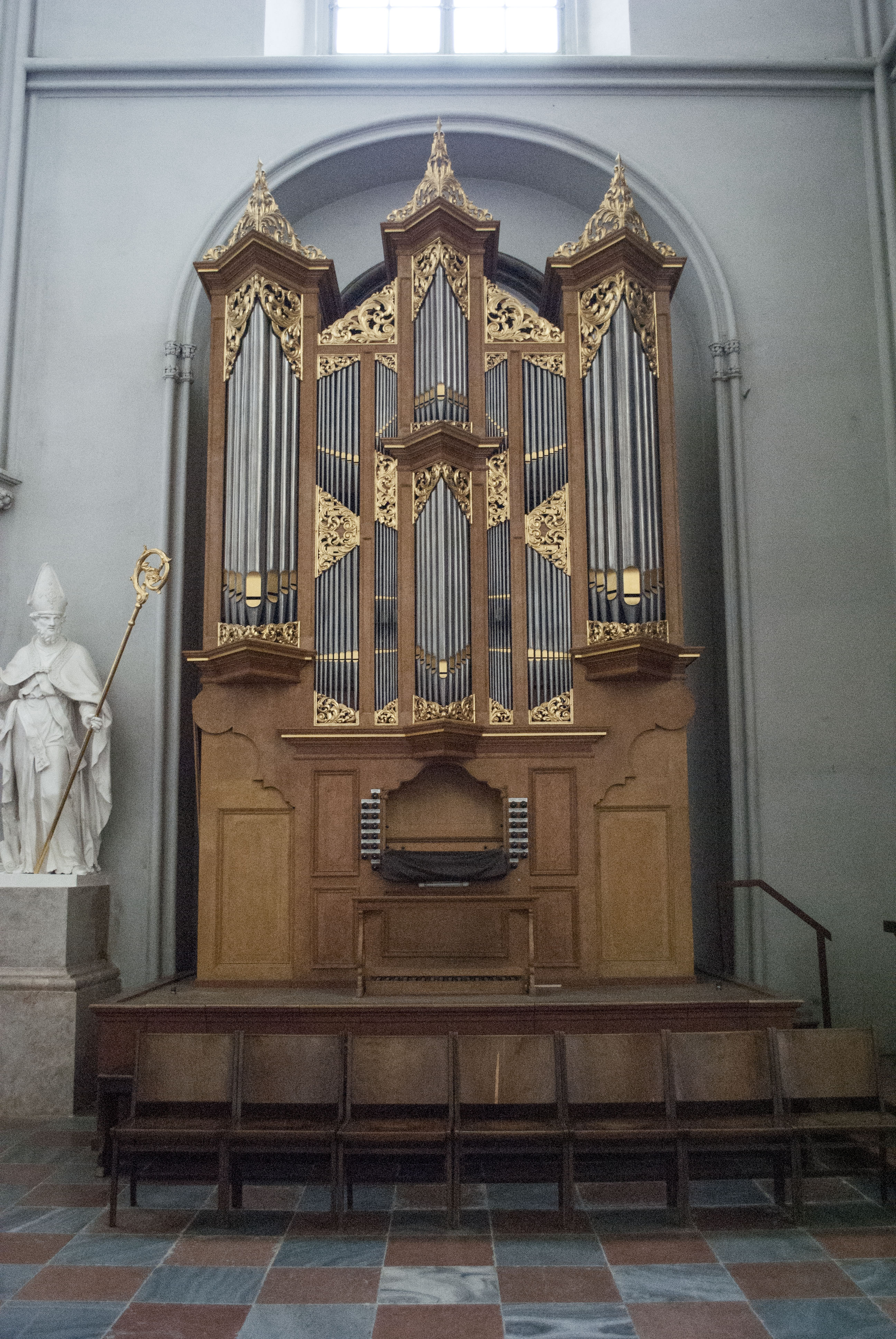
Bach Organ

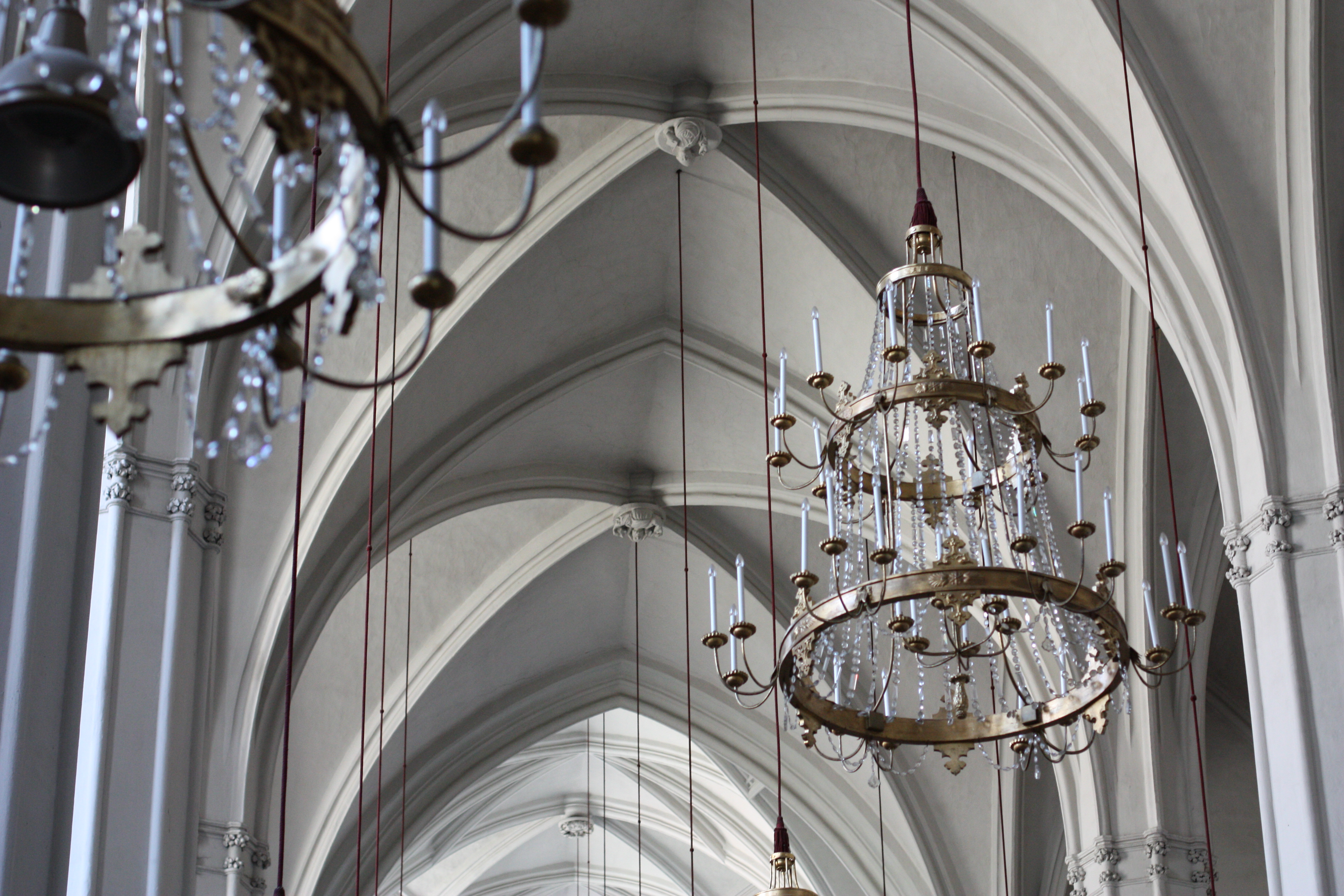
Chandeliers

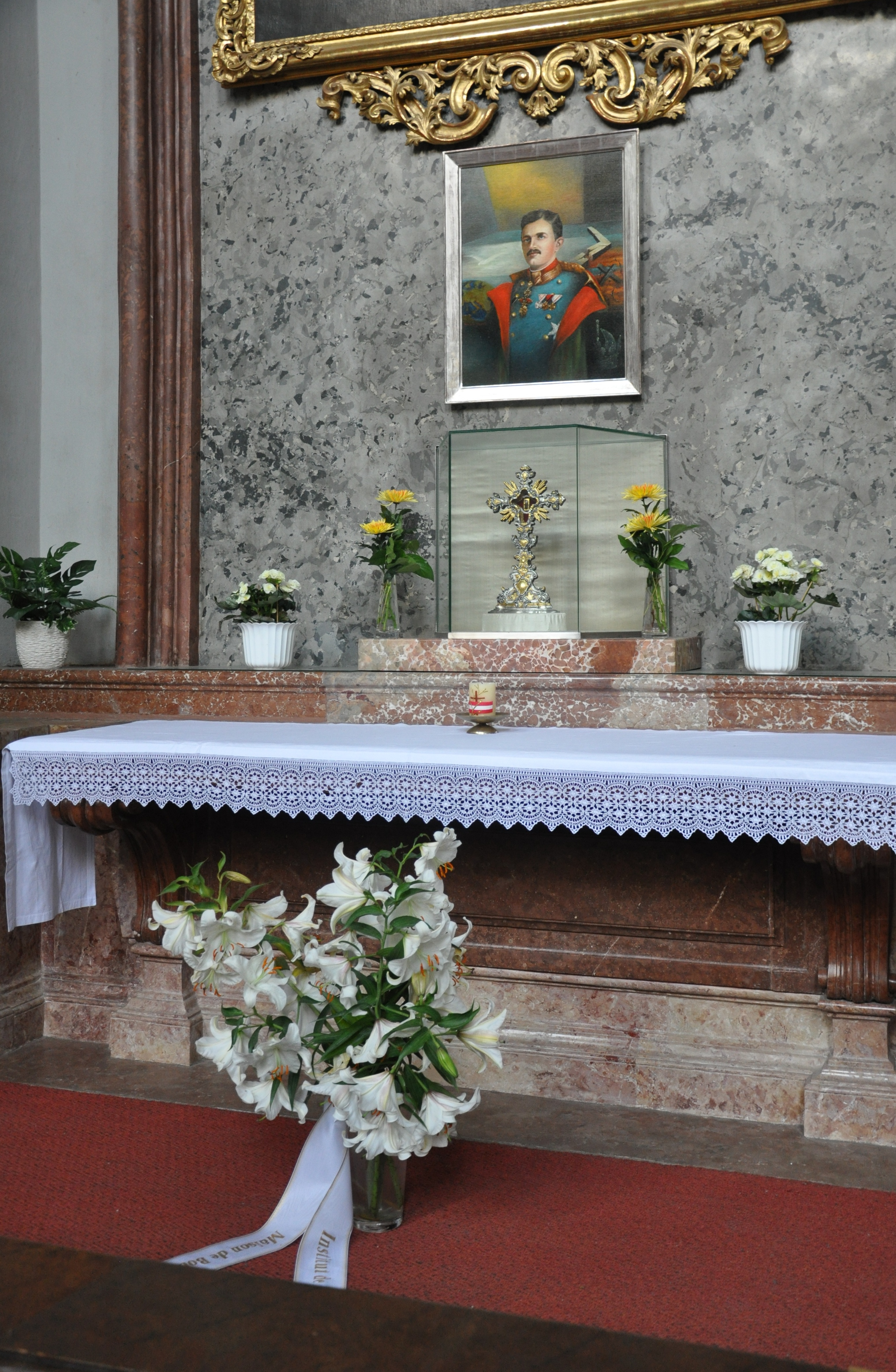
Side altar with painting of Emperor Karl I

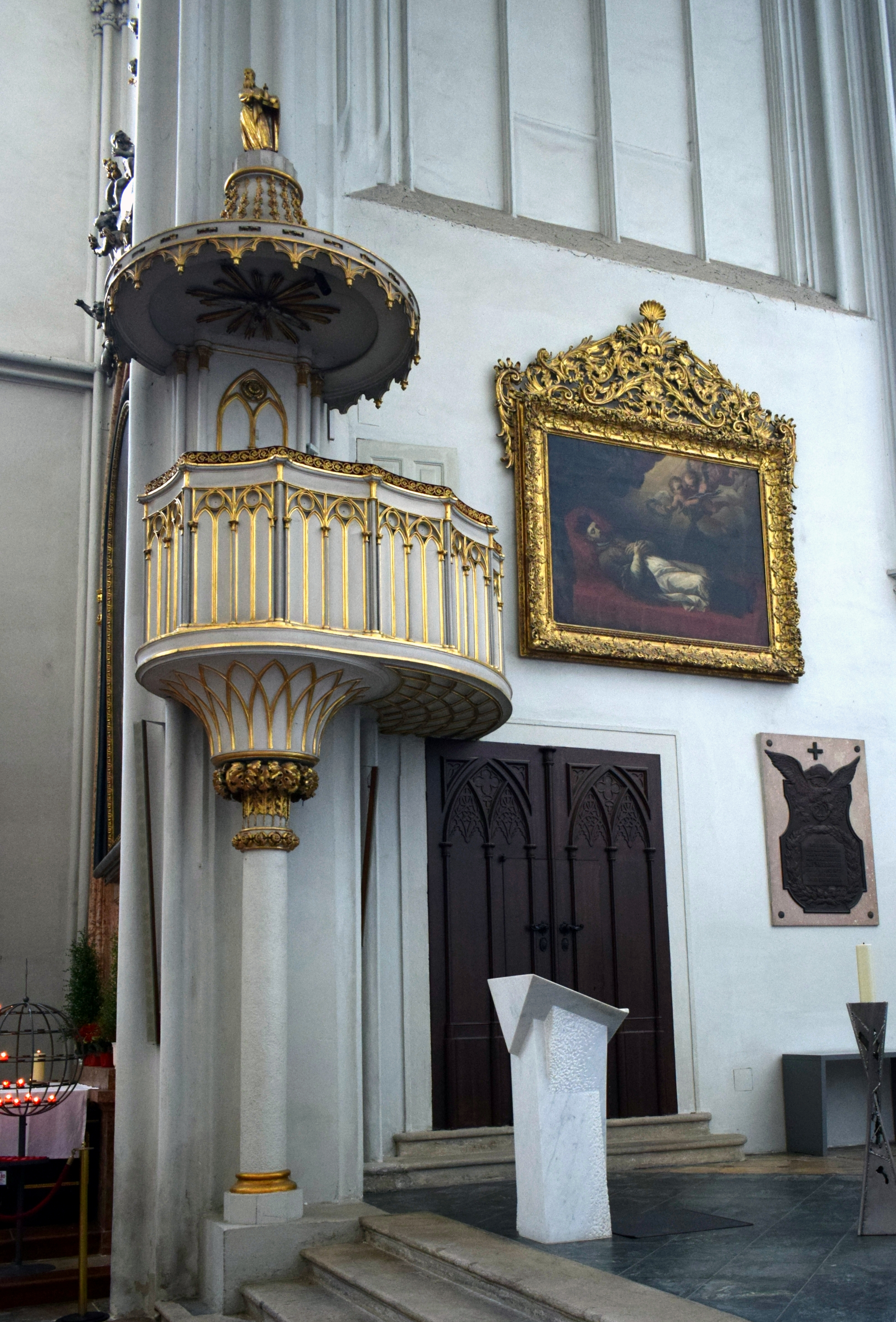
The pulpit

=== Cenotaph for Archduchess Maria Christina ===
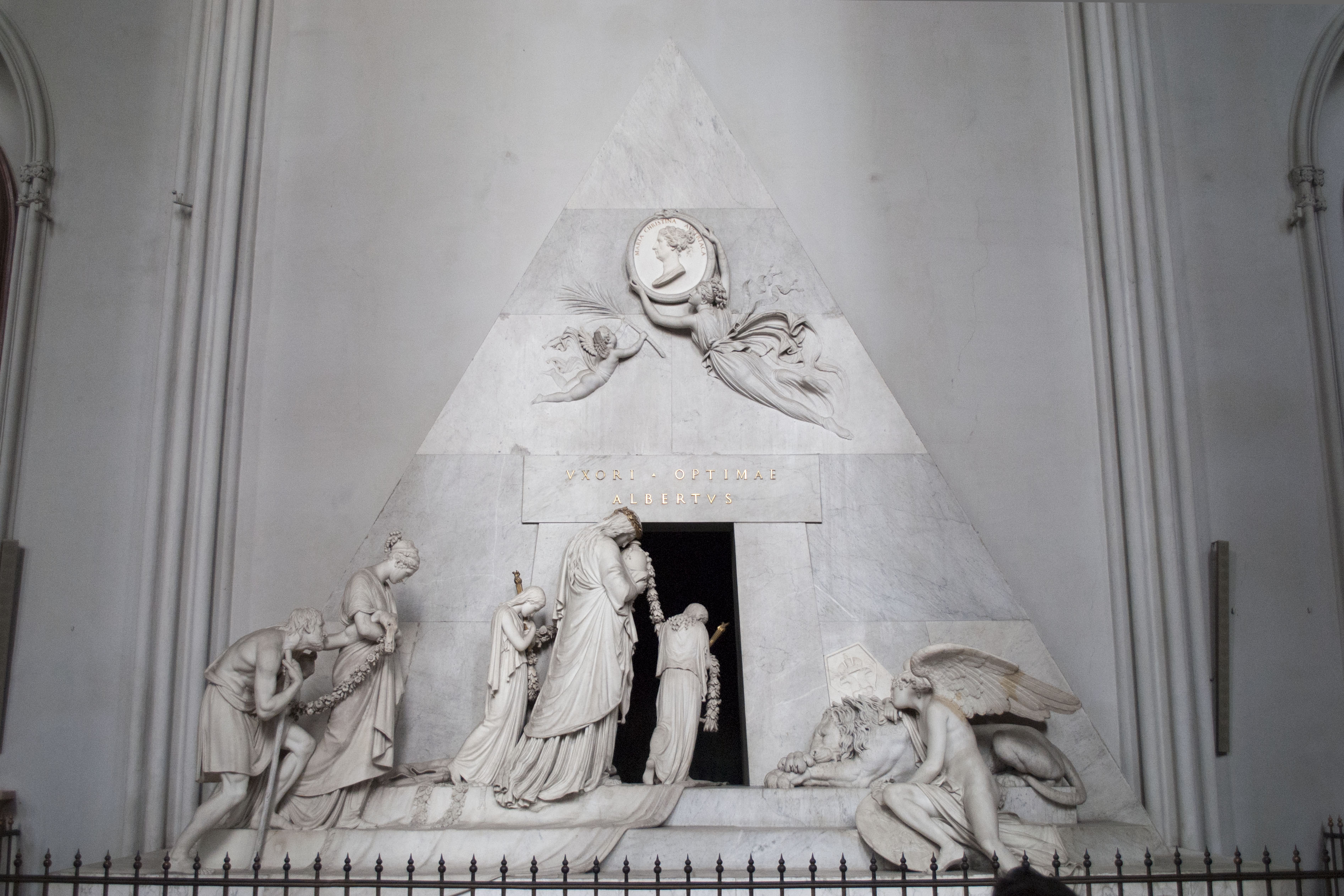

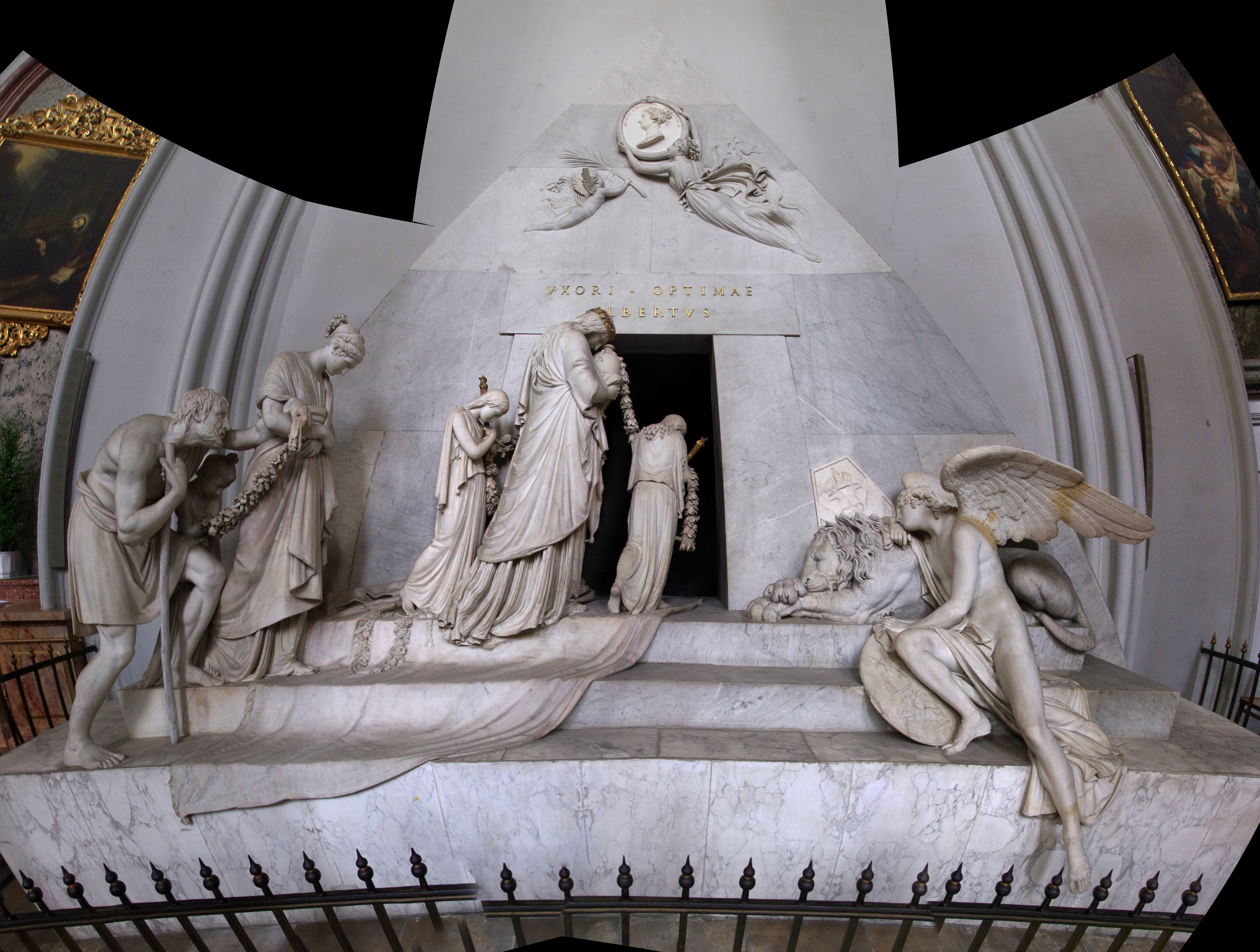

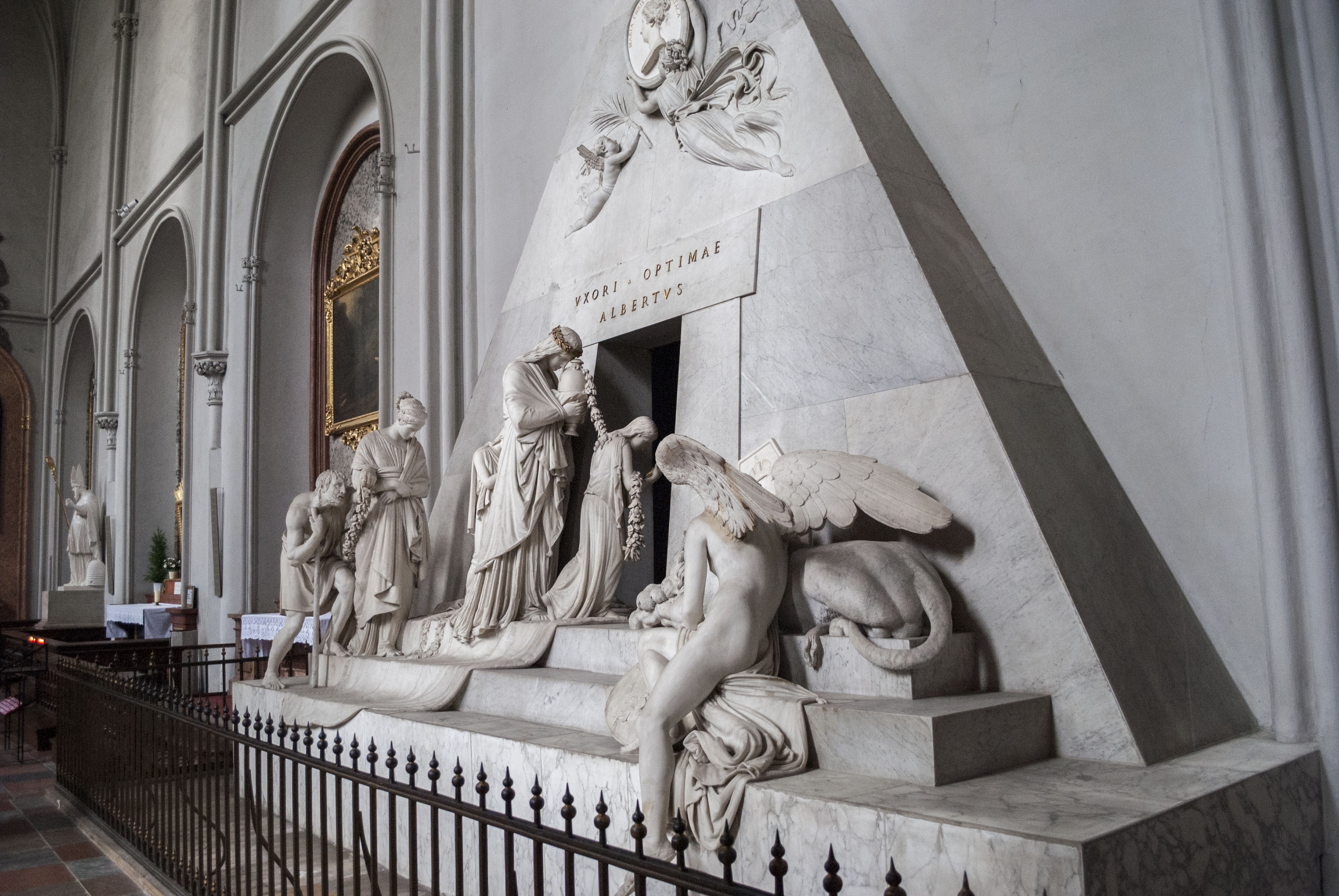

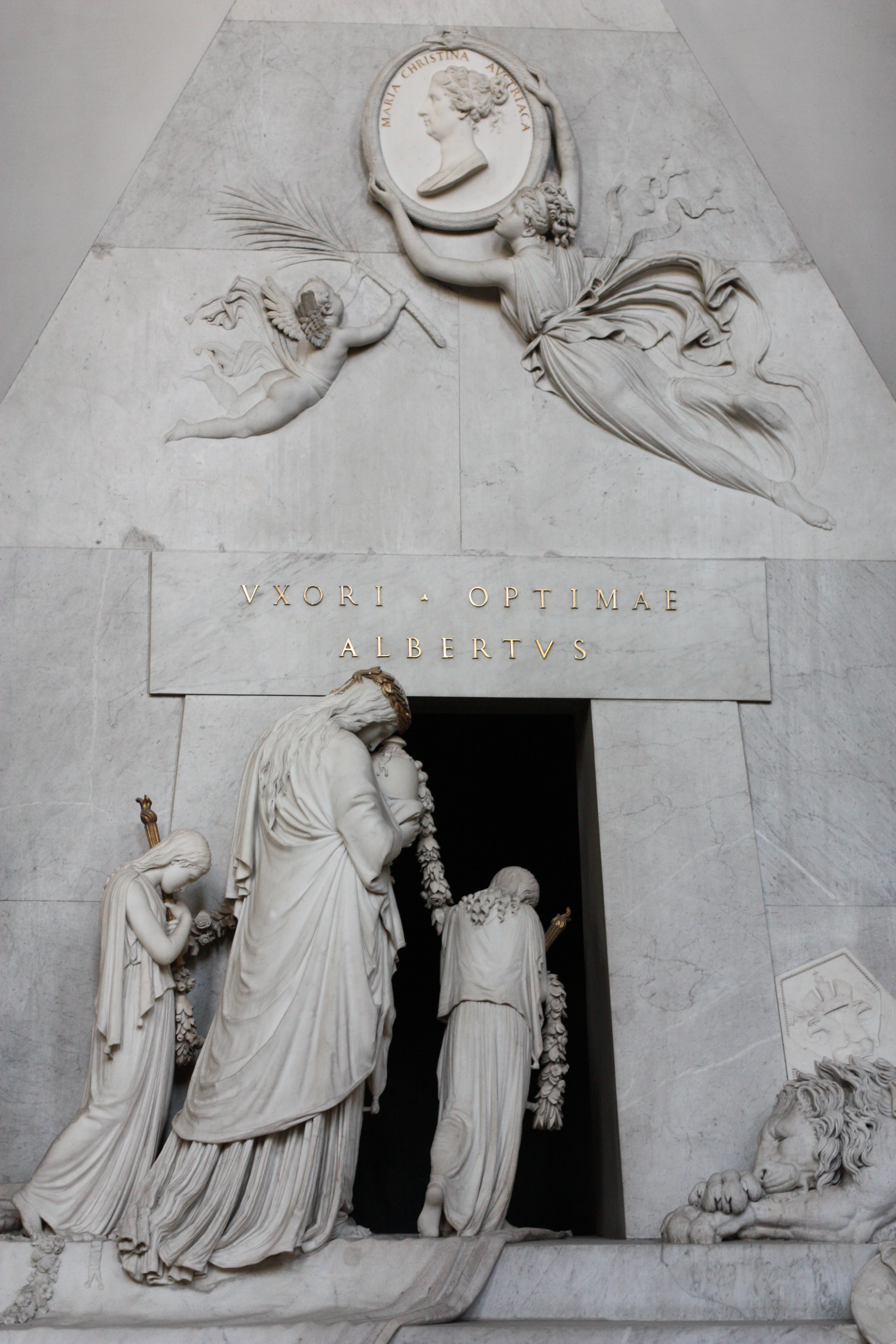

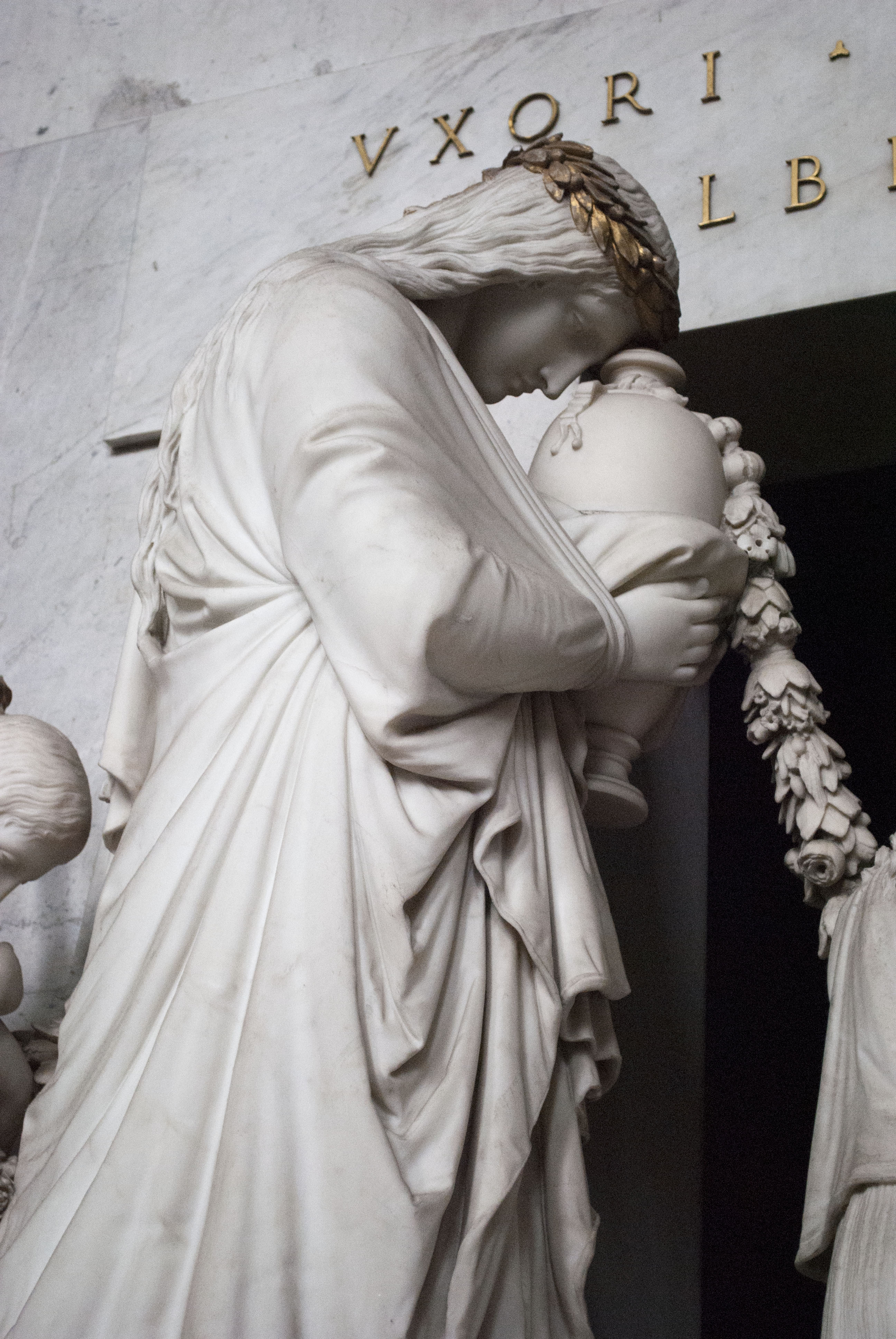

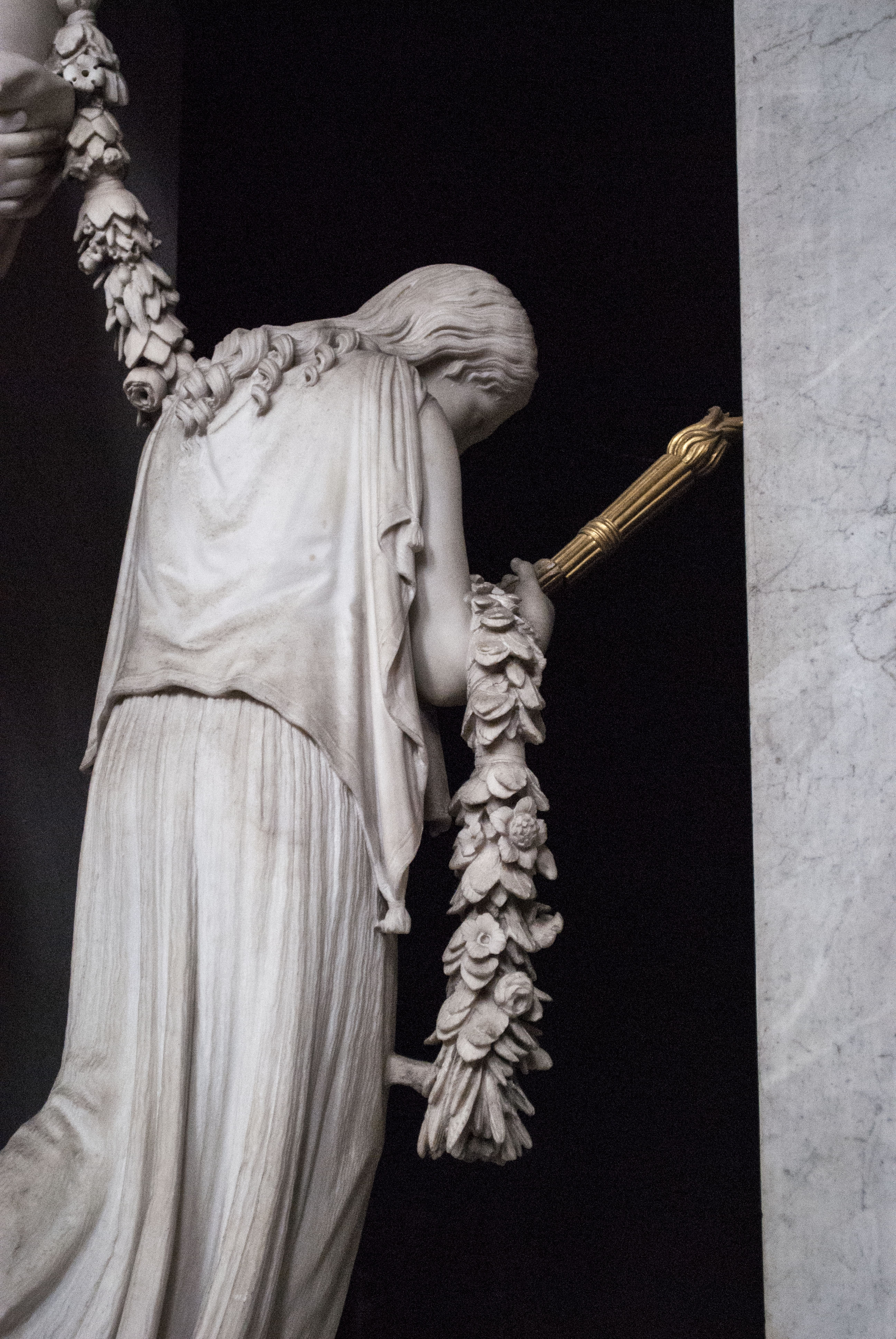

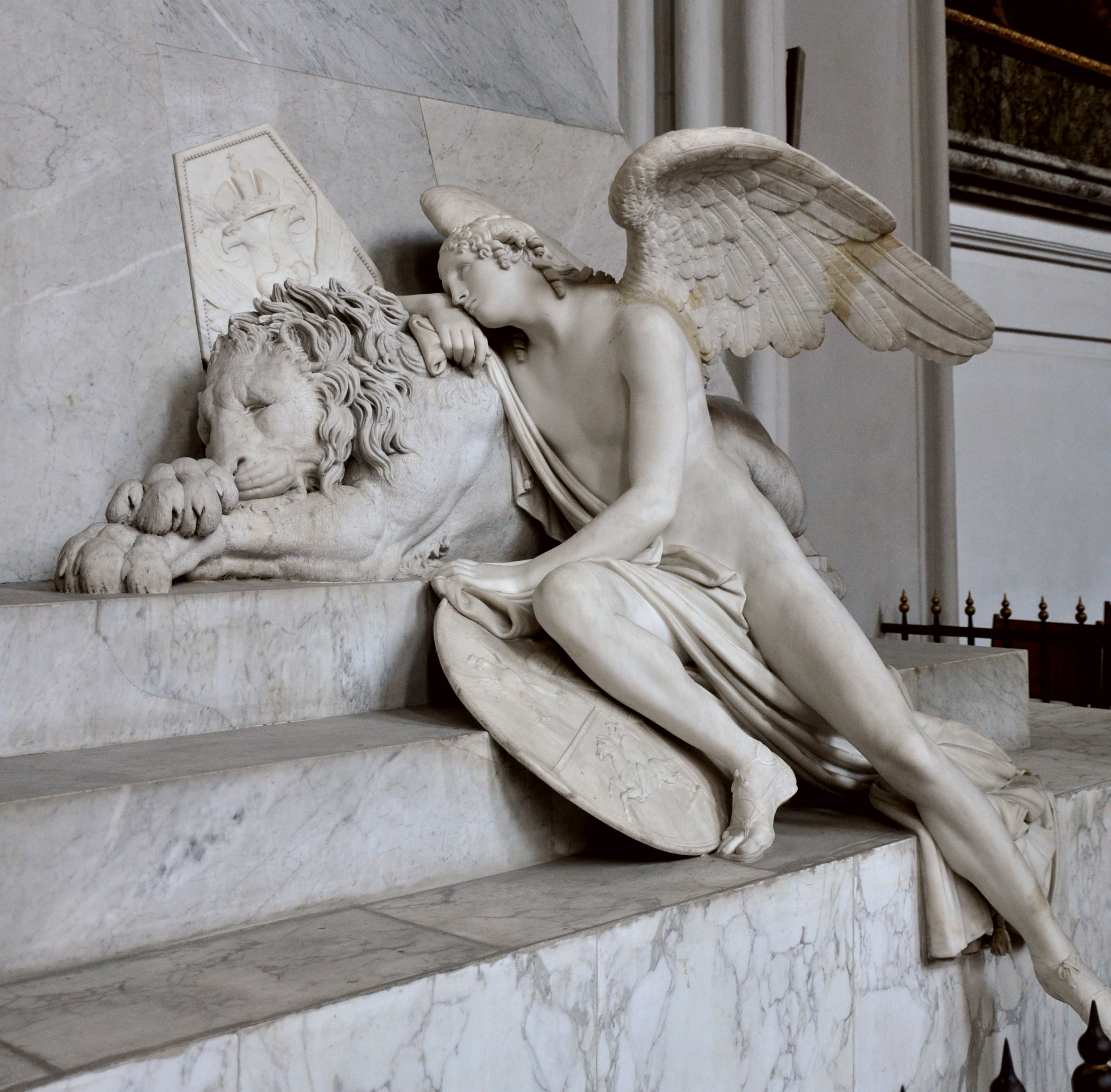
