= Mass No. 1 (Schubert) =

Liturgical work by Schubert from 1814

- by Franz Schubert
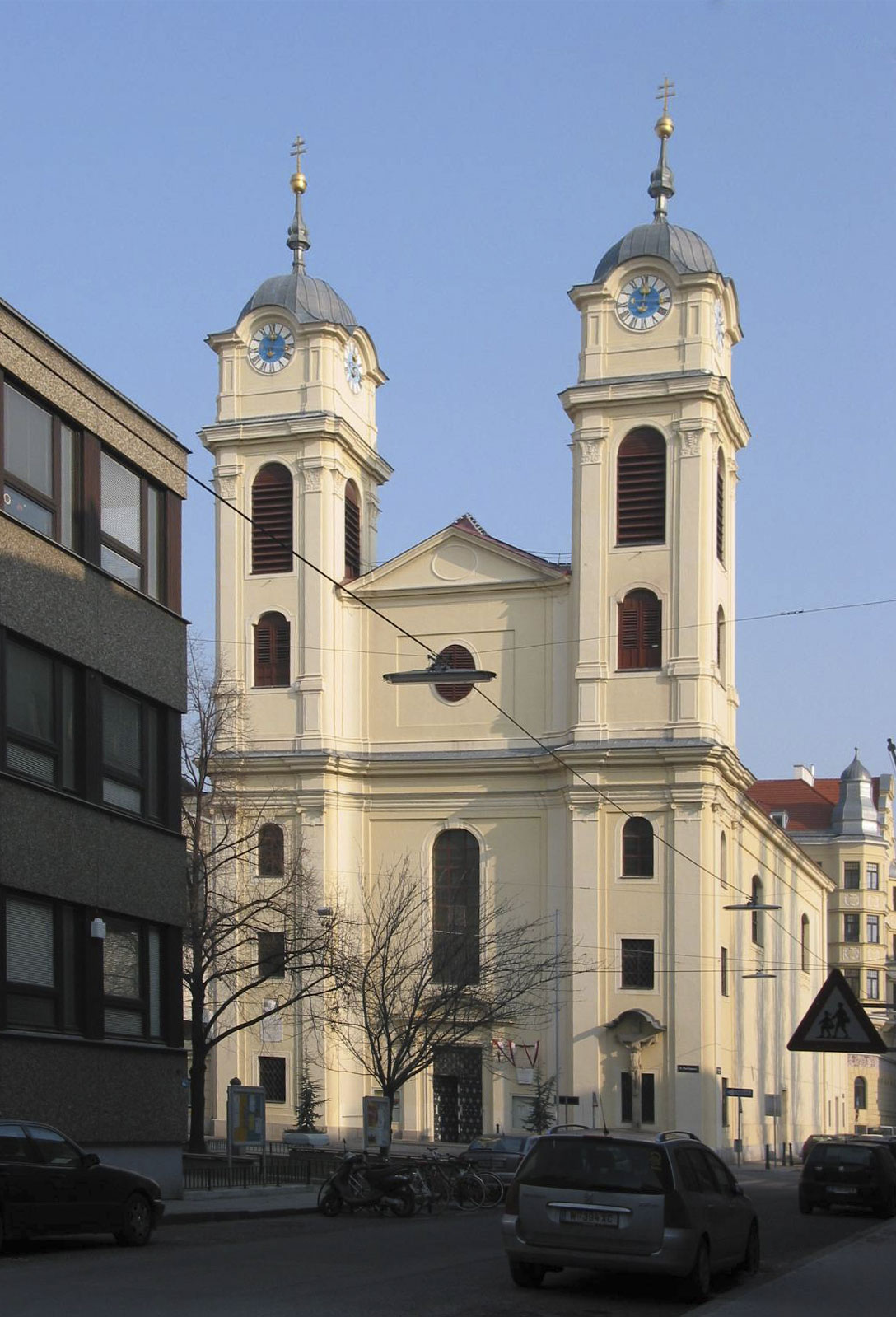
- Lichtental Parish Church. The mass was composed for the church's centennial.
- Key: F major
- Catalogue: D 105
- Form: Missa solemnis
- Composed: 1814
- Performed: 25 September 1814: Lichtental
- Movements: 6
- Vocal: SATB choir and soloists
- Instrumental: orchestra and organ

Mass No. 1 in F major, D 105, is a mass composed by Franz Schubert in 1814. It is scored for two soprano soloists, two tenor soloists, alto and bass soloists, SATB choir, oboe, clarinet, bassoon, 2 horns, violin I and II, viola, and basso continuo (cello, double bass and organ). It was the first of Schubert's masses to be performed, and is of the missa solemnis type.

== Background ==
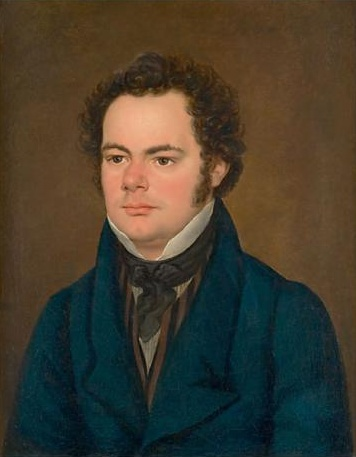
Portrait of Franz Schubert by Franz Eybl (1827)

The mass was composed for the centennial celebration of the parish church of Lichtental, now part of Vienna. The Schuberts' family church, it is also known as Schubertkirche (Schubert church). Schubert received an invitation to compose a mass for the anniversary in May 1814. The premiere was conducted on 25 September with an estimated 62 performers, a large contingent for contemporary performances. The composer's brother Ferdinand played the organ, Michael Holzer served as choirmaster, Joseph Mayseder served as concertmaster, Therese Grob sang the soprano solo, and Schubert conducted. Schubert's teacher Antonio Salieri may have attended the premiere; afterwards, he is said to have embraced his student with the words "der mir noch viele Ehre machen wird" ("You will bring me yet more honour").

Ferdinand wrote that a second performance took place ten days later at St Augustine's Court Church, before a prestigious audience that may have included foreign dignitaries.

Schubert's love for Therese Grob may have been kindled during the writing of this mass. The prominent first soprano solo, with its high tessitura, was designed to showcase her voice.

Schubert composed an alternative Dona nobis pacem (formerly D 185) in April 1815. This may have been composed for a service during the public outcry over Napoleon's escape from Elba; alternatively, it may have been for a second performance of the mass at the Lichtental church on Trinity Sunday. It replaces a shorter, less fugal section in the 1814 version.

== Structure ==
The piece is divided into six movements. Performances require approximately 40 minutes. Notes are based on Schubert's 1815 revision.

1. "Kyrie" Larghetto, F major, 6/8
2. "Gloria" Allegro vivace, C major, cut common time
  "Gratias agimus tibi..." Andante con moto, F major, 3/4; STB soloists
  "Domine Deus, Rex coelestis..." choir
  "Domine Deus, Agnus Dei..." Adagio, D minor, common time; SATB soloists and choir
  "Quoniam tu solus sanctus..." Allegro, C major, common time
  "Cum sancto spiritu..." Allegro vivace, C major, cut common time
3. "Credo" Andantino, F major, 3/4
4. "Sanctus" Adagio maestoso, F major, common time
5. "Benedictus" Andante con moto, B-flat major, 3/4; soprano and tenor quartette
6. "Agnus Dei" Adagio molto, F minor, common time
  "Dona nobis pacem..." Allegro molto, F major, 6/8
