= Ferdinand Schubert =

Austrian composer (1794–1859)

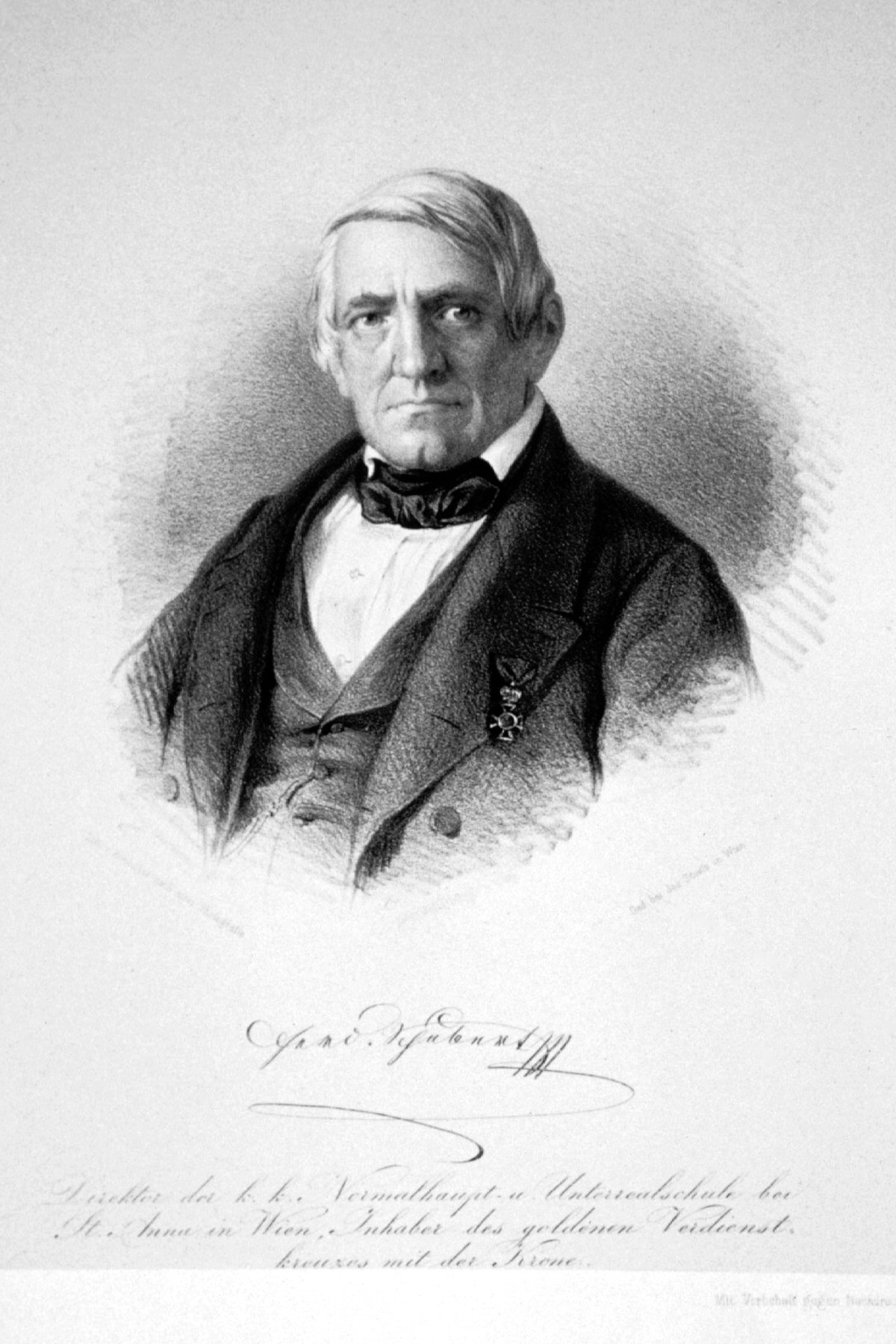
Ferdinand Schubert, Lithograph by Josef Kriehuber in 1850

Ferdinand Schubert (born 18 October 1794 in Vienna; died 26 February 1859) was an Austrian composer and brother of Franz Schubert. He also designed the grave stone for the grave of Ludwig van Beethoven, which is now at Vienna's Central Cemetery.

== Early life ==
Ferdinand Lukas Schubert was an Austrian teacher, organist and composer. He is notable for his compositions and for his role in publishing the complete works of his younger brother Franz Schubert. He received training in piano and violin from his father, Franz Theodor Schubert, and his older brother Ignaz, later from Michael Holzer, and finally from the public teacher of the choir of St. Anna, Joseph Drechsler. As a boy, Ferdinand played violin in the Schubert family string quartet, with his brothers Franz and Ignaz on viola and violin and his father on cello. Franz Schubert composed many of his early string quartets for this ensemble.

== Career ==
In 1810, Schubert became organist at the Lichtentaler Parish and was also assistant teacher at an orphanage in Vienna. Four years later, in 1816, he was promoted to full-time teacher at the orphanage. In that year, Schubert married one of his students, Anna. In 1818, Franz Schubert composed the German Requiem D621 for Ferdinand, which Ferdinand would later publish and for which he would take credit as his own composition.

In 1820, Schubert became a teacher and choirmaster in Altlerchenfeld. In 1824, he received an appointment as teacher at the Normal-Hauptschule at St. Anna. After his first wife had died, Ferdinand married his second wife, Therese, in 1832. His two marriages produced a total of 29 children, of whom 12 survived to adulthood. In 1838, he became an honorary professor of organ at the Conservatory. Since he was admired in professional circles for his outstanding work as a school administrator, he received the post of director of the normal primary school at St. Anna in 1851.

Ferdinand kept a considerable part of the musical estate of Franz Schubert. With the exception of certain operas, masses, and symphonies, he sold the bulk of Franz Schubert's compositions to Anton Diabelli after Franz's death in 1828. Diabelli's firm published the catalog over the course of the next 30 years, even after Diabelli's death.

Ferdinand also wrote numerous educational journals and a number of sacred compositions and smaller pieces for school use. Although he worked hard all his life, his family lived in poor economic conditions. As such, his will called for any work published after his death to be for the support of his dependents.

== Musical works ==
- Requiem, op. 9 (after Franz Schubert's death)
- Hirtenmesse, op. 13
- Salve Regina, op. 12
- Messe F-Dur (1830), op. 10
- Filiae Regum
- Regina Coeli
