= Therese Grob =

Austrian singer (1798–1875)

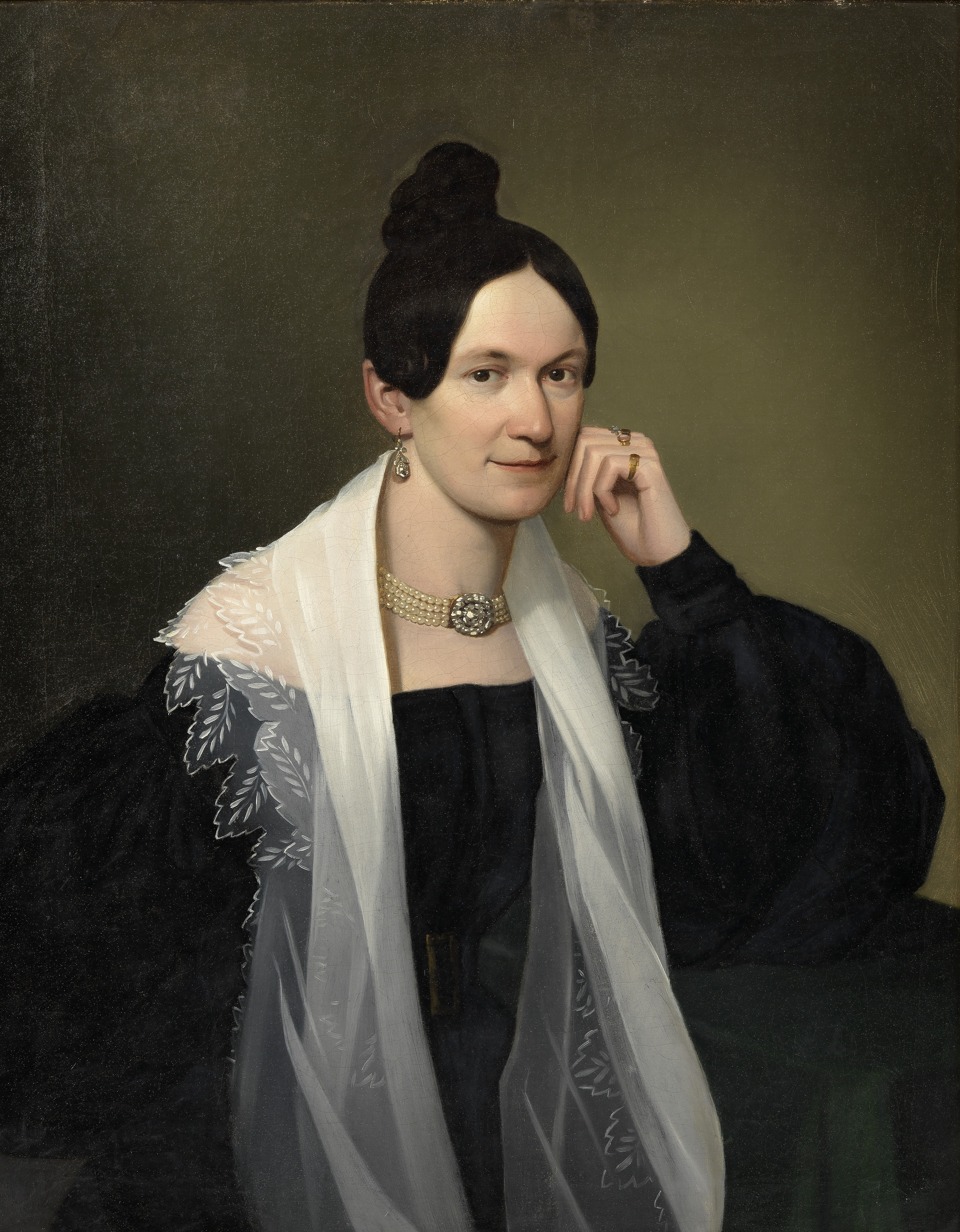
Therese Grob (around 1835), oil painting by Heinrich Hollpein

Therese Grob (16 November 1798 – 17 March 1875) was an Austrian singer and friend of the composer Franz Schubert in his teenage years. He wrote many songs for her. Later in life, he declared that he had wanted to marry her.

Therese was the daughter of Heinrich Grob and Theresia Männer. She was born in Lichtental, Vienna. There was one other child, a boy called Heinrich (1800–1855) who was two years younger than Therese. Her father died on 6 April 1804. The widowed mother continued to run the small silk-weaving business that Heinrich Senior had established. The premises were very near to Schubert's home. Therese had an attractive soprano voice, and the young Heinrich was a talented pianist and violinist. The two families grew close through music-making.

Therese sang in the Lichtental parish church, which Schubert had attended since he was a child. For the church's centenary celebrations, the young Schubert completed his first mass in late July 1814 – the Mass in F, D.105 – and Therese sang the soprano solo at the premiere performance, which conducted by Schubert himself. Schubert assembled an album of songs for Therese's brother Heinrich, the last of which is dated 1816.

Not a single love letter from Schubert to Grob is known to exist. What little is known about his relationship with her is mostly conjecture. Although friends of Schubert have reported secret love stories many years after his death, Schubert's relationship with Grob is likely to have been purely platonic.

The composer's friend Anselm Hüttenbrenner recalled – twenty-six years after Schubert's death:

From the time I met Schubert, he did not have the least affair of the heart. He was a dry patron towards the fair sex, therefore nothing less than gallant. ... However, according to his statement, before he met me he had his eye on a teacher's daughter from the countryside, who was also said to be fond of him. She won his heart by singing a soprano solo from a mass by Schubert so well. What her father's name was and where he lived has slipped my mind. – The girl could not marry Schubert because he was too young at the time, without money or employment. She is said to have yielded to her father's will against her inclination and married another man who could provide for her. He had a prevailing antipathy to the daughters of Eve from that time, when he saw his sweetheart lost forever.

On 21 November 1820, Therese married Johann Bergmann (24 June 1797 – 1840), a baker. Together they had four children: Theresia (1821–1894), Johann Baptist (1822–1875), Amalia (9 July 1824 – 24 December 1886) and Carolina (born 1828). Schubert himself never married. Eight years after the composer's death, on 14 September 1836, Schubert's brother Ignaz married Therese's aunt Wilhelmine.
