= Martin Reimann =

American psychologist and marketing researcher

Martin Reimann is a psychologist and marketing researcher. He is an associate professor of marketing at the Eller College of Management at the University of Arizona.

== Research ==
Reimann's research focuses on consumer psychology, especially the role of positive and negative affect in consumption, and is aimed at identifying an overarching framework for how consumers utilize emotional information to arrive at decisions. Specifically, he is interested in reward and reinforcement, food consumption, and relationship management. Reimann's research also deals with accuracy of survey responses and the triangulation of different data forms.

== Service ==
Reimann helped found (with Oliver Schilke) the Journal of Neuroscience, Psychology, and Economics, an official journal of the American Psychological Association.

== Selected publications ==
- Reimann, Martin, Judith Zaichkowsky, Carolin Neuhaus, Thomas Bender, and Bernd Weber. "Aesthetic package design: A behavioral, neural, and psychological investigation." Journal of consumer psychology 20, no. 4 (2010): 431–441.
- Reimann, M., Schilke, O. and Thomas, J.S., 2010. Customer relationship management and firm performance: the mediating role of business strategy. Journal of the academy of marketing science, 38(3), pp. 326–346.
- Homburg, C., Klarmann, M., Reimann, M. and Schilke, O., 2012. What drives key informant accuracy?. Journal of Marketing Research, 49(4), pp. 594–608.
- Reimann, M., Castaño, R., Zaichkowsky, J. and Bechara, A., 2012. How we relate to brands: Psychological and neurophysiological insights into consumer–brand relationships. Journal of Consumer Psychology, 22(1), pp. 128–142.
- Reimann, M., Lünemann, U.F. and Chase, R.B., 2008. Uncertainty avoidance as a moderator of the relationship between perceived service quality and customer satisfaction. Journal of Service Research, 11(1), pp. 63–73.
