= Lichtental =

Coordinates: 48°13′41″N 16°21′28″E

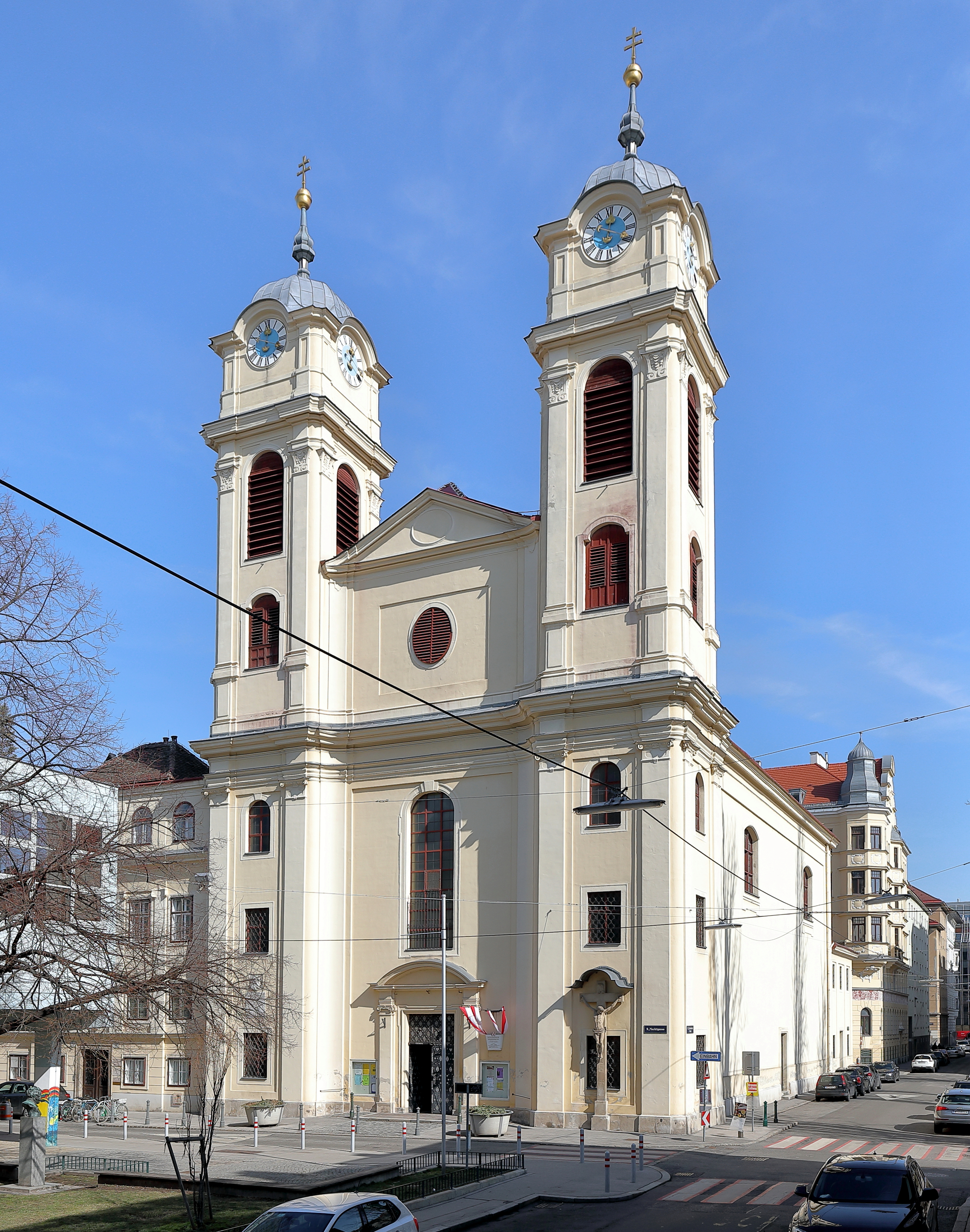
- Lichtental Church of the Fourteen Holy Helpers
- Interactive map of Lichtental

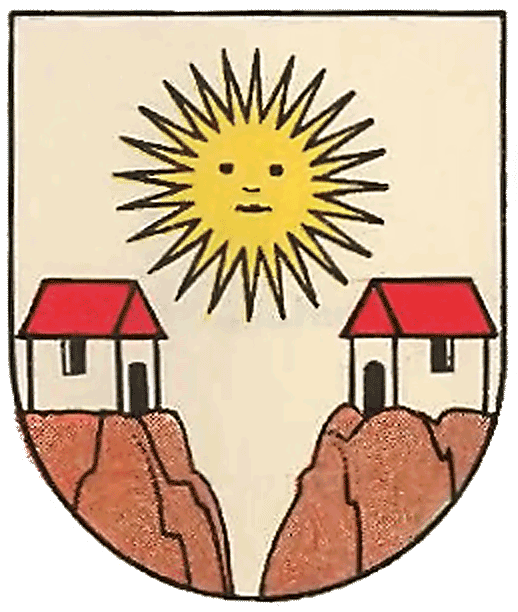
Coat of Arms of Lichtental

Lichtental is a part of the district of Alsergrund, Vienna.

It was an independent municipality until 1850.

== Notable people ==
- Hans-Adam I, Prince of Liechtenstein (1657–1712) lived here.
- Caterina Cavalieri (1755–1801), opera singer, was born here.
- Therese Grob (1798–1875), the first love of the composer Franz Schubert, was born here.
- Anton von Schmerling (1805–1893), Austrian politician, was born here.
- Georg Herwegh (1817–1875), German writer, died here.

Media related to Lichtental (Vienna) at Wikimedia Commons
