= Mass No. 2 (Schubert) =

1815 composition by Franz Schubert

- by Franz Schubert
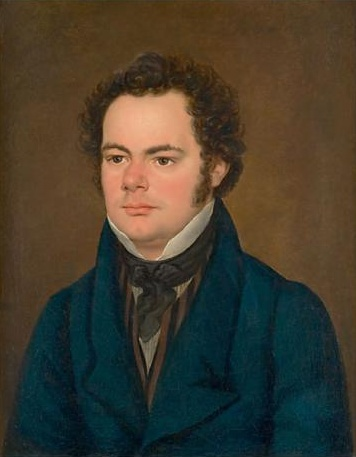
- Portrait of Franz Schubert by Franz Eybl (1827)
- Key: G major
- Catalogue: D 167
- Form: Missa brevis
- Composed: 1815
- Movements: 6
- Vocal: STB soloists; SATB choir
- Instrumental: string orchestra and organ

Mass No. 2 in G major, D 167, by Franz Schubert was composed in less than a week in early March 1815 and remains the best known of his three short settings, or missae breves, dating between his more elaborate No. 1 and No. 5. Apart from some passages for soprano, its solistic interventions are modest; Schubert, characteristically, inclines toward a devotional mood. The First Mass had been successfully performed in the composer's parish the year before.

== Scoring and editions ==
The Second was originally modestly scored, requiring only a string orchestra and organ in addition to the soprano, tenor and bass soloists and the choir. It was not printed until 1845, 17 years after Schubert's death, and until then remained one of his less-noted compositions (so much so that that first edition was usurped by one by Robert Führer, director of music at Prague's St. Vitus Cathedral, a man who eventually landed in prison for embezzlement). But a 1980s discovery at Klosterneuburg of a set of parts dated later than Schubert's full score suggests that his final thoughts about the work were on a grander scale, with trumpet and timpani parts added and minor changes throughout. (The discovery led to recordings of the work by Sony Classical and Carus Classics, in 1995 and 1996 respectively, and to Carus-Verlag's publishing of the enhanced score.) Separately, Schubert's brother Ferdinand wrote parts for woodwinds, brass and timpani in response to the work's popularity.

== Structure ==
A 2000 performance by the MIT Concert Choir, directed by William Cutter.
I. Kyrie

II. Gloria

III. Credo

IV. Sanctus

VI. Benedictus

VIII. Agnus Dei

The mass consists of six movements. Performances require approximately 22 minutes.

1. Kyrie. Andante con moto, G major, 3/4
2. Gloria. Allegro maestoso, D major, common time
3. Credo. Allegro moderato, G major, cut common time
4. Sanctus. Adagio moderato, D major, common time
5. Osanna in excelsis. Allegro, 2/4
6. Benedictus. Andante grazioso, G major, 6/8; soprano, tenor and bass soloists in canon
7. Osanna in excelsis. Allegro, D major, 2/4
8. Agnus Dei. Lento, G major, common time

== Recordings ==
- 1981 - Lucia Popp (sop.), Adolf Dallapozza (ten.), Dietrich Fischer-Dieskau (bass), Chor des Bayerischen Rundfunks, Symphonie-Orchester des Bayerischen Rundfunks, Wolfgang Sawallisch - Warner Classics 7474072
- 1982 - Jocelyne Chamonin (sop.), Anthony Rolfe Johnson (ten.), Martin Egel (baritone), Nouvel Orchestre Philharmonique de Radio France, Choeurs de Radio France, Theodor Guschlbauer (conductor) - Erato STU 71442
- 1989 — Dawn Upshaw (sop.), David Gordan (ten.), William Stone (bass), Atlanta Symphony Chamber Chorus, Atlanta Symphony Orchestra, no organ, Robert Shaw — Telarc 80212
- live in 1990 — Barbara Bonney (sop.), Jorge Pita (ten.), Andreas Schmidt (bass), Wiener Staatsopernchor, Chamber Orchestra of Europe, Katrine Bryndorf (organ), Claudio Abbado — Deutsche Grammophon 435 486-2
- Sept. 20-27, 1995 — Thomas Puchegger (boy sop.), Jörg Hering (ten.), Harry van der Kamp (bass), Wiener Sängerknaben, Chorus Viennensis, Orchestra of the Age of Enlightenment, Arno Hartmann (organ), Bruno Weil — Sony Classical SK 68247
- April 1996 — Edith Lienbacher (sop.), Alexander Kaimbacher (ten.), Anton Scharinger (bass), Wiener Kammerchor, Orpheus Orchester Wien, Martin Nowak (organ), Johannes Prinz — Carus Classics 83.317
- live on Dec. 23, 2000 — Tatiana Lisnic (sop.), Cesare Catani (ten.), Ildebrando d’Arcangelo (bass), Coro del Teatro alla Scala, Orchestra del Teatro alla Scala, organist unknown, Riccardo Muti — RAI-TV, no catalog number
- live on March 29, 2007 — Luba Orgonášová (sop.), Christian Elsner (ten.), Gustáv Beláček (bass), Chor des Bayerischen Rundfunks, Symphonie-Orchester des Bayerischen Rundfunks, organist unknown, Mariss Jansons — BR Klassik 900114
