= Johann Kaspar Schiller =

German army officer (1723 - 1796)

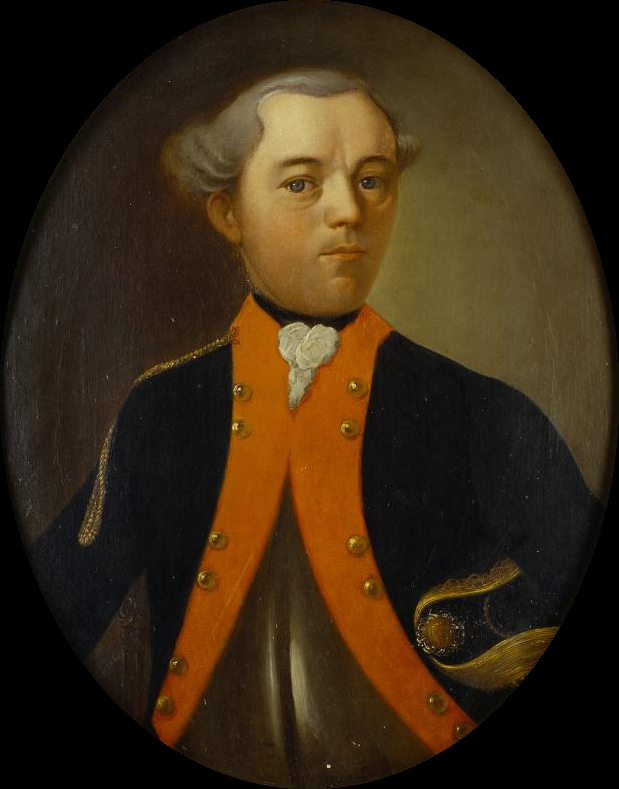
Johann Kaspar Schiller as a lieutenant

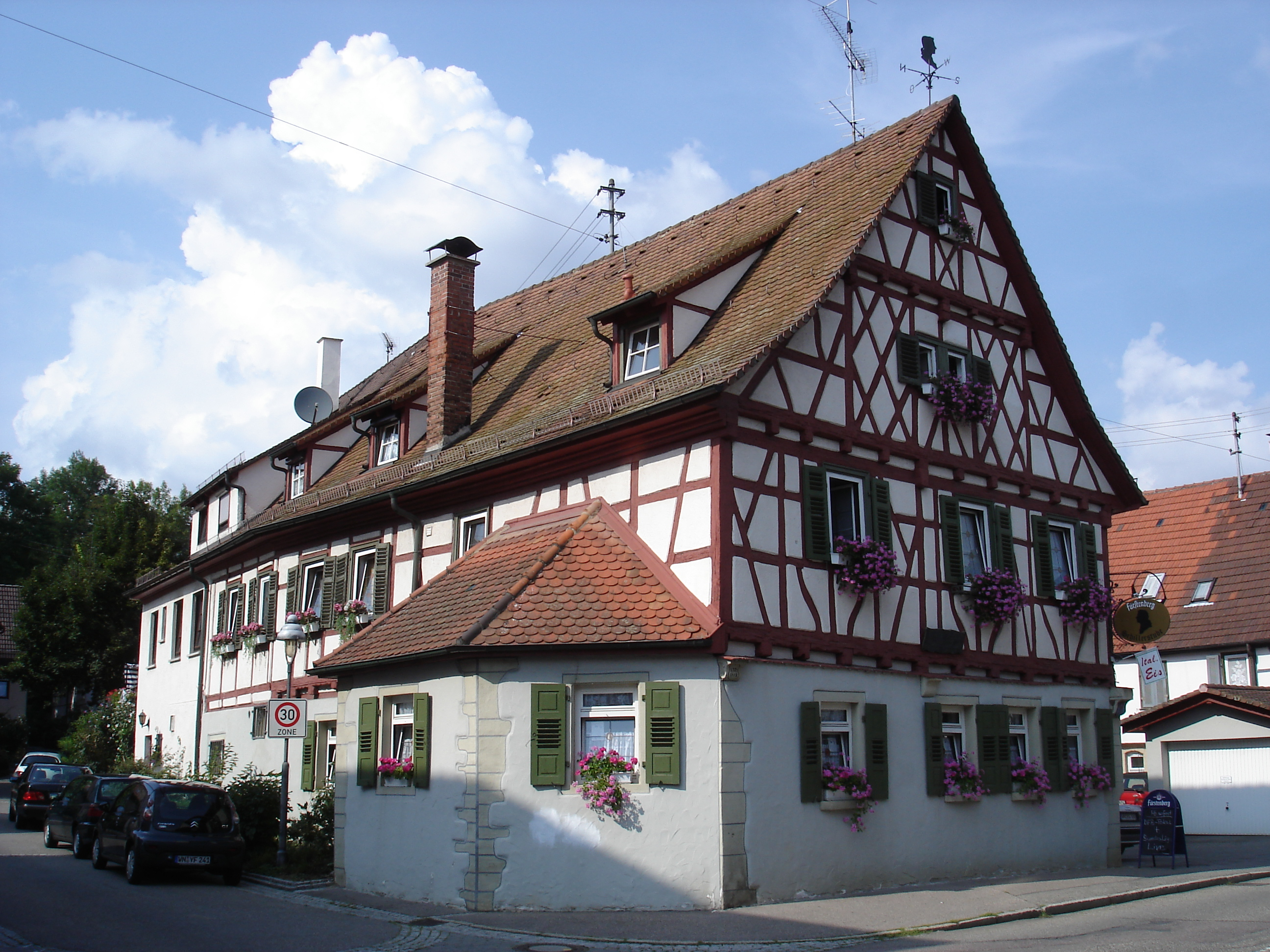
Birthplace in Bittenfeld

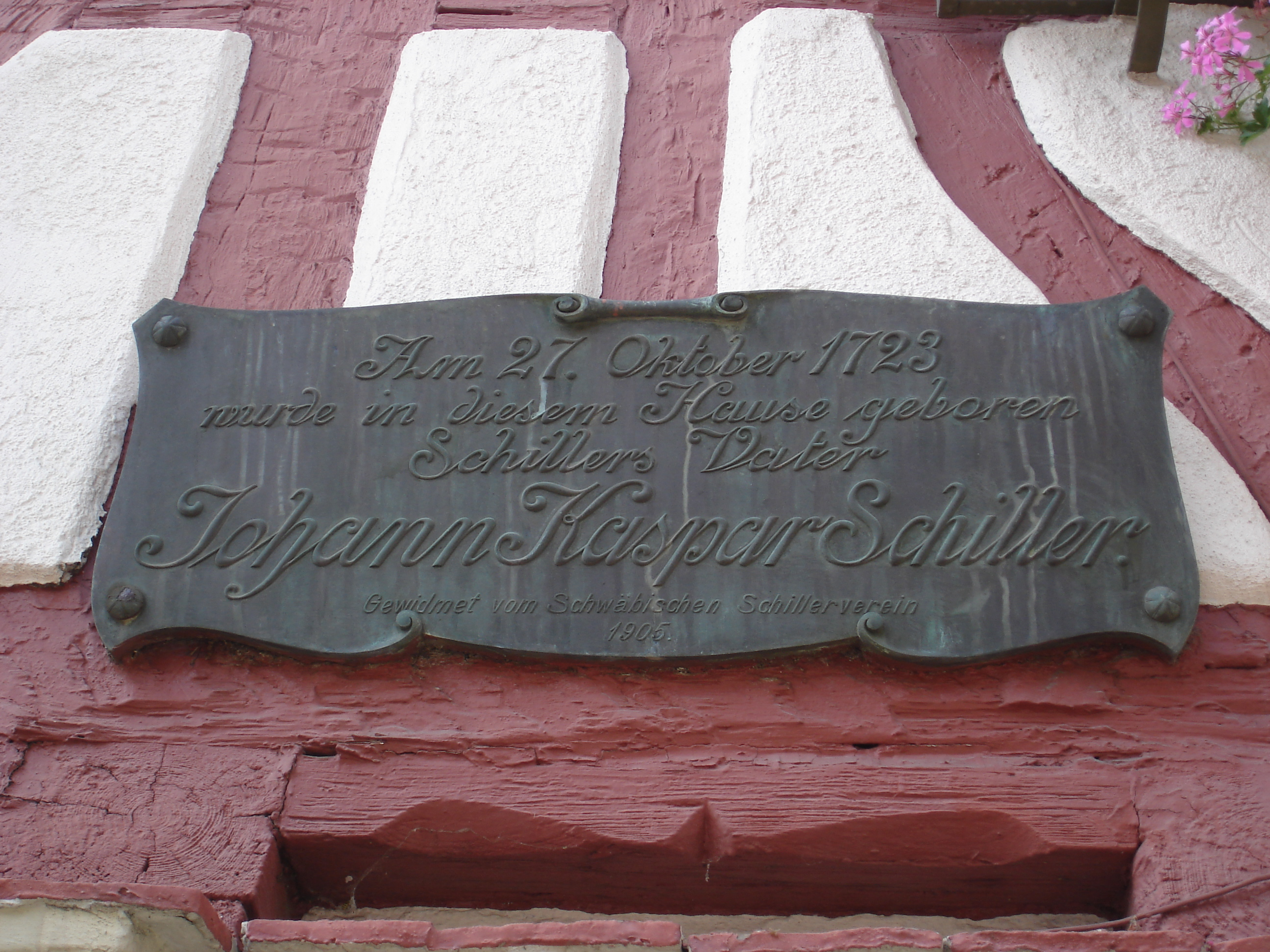
Plaque at his birthplace

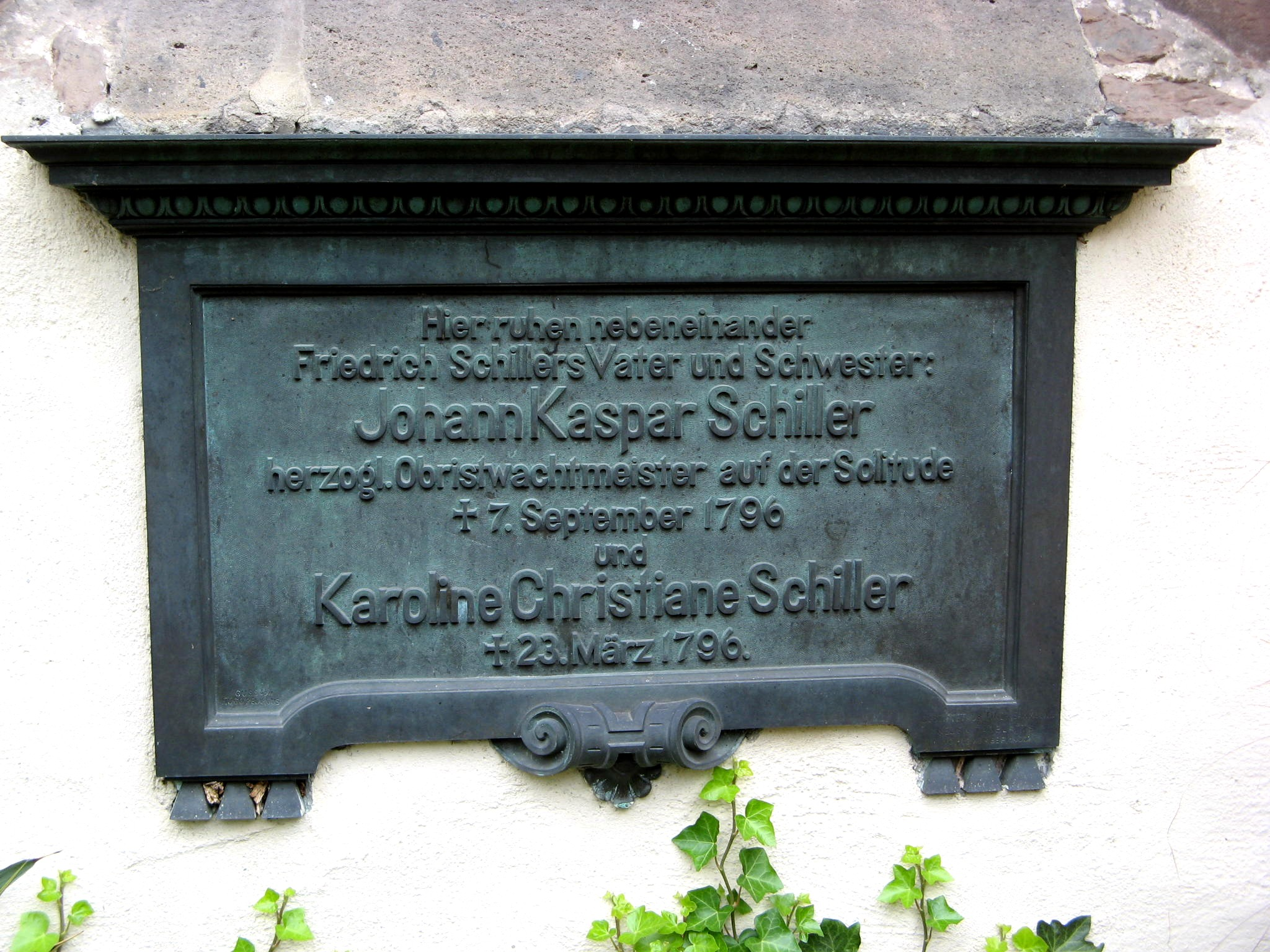
His grave in Gerlingen

Johann Kaspar Schiller (27 October 1723 – 7 September 1796) was an army officer and court gardener to the Dukes of Württemberg. He and his wife Elisabetha Dorothea were the parents of Germany's most important classical playwright, Friedrich Schiller.

== Life ==
Johann Kaspar Schiller was born in 1723 in Bittenfeld – an outlying district of neighbouring Waiblingen – to mayor Johannes Schiller (1682–1733), whose ancestors were mainly vintners and craftsmen in and around Waiblingen, and his wife Eva Margarete Schatz (1690–1778). Johann Kaspar Schiller had several brothers and sisters, including Christine Schiller (1711–1757), who was married to Friedrich Blumhard; Sibylla Schiller (b. 1713), who was married to Johann Friedrich Männer; Anna Magdalena Schiller (1716–1787), who was married to Johann Georg Häberle; Johannes Schiller (1718–1777), Maria Susanna Schiller (1721–1792), Johann Jacob Schiller (1726–1799) and Eva Margaretha Schiller (b. 1728). He initially received private tuition in Latin until 1734. After four years' absence in 1738 he became an apprentice barber-surgeon in Denkendorf and Backnang.

During his travels in 1741, he came to Lindau on Lake Constance and to Nördlingen, among other places. In 1745 he became a soldier and field officer in various military units and states. in 1749 he received the wound doctor's examination in Marbach and in 1753 entered the service of Duke Carl Eugene as a soldier. A lieutenant since 1759, he became Hauptmann in Ludwigsburg in 1767, and finally Obristwachtmeister in 1794. In addition to his military career, Schiller developed numerous suggestions for improving agriculture in Ludwigsburg.

Due to his interests, in 1775 he became the head of the ducal court gardens at Solitude Castle, which later, from 1858 to March 31, 1942, belonged to Gerlingen and since then to Stuttgart. He also headed the forestry tree schools of the state. His nursery at Solitude Castle was considered the largest nursery in southern Germany at the end of the 18th century. From there, at Schiller's instigation, fruit growing was decisively promoted throughout the Duchy of Württemberg. Many scattered fruit stands that still exist today, both in Gerlingen and in the other middle Neckar region, can be traced back to Schiller's activities. His comprehensive work Tree breeding on a large scale was considered an important standard work in fruit growing until well into the 20th century. Today, Schiller is considered a pioneer of modern agriculture at that time. At the time of his death, Schiller was the inspector of all the ducal gardens and nurseries.

On 22 September 1749 in Montag Schiller married Elisabetha Dorothea Kodweiß (1732–1802), daughter of the innkeeper and baker Georg Friedrich Kodweiß (1698–1771) and his wife Anna Maria Kodweiß, nee Munz (1698–1773), with whom he had six children, including his only son Friedrich Schiller (1759–1805), of outstanding importance for German literature, and the well-known eldest daughter Elisabeth Christophine Friederike (1757–1847), which subsequently painter and was a wife of librarian and linguist Wilhelm Friedrich Hermann Reinwald (1737–1815). His other children were Louise Dorothea Catharina Schiller (1766–1836), who was married pastor Johann Gottlieb Franckh (1760–1834), Marie Charlotte Schiller (1768–1774), Beate Friederike Schiller (1773) and Caroline Christiane Schiller (1777–1796), which the family called «Nanett».

His grave, as well as that of his daughter Karoline Christiane, who also died in 1796 at the age of 19, at the Petruskirche in Gerlingen, has survived to this day. In Gerlingen there is also a monument for the entire Schiller family in Kirchstraße.

He died in Solitude Palace and was buried on 9 September 1796 in the Petruskirche in Gerlingen.

== Works ==
- Betrachtungen über landwirthschaftliche Dinge in dem Herzogthum Würtemberg (= Oekonomische Beyträge zur Beförderung des bürgerlichen Wohlstandes. Bd. 1). Cotta, Stuttgart.
  - 1: Vom Ackerbau. 1767.
  - 2: Vom Weinbau. 1767.
    - Vom Weinbau (= Weingeschichte. Bd. 1).
  - 3: Von der Viehezucht. 1767.
  - 4: Von der Baumzucht. 1768.
  - 5: Von ländlichen Gewerben. 1768.
- Die Baumzucht im Großen aus Zwanzigjährigen Erfahrungen im Kleinen in Rücksicht auf ihre Behandlung, Kosten, Nutzen und Ertrag beurtheilt. Hofbuchhandlung, Neustrelitz 1795.
  - Ulmer, Stuttgart 1993, ISBN 3-8001-6514-7.

== Bibliography ==
- (in German) Peter Lahnstein: Schillers Leben. Biographie. Neuausgabe. List, München 1990, ISBN 3-471-78050-5.
- (in German) Friedrich Pfäfflin, Eva Dambacher: Schiller. Ständige Ausstellung des Schiller-Nationalmuseums und des deutschen Literaturarchivs Marbach am Neckar (= Marbacher Kataloge. ISSN 2363-5428, Bd. 32). 3., durchgesehene Auflage. Deutsche Schiller-Gesellschaft, Marbach am Neckar 2001.
- (in German) Constant Wurzbach von Tannenberg: Das Schiller-Buch. Festgabe zur ersten Säcular-Feier von Schiller’s Geburt 1859. Kaiserlich-Königliche Hof- und Staatsdruckerei, Wien 1859 (Johann Kaspar Schiller at Google Books).
