= Die Götter Griechenlandes =

1788 poem by Friedrich Schiller

"The Gods of Greece" ("Die Götter Griechenlandes") is a 1788 poem by the German writer Friedrich Schiller. It was first published in Wieland's Der Teutsche Merkur, with a second, shorter version (with much of its controversial content removed) published by Schiller himself in 1800. Schiller's poem proved influential in light of German Philhellenism and seems to have influenced later German thinkers' views on history, Paganism and myth, possibly including Georg Wilhelm Friedrich Hegel and Max Weber.

== Content ==
The poem describes Schiller's conception of life and nature in antiquity, characterized as a happy and harmonious age, and in turn describes the Christian age as a stage of loss, joylessness, alienation and divisiveness. For Schiller, the reason for this is the replacement of the diversity of the ancient world of gods, which had worked through nature and human life, with a single, comparatively abstract and distant Christian god. He uses the Greek gods as a proxy for the perceived enchantment of nature and the moral-aesthetic values that Schiller associated with this imagined idea of nature. Schiller constructs the poem as a lamentation for myth and enchantment against mechanical philosophy.

== Reception ==
Although (or perhaps because) the poem shows Christian Theosophical influences, The Gods of Greece became controversial when published, as Schiller appeared to defend Paganism against Christianity. This led to its second publication in a shorter form.

Shortly after publication, the poem was criticized as an attack on Christianity, particularly by Friedrich Leopold zu Stolberg-Stolberg. In August 1788, he wrote in Heinrich Christian Boie's magazine Deutsches Museum : "But a spirit who tries to despise virtue is not a good spirit. I see the poetic merit of this poem, but the ultimate purpose of poetry is not itself." He impressed Schiller enough that Schiller substantially reworked the poem, with the involvement of Goethe.

A fragment of this poem was set by Franz Schubert in November 1819 (D677).
