= Friedrich Schiller =

German playwright (1759–1805)

Hofrat (Saxe-Meiningen) Friedrich Schiller
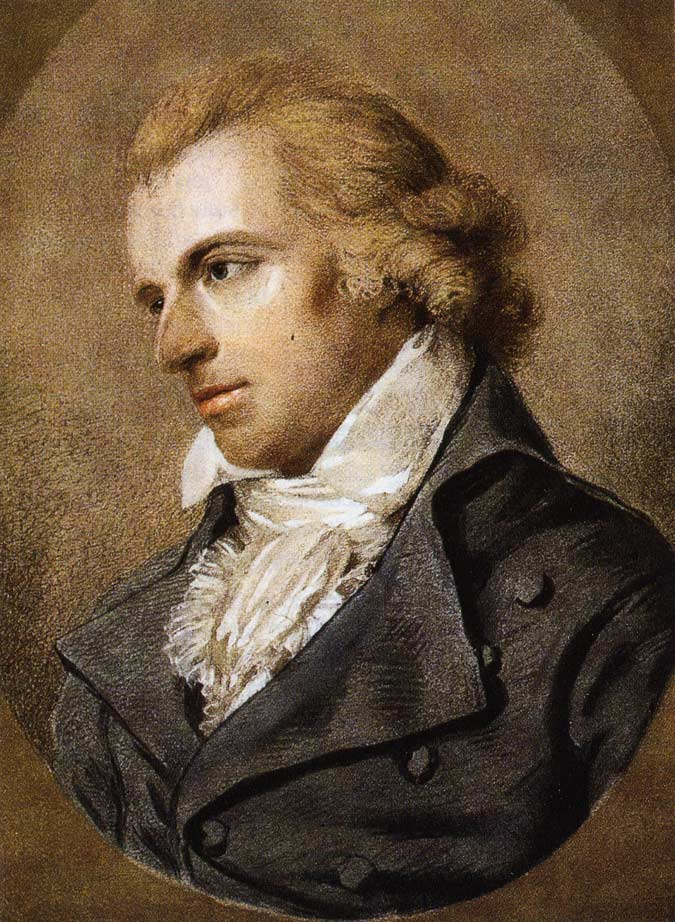
- Portrait, 1793–1794
- Born: Johann Christoph Friedrich Schiller; 10 November 1759; Marbach am Neckar, Duchy of Württemberg
- Died: 9 May 1805 (aged 45); Weimar, Duchy of Saxe-Weimar
- Education: Karlsschule Stuttgart (MD)
- Occupations: Playwright; poet; philosopher; historian
- Spouse: Charlotte von Lengefeld (m. 1790)
- Children: 4
- Relatives: Johann Kaspar Schiller (father); Elisabetha Dorothea Schiller, born Kodweiß (mother); Christophine Reinwald (sister)
- Writing career
- Notable works: The Robbers; William Tell; "Ode to Joy"; Mary Stuart; Wallenstein trilogy; Don Carlos; "Song of the Bell"; On the Aesthetic Education of Man in a Series of Letters
- Movements: Sturm und Drang; Weimar Classicism

Johann Christoph Friedrich von Schiller (German: [ˈjoːhan ˈkʁɪstɔf ˈfʁiːdʁɪç fɔn ˈʃɪlɐ], short: [ˈfʁiːdʁɪç ˈʃɪlɐ]; 10 November 1759 – 9 May 1805) was a German playwright, poet, philosopher and historian. Schiller is considered to be one of Germany's most important classical playwrights. He was one of the most important figures of the Sturm und Drang movement.

He was born in Marbach to a devoutly Lutheran family. Initially intended for the priesthood, in 1773 he entered a military academy in Stuttgart and ended up studying medicine. His first play, The Robbers, was written at this time and proved very successful. After a brief stint as a regimental doctor, he left Stuttgart and eventually wound up in Weimar. In 1789, he became professor of History and Philosophy at the University of Jena, where he wrote historical works.

During the last seventeen years of his life (1788–1805), Schiller developed a productive, if complicated, friendship with the already famous and influential Johann Wolfgang von Goethe. They frequently discussed issues concerning aesthetics, and Schiller encouraged Goethe to finish works that he had left as sketches. This relationship and these discussions led to a period now referred to as Weimar Classicism. Together, they founded the Weimar Theater.

They also worked together on Xenien, a collection of short satirical poems in which both Schiller and Goethe challenge opponents of their philosophical vision.

== Early life and career ==
Friedrich Schiller was born on 10 November 1759, in Marbach, in the Duchy of Württemberg, as the only son of military doctor Johann Kaspar Schiller and Elisabetha Dorothea Schiller. They also had five daughters, including Christophine, the eldest. Schiller grew up in a very religious Lutheran family and spent much of his youth studying the Bible, which would later influence his writing for the theatre. His father was away in the Seven Years' War when Friedrich was born. He was named after king Frederick the Great, but he was called Fritz by nearly everyone. Kaspar Schiller was rarely home during the war, but he did manage to visit the family once in a while. His wife and children also visited him occasionally wherever he happened to be stationed. When the war ended in 1763, Schiller's father became a recruiting officer and was stationed in Schwäbisch Gmünd. The family moved with him. Due to the high cost of living—especially the rent—the family moved to the nearby town of Lorch.

Although the family was happy in Lorch, Schiller's father found his work unsatisfying. He sometimes took his son with him. In Lorch, Schiller received his primary education. The quality of the lessons was fairly bad, and Friedrich regularly cut class with his older sister. Because his parents wanted Schiller to become a priest, they had the priest of the village instruct the boy in Latin and Greek. Father Moser was a good teacher, and later Schiller named the cleric in his first play Die Räuber (The Robbers) after him. As a boy, Schiller was excited by the idea of becoming a cleric and often put on black robes and pretended to preach.

In 1766, the family left Lorch for the Duke of Württemberg's principal residence, Ludwigsburg. Schiller's father had not been paid for three years, and the family had been living on their savings but could no longer afford to do so. So Kaspar Schiller took an assignment to the garrison in Ludwigsburg.

There the boy Schiller came to the attention of Karl Eugen, Duke of Württemberg. He entered the Karlsschule Stuttgart (an elite military academy founded by the Duke), in 1773, where he initially studied law but eventually switched to medicine, graduating with a doctor of medicine in 1780. During most of his short life, he suffered from illnesses that he tried to cure himself.

While at the Karlsschule, Schiller read Rousseau and Goethe and discussed Classical ideals with his classmates. At school, he wrote his first play, The Robbers, which dramatizes the conflict between two aristocratic brothers: the elder, Karl Moor, leads a group of rebellious students into the Bohemian forest where they become Robin Hood-like bandits, while Franz Moor, the younger brother, schemes to inherit his father's considerable estate. The play's critique of social corruption and its affirmation of proto-revolutionary republican ideals astounded its original audience. Schiller became an overnight sensation. Later, Schiller would be made an honorary member of the French Republic because of this play. The play was inspired by Leisewitz' earlier play Julius of Taranto, a favourite of the young Schiller.

In 1780, he obtained a post as regimental doctor in Stuttgart, a job he disliked. In order to attend the first performance of The Robbers in Mannheim, Schiller left his regiment without permission. As a result, he was arrested, sentenced to 14 days of imprisonment, and forbidden by Karl Eugen from publishing any further works.

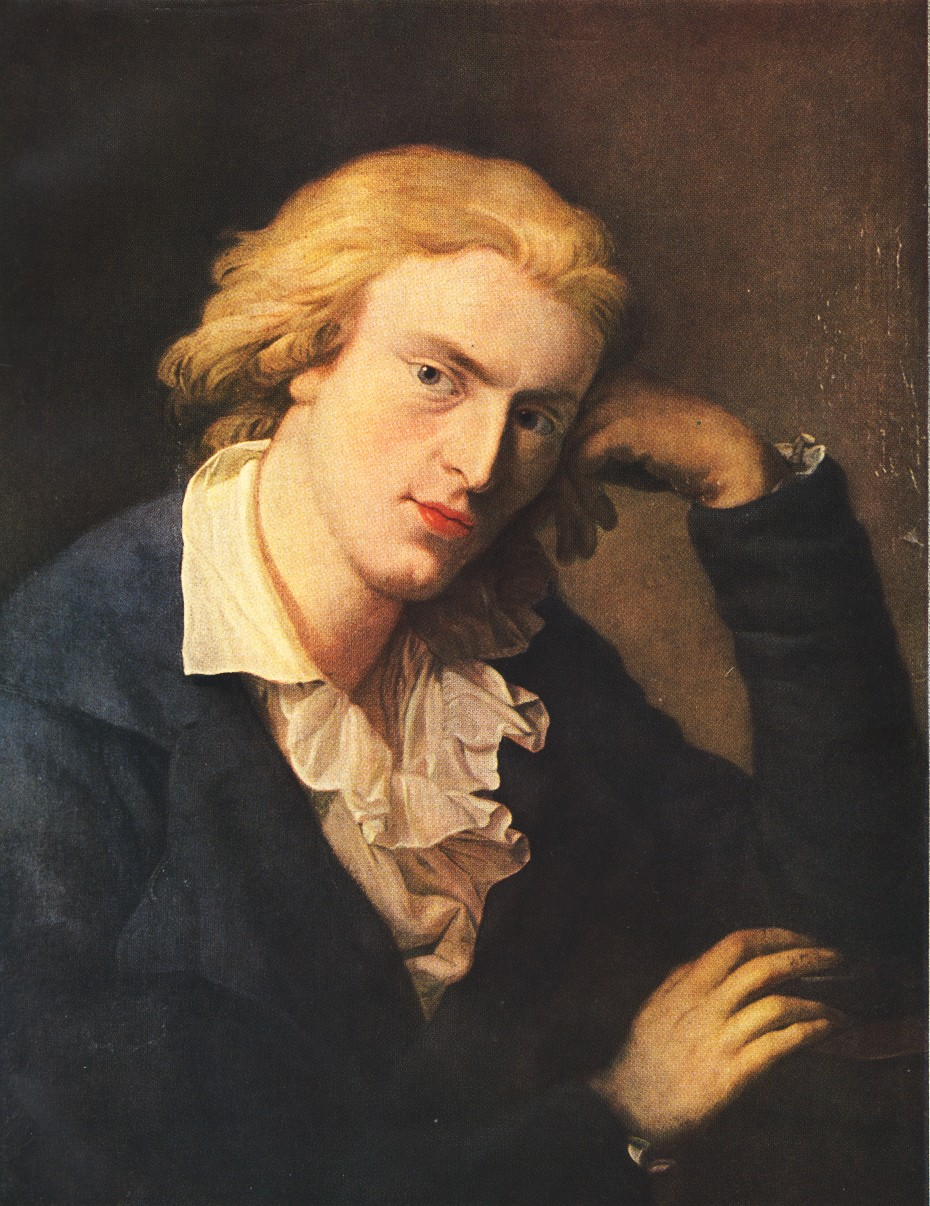
Schiller, painted by Anton Graff, 1786–1791

He fled Stuttgart in 1782, going via Frankfurt, Mannheim, Leipzig, and Dresden to Weimar. During the journey, he had an affair with Charlotte von Kalb, an army officer's wife. At the centre of an intellectual circle, she was known for her cleverness and instability. To extricate himself from a dire financial situation and attachment to a married woman, Schiller eventually sought help from family and friends.

In 1787, he settled in Weimar and in 1789, was appointed professor of History and Philosophy at the University of Jena. His inaugural lecture, What Is, and to What End do We Study, Universal History? (Was heißt und zu welchem Ende studiert man Universalgeschichte?), delivered on 26 May 1789, outlined his philosophy of history and the moral purpose of historical study. In Jena, he wrote historical works.

== Marriage and family ==
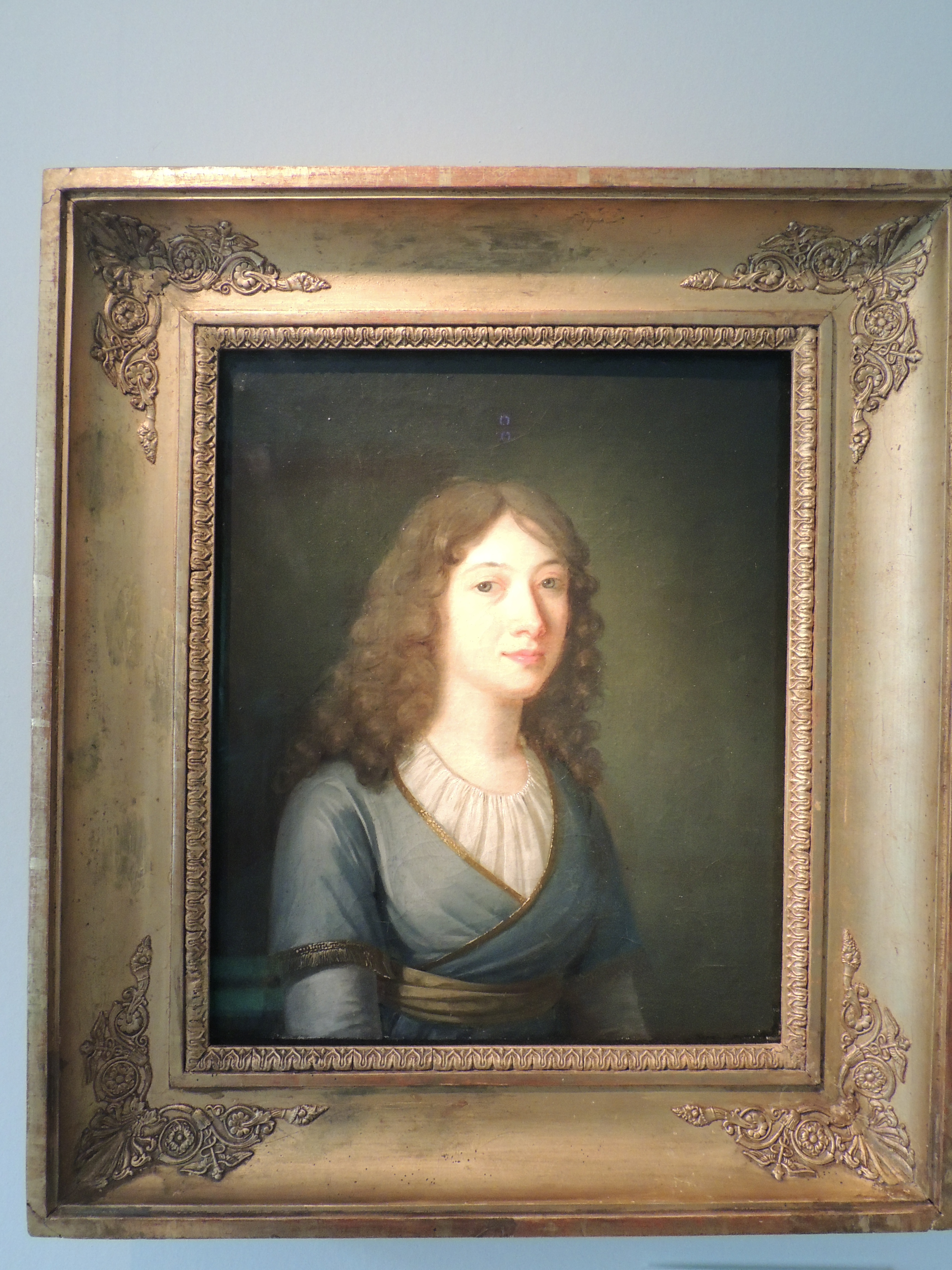
Spouse Charlotte Schiller, née von Lengefeld, painted by Ludovike Simanowiz, 1794

On 22 February 1790, Schiller married Charlotte von Lengefeld, sister of writer Caroline von Wolzogen and daughter of forest administrator of Louis Günther II, Prince of Schwarzburg-Rudolstadt Carl Christoph von Lengefeld and his wife Louise von Lengefeld, née Wurmb.

Karl Friedrich Ludwig (1793–1857) and Ernst Friedrich Wilhelm (1796–1841), Karoline Luise Henriette (1799–1850) and Luise Henriette Emilie (1804–1872) were born between 1793 and 1804. The last living descendant of Schiller was a grandchild of Emilie, Baron Alexander von Gleichen-Rußwurm (1865–1947), who died at Baden-Baden, Germany, in 1947.

== Weimar and later career ==
Schiller returned with his family to Weimar from Jena in 1799. Goethe convinced him to return to playwriting. He and Goethe founded the Weimar Theater, which became the leading theater in Germany. Their collaboration helped lead to a renaissance of drama in Germany.

For his achievements, Schiller was ennobled in 1802 by the Duke of Saxe-Weimar, adding the nobiliary particle "von" to his name. He remained in Weimar, Saxe-Weimar until his death at 45 from tuberculosis in 1805.

== Legacy and honors ==
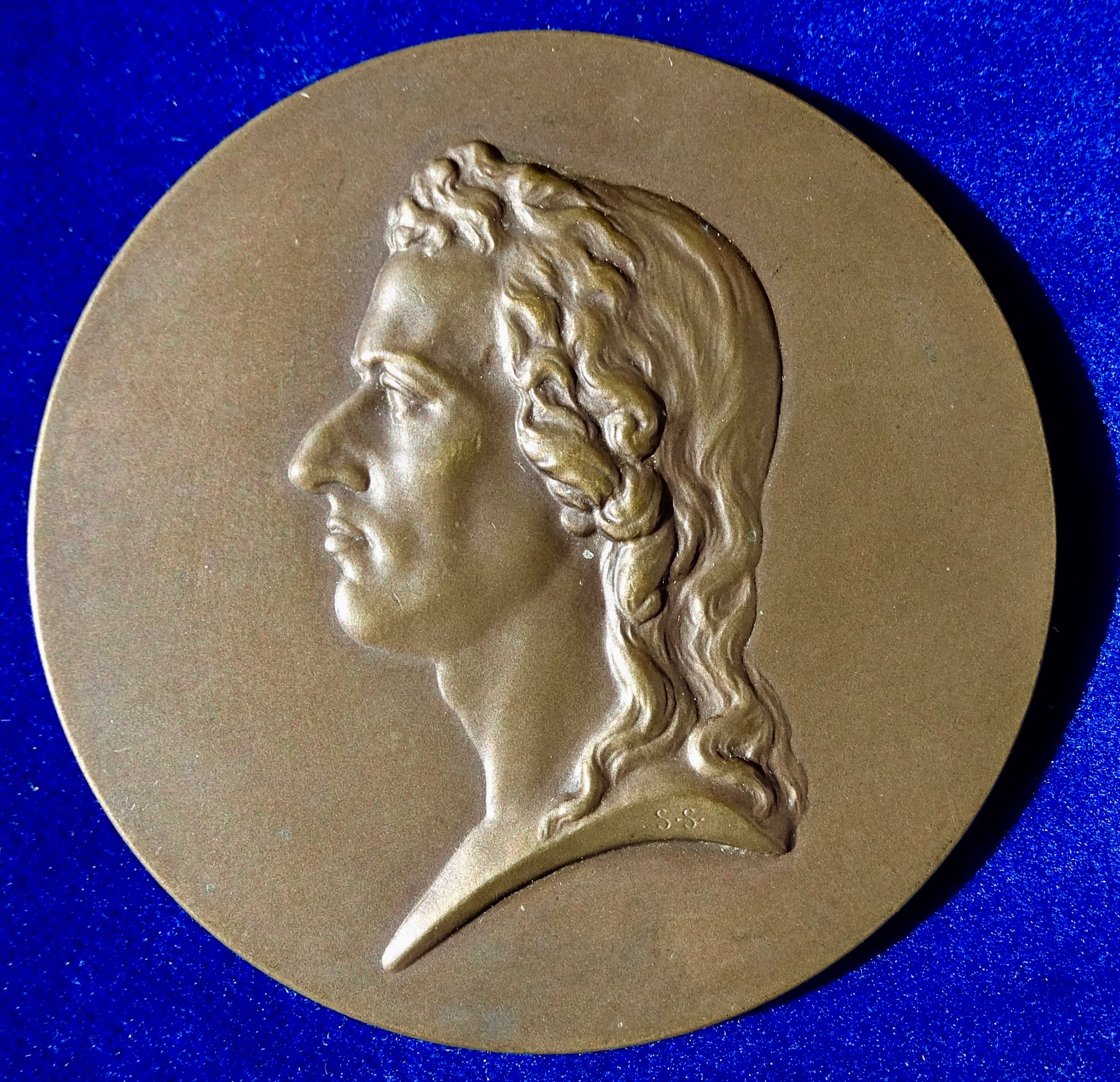
Medal by Stefan Schwartz to his 100th death anniversary, after a sculpture of 1794 by Dannecker, Vienna 1905, obverse

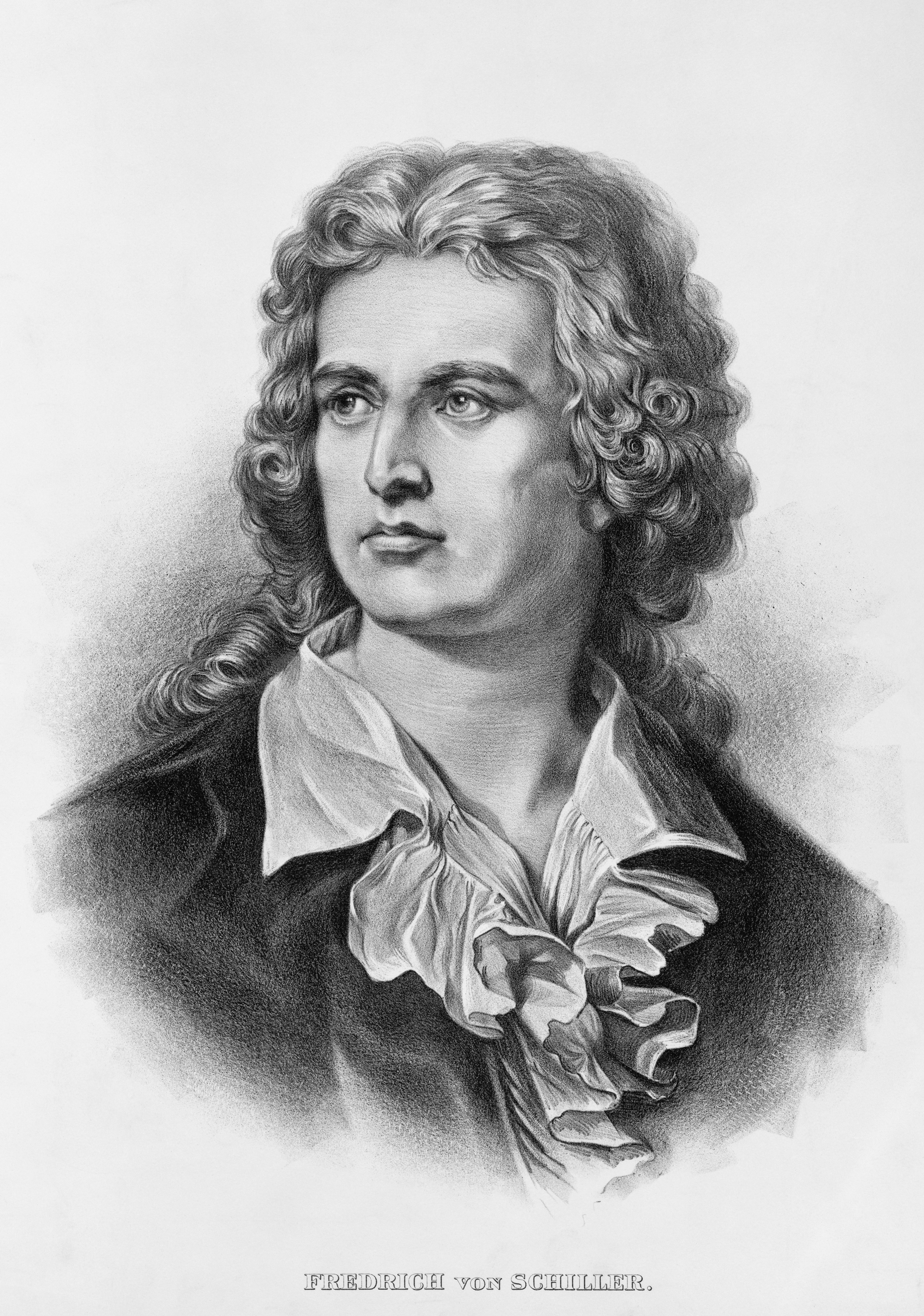
Lithograph portrait from 1905, captioned "Friedrich von Schiller" in recognition of his 1802 ennoblement

The first authoritative biography of Schiller was by his sister-in-law Caroline von Wolzogen in 1830, Schillers Leben (Schiller's Life).

The coffin containing what was purportedly Schiller's skeleton was brought in 1827 into the Weimarer Fürstengruft (Weimar's Ducal Vault), the burial place of the house of Saxe-Weimar-Eisenach in the Historical Cemetery of Weimar and later also Goethe's resting place. On 3 May 2008, scientists announced that DNA tests have shown that the skull of this skeleton is not Schiller's, and his tomb is now vacant. The physical resemblance between this skull and the extant death mask as well as to portraits of Schiller, had led many experts to believe that the skull was Schiller's.

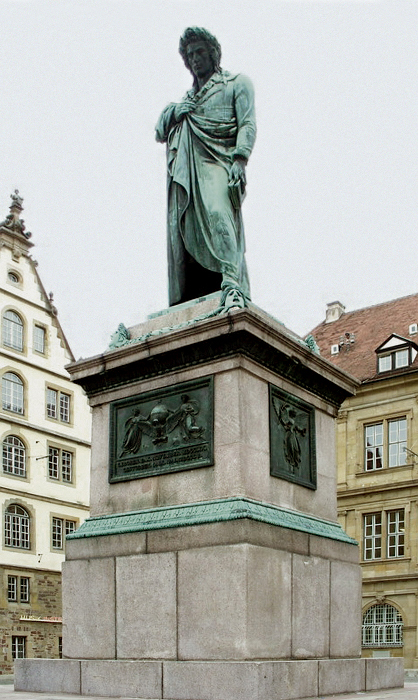
Germany's oldest Schiller memorial (1839) on Schillerplatz, Stuttgart

The city of Stuttgart erected in 1839 a statue in his memory on a square renamed Schillerplatz. A Schiller monument was unveiled on Berlin's Gendarmenmarkt in 1871.

The German-American community of New York City donated a bronze sculpture of Schiller to Central Park in 1859. It was Central Park's first installed sculpture.

Chicago dedicated a statue to Schiller in its Lincoln Park.

Schiller Park in Columbus, Ohio is named for Schiller, and has been centered on a statue of his likeness since it was donated in 1891. During the First World War, the name of the park was changed to Washington Park in response to anti-German sentiment, but was changed back several years later. It is the primary park for the South Side neighborhood of German Village.

There is a Friedrich Schiller statue on Belle Isle in Detroit, Michigan. This statue of the German playwright was commissioned by Detroit's German-American community in 1908 at a cost of $12,000; the designer was Herman Matzen.

An Ignatium Taschner bronze of Johann Christoph Friedrich von Schiller stands in Como Park in Saint Paul, Minnesota. It was dedicated in 1907. The sculpture was donated by U.S. German Societies of Saint Paul and private citizens of German descent to commemorate the renowned Johann von Schiller.

Schiller is an unofficial mascot of Carleton College in Northfield, Minnesota. Since 1957, a plaster bust of Schiller has made regular appearances at large campus events, and has featured on The Colbert Report in March 2010, Desperate Housewives in May 2012, and MSNBC with Jonathan Capehart in March 2025.

His image has appeared on several coins and banknotes in Germany, including the 1964 German Democratic Republic 10 Mark banknotes, 1972 German Democratic Republic 20 Mark commemorative coins, and 1934 German Reich 5 Reichsmark commemorative coins.

In September 2008, the German-French TV channel Arte conducted a poll among its viewers to determine the greatest European playwright ("King of Drama"). Schiller was voted in second place after William Shakespeare.

== Siblings ==
Friedrich Schiller had five sisters, two of whom died in childhood and three of whom lived to adulthood:

- Elizabeth Christophine Friederike Schiller (1757–1847) – painter, was married librarian Wilhelm Friedrich Hermann Reinwald (1737–1815), no children.
- Louisa Dorothea Catharina Schiller (1766–1836) – married the pastor Johann Gottlieb Franckh (1760–1834).
- Marie Charlotte Schiller (1768–1774)
- Beata Friederike Schiller (1773)
- Caroline Christiane Schiller (1777–1796)

== Writing ==
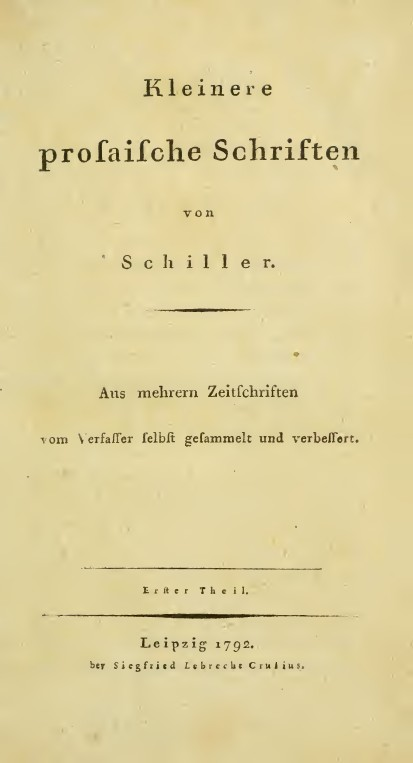
Kleinere prosaische Schriften. 1 (1792)

=== Philosophical papers ===
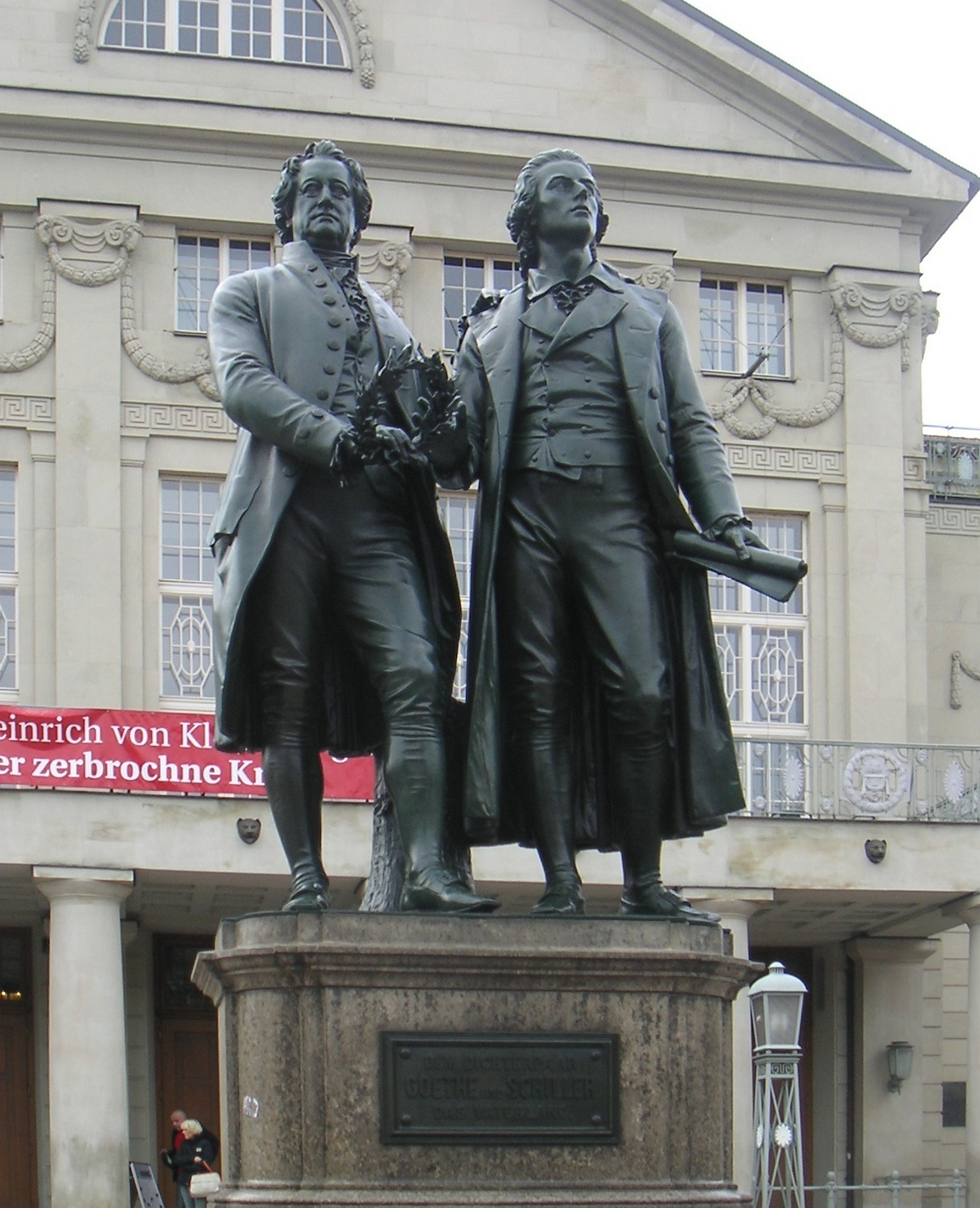
Goethe–Schiller Monument (1857), Weimar

Schiller wrote many philosophical papers on ethics and aesthetics. He synthesized the thought of Immanuel Kant with the thought of the German idealist philosopher, Karl Leonhard Reinhold. He elaborated upon Christoph Martin Wieland's concept of die schöne Seele (the beautiful soul), a human being whose emotions have been educated by reason, so that Pflicht und Neigung (duty and inclination) are no longer in conflict with one another; thus beauty, for Schiller, is not merely an aesthetic experience, but a moral one as well: the Good is the Beautiful. The link between morality and aesthetics also occurs in Schiller's controversial poem, "Die Götter Griechenlandes" (The Gods of Greece). The "gods" in Schiller's poem are thought by modern scholars to represent moral and aesthetic values, which Schiller tied to Paganism and an idea of enchanted nature. In this respect, Schiller's aesthetic doctrine shows the influence of Christian theosophy.

There is general consensus among scholars that it makes sense to think of Schiller as a liberal, and he is frequently cited as a cosmopolitan thinker. Schiller's philosophical work was particularly concerned with the question of human freedom, a preoccupation which also guided his historical research, such as on the Thirty Years' War and the Dutch Revolt, and then found its way as well into his dramas: the Wallenstein trilogy concerns the Thirty Years' War, while Don Carlos addresses the revolt of the Netherlands against Spain. Schiller wrote two important essays on the question of the sublime (das Erhabene), entitled "Vom Erhabenen" and "Über das Erhabene"; these essays address one aspect of human freedom—the ability to defy one's animal instincts, such as the drive for self-preservation, when, for example, someone willingly sacrifices themselves for conceptual ideals.

=== Plays ===
Schiller is considered to be one of Germany's most important classical playwrights. Critics like F. J. Lamport and Erich Auerbach have noted his innovative use of dramatic structure and his creation of new forms, such as the melodrama and the bourgeois tragedy. What follows is a brief chronological description of the plays.

- The Robbers (Die Räuber): The language of The Robbers is highly emotional, and the depiction of physical violence in the play marks it as a quintessential work of Germany's Romantic Sturm und Drang movement. The Robbers is considered by critics like Peter Brooks to be the first European melodrama. The play pits two brothers against each other in alternating scenes, as one quests for money and power, while the other attempts to create revolutionary anarchy in the Bohemian Forest. The play strongly criticises the hypocrisies of class and religion, and the economic inequities of German society; it also conducts a complicated inquiry into the nature of evil. Schiller was inspired by the play Julius of Taranto by Johann Anton Leisewitz.
- Fiesco (Die Verschwörung des Fiesco zu Genua):
- Intrigue and Love (Kabale und Liebe): The aristocratic Ferdinand von Walter wishes to marry Luise Miller, the bourgeois daughter of the city's music instructor. Court politics involving the duke's beautiful but conniving mistress Lady Milford and Ferdinand's ruthless father create a disastrous situation reminiscent of Shakespeare's Romeo and Juliet. Schiller develops his criticisms of absolutism and bourgeois hypocrisy in this bourgeois tragedy. Act 2, scene 2 is an anti-British parody that depicts a firing-squad massacre. Young Germans who refused to join the Hessians and British to quash the American Revolutionary War are fired upon.
- Don Carlos: This play marks Schiller's entrée into historical drama. Very loosely based on the events surrounding the real Don Carlos of Spain, Schiller's Don Carlos is another republican figure—he attempts to free Flanders from the despotic grip of his father, King Phillip. The Marquis Posa's famous speech to the king proclaims Schiller's belief in personal freedom and democracy.
- The Wallenstein trilogy: Consisting of Wallenstein's Camp, The Piccolomini, and Wallenstein's Death, these plays tell the story of the last days and assassination of the treasonous commander Albrecht von Wallenstein during the Thirty Years' War.
- Mary Stuart (Maria Stuart): This history of the Scottish queen, who was Elizabeth I's rival, portrays Mary Stuart as a tragic heroine, misunderstood and used by ruthless politicians, including and especially, Elizabeth.
- The Maid of Orleans (Die Jungfrau von Orleans): about Joan of Arc
- The Bride of Messina (Die Braut von Messina)
- William Tell (Wilhelm Tell)
- Demetrius (unfinished)

=== Aesthetic Letters ===
A pivotal work by Schiller was On the Aesthetic Education of Man in a Series of Letters (Über die ästhetische Erziehung des Menschen in einer Reihe von Briefen), first published 1794, which was inspired by the great disenchantment Schiller felt about the French Revolution, its degeneration into violence and the failure of successive governments to put its ideals into practice. Schiller wrote that "a great moment has found a little people"; he wrote the Letters as a philosophical inquiry into what had gone wrong, and how to prevent such tragedies in the future. In the Letters he asserts that it is possible to elevate the moral character of a people, by first touching their souls with beauty, an idea that is also found in his poem Die Künstler (The Artists): "Only through Beauty's morning-gate, dost thou penetrate the land of knowledge."

On the philosophical side, Letters put forth the notion of der sinnliche Trieb / Sinnestrieb ("the sensuous drive") and Formtrieb ("the formal drive"). In a comment to Immanuel Kant's philosophy, Schiller transcends the dualism between Formtrieb and Sinnestrieb with the notion of Spieltrieb ("the play drive"), derived from, as are a number of other terms, Kant's Critique of the Faculty of Judgment. The conflict between man's material, sensuous nature and his capacity for reason (Formtrieb being the drive to impose conceptual and moral order on the world), Schiller resolves with the happy union of Formtrieb and Sinnestrieb, the "play drive", which for him is synonymous with artistic beauty, or "living form". On the basis of Spieltrieb, Schiller sketches in Letters a future ideal state (a eutopia), where everyone will be content, and everything will be beautiful, thanks to the free play of Spieltrieb. Schiller's focus on the dialectical interplay between Formtrieb and Sinnestrieb has inspired a wide range of succeeding aesthetic philosophical theory, including notably Jacques Rancière's conception of the "aesthetic regime of art", as well as social philosophy in Herbert Marcuse. In the second part of his important work Eros and Civilization, Marcuse finds Schiller's notion of Spieltrieb useful in thinking a social situation without the condition of modern social alienation. He writes, "Schiller's Letters ... aim at remaking of civilization by virtue of the liberating force of the aesthetic function: it is envisaged as containing the possibility of a new reality principle."

=== Freemasonry ===
Some Freemasons speculate that Schiller was a Freemason, but this has not been proven. In 1787, in his tenth letter about Don Carlos, Schiller wrote: "I am neither Illuminatus nor Mason, but if the fraternization has a moral purpose in common with one another, and if this purpose for human society is the most important, ..." In a letter from 1829, two Freemasons from Rudolstadt complain about the dissolving of their Lodge Günther zum stehenden Löwen that was honoured by the initiation of Schiller. According to Schiller's great-grandson Alexander von Gleichen-Rußwurm, Schiller was brought to the lodge by Wilhelm Heinrich Karl von Gleichen-Rußwurm. No membership document has been found.

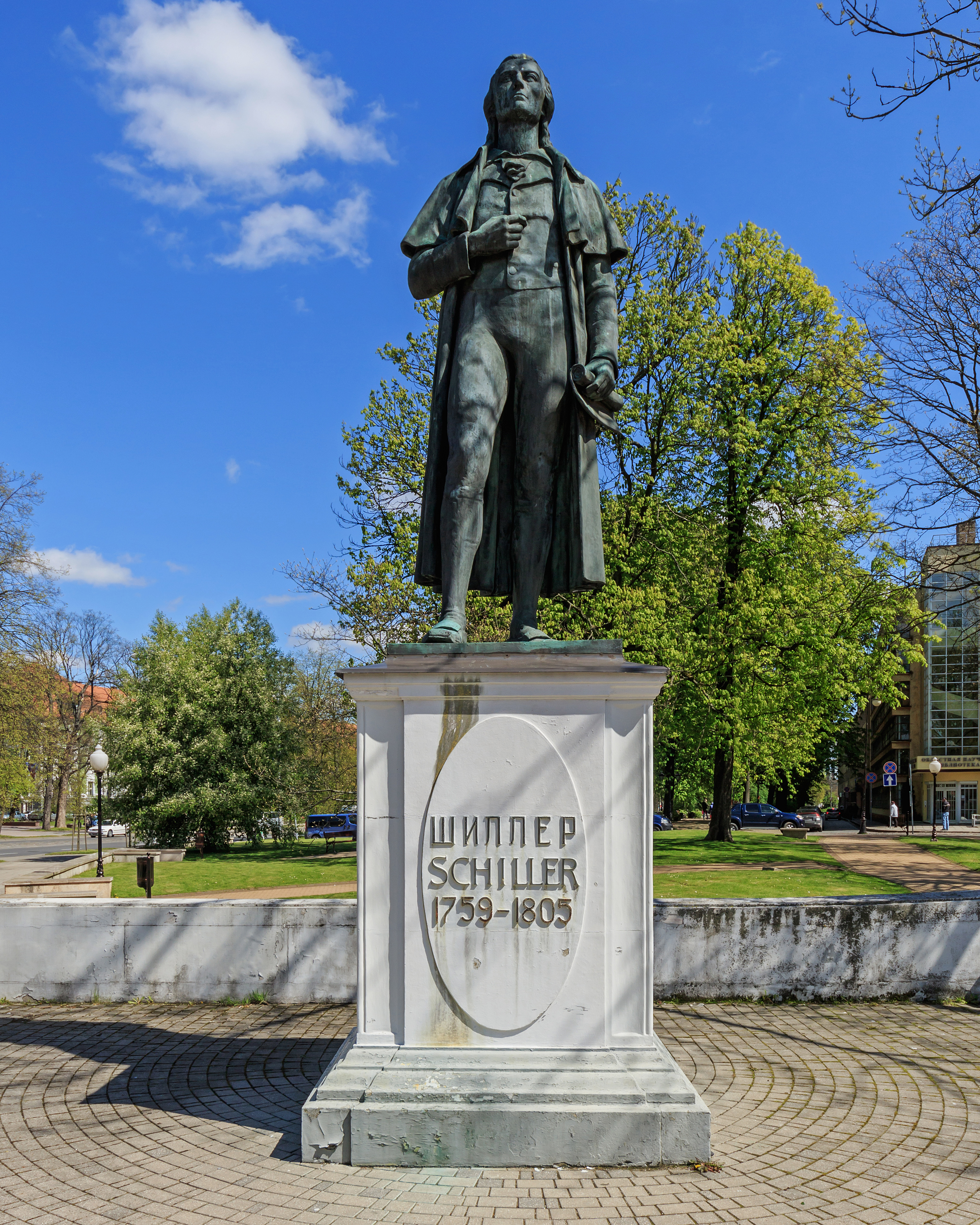
Monument in Kaliningrad (formerly Königsberg), Russia

== Musical settings ==
Ludwig van Beethoven said that a great poem is more difficult to set to music than a merely good one because the composer must rise higher than the poet – "who can do that in the case of Schiller? In this respect Goethe is much easier," wrote Beethoven.

There are relatively few famous musical settings of Schiller's poems. Notable exceptions are Beethoven's setting of "An die Freude" (Ode to Joy) in the final movement of his Ninth Symphony, Johannes Brahms' choral setting of "Nänie", and "Des Mädchens Klage" by Franz Schubert, who set 44 of Schiller's poems as Lieder, mostly for voice and piano, also including "Die Bürgschaft".

The Italian composer Giuseppe Verdi admired Schiller greatly and adapted several of his stage plays for his operas:

- I masnadieri is based on The Robbers
- Giovanna d'Arco is based on The Maid of Orleans
- Luisa Miller is based on Intrigue and Love
- La forza del destino is based partly on Wallenstein's Camp
- Don Carlos is based on the play of the same title

Donizetti's Maria Stuarda is based on Mary Stuart; Rossini's Guillaume Tell is an adaptation of William Tell. Nicola Vaccai's Giovanna d'Arco (1827) is based on The Maid of Orleans, and his La sposa di Messina (1839) on The Bride of Messina. Bruch's The Lay of the Bell is also based on a poem by Schiller. Elise Schmezer (1810–1856) used Schiller's text for her Lied "Das Geheimnis". Tchaikovsky's 1881 opera The Maid of Orleans is partly based on Schiller's work. In 1923, German composer Frieda Schmitt-Lermann wrote the music for a theatre production (Das Lied von der Glocke) based on Schiller's text. German-Russian composer Zinaida Petrovna Ziberova created a musical setting for Schiller's William Tell in 1935. The 20th-century composer Giselher Klebe adapted The Robbers for his first opera of the same name, which premiered in 1957.

== Burial ==
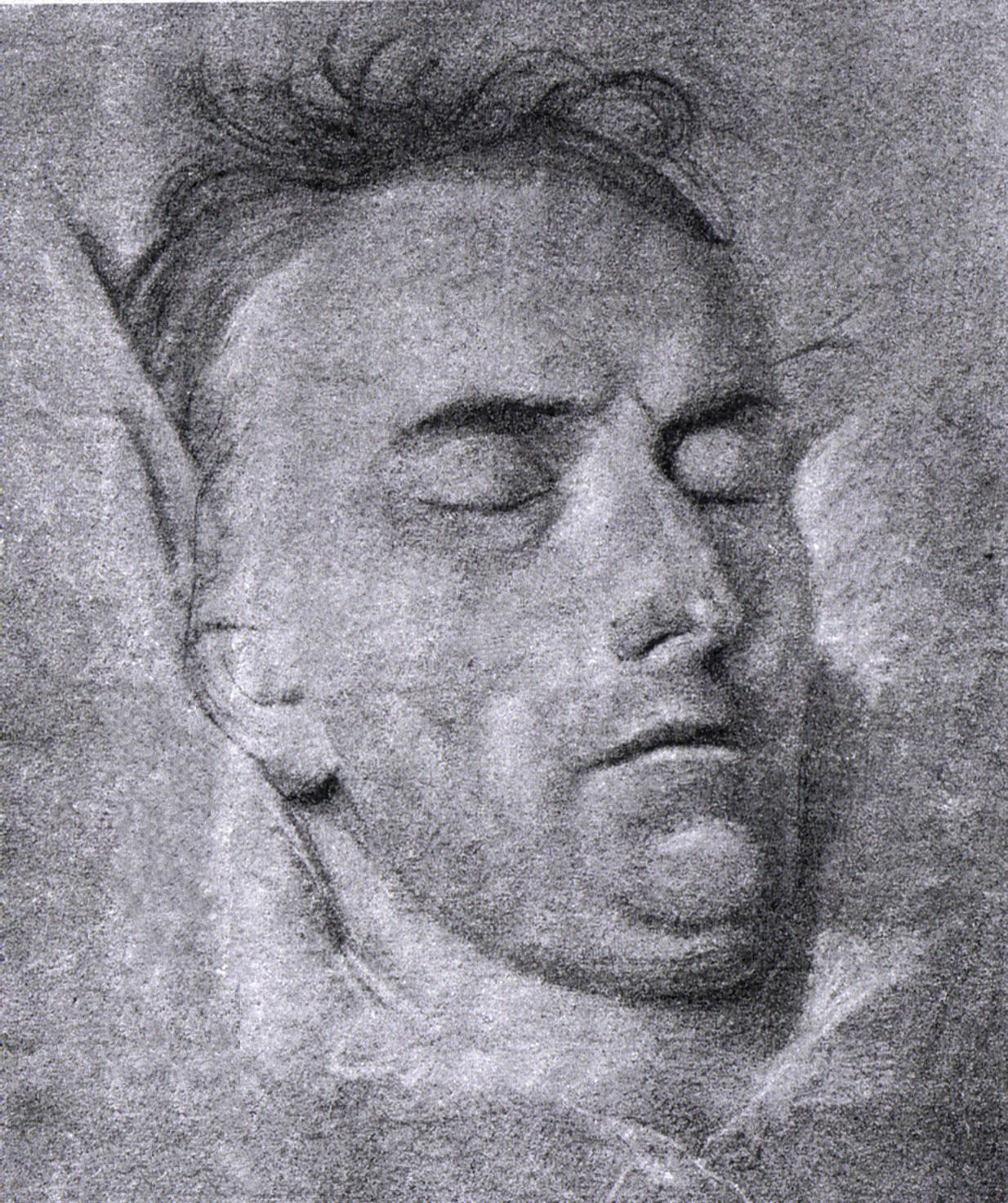
Schiller on his deathbed – drawing by the portraitist Ferdinand Jagemann, 1805

A poem written about the poet's burial:

Two dim and paltry torches that the raging storm
And rain at any moment threaten to put out.
A waving pall. A vulgar coffin made of pine
With not a wreath, not e'en the poorest, and no train –
As if a crime were swiftly carried to the grave!
The bearers hastened onward. One unknown alone,
Round whom a mantle waved of wide and noble fold,
Followed this coffin. 'Twas the Spirit of Mankind.

— Conrad Ferdinand Meyer

== Works ==
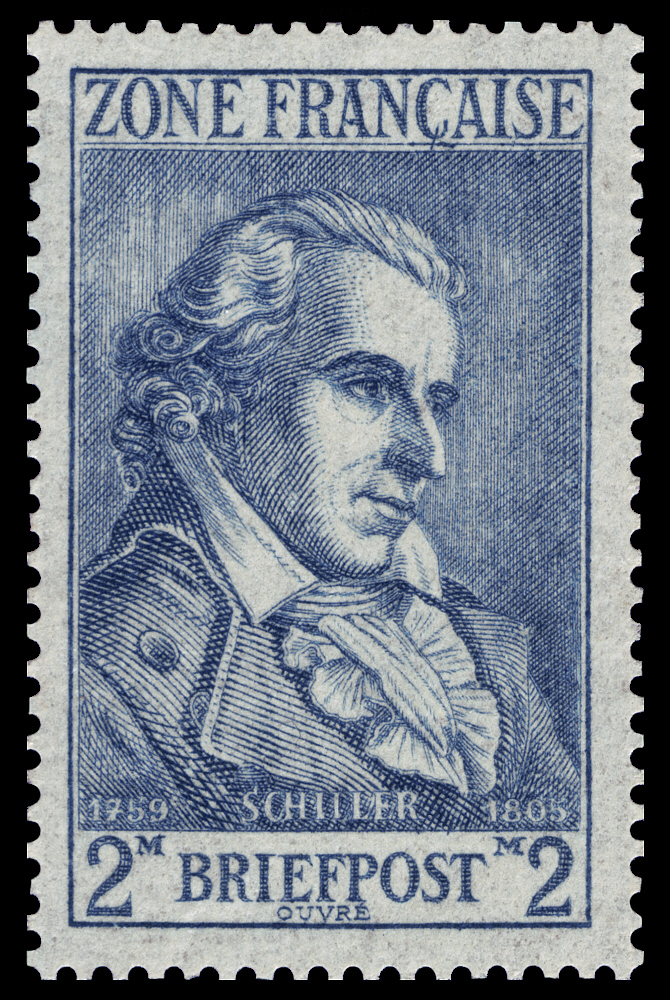
French-occupied German stamp depicting Schiller

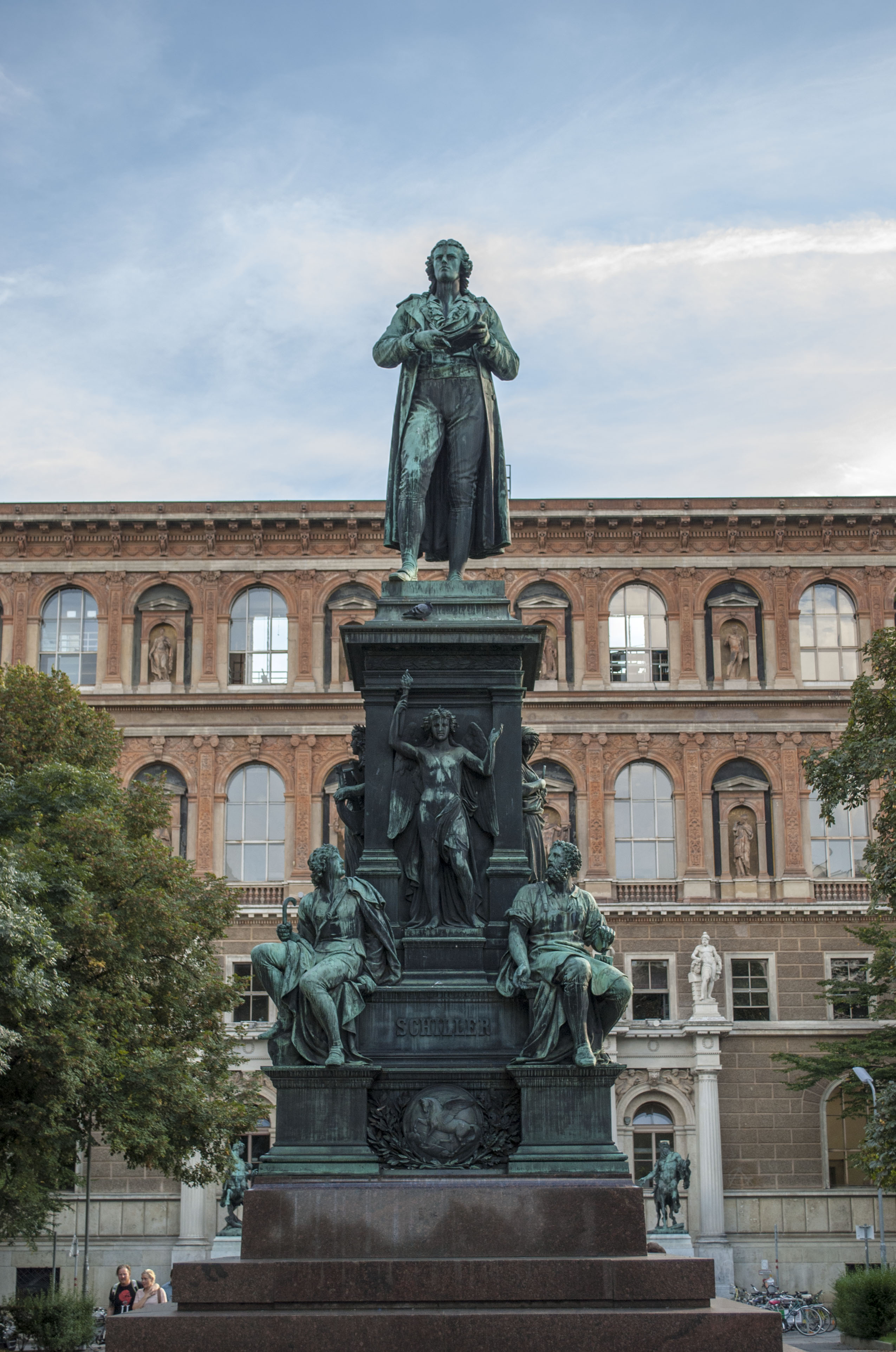
Monument on Schillerplatz in Vienna

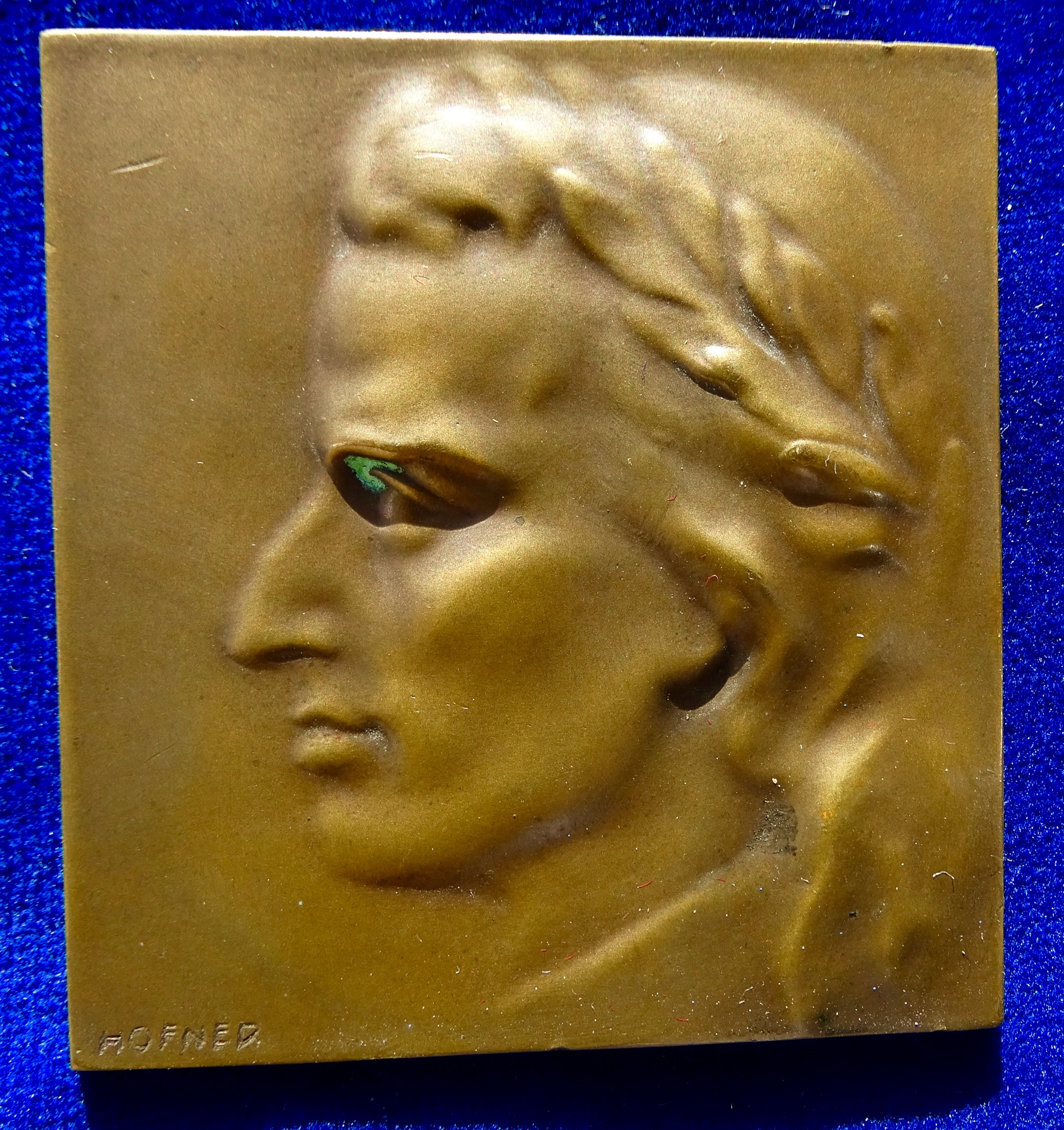
Bronze-Plaque-Medal of Schiller's laureate head by the Austrian artist Otto Hofner

Plays

- Die Räuber (The Robbers), 1781
- Fiesco (Die Verschwörung des Fiesco zu Genua), 1783
- Kabale und Liebe (Intrigue and Love), 1784
- Don Karlos, Infant von Spanien (Don Carlos), (Note: Mike Poulton translated this play in 2004.) 1787
- Wallenstein, (Note: Wallenstein was translated from a manuscript copy into English as The Piccolomini and Death of Wallenstein by Coleridge in 1800.) 1799
- Maria Stuart (Mary Stuart), 1800
- Die Jungfrau von Orleans (The Maid of Orleans), 1801
- Turandot, Prinzessin von China, 1801
- Die Braut von Messina (The Bride of Messina), 1803
- Wilhelm Tell (William Tell), 1804
- Demetrius (unfinished at his death)

Histories

- Was heißt und zu welchem Ende studiert man Universalgeschichte? or What Is, and to What End do We Study, Universal History?, 1789
- Geschichte des Abfalls der vereinigten Niederlande von der spanischen Regierung or The Revolt of the Netherlands
- Geschichte des dreißigjährigen Kriegs or A History of the Thirty Years' War
- Über Völkerwanderung, Kreuzzüge und Mittelalter or On the Barbarian Invasions, Crusades and Middle Ages

Translations

- Euripides, Iphigenia in Aulis
- William Shakespeare, Macbeth
- Jean Racine, Phèdre
- Carlo Gozzi, Turandot, 1801
- Louis-Benoît Picard, Der Neffe als Onkel

Prose

- Der Geisterseher or The Ghost-Seer (unfinished novel) (started in 1786 and published periodically. Published as book in 1789)
- Über die ästhetische Erziehung des Menschen in einer Reihe von Briefen (On the Aesthetic Education of Man in a Series of Letters), 1795
- Der Verbrecher aus verlorener Ehre (Dishonoured Irreclaimable), 1786

Poems

- "An die Freude" ("Ode to Joy") (1785) became the basis for the fourth movement of Beethoven's ninth symphony
- "Der Taucher" ("The Diver"; set to music by Schubert)
- "Die Kraniche des Ibykus" ("The Cranes of Ibykus")
- "Der Ring des Polykrates" ("Polycrates' Ring")
- "Die Bürgschaft" ("The Hostage"; set to music by Schubert)
- "Das Lied von der Glocke" ("Song of the Bell")
- "Das verschleierte Bild zu Sais" ("The Veiled Statue at Sais")
- "Der Handschuh" ("The Glove")
- "Nänie" (set to music by Brahms)

== See also ==
- Christian Gottfried Körner
- Musen-Almanach
- Schillerhaus
- The Theatre Considered as a Moral Institution
