= Marbach am Neckar =

Municipality in Baden-Württemberg, Germany

- Town
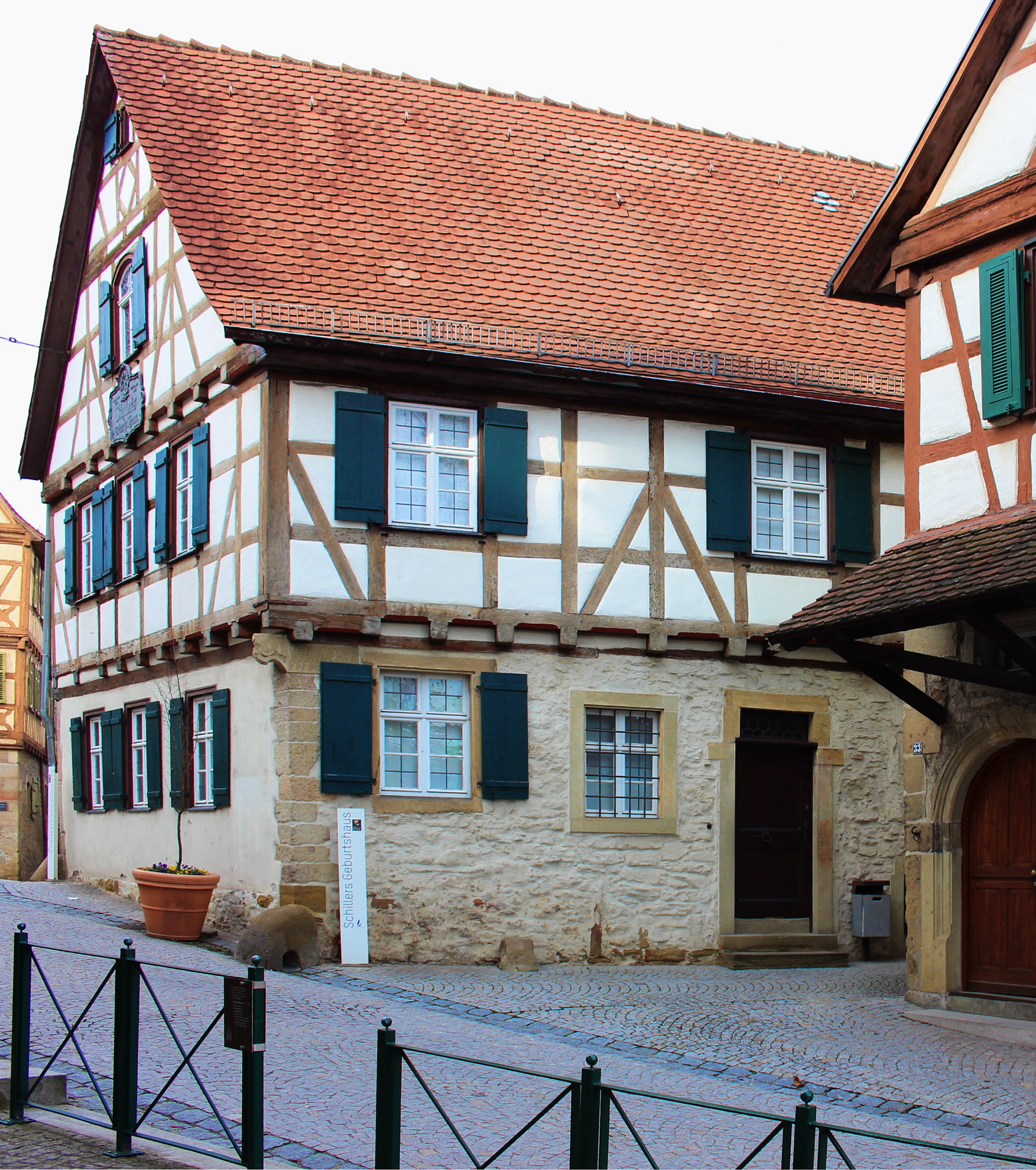
- Friedrich Schiller's birthplace

- Coat of arms

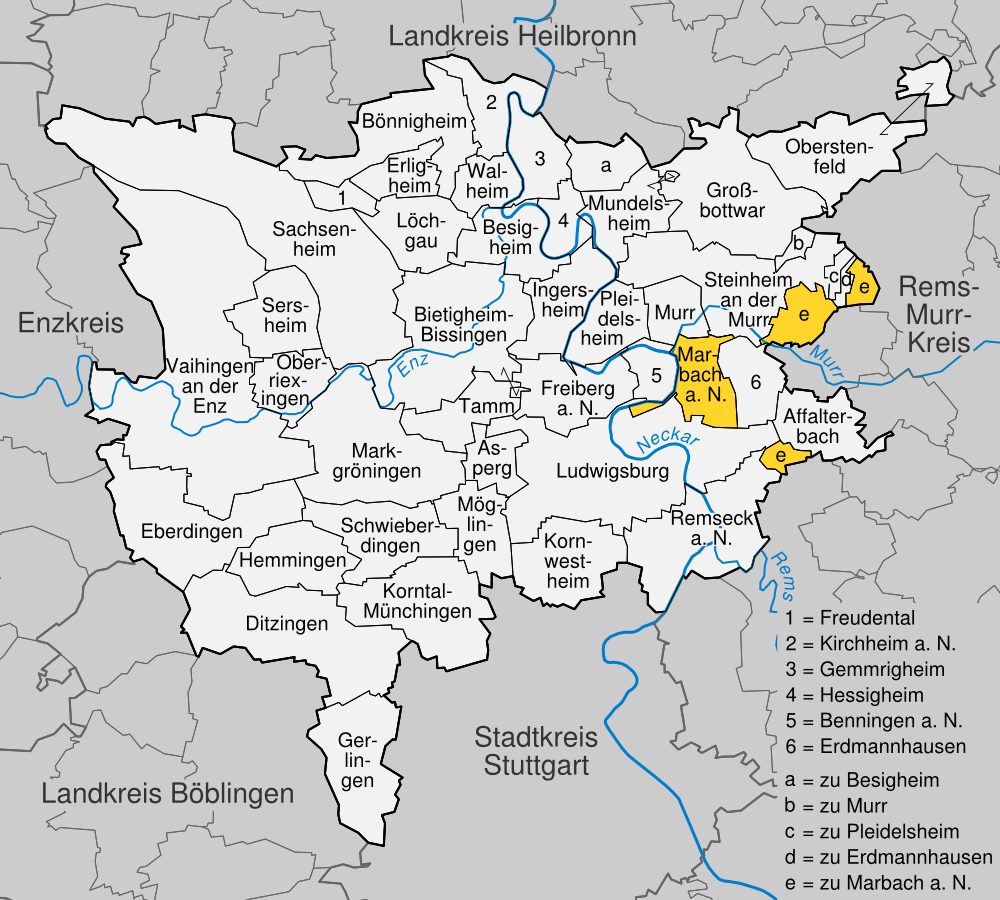
- Location of Marbach am Neckar within Ludwigsburg district
- Interactive map of Marbach am Neckar
- Location within Germany Location within Baden-Württemberg
- Coordinates: 48°56′N 9°15′E
- Country: Germany
- State: Baden-Württemberg
- Admin. region: Stuttgart
- District: Ludwigsburg

Government
  - Mayor: Jan Trost

Area
  - Total: 18.06 km^{2} (6.97 sq mi)
- Elevation: 224 m (735 ft)

Population (2025-12-31)
  - Total: 15,348
  - Density: 849.8/km^{2} (2,201/sq mi)
- Time zone: UTC+01:00 (CET)
  - Summer (DST): UTC+02:00 (CEST)
- Postal codes: 71672
- Dialling codes: 07144
- Vehicle registration: LB
- Website: www.schillerstadt-marbach.de

Marbach am Neckar (German pronunciation: [ˈmaʁbax ʔam ˈnɛkaʁ], lit. 'Marbach on the Neckar') is a town about 20 kilometres north of Stuttgart. It belongs to the district of Ludwigsburg, the Stuttgart region and the European metropolitan region of Stuttgart. Marbach is known as the birthplace of Friedrich Schiller, to whom it owes the additional designation of Schiller City, which it has officially held since 2022. The town is home to the Schiller National Museum, the German Literature Archive and the Modern Literature Museum.

== Geography ==
=== Geographical location ===
Marbach is located in the Neckar Basin on the eastern bank of a loop of the Neckar, whose impact slope is interrupted by two deep cuts. The northern of the two cuts is flowed through by the largely blocked Strenzelbach stream, the southern by the Eichgraben ditch. Marbach's old town lies on the southern slope of the Strenzelbach valley, some 30 metres above the Neckar, while the newer residential and commercial areas are spread across the slopes further to the north-east, east and south. Even further south, somewhat secluded by the cutting of the Eichgraben, is the residential area of Hörnle with about 1600 inhabitants. The furrow formed by the Strenzelbach cuts short a loop of the Murr, which flows into the Neckar just north of the town, and forms an important traffic axis for Marbach and the surrounding area.

=== Districts and exclaves ===
In addition to the immediate surroundings of the Inner City, the urban area includes a narrow strip extending southwest along the Neckar River and incorporating the Marbach power plant.

Furthermore, three exclaves belong to the urban area. Two of them are the districts of Rielingshausen and Siegelhausen, both of which are spatially separated from Marbach. While the area of the core town itself is almost free of forest, the largest part of the forest area of Marbach comprises the uninhabited exclave in the Hardtwald to the north-east of the district of Rielingshausen, which is assigned to the Schwäbisch-Fränkische Waldberge natural area.

Rielingshausen, with about 2800 inhabitants, is located about five kilometres northeast of Marbach on a hill between the Murr and the Hardtwald. The hamlet of Hinterbirkenhof, one and a half kilometres to the north, also belongs to the village. The district is divided by several stream valleys, all of which lead to the Murr. The village centre lies in the shallow hollow of the Weidenbach, while the Kaisersbach forms a depression between Rielingshausen and Hinterbirkenhof. The eastern boundary of the village is formed by the Eichbach, which disappears halfway through in a sinkhole. The Sulzbach flows through a wide valley southeast of the village. After being straightened during the land consolidation in the 1970s, it was renaturalised at the end of the 1980s. This measure was awarded the cultural landscape prize of the Swabian Heritage Society in 1991.

Siegelhausen, a small hamlet with about 30 inhabitants, is located about five kilometres southeast of the core town off the road between Affalterbach and Hochdorf in the valley of the Strombach, which is also called the Apfelbach.

== History ==
Marbach am Neckar was founded by the Franks in the 8th century AD between the Duchies of Swabia and Franconia and the Prince-Bishoprics of Speyer and Constance. Marbach received its town rights in 1009 from Walter Marktrecht, Bishop of Speyer. Around the mid-13th century, those rights were reaffirmed by the Dukes of Teck. In 1302, the Dukes of Teck sold Marbach to the County of Württemberg, who made the city the seat of its own administrative district later in the 14th century and then an Oberamt, Oberamt Marbach, in 1758. That Oberamt was dramatically enlarged on 18 March 1806, but then dissolved entirely in 1938. Marbach was subsequently assigned to a new district, Landkreis Ludwigsburg. On 1 July 1972, Marbach incorporated the town of Rielingshausen.

== Geography ==
The city (Stadt) of Marbach am Neckar covers 18.06 square kilometers (6.97 sq mi) of the district of Ludwigsburg in a total of four separate exclaves. Marbach is, according to government urban planning, part of the Stuttgart Metropolitan Region. Marbach's municipal areas are physically located in the basin of the Neckar, with the exception of its easternmost exclave, which lies in the Swabian-Franconian Forest. The lowest elevation above sea level in the municipal area, 190 meters (620 ft) Normalnull (NN), is found where the Neckar flows out of Marbach and into Benningen am Neckar. The highest elevation, 355 meters (1,165 ft), is found in the east, at the top of the Bülzberg.

== Politics ==
Marbach has two boroughs (Ortsteile) – Marbach am Neckar and Rielingshausen – and three villages: Hinterbirkenhof, Hörnle, Siegelhausen. Also in Marbach's municipal area are the minor administrative units of Dampfkraftwerk, Eichgraben, and Häldenmühle, and the abandoned villages of Hegnachsiedel, Kaisersberg, and Sigebotesbuch.

=== Sister cities ===
Marbach am Neckar is twinned with:

- L'Isle-Adam, Val-d'Oise, France, since 1987
- Washington, Missouri, United States, since 1990
- Tongling, Anhui, People's Republic of China, since 2005

=== Coat of arms ===

Marbach am Neckar's coat of arms displays its field, gold in color, as divided party per pale into halves. The left half has three black stag antlers, taken from the arms of Württemberg. The right half has a crenelated, white tower wrapped with green vines growing two clusters of blue grapes. The placement of Württemberg's arms is derived from town seals in since Württemberg's purchase of the city in 1302, when their arms replaced those of the Dukes of Teck. The tower first appeared around 1547 as a reference to local viticulture. The current coat of arms was devised in 1938 from a 1593 town seal. Marbach has had a municipal flag since 1871.

== Notable people ==
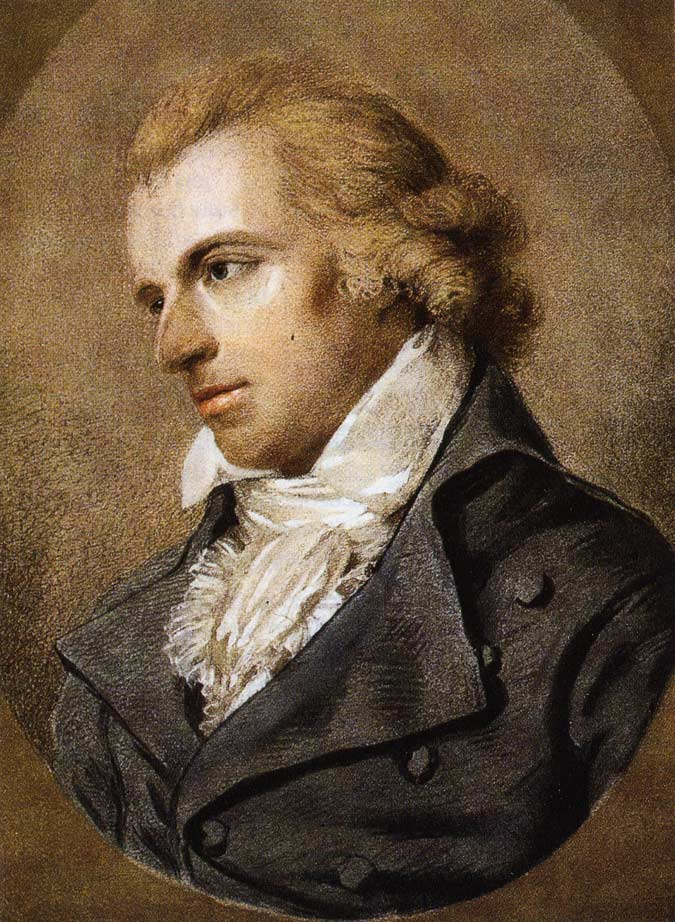
Friedrich Schiller, 1793

- Tobias Mayer (1723–1762), an astronomer famous for his studies of the Moon
- Elisabetha Dorothea Schiller (1732–1802), an innkeeper's daughter, mother of Friedrich Schiller
- Christophine Reinwald (1757–1847), an artist, the eldest sister of Friedrich Schiller
- Friedrich Schiller (1759–1805) a playwright, poet, and philosopher
- Kurt Pinthus (1886–1975), an author, journalist, critic and commentator; lived in Marburg at the end of his life
- Eberhard Kautter (1890–unknown), naval and Freikorps officer
- Fritz Aldinger (born 1941), a materials scientist.
- Cornelia Kallisch (born 1956), an operatic mezzo-soprano

=== Sport ===
- Rolf Geiger (born 1934), a former footballer with 245 club caps and 8 for Germany
- Sascha Maier (born 1974), a former footballer with 371 club caps
- Jörg Bergen (born 1966) a football manager and former player with 330 club caps

== See also ==
- Museum of Modern Literature
