= What Is, and to What End do We Study, Universal History? =

Friedrich Schiller's 1789 inaugural lecture on philosophy of history

What Is, and to What End do We Study, Universal History? (German: Was heißt und zu welchem Ende studiert man Universalgeschichte?) is an inaugural academic lecture delivered by German playwright, poet, and philosopher Friedrich Schiller on 26 May 1789 at the University of Jena. The lecture was published in November 1789 in Christoph Martin Wieland's journal Der teutsche Merkur, appearing in print shortly after the outbreak of the French Revolution. The work marked Schiller's appointment as professor of History and Philosophy and represents one of the most significant contributions to philosophy of history during the German Enlightenment.

== Background ==
Schiller delivered this lecture just weeks before the outbreak of the French Revolution, at a time when Enlightenment ideals about human progress, reason, and education were at their height. Having secured his first stable academic position after years of financial uncertainty, Schiller used the occasion to articulate his vision of historical study as both an intellectual discipline and a moral enterprise.

The lecture was published in November 1789 in Christoph Martin Wieland's journal Der teutsche Merkur, ensuring its wide circulation among German intellectuals.

== Central Arguments ==
=== The Philosophical Mind vs. the Bread-Scholar ===
Schiller opens the lecture by distinguishing between two types of students: the "bread-scholar" (Brotgelehrter) who studies merely for practical advantage and career advancement, and the "philosophical mind" (philosophischer Kopf) who seeks knowledge for its own sake and for human betterment. He argues that only the philosophical mind can truly benefit from the study of universal history.

=== Universal History as Moral Education ===
For Schiller, universal history is not merely a collection of facts but an instrument of human development. As he states in the lecture: "History is a fertile and far-reaching field—in it lies the entire moral life of humanity. It follows us through every state mankind has ever experienced: through error and enlightenment, setbacks and progress, evolving opinions and changing times."

=== The Progress of Civilization ===
Schiller presents a teleological view of history, tracing human development from primitive societies to modern European civilization. He describes how "The discoveries made by our European seafarers in distant seas and on remote shores offer us a spectacle that is as instructive as it is fascinating. They show us peoples at various stages of cultural development, scattered about us like children of different ages gathered around an adult—reminding him, by their example, of what he once was and from whence he came."

=== History as Chain of Causation ===
The lecture emphasizes the interconnectedness of historical events. Schiller argues that "there is thus a long chain of events pulling us from the present moment aloft toward the beginning of the human species, the which intertwine as cause and effect. Only the infinite understanding can survey these events wholly and completely." This causal understanding allows the historian to work backwards from the present to understand how current conditions came to be.

=== The Role of Philosophy in History ===
Schiller acknowledges the limitations of historical sources but argues that "philosophy enters. By connecting the fragments through intelligent reasoning, it transforms the partial into a system—a thoughtful and rational whole." This philosophical approach allows historians to discern patterns and meaning even where documentary evidence is incomplete.

== Significance and Influence ==
The lecture represents a key moment in the development of German historicism and philosophy of history. Schiller's emphasis on history as moral education influenced later German thinkers and contributed to the tradition of viewing historical study as essential to human Bildung (cultural formation).

The work reflects Enlightenment optimism about human progress while acknowledging the complexities and limitations of historical knowledge. Schiller's vision of the "philosophical mind" engaging with universal history to understand humanity's development resonated with the broader Enlightenment project of using reason to improve human conditions.

== Critical reception ==
Contemporary reception was largely positive, with the lecture being seen as a worthy inaugural address from one of Germany's leading literary figures transitioning to academic life. The publication in Wieland's Teutscher Merkur ensured it reached a wide intellectual audience.

Modern scholars have noted both the lecture's Enlightenment idealism and its Eurocentric perspective typical of 18th-century thought. While Schiller's progressive vision of history has been challenged by subsequent historical experiences, his emphasis on history's moral and educational dimensions continues to influence discussions about the purpose of historical study.

== Modern Editions ==
The lecture was translated into English and published as What Is Universal History? in 2025, edited by Jean Delaube.

== See also ==
- Friedrich Schiller
- Philosophy of history
- German Enlightenment
- University of Jena
- Historicism
