= Das verschleierte Bild zu Sais =

"The Veiled Image at Sais" ("Das verschleierte Bild zu Saïs") is a 1795 ballad by Friedrich Schiller using ancient Greek, Egyptian and biblical motifs.

== Development history ==
Schiller refers with his ballad to the motif of the veiled Isis, a very popular theme in artistic as well as intellectual contexts at that time. Furthermore, in the context of contemporary Freemasonry this motif has great significance and thus Schiller already takes it up in his essay Die Sendung Moses (1790), which is strongly inspired by the Freemason Karl Leonard Reinhold. Then he also takes up the motif in his writing Vom Erhabenen (1793). This a philosophical work theorizing the sublime and it is inspired by Immanuel Kant, who used the veiled Isis of Sais as prime example for the sublime. Schiller's ballad is based on Plutarch's written record about a statue of Athena-Isis in the Egyptian city of Sais, in which Plutarch states the statue bore an inscription saying "I am all that has been and is and shall be; and no mortal has ever lifted my veil." A further basis is an anecdote of Pausanias, which is about a young man going mad by illegally opening the holy chest of a mystery cult. Both fundamental story elements, the veiled Isis as well as the mental disease from the illegal view of the holy mysteries, are already treated in Die Sendung Moses.

== Literature ==
Primary literature

- Friedrich Schiller: Sämtliche Werke. Bd. 1. München 1962. pp. 224–226, 239–240.

Secondary literature

- Jan Assmann: Das verschleierte Bild zu Sais. Schillers Ballade und ihre ägyptischen und griechischen Hintergründe. Leipzig 1999.
- George Cebadal: Goethe, Schiller und die verschleierte Wahrheit. Ein kleiner Beitrag zur Mysterienkultur in Goethes "Faust"-Dichtung und der Weimarer Klassik. Norderstedt 2019.
