= Fritz Aldinger =

German materials scientist (born 1941)

Fritz Aldinger (born 30 April 1941 in Marbach am Neckar) is a German materials scientist.

== Life ==
Fritz Aldinger was born in Marbach am Neckar, Baden-Württemberg in 1941. He received his Abitur at the Justinus Kerner Gymnasium in Heilbronn. In 1961 he began study at the University of Stuttgart in chemistry, but later switched to metallurgy. The then-Chair of Physical Metallurgy, Werner Köster, was also director of the Max Planck Institute for Metals Research. The work for both his undergraduate thesis and his dissertation was carried out in the laboratories of the Max Planck Institute for Metals Research. He received his doctorate in 1967 at the University of Stuttgart with the dissertation "On the structure of the four-component system silver-copper-zinc-cadmium."

From 1967 to 1978, Aldinger was a research associate at the Max Planck Institute for Metals Research, where he led the Powder Metallurgical Laboratory (PML). From 1978 to 1985 he worked as head of the metals division at the W.C. Heraeus GmbH in Hanau. In 1985 Aldinger he became the director of the Central Research at Hoechst AG. From 1992 until his retirement, he was both the director at the Max Planck Institute for Metals Research as well as full Professor of "Nonmetallic Inorganic Materials" at the University of Stuttgart.

Aldinger was interested in numerous research topics; he has "developed fundamental contributions to the calculation of phase relations in higher multi-component systems, and so contributed to the breakthrough of their computer-based, computational detection." In addition, he succeeded in his time at the PML to explain deformation anomalies in beryllium. His publication list includes over 600 titles and more than 50 basic patents and patent holdings. He also made extensive research that found worldwide attention to the field of precursor ceramics, in which he was able to establish significant correlations between the structure of the molecular precursors used and the resulting ceramic materials.

The Institute for Scientific Information's "Highly Cited" database lists him among the 250 materials scientists whose work is the most cited worldwide.

== Positions and awards ==
- Speaker of the DFG priority program "Precursor ceramics"
- Director of the research program "Ceramics Superplasticity" of the Japan Science and Technology Corporation and the Max Planck Society
- Tesla medal of the Serbian Academy of Sciences
- Skaupy Prize at the Hagener Symposium of the Fachverband Pulvermetallurgie, November 12, 1997
- Fellow of the World Academy of Ceramics
- Full member of the International Institute for the Science of Sintering
