= Der Teutsche Merkur =

German literary magazine

Der Teutsche Merkur (English: The German Mercury) was a literary magazine published and edited by Christoph Martin Wieland. The magazine was modeled on French magazine, Mercure de France. The first issue appeared in 1773. Wieland published and edited the magazine until 1790. He used the Merkur as an organ to advance the Enlightenment and to provide a platform to support literary taste. Its first period lasted until 1789. In 1790, the title was changed to Der Neue Teutsche Merkur and continued publication until 1810.

== Notable publications ==
The Teutsche Merkur served as an important forum for German Enlightenment discourse and documented contemporary responses to the French Revolution. Notable publications included Wieland's The Secret of the Order of Cosmopolitans (1788), a programmatic text on cosmopolitanism published one year before the Revolution, and Friedrich Schiller's inaugural lecture What Is and to What End do We Study Universal History? (November 1789), published shortly after the French Revolution began.
