= Statue of Friedrich Schiller (Chicago) =

Statue in Chicago, Illinois, U.S.

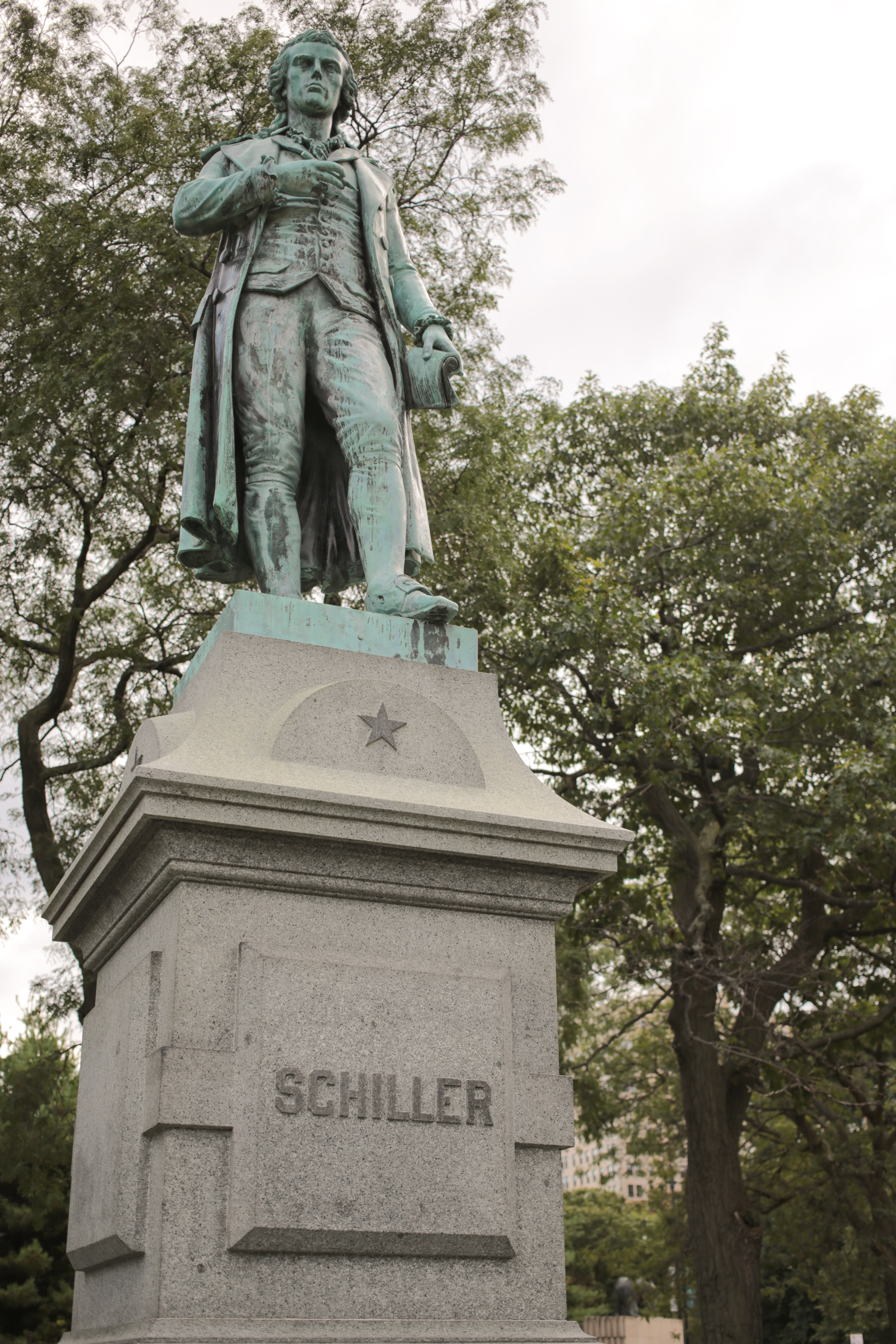
- The statue in 2013
- Artist: Ernst Rau (1839–1875)
- Subject: Friedrich Schiller
- Location: Chicago, Illinois, U.S.; 41°55′19.3″N 87°38′6.7″W

A statue of Friedrich Schiller, sometimes called the Friedrich Schiller Monument, is installed in Chicago's Lincoln Park, in the U.S. state of Illinois. The statue was created by German sculptor Ernst Rau (1839–1875).
