= Ludovike Simanowiz =

German artist (1759–1827)

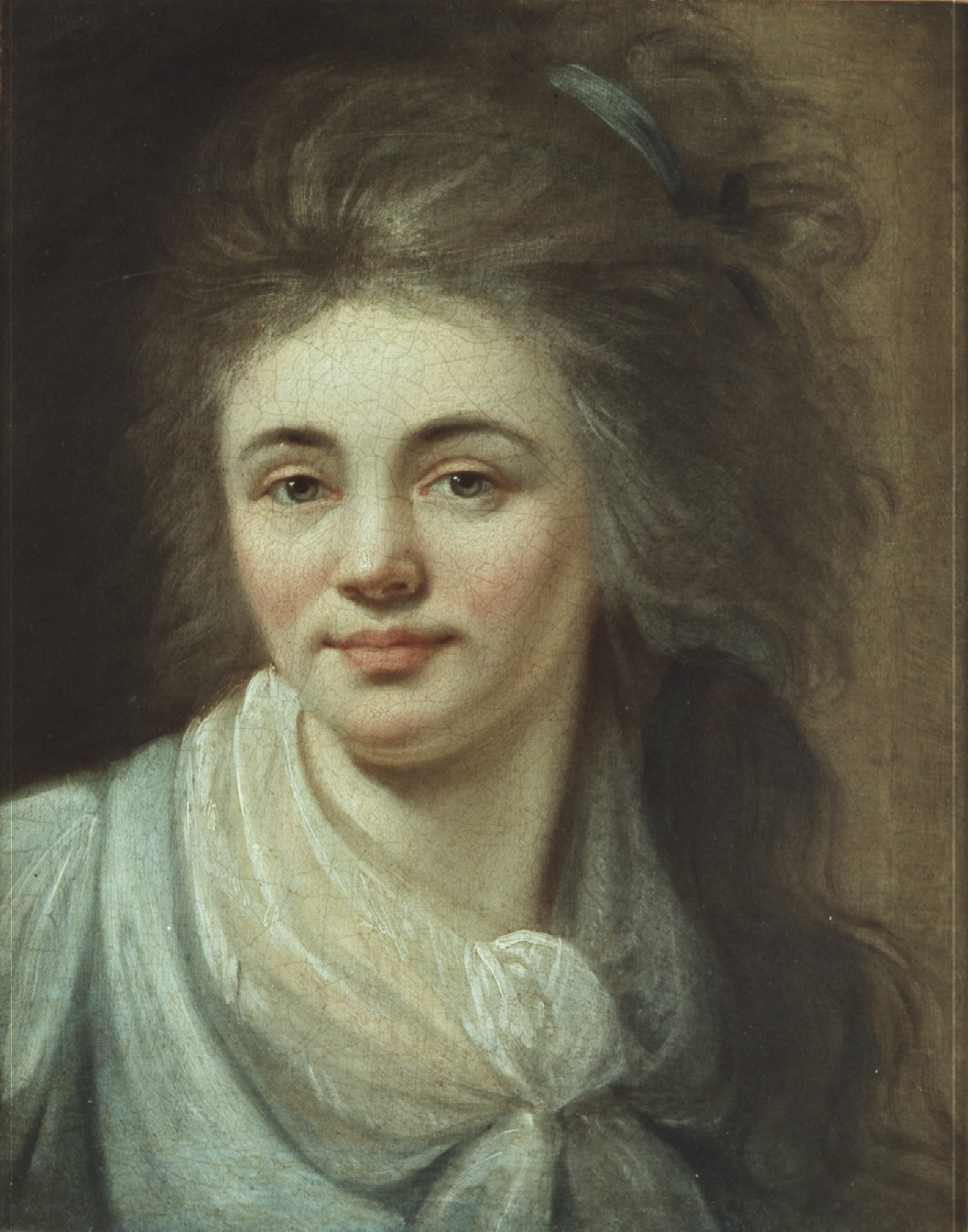
Self-portrait with Billowing Hair (1791)

Kunigunde Sophie Ludovike Simanowiz (née Reichenbach; February 21, 1759, Schorndorf - September 3, 1827, Ludwigsburg) was a German portrait painter in the Classical style.

== Biography ==
Her father was a military feldsher and her mother was the daughter of a pharmacist. She was born in the barracks where her father was employed. In 1762, her family moved to Ludwigsburg, where she grew up with Friedrich Schiller and his sisters. Christophine, who was the first to recognize Friedrich's talent, became her life-long friend.

Her family appreciated her artistic talent and made every effort to promote her career. The Ducal Academy in Ludwigsburg and the Hohe Karlsschule in Stuttgart would not admit women but, in 1776, a professor at the Karlsschule, Nicolas Guibal, agreed to give her private lessons.

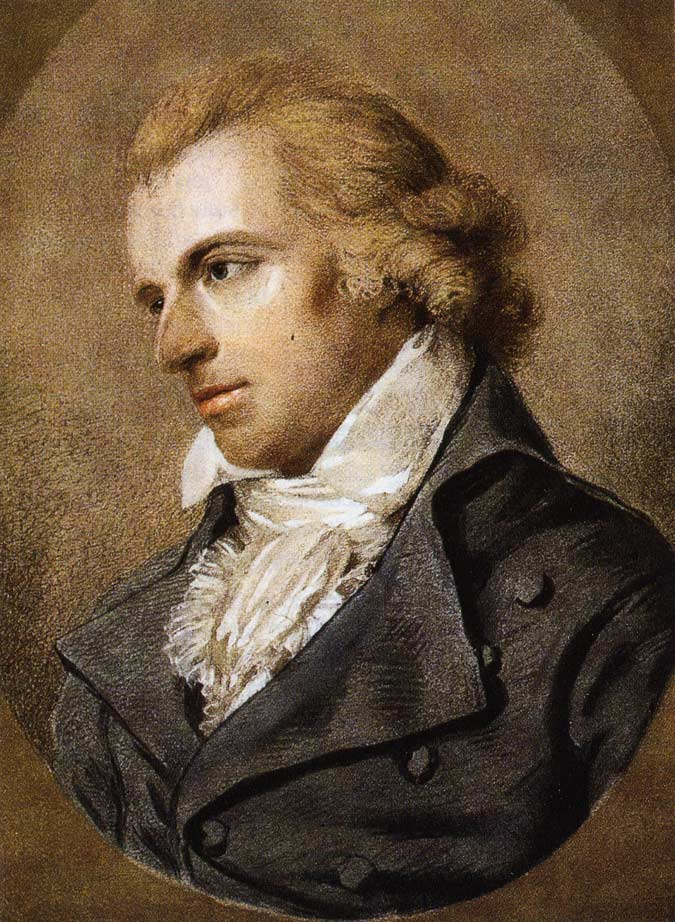
Portrait of Friedrich Schiller

In 1787, with the financial support of Duke Carl Eugen and his mistress, Franziska von Hohenheim, she was able to travel to Paris and study with the miniaturist, Antoine Vestier. She remained for almost two years, then received a commission to paint portraits for Duke Friedrich Eugen, Carl's brother, in Mömpelgard (now Montbéliard). These portraits were never completed, however, as she returned to Stuttgart in 1789 to marry Lieutenant Franz Simanowiz, an old classmate of Schiller's, who had been her fiancé since 1786.

Her letters from that time indicate that she missed Paris and, despite the unsettled conditions arising from the Revolution, she took the opportunity to return when her husband was called off on a troop deployment. Once there, she was able to stay with an old friend from Stuttgart, the opera singer, Helena Balletti, who had since married a marquis.

In 1792, her situation became precarious when her hosts were subjected to searches by monarchist sympathizers and were forced to flee to the marquis' estate in Spain. Simanowiz remained behind, was interrogated, and denied a passport to go home. Early in 1793, her friend helped her escape to Normandy where she was given a passport. When she arrived in Strasbourg, she was seriously ill and spent six weeks in bed, tended by friends.

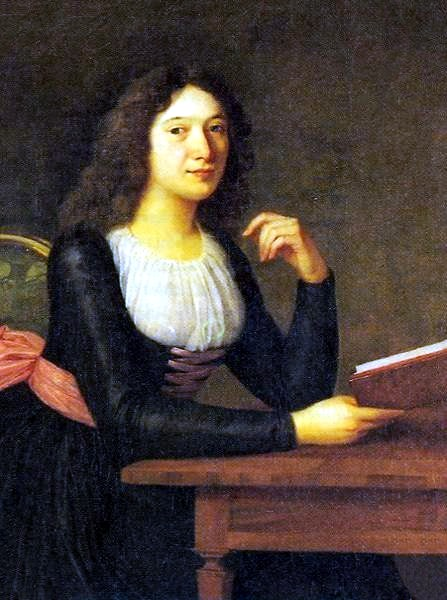
Portrait of Charlotte Schiller

When she finally got back to Ludwigsburg, she began by painting portraits of the Schiller family. Her portraits of Friedrich and his wife Charlotte were done while he was spending some time at home to work on Wallenstein.

In 1798 her husband, now a captain, was transferred to Stuttgart and she joined him there. The following year, he suffered a stroke that paralyzed his legs. She would be his nurse for the next twenty-eight years. In 1812, they returned to Ludwigsburg. Her eldest brother, Friedrich, was a pastor in nearby Erdmannhausen and they would often attend political meetings there to express solidarity with those who were fighting Napoleon.

Franz died in June 1827 and she followed a few months later. She completed approximately 100 portraits (none signed), most of which are in private collections. There is a memorial to her in the Municipal Museum of Schorndorf. One of her nephews was the well-known scientist, Carl Reichenbach.
