= Jörg Bergen =

German footballer and manager

Personal information
- Full name: Jörg Bergen
- Date of birth: 27 June 1966 (age 60)
- Place of birth: Marbach am Neckar, West Germany
- Height: 1.84 m (6 ft 0 in)
- Position: Defender

Team information
- Current team: TSV Ottobrunn (manager)

Youth career
- 1970–1977: TV Pflugfelden
- 1977–1981: FV Markgröningen
- 1981–1984: Stuttgarter Kickers

Senior career*
| Years | Team | Apps | (Gls) |
| 1984–1987 | Stuttgarter Kickers (A) | | |
| 1987–1991 | FC Marbach | 27 | (6) |
| 1991–2001 | SpVgg Unterhaching | 251 | (37) |
| 2001–2003 | FC Bayern Munich (A) | 22 | (1) |
| 2003–2004 | TSV Dorfen | | |
| 2005–2007 | SpVgg Unterhaching II | 30 | (2) |
| 2007–2008 | TuS Holzkirchen | | |

Managerial career
- 2006–2007: SpVgg Unterhaching II (assistant)
- 2008–: TSV Ottobrunn
- * Club domestic league appearances and goals

Jörg Bergen (born 27 June 1966, in Marbach am Neckar) is a German football manager and former player.

Bergen made 24 Bundesliga appearances for SpVgg Unterhaching during his playing career.
