= Elisabetha Dorothea Schiller =

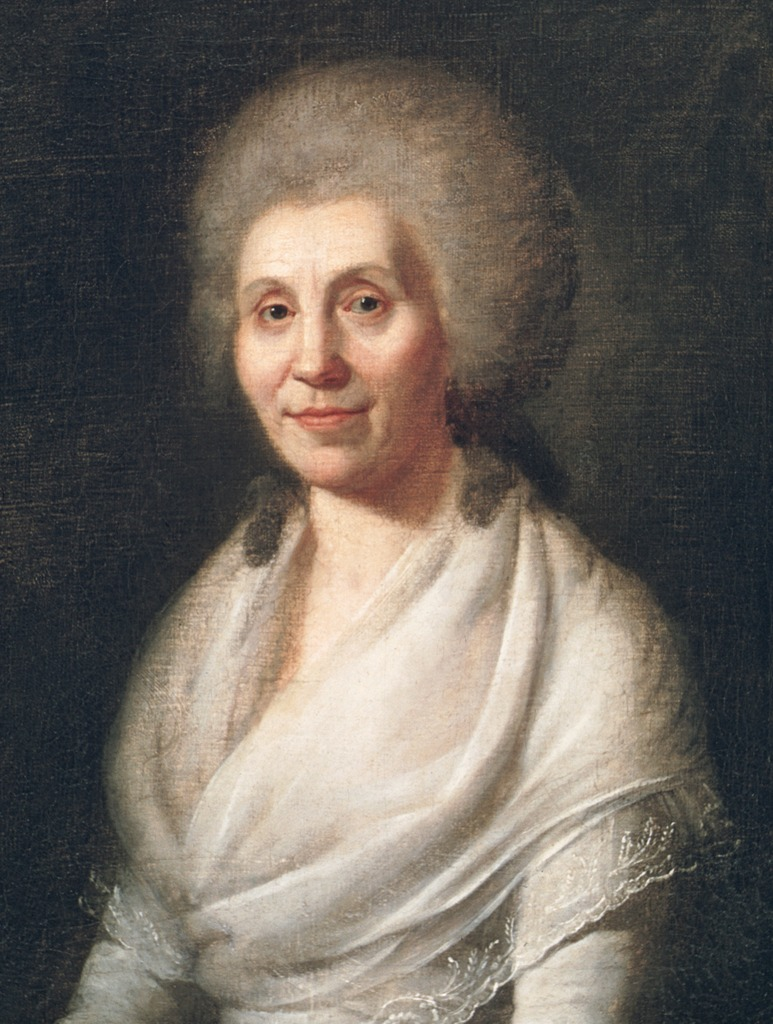
Elisabetha Dorothea Schiller by Ludovike Simanowiz.

Elisabetha Dorothea Schiller (née Kodweiß; 13 December 1732 – 29 April 1802) was a German innkeeper's daughter, notable as the mother of the playwright Friedrich Schiller.

== Life ==
She was born in the small town of Marbach am Neckar to innkeeper Georg Friedrich Kodweiß (1698–1771) and his wife Anna Maria Munz (1698–1773). Anna was a farmer's daughter from the Röhracher Hof in Rietenau, whilst Georg was from a respectable family which had in earlier times had also managed the town's mayor's office. He acquired a certain wealth as innkeeper of the "Goldenen Löwen" in Marbach and had learned the trade of baking.

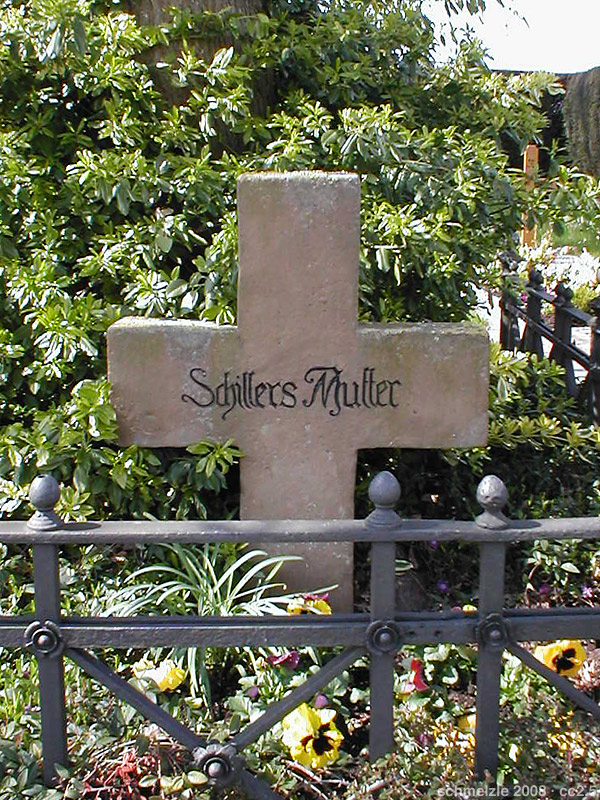
Grave with Mörike's inscription

She died in Cleversulzbach, now part of Neuenstadt am Kocher.

== Bibliography ==
- (in German) Rudolf Schwan: Die Frau Majorin. Schillers Mutter in Cleversulzbach. Betulius, Stuttgart / Mörike-Museum Cleversulzbach, Cleversulzbach 2007, ISBN 978-3-89511-102-0
