= Wallenstein (trilogy of plays) =

Trilogy of dramas by Friedrich Schiller

Wallenstein is the popular designation of a trilogy of dramas by German author Friedrich Schiller. It consists of the plays Wallenstein's Camp (Wallensteins Lager), a lengthy prologue, The Piccolomini (Die Piccolomini), and Wallenstein's Death (Wallensteins Tod). Schiller himself also structured the trilogy into two parts, with Wallenstein I including Wallenstein's Camp and The Piccolomini, and Wallenstein II consisting of Wallenstein's Death. He completed the trilogy in 1799.

In this drama, Schiller addresses the decline of the famous general Albrecht von Wallenstein, basing it loosely on actual historical events during the Thirty Years' War. Wallenstein fails at the height of his power as the successful commander-in-chief of the imperial army when he begins to rebel against his emperor, Ferdinand II. The action is set some 16 years after the start of the war, in the winter of 1633/1634, and begins in the Bohemian city of Pilsen, where Wallenstein is based with his troops. In the second and third acts of the third play the action moves to Eger, where Wallenstein has fled and where he was assassinated on 26 February 1634.

== Content summary ==
=== Wallenstein's Camp ===
Serving as an introduction to the second and third parts, Wallenstein's Camp is by far the shortest of the three. Whilst the main action takes place among the higher ranks of the troops and nobility, Wallenstein's Camp reflects popular opinion, particularly that of the soldiers in Wallenstein's camp. They are enthusiastic about their commander, who to all appearances has managed to bring together mercenaries from a wide variety of locations. They praise the great freedom he allows them—to plunder, for instance—whenever they are not engaged in fighting, and his efforts on their behalf in negotiations with the Holy Roman Emperor, of whom some of the troops are critical. They also praise the war for improving their own lives despite its toll on the civilian population. Still, we hear a peasant complain that the troops steal from him, and a monk criticize their wicked life. At the end of this part, the soldiers find out that the emperor intends to place a section of the army under the command of Spanish Habsburgs. Unhappy, they agree to ask Max Piccolomini, one of their commanders, to urge Wallenstein not to fulfill the emperor's wishes.

The Capuchin's sermon in Wallenstein's Camp is based on the Discalced Augustinian Abraham a Sancta Clara's 1683 book, Auf, auf, ihr Christen. Schiller, who like Abraham was from Swabia, wrote to Goethe, "This Father Abraham is a man of wonderful originality, whom we must respect, and it would be an interesting, though not at all an easy, task to approach or surpass him in mad wit and cleverness."

Some scenes in Giuseppe Verdi's opera La forza del destino are based on the play.

=== The Piccolomini ===
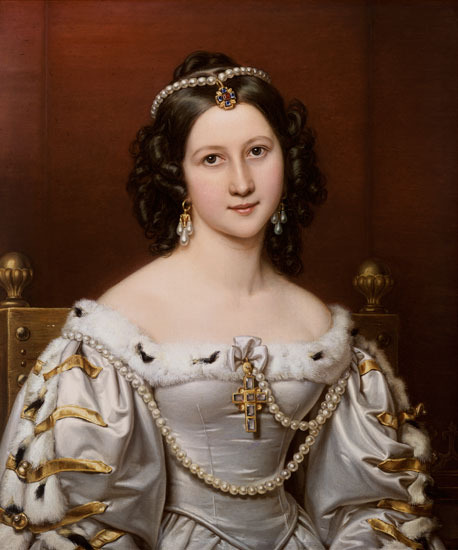
Charlotte von Hagn as Thekla, 1828

The main action of the trilogy begins with the second play. The viewpoint changes from that of the ordinary soldiers to that of the commanders who, awaiting orders, meet in an encampment near Pilsen. Most of them prefer Prince Wallenstein to the emperor. The former has repeatedly ignored the latter's orders, which is why he has ordered the prince to cede part of his huge army. Unwilling, Wallenstein considers resignation and, to pressure the emperor into making peace, is secretly negotiating with the Swedish enemy. Spurring him on are his closest comrades, his brother-in-law Terzky and Illo, who scheme to get all the commanders to sign a document pledging their loyalty to Wallenstein. This document purports to have a proviso making the signatories' loyalty to Wallenstein subsidiary to their loyalty to the emperor, but Terzky and Illo secretly remove that proviso from the copy the signatories actually sign.

Wallenstein lets his comrades in on his plans but – unknown to him – one of them, Octavio Piccolomini, remains loyal to the emperor, for whom he is spying. The emperor has authorised Piccolomini to replace Wallenstein as commander-in-chief, but Piccolomini decides to do so only if Wallenstein takes an open stand against the emperor. Imperial informers having managed to capture one of Wallenstein's negotiators en route to the Swedes, his removal becomes imminent. The situation comes to a head because Octavio's son Max Piccolomini and Wallenstein's daughter Thekla (both fictional creations by Schiller) are in love. A devotee of Wallenstein, who treats him well, Max can't believe his father's claim that Wallenstein intends to betray the emperor. "Piccolomini" ends with Max's decision to challenge Wallenstein directly about his plans.

=== Wallenstein's Death ===
In the last part of the Wallenstein trilogy the conflict anticipated in the second play erupts and leads to a tragic conclusion. Having learned that the negotiators he has sent to bargain with the Swedes have been intercepted by imperial troops, Wallenstein supposes that the emperor now has damning evidence of his treason. After some hesitation and intense pressure exerted by Illo, Terzky and especially the latter's spouse, Countess Terzky, Wallenstein decides to burn his bridges: he will enter into official alliance with the Swedes.

But there is opposition. Octavio Piccolomini, the emperor's spy, manages to persuade almost all the important leaders in Wallenstein's army—especially Butler—to abandon him. Convinced that Wallenstein has thwarted his ambitions, Butler hangs on for the sake of revenge. Max Piccolomini, for his part, is torn between his loyalty to the emperor, his admiration for Wallenstein, and his love for Thekla. He finally decides to leave Wallenstein, hoping there will be no hard feelings, but for the prince it's the final straw. He then flees with his remaining supporters to Eger; Max Piccolomini throws himself into a doomed battle with the Swedes, which costs him his life. When Thekla learns of this, she secretly sets out for his grave, there to die. Wallenstein also grieves about the loss of Max Piccolomini, but believes that the fates have taken him away in compensation for future good fortune.

In the night, Butler's henchmen, Macdonald and Deveroux, murder Illo and Terzky during a banquet, then kill Wallenstein himself in his bedroom. The drama ends with a final dialogue between Octavio and his chief antagonist, Countess Terzky, who dies of the poison she has taken. Finally, Octavio hears that the emperor, in gratitude, has promoted him to the rank of prince.

== Productions ==
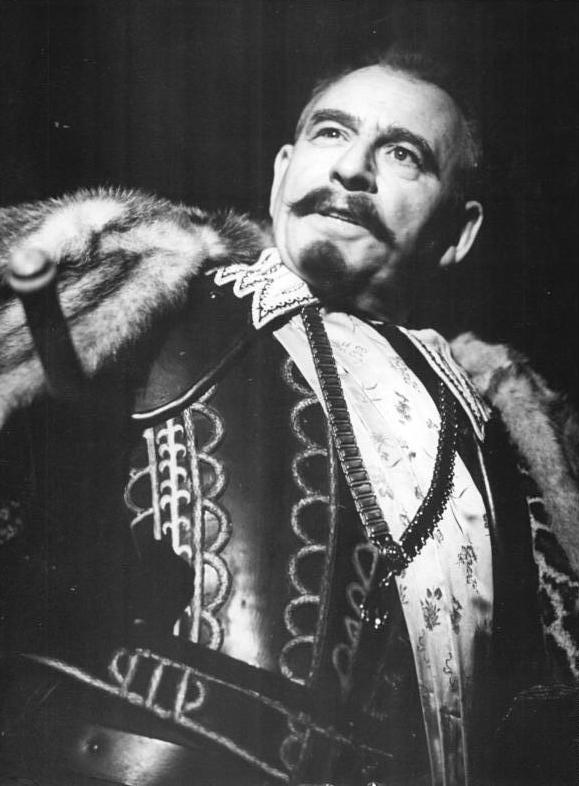
Wolfgang Heinz as Wallenstein, 1962, at the Deutsches Theater Berlin, directed by Karl Paryla

The plays' premieres occurred at the Weimarer Hoftheater (now the Deutsches Nationaltheater Weimar) from 1798 to 1799, in productions directed by Johann Wolfgang von Goethe:

- Wallensteins Lager, 12 October 1798 (under the title Das Lager, for the re-opening of the rebuilt Weimarer Hoftheater)
- Die Piccolomini, 30 January 1799
- Wallensteins Tod, 20 April 1799 (under the title Wallenstein)

Often reduced into a single play that could be played in one evening, the trilogy entered the German classical theatrical repertoire. Among its recent nationally acclaimed productions have been:

- 1959: Deutsches Theater Berlin, Director: Karl Paryla
- 1959: Burgtheater, Director: Leopold Lindtberg. – Recorded for radio in 1960 by NDR and ORF for broadcast over 7 hours on two evenings and released by Verlag Mnemosyne, in an abbreviated version on 4 CDs in 2004 (Wallenstein. Ein dramatisches Gedicht. – ISBN 3-934012-22-1). The CDs include Die Piccolomini (100 minutes) and Wallensteins Tod (around 130 minutes)
- 1961 Ruhr Festival, Recklinghausen. – 1961 recording by WDR, released on 20 CDs as part of a comprehensive Schiller-Edition in 2005: Friedrich Schiller, Werke. A selection on 20 CDs. Random House Audio, ISBN 3-89830-926-6
- from 1973: Since 1864 a Wallenstein Festival has been held in Altdorf bei Nürnberg in the summer. It was originally put on as a 'spectacle drama' by students and local amateur actors directed by Franz Dittmar. Since 1973 it has only consisted of the Wallenstein trilogy.
- 2005: Wallenstein. Eine dokumentarische Inszenierung by Helgard Haug and Daniel Wetzel (Rimini Protokoll). Production: Nationaltheater Mannheim / Deutsches Nationaltheater Weimar. Toured to (for example) Theatertreffen Berlin, Schauspielhaus Zürich and the Hamburger Autorentheater-Tagen at Thalia-Theater.
- In 2007 Peter Stein staged almost the complete text, with all 11 acts of the trilogy, at the Berliner Ensemble with Klaus Maria Brandauer in the title role, staged in the Kindlhalle, a former brewery in Berlin-Neukölln. Other nationally acclaimed productions that year were that directed by Wolfgang Engel at the Schauspiel Leipzig and Thomas Langhoff's production at the Wiener Burgtheater (with Gert Voss as Wallenstein).

=== English-language productions ===
- A single-play condensed translation by Mike Poulton, directed by Angus Jackson and with Iain Glen in the title role, was staged at the Minerva Theatre in Chichester from 22 May to 13 June 2009.
- A single-play condensed translation by Robert Pinsky, directed by Michael Kahn and with Steve Pickering in the title role, was staged at the Shakespeare Theatre Company in Washington, D.C. from 28 March to 2 June 2013.

== Sources ==
- (in German) Barthold Pelzer, Tragische Nemesis und historischer Sinn in Schillers Wallenstein-Trilogie. Eine rekonstruierende Lektüre; (=Forschungen zur Literatur- und Kulturgeschichte 60); Diss. (TU Berlin), Frankfurt am Main u.a. (Peter Lang) 1997 (ISBN 3-631-31936-3)
- (in German) Bernhardt, Rüdiger: Friedrich Schiller: Wallenstein. Königs Erläuterungen und Materialien (vol. 440). Hollfeld: C. Bange Verlag 2005. ISBN 978-3-8044-1825-7
- (in German) Fritz Heuer und Werner Keller (ed.): Schillers Wallenstein (Wege der Forschung, volume 420), Darmstadt, 1977
- (in German) Elfriede Neubuhr (ed.): Geschichtsdrama. (= Wege der Forschung, volume 485) Darmstadt, 1980
