= Rüdiger Bernhardt =

German germanist and specialist in literature

Rüdiger Bernhardt (born 8 September 1940) is a German Germanist and Scandinavist.

Born in Dresden, Bernhardt was a Germanist at the Martin Luther University of Halle-Wittenberg until 1993. Among other things he dealt with works by Peter Hille, among them with the Seegesicht.

As unofficial collaborator (IME) under the code name "Faust", he provided the Stasi with expert opinions on manuscripts by authors for many years; he thus influenced printing permission procedure of the censorship in East Germany. As a result of an evaluation of a text by Detlef Opitz by the Stasi secret expert, the Opitz text was not printed and led to State reprisals. Bernhardt worked as a Stasi-IM from 1976 to 1989. The files contain 13 typewritten reports, 41 tape copies, 49 oral reports and 60 meeting reports of the agent handling by him. In addition to his expert reports, he reported on the German Studies/Art Studies Section at the University of Halle and on more than 30 persons.

Bernhardt is a member of the Leibniz-Sozietät der Wissenschaften zu Berlin
