= Bittenfeld =

Quarter of Baden-Württemberg, Germany

Coordinates: 48°53′N 9°19′E

Bittenfeld is an incorporated (1975) town located in the northernmost quarter of Waiblingen in the Rems-Murr-Kreis in Baden-Württemberg. Its population is approximately 4,300 inhabitants.

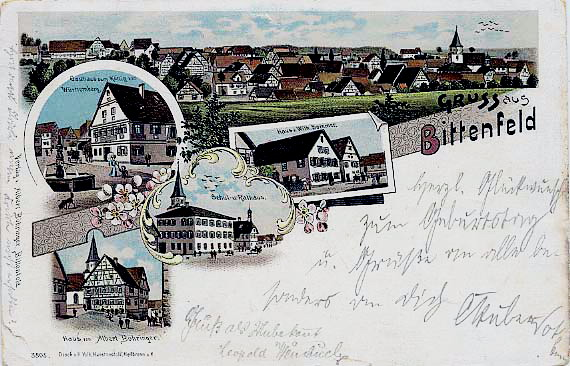
Bittenfeld in 1900
