= Otto Hofner =

Austrian sculptor (1879–1946)

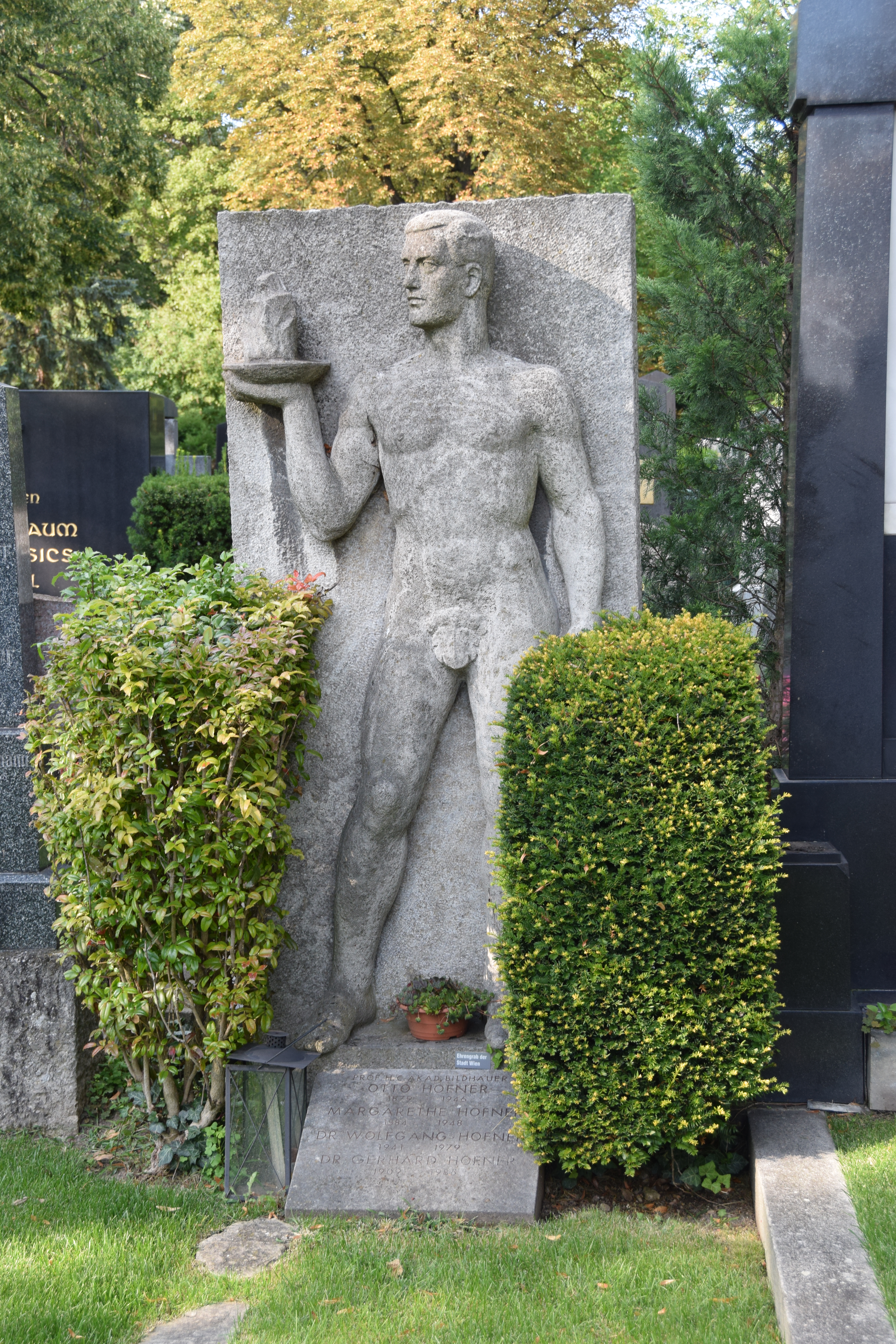
- The grave of Otto Hofner
- Born: 29 March 1879; Vienna, Austria-Hungary
- Died: 13 March 1946 (aged 66); Vienna, Austria
- Occupation: Sculptor

Otto Hofner (29 March 1879 – 13 March 1946) was an Austrian sculptor. His work was part art competitions at the 1932 Summer Olympics, the 1936 Summer Olympics, and the 1948 Summer Olympics.

== Early life and education ==
Otto Hofner began his artistic journey by serving a four-year apprenticeship as a goldsmith, engraver, and chiseller. Furthering his education, Hofner attended the University of Applied Arts Vienna under Stefan Schwartz from 1898. His passion for arts led him to undertake study trips to Paris, Holland, Belgium, and London, enriching his artistic exposure.

== Career and contributions ==
From 1904 to 1915, Hofner dedicated himself to teaching at the cooperative school for gold- and silversmiths in Vienna. During this period, he also worked as an independent artist, deepening his knowledge of sculpture through travels to Paris and London. Hofner was a prolific creator of funerary monuments, busts, portrait reliefs, medals, plaques, and sculptures. His artistic works also included pieces for public spaces and municipal housing during the Red Vienna period (1918–1934), a time when Vienna was predominantly governed by the Social Democrats.

== Olympic Achievements ==
Otto Hofner was notable for his participation in the Olympic Art Competitions. He competed as a three-time Olympian in the Art Competitions from 1932 to 1948. In the 1936 Berlin Olympic Games, he received an Honorable Mention for his work "Ringkampf" (Wrestling Match). His sculpture "Boxer," presented in the 1932 Olympic Games, was later acquired by the Municipal Collections of Vienna in 1935. Hofner's artistic style was influenced by Art Nouveau, and he worked in a variety of media including bronze, marble, granite, pewter, terracotta, stucco, glass, and porcelain.

== Legacy ==
Otto Hofner's work during the Austrian Anschluss to the Third Reich included various busts of Adolf Hitler, showing the political influences of the era on art. After his death on 13 March 1946, he was honoured with a grave in the Hietzing cemetery in Vienna.

His contributions to sculpture — particularly during the early 20th century —reflected a blend of traditional craftsmanship and modern artistic movements. Hofner's works, varying from Olympic sculptures to public monuments, demonstrate a significant part of Austria's artistic heritage during a tumultuous period in European history.
