= Christophine Reinwald =

German artist (1757–1847)

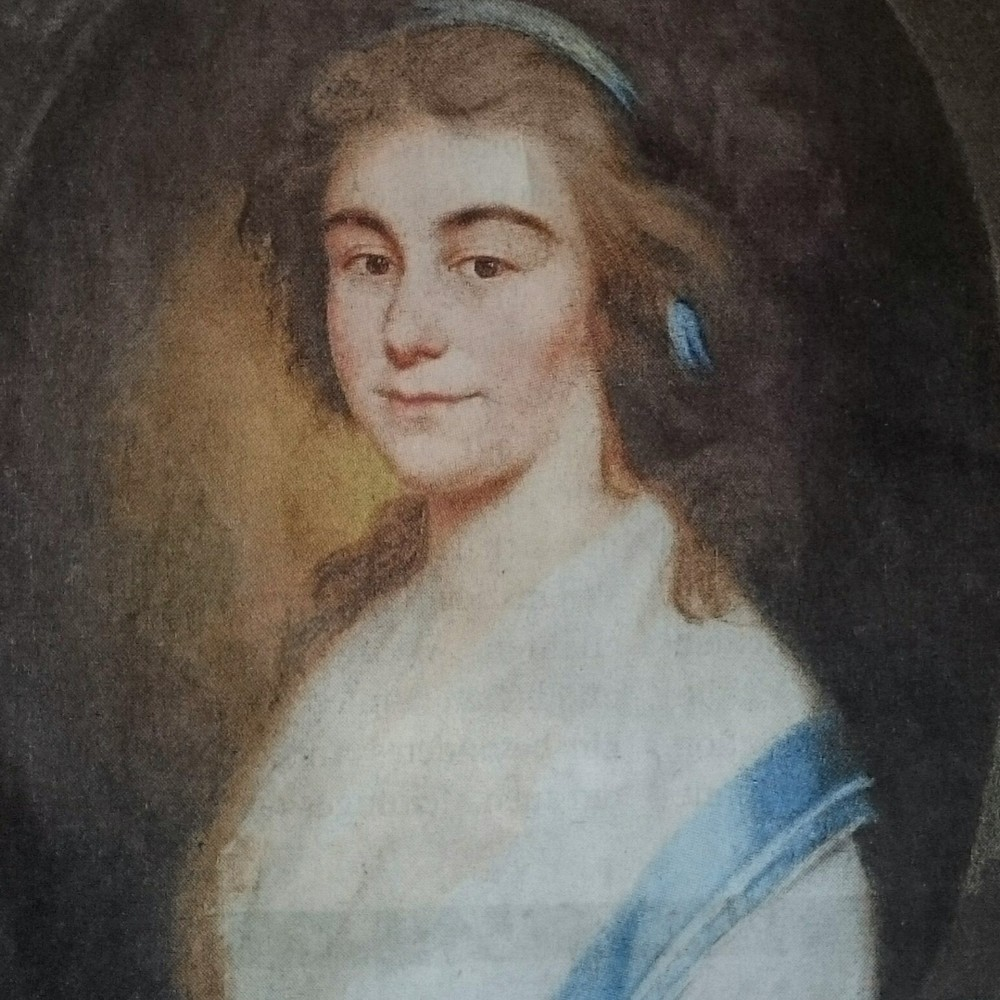
- Born: Elisabetha Christophine Friederike Schiller; 4 September 1757; Marbach am Neckar, Duchy of Württemberg
- Died: 31 August 1847 (aged 89); Meiningen, Kingdom of Württemberg
- Spouse: Wilhelm Friedrich Hermann Reinwald
- Relatives: Friedrich Schiller (brother)

Christophine Reinwald (born Elisabetha Christophine Friederike Schiller; 4 September 1757 – 31 August 1847) was a German artist, the eldest sister of Friedrich Schiller.

Born Elisabetha Christophine Friederike Schiller in Marbach am Neckar, in 1786 in Meiningen. Christophine Reinwald married the librarian Wilhelm Friedrich Hermann Reinwald (1737–1815), who was twenty years older than her. The couple had no children. To obtain extra money for the family, Christophine gave drawing lessons to the daughters of local families. She was also acquainted with the painter Ludovike Simanowiz. She died in Meiningen.
