= List of compositions by Franz Schubert (1813) =

Franz Schubert's compositions of 1813 are mostly in the Deutsch catalogue (D) range D 37A–91, and include:

- Instrumental works:
  - Symphony No. 1, D 82
  - String Quartet No. 4, D 46
  - String Quartet No. 5, D 68
  - String Quartet No. 6, D 74
  - String Quartet No. 10, D 87
- Vocal music:
  - Des Teufels Lustschloß, D 84 (composition started late October 1813)
  - "Trinklied", D 75
  - "Sehnsucht", D 52
  - "Der Taucher", D 77

== Table ==
=== Legend ===
Legend to the table
column		content
1	D '51	Deutsch number in the first version of the Deutsch catalogue (1951)
2	D utd	most recent (utd = up to date) Deutsch catalogue number; the basic collation of the list is according to these numbers – whether or not the possibility to adjust the sorting according to the content of other columns is available depends on the device with which the table is displayed.
3	Op. pbl	Opus number (Op.; p indicates Post. = posthumous) and date of first publication (pbl; between brackets; when there is more than one date the earlier dates indicate partial publications). The column sorts to Opus number, then (earliest of) the publication date(s)
4	AGA	Alte Gesamt-Ausgabe = Franz Schubert's Werke: Kritisch durchgesehene Gesammtausgabe. Indicates genre/instrumentation: Series I: Symphonien (Nos. 1-8) (Johannes Brahms, 1884); Series II: Overtüren und Andere Orchesterwerke (Johann Nepomuk Fuchs, 1886); Series III: Oktette (Nos. 1-3) and IV: Streichquintett (Eusebius Mandyczewski, 1889); Series V: Streichquartette (Nos. 1-15) (Joseph Hellmesberger and Eusebius Mandyczewski, 1890); Series VI: Trio für Streichinstrumente (Eusebius Mandyczewski, 1892); Series VII: Trios, Quartets and Quintets with Piano and VIII: Pianoforte und Ein Instrument (Ignaz Brüll, 1886); Series IX: Pianoforte zu vier Händen (Anton Door, 1888); Series X: Sonaten für Pianoforte (Julius Epstein, 1888); Series XI: Fantasie, Impromptus und andere Stücke für Pianoforte (Julius Epstein, 1888); Series XII: Tänze für Pianoforte (Nos. 1-31) (Julius Epstein, 1889); Series XIII: Messen (Nos. 1-7) (Eusebius Mandyczewski, 1887); Series XIV: Kleinere Kirchenmusikwerke (Nos. 1-22) (Eusebius Mandyczewski, 1888); Series XV: Dramatische Musik (Johann Nepomuk Fuchs, 1893); Series XVI: Werke für Männerchor (Nos. 1-46) (Eusebius Mandyczewski, 1891); Series XVII: Werke für gemischten Chor (Nos. 1-19) (Josef Gänsbacher, Eusebius Mandyczewski, 1892); Series XVIII: Werke für Drei und mehr Frauenstimmen mit Pianoforte-Begleitung (Nos. 1-6) (Josef Gänsbacher, Eusebius Mandyczewski, 1891); Series XIX: Kleine Gesangswerke (Nos. 1-36) (Josef Gänsbacher and Eusebius Mandyczewski, 1892); Series XX: Sämtliche einstimmige Lieder und Gesänge (Eusebius Mandyczewski, 1894-1895); Series XXI: Supplement (Eusebius Mandyczewski, 1897); 1. Instrumentalmusik No. 1-5; 2. Instrumentalmusik No. 6-13; 3. Instrumentalmusik No. 14-; 4. Gesangsmusik; Series XXII: Revisionsbericht
5	NSA	NGA/NSA/NSE = New Schubert Edition, also indicates genre/instrumentation: Series I: Church Music; Series II: Stage Works; Series III: Part Songs; Series IV: Lieder; Series V: Orchestral Works; Series VI: Chamber Music; 1. Octet and Nonet; 2. String Quintet; 3. String Quartets I; 4. String Quartets II; 5. String Quartets III; 6. String Trios; 7. Works for Piano and several instruments; 8. Works for Piano and one instrument; 9. Dances for several instruments; Series VII: Piano Music; 1. Works for Piano Four Hands; 2. Works for Piano Two Hands; Series VIII: Supplement, 2. Schubert's Studies
6	Name	unique name, with, if available, a link to the relevant encyclopedia article; sorts by name with initial definite ("Der", "Die", "Das", ...) or indefinite ("Ein", "A", ...) articles, and numbers, moved after the expression they qualify: e.g. "Die Hoffnung, ..." sorts as "Hoffnung, Die, ..." – "Thirty Minuets ..." sorts as "Minuets, 30, ...".
7	Key / incipit	incipit mostly for songs (linking to lyrics and their translation, for instance at The LiederNet Archive, when available), other compositions by key, except for Schubert's stage works: type of composition in brackets.
8	Date	(presumed) date of composition, or, for copies and arrangements, date of Schubert's autograph. Sorts to earliest possible date of completion, unlike the chronology of the Deutsch catalogue that generally collates according to earliest date associated with the composition: e.g. Schubert started the composition of his 3rd String Quartet on 19 November 1812 and completed it on 21 February 1813 – in the Deutsch catalogue the composition is grouped with other compositions from 1812: when using the sort function of the 8th column the composition is grouped with compositions completed in 1813
9	Additional info	may include: Information about the text (lyrics, libretto) of vocal compositions: e.g., "Text by [text author]", "Text: [standard lyrics]", "... from [literary work]"; "other settings: D ..." indicates Schubert's other settings of the same text; for fields starting with "Text ..." this column sorts by text author (last name, first name—or pen name when such name is more established), then incipit of the lyrics (alternatively, when the incipit is rarely used, title of the work); Information about the authenticity of the composition: the work is without doubt Schubert's unless when marked as "Doubtful", "Spurious?" or "Spurious" (in the last case columns 3–8 give no further information about the composition); Forces needed for performance ("For ..."): may be omitted when the type of composition makes the instrumentation clear (e.g. String Quartet → two violins, viola and cello), and, for vocal music, when the setting is for voice and piano; "s", "a", "t" and "b" refer to a single soprano, alto, tenor and bass singer respectively, while "S", "A", "T" and "B" to choral parts for the same types of singers (see SATB).; Specifications regarding movements (e.g. "Allegro – Minuet – Rondo") or sections (e.g. "No. 1 ..."); Information about the completeness of the extant work: the work is considered complete as extant unless when marked "Sketch", "Incomplete", "Unfinished", "Fragment" or "Lost"; Information about versions (e.g. "Two versions: ...")

=== List ===
Compositions by Franz Schubert listed in the Deutsch catalogue for 1813
D '51	D utd	Op. pbl	AGA	NSA	Name	Key / incipit	Date	Additional info
967	37A			VII/2, 4 Anh. VIII, 2 No. 13	Fugue sketches, D 37A		1813?	For piano
38	38	(1892)	XIX; No. 20	III, 4 No. 1	Totengräberlied, D 38	Grabe, Spaden, grabe!	1813?	Text by Hölty (other setting: D 44); For ttb
39	39	(1969)		IV, 6 Anh No. 2	Lebenstraum	Ich saß an einer Tempelhalle	early 1810?	Text by Baumberg; Sketch; Music related to D 1A
	39A			VI, 9	Three Minuets with Trios, D 39A		1813	For orchestra; Lost
41	41	(1889)	XII; No. 30	VII/2, 6	Thirty Minuets with Trios, D 41	Various keys	1813	For piano; Nos. 1–8, 11–18 and 20–23 are extant
	41A			VII/2, 4 Anh.	Fugue, D 41A	E minor	1813	For piano; Fragment
42	42	(1895) (1969)	XX, 10; No. 570	IV, 6 No. 5 Anh. No. 3	Aria di Timante	Misero pargoletto	1813?	Text by Metastasio, from Demofoonte III, 5; For s and piano; Two settings: 1st, not in AGA, consisting of two variant fragments
43	43	(1897)	XXI, 4 No. 43	III, 4 No. 2 VIII, 2 No. 34	Sprüche des Confucius, D 43	Dreifach ist der Schritt der Zeit	8/7/1813	Text by Schiller (other settings: D 69 and 70); For ttb
44	44	(1894)	XX, 1 No. 7	IV, 6 No. 6	Totengräberlied, D 44	Grabe, Spaden, grabe!	19/1/1813	Text by Hölty (other setting: D 38)
45	45	(1888)	XIV No. 21	I, 5	Kyrie, D 45	B♭ major Kyrie	1/3/1813	Text: Mass ordinary (other settings: D 24E, 31, 49, 56, 66, 105, 167, 324, 452, 678, 755 and 950); For SATB
46	46	(1890)	V No. 4	VI, 3 No. 6	String Quartet No. 4	C major	3/3/1813– 7/3/1813	Adagio – Andante con moto – Minuet – Finale
47	47	(1974)		III, 2b Anh. No. 1	Dithyrambe, D 47	Nimmer, das glaubt mir, erscheinen die Götter	29/3/1813	Text by Schiller (other setting: D 801); For tbSATB and piano; Fragment
48	48	(1871) (1888)	IX, 3 No. 32	VII/1, 1 No. 3	Fantasy, D 48, a.k.a. Grand Sonata	C minor	April 1813– 10/6/1813	For piano duet; AGA includes concluding fugue
49	49	(1888)	XIV No. 15	I, 5	Kyrie, D 49	D minor Kyrie	early April; 1813– 15/4/1813	Text: Mass ordinary (other settings: D 24E, 31, 45, 56, 66, 105, 167, 324, 452, 678, 755 and 950); For satbSATB and orchestra; First part of a Mass
50	50	(1894)	XX, 1 No. 8	IV, 6 No. 7	Die Schatten	Freunde, deren Grüfte sich schon bemoosten!	12/4/1813	Text by Matthisson
51	51	(1897)	XXI, 4 No. 37	III, 4 No. 3	Unendliche Freude, D 51	Unendliche Freude durchwallet das Herz	15/4/1813	Text by Schiller, stanza 3 from "Elysium" (other stanzas and settings: D 53, 54, 57, 58, 60 and 584); For ttb
52	52	(1868)	XX, 1 No. 9	IV, 2b No. 8	Sehnsucht, D 52	Ach, aus dieses Tales Gründen	15/4/1813– 17/4/1813	Text by Schiller (other setting: D 636); For b and piano
53	53	(1892)	XIX; No. 9	III, 4 No. 4	Vorüber die stöhnende Klage	Vorüber die stöhnende Klage!	18/4/1813	Text by Schiller, stanza 1 from "Elysium" (other stanzas and settings: D 51, 54, 57, 58, 60 and 584); For ttb
54	54	(1873)	XIX; No. 22	III, 4 No. 5 VIII, 2 No. 17	Unendliche Freude, D 54	Unendliche Freude durchwallet das Herz	19/4/1813	Text by Schiller, stanza 3 from "Elysium" (other stanzas and settings: D 51, 53, 57, 58, 60 and 584); Canon for three male voices
55	55	(1892)	XIX; No. 12	III, 4 No. 6	Selig durch die Liebe	Selig durch die Liebe Götter	21/4/1813	Text by Schiller, from "Der Triumph der Liebe": stanza 1; Other: D 61, 62, 63, 64, 983A; For ttb
56	56	(1892)	XIX; No. 29	I, 5 VIII, 2 No. 18	Sanctus, D 56	B♭ major Sanctus	21/4/1813	Text: Mass ordinary (other settings: D 24E, 31, 45, 49, 66, 105, 167, 324, 452, 678, 755 and 950); Canon for three voices; Two versions
57	57	(1897)	XXI, 4 No. 38	III, 4 No. 7	Hier strecket der wallende Pilger	Hier strecket der wallende Pilger	29/4/1813	Text by Schiller, stanza 4 from "Elysium" (other stanzas and settings: D 51, 53, 54, 58, 60 and 584); For ttb
58	58	(1892)	XIX; No. 10	III, 4 No. 8	Dessen Fahne Donnerstürme wallte	Dessen Fahne Donnerstürme wallte	May 1813	Text by Schiller, stanza 5 from "Elysium" (other stanzas and settings: D 51, 53, 54, 57, 60 and 584); For ttb
59	59	(1832)	XX, 1 No. 10	IV, 6 No. 8	Verklärung	Lebensfunke, vom Himmel entglüht	4/5/1813	Text by Herder after Pope's "The dying Christian to his soul"
60	60	(1892)	XIX; No. 11	III, 4 No. 16	Hier umarmen sich getreue Gatten	Hier umarmen sich getreue Gatten	3/10/1813	Text by Schiller, stanza 6 from "Elysium" (other stanzas and settings: D 51, 53, 54, 57, 58 and 584); For ttb
61	61	(1897)	XXI, 4 No. 39	III, 4 No. 9 VIII, 2 No. 19	Ein jugendlicher Maienschwung	Ein jugendlicher Maienschwung	8/5/1813	Text by Schiller, from "Der Triumph der Liebe": stanza 9; Other: D 55, 62, 63, 64, 983A; Canon for three voices
62	62	(1897)	XXI, 4 No. 40	III, 4 No. 10; VIII, 2 No. 35	Thronend auf erhabnem Sitz	Thronend auf erhabnem Sitz	9/5/1813	Text by Schiller, from "Der Triumph der Liebe": stanza 15; Other: D 55, 61, 63, 64, 983A
63	63	(1892)	XIX; No. 13	III, 4 No. 11	Wer die steile Sternenbahn	Wer die steile Sternenbahn	10/5/1813	Text by Schiller, from "Der Triumph der Liebe": stanza 26; Other: D 55, 61, 62, 64, 983A; For ttb
64	64	(1897)	XXI, 4 No. 41	III, 4 No. 12; VIII, 2 No. 36	Majestät'sche Sonnenroße	Majestät'sche Sonnenroße	10/5/1813	Text by Schiller, from "Der Triumph der Liebe": stanza 16; Other: D 55, 61, 62, 63, 983A; For ttb
65	65	(1892)	XIX; Anh. I, No. 35	III, 4 Anh. II No. 1 VIII, 2 No. 20	Schmerz verzerret ihr Gesicht	Schmerz verzerret ihr Gesicht	11/5/1813	Text by Schiller, from "Gruppe aus dem Tartarus": stanza 2 (other settings: D 396 and 583); For ttb; Sketch
66	66	(1888)	XIV No. 16	I, 5	Kyrie, D 66	F major Kyrie	12/5/1813	Text: Mass ordinary (other settings: D 24E, 31, 45, 49, 56, 105, 167, 324, 452, 678, 755 and 950); For SATB and orchestra
67	67	(1897)	XXI, 4 No. 42	III, 4 No. 13	Frisch atmet des Morgens lebendiger Hauch	Frisch atmet des Morgens lebendiger Hauch	15/5/1813	Text by Schiller (other setting: D 402); For ttb
68	68	(1890)	V No. 5	VI, 3 No. 7	String Quartet No. 5	B♭ major	8/6/1813– 18/8/1813	Allegro maestoso – Allegro; Middle movements missing
69	69	(1892)	XIX; No. 23	III, 4 No. 14; VIII, 2 No. 21	Sprüche des Confucius, D 69	Dreifach ist der Schritt der Zeit	8/7/1813	Text by Schiller (other settings: D 43 and 70); Canon for three voices
70	70	(1974)		III, 4 Anh. I No. 1 VIII, 2 No. 33	Sprüche des Confucius, D 70	Dreifach ist der Schritt der Zeit	8/7/1813	Text by Schiller (other settings: D 43 and 69); For ttb; Fragment
71	71	(1892)	XIX; No. 14	III, 4 No. 15	Die zwei Tugendwege	Zwei sind der Wege	15/7/1813	Text by Schiller; For ttb
	71A	(1956)		I, 8 VIII, 2 No. 22	Alleluja, D 71A	F major	July 1813?	Canon for three voices
	71B			VII/2, 4 Anh. VIII, 2 No. 14	Fugue, D 71B	E minor	July 1813	For piano; Fragment
966A	71C			V, 6 No. 5	Orchestral piece, D 71C	D major	Aug. or Sep. 1813	Fragment; First pages, a.k.a. D 74A, based on D 74
72	72	(1889) (1890)	III No. 2 XXII v1	VI, 1 No. 1 & Anh.	Wind Octet	F major	completed 18/8/1813	Allegro (fragment, publ. in 1890) – Minuet – Allegro; Slow middle movement lost?
73	73	(1868)	XX, 1 No. 11	IV, 4	Thekla: Eine Geisterstimme, D 73	Wo ich sei, und wo mich hingewendet	22/8/1813– 23/8/1813	Text by Schiller (other setting: D 595)
74	74	(1890)	V No. 6	VI, 4 No. 8	String Quartet No. 6	D major	22/8/1813– Sep. 1813	Allegro ma non troppo – Andante – Minuet – Allegro
966A	74A			V, 6 No. 4	Orchestral piece, D 74A	D major	Aug. or Sep. 1813	Fragment; Variant D number for first pages of D 71C
75	75	(1850)	XVI; No. 16	III, 3 No. 18	Trinklied, D 75	Freunde, sammelt euch im Kreise	29/08/1813	Text by Schäffer; For bTTB and piano
76	76	(1871) (1969)	XX, 10; No. 571	IV, 6 No. 9 Anh. No. 4	Aria di Fronimo	Pensa, che questo istante	7 and 13; Sep. 1813	Text by Metastasio, from Alcide al bivio, 1; For b and piano; Two versions (2nd in AGA)
77; 111	77	(1831) (1894)	XX, 1 No. 12	IV, 6 No. 10	Der Taucher	Wer wagt es, Rittersmann oder Knapp	17/9/1813– early 1815	Text by Schiller; Two versions: 2nd, publ. in 1894, was D 111
78	78	(1895)	XX, 10; No. 572	IV, 6 No. 11	Aria di Venere	Son fra l'onde	18/9/1813	Text by Metastasio, from Gli orti esperdi, I; For s and piano
79	79	(1889)	III No. 3	VI, 1 No. 2	Wind Nonet, a.k.a. Eine kleine Trauermusik or Franz Schuberts Begräbniß-Feyer	E♭ minor	19/9/1813	Grave con espressione
80	80	(1892)	XIX; No. 4	III, 3 No. 2 Anh. III No. 1 Anh. IV No. 1	Zur Namensfeier meines Vaters	Ertöne Leier zur Festesfeier!	27/9/1813	Text by Schubert; For ttb and guitar
81	81	(1895)	XX, 10; No. 583	IV, 14	Auf den Sieg der Deutschen	Verschwunden sind die Schmerzen	fall 1813	Text by Schubert? (other setting: D 88); For voice, two violins and cello
82	82	(1884)	I, 1 No. 1	V, 1 No. 1	Symphony No. 1	D major	completed 28/10/1813	Adagio, Allegro vivace – Andante – Minuet – Allegro vivace
83	83	(1895)	XX, 10; No. 582	IV, 14	Zur Namensfeier des Herrn Andreas Siller	Des Phöbus Strahlen	28/10/1813– 4/11/1813	For voice, violin and harp
84	84	(1888)	XV, 1 No. 1	II, 1	Des Teufels Lustschloß	(Singspiel in three acts)	30/10/1813– 22/10/1814	Text by Kotzebue; Music for sssttbbbSSSATTBB and orchestra; Two versions: Overture (2nd version in AGA) – Act I (Nos. 1–11, 2nd version in AGA) – Act II (Nos. 12–17, 1st version only, in AGA) – Act III (Nos. 18–23, 1st version Nos. 21 and 23 only, 2nd version in AGA); Sketch of an orchestral piece (from 1st version of Act III?): compare D 94A
86	86	(1886)	II; No. 10	VI, 4 Anh. No. 1 VI, 9	Minuet, D 86	D major	November; 1813?	For string quartet
87	87	125p,1 (1840)	V No. 10	VI, 4 No. 9	String Quartet No. 10	E♭ major	November; 1813	Allegro più moderato – Scherzo – Adagio – Allegro
	87A			VI, 4 Anh. No. 2	Andante, D 87A	C major	November; 1813	For four voices (string quartet or vocal ensemble?); Fragment
88	88	(1892)	XIX; No. 21	III, 4 No. 17; VIII, 2 No. 23	Verschwunden sind die Schmerzen	Verschwunden sind die Schmerzen	15/11/1813	Text by Schubert? (other setting: D 88); Canon for ttb
89; 90	89	(1886)	II No. 8 and No. 9	VI, 9	Five Minuets and Five German Dances	Various keys	19/11/1813	For string quartet; Minuets have six Trios, German Dances have seven Trios and a Coda
91	91	(1956)		VII/2, 6	Two Minuets, D 91	Various keys	22/11/1813	For piano; Each minuet with two Trios

== Sources ==
Multi-volume editions, websites and catalogues

- Alte Gesamt-Ausgabe (AGA) = Franz Schubert's Works: Schubert, Franz (1884–1897). Johannes Brahms; Ignaz Brüll; Anton Door; Julius Epstein; Johann Nepomuk Fuchs; Josef Gänsbacher; Joseph Hellmesberger Sr.; Eusebius Mandyczewski (eds.). Franz Schubert's Werke: Kritisch durchgesehene Gesammtausgabe (in German). Leipzig: Breitkopf & Härtel. Reprints of several volumes by Kalmus and Dover Publications; Franz Schubert's Werke (Series I–XIX and XXI), Series XX, Revisionsbericht: Scores at the International Music Score Library Project
- Deutsch catalogue (D) = Schubert Thematic Catalogue:
  - Deutsch, Otto Erich; et al. (Donald R. Wakeling) (1951). Schubert: Thematic Catalogue of all his Works in Chronological Order (1st ed.). London: Dent. 1995 reprint, with errata correction: Deutsch, Otto Erich; et al. (Donald R. Wakeling) (1995). The Schubert Thematic Catalogue (Dover ed.). Mineola, N.Y.: Dover Publications. ISBN 0486286851.
  - Deutsch, Otto Erich (1978). Walther Dürr; Arnold Feil; Christa Landon [in German]; Werner Aderhold (eds.). Franz Schubert: Thematisches Verzeichnis seiner Werke in chronologischer Folge. New Schubert Edition (in German). Kassel: Bärenreiter. ISBN 9783761805718. ISMN 9790006305148.
    - Series VIII (Supplement)
    - Volume 4
- Hoboken catalogue (Hob.): "Joseph Haydn (1732–1809): Werke sortiert nach Hob (Hoboken-Verzeichnis, 1957-78)" (in German). Kaiserslautern: Klassika.
- Köchel catalogue (K.): "Wolfgang Amadeus Mozart (1756–1791): Werke sortiert nach KV^{6} (Köchel-Verzeichnis, 6. Auflage, 1964)" (in German). Kaiserslautern: Klassika.
- Neue Schubert-Ausgabe (NSA) = New Schubert Edition:
  - NSA scores: Schubert, Franz (1968–2019). International Schubert Association (Tübingen) (ed.). Franz Schubert (1797–1828): New Edition of the Complete Works (in German). Kassel: Bärenreiter. [over 80 volumes in eight series] Individual volumes:
    - NSA II, 15: Schubert, Franz; Neumann, Johann Philipp (2008). Jahrmärker, Manuela; Aigner, Thomas (eds.). Sacontala. New Schubert Edition (in German). Kassel: Bärenreiter. ISMN 9790006497294.
      - Series II (Stage Works), Vol. 15
    - NSA VIII, 4: See above Deutsch (1978)
  - NSA website: "New Schubert Edition". Tübingen: International Schubert Association.
- Schubert Online: "www.schubert-online.at: Schubert music manuscripts, first and early editions online". Vienna: Austrian Academy of Sciences (ÖAW).
- The LiederNet Archive: Ezust, Emily; et al. (LiederNet contributors). "Composer: Franz Peter Schubert (1797 - 1828)". Ontario: LiederNet Corporation.

Other

- Badura-Skoda, Eva; Branscombe, Peter, eds. (2008). Schubert Studies: Problems of Style and Chronology. Cambridge University Press. ISBN 0521088720.
  - Walther Dürr "Schubert's Songs and Their Poetry" pp. 1–24
  - Rufus Hallmark "Schubert's 'Auf dem Strom'" pp. 25–46
  - Elaine Brody "Schubert and Sulzer Revisited" pp. 47–60
  - Marius Flothuis "Schubert Revises Schubert" pp. 61–84
  - Elizabeth Norman McKay "Schubert as Composer of Operas" pp. 85–104
  - Peter Branscombe "Schubert and the Melodrama" pp. 105–142
  - Christoph Wolff "Schubert's 'Der Tod und dad Mädchen'" pp. 143–172
  - Peter Gülke on String Quintet D 956 pp. 173–186
  - Paul Badura-Skoda on Schubert's 'Great' C major Symphony pp. 187–208
  - Robert Winter "Paper Studies and the Future of Schubert Research" pp. 209–276
  - Eva Badura-Skoda "The Chronology of Schubert's Piano Trios" pp. 277–296
  - Reinhard Van Hoorickx "The Chronology of Schubert's Fragments and Sketches" pp. 297–326
  - Arnold Feil "Rhythm in Schubert" pp. 327–346
  - Alexander Weinmann on Leopold Puschl and Schubert's sojourn in Zseliz pp. 347–356
- Elsholz, Gunter (1982). Vogel, Reimut (ed.). Franz Schubert: Sinfonie in E-Dur 1825. Stuttgart: Goldoni. ISBN 3922044050. OCLC 987719669.
- Hilmar, Ernst; Jestremski, Margret, eds. (2004). Schubert-Enzyklopädie (in German). Vol. 1. Introduction by Alfred Brendel. Tutzing: Hans Schneider. ISBN 3795211557.
- Keefe, Simon P., ed. (2006). Mozart Studies. Cambridge University Press. ISBN 0521851025.
- Kube, Michael (2009). "Franz Schuberts Deutsche Trauermesse (D 621) als Problem der Text- und Stilkritik". In Mitterauer, Gertraud; Müller, Ulrich; Springeth, Margarete; Vitzthum, Verena (eds.). Was ist Textkritik?: Zur Geschichte und Relevanz eines Zentralbegriffs der Editionswissenschaft (in German). Walter de Gruyter. pp. 129–140. ISBN 3484970782.
- Mozart, Wolfgang Amadeus; Haydn, Joseph; Haydn, Michael (2008). Kircher, Armin (ed.). Chorbuch Mozart • Haydn VII: Kanonsammlung [Choral Collection Mozart • Haydn, Vol. VII: Canon Collection] (in German, Latin, English, and Italian). Stuttgart: Carus-Verlag. OCLC 274222567.
- Newbould, Brian (1999). Schubert: The Music and the Man. University of California Press. ISBN 0520219570.
- Reed, John (1997). The Schubert Song Companion. Manchester University Press. ISBN 1901341003.
- Van Hoorickx, Reinhard (1971). "Franz Schubert (1797–1828) List of the Dances in Chronological Order". Revue belge de Musicologie / Belgisch Tijdschrift voor Muziekwetenschap. 25 (1). Belgian Musicological Society: 68–97. doi:10.2307/3686180. ISSN 0771-6788. JSTOR 3686180.
- Van Hoorickx, Reinhard (1974–1976). "Thematic Catalogue of Schubert's Works: New Additions, Corrections and Notes". Revue belge de Musicologie / Belgisch Tijdschrift voor Muziekwetenschap. 28–30. Belgian Musicological Society: 136–171. doi:10.2307/3686053. ISSN 0771-6788. JSTOR 3686053.
