= List of compositions by Franz Schubert (1812) =

Franz Schubert's compositions of 1812 are mostly in the Deutsch catalogue (D) range D 13–37, and include:

- Instrumental works:
  - String Quartet No. 1, D 18
  - String Quartet No. 2, D 32
  - String Quartet No. 3, D 36
- Vocal music:
  - Klaglied, D 23

== Table ==
=== Legend ===
Legend to the table
column		content
1	D '51	Deutsch number in the first version of the Deutsch catalogue (1951)
2	D utd	most recent (utd = up to date) Deutsch catalogue number; the basic collation of the list is according to these numbers – whether or not the possibility to adjust the sorting according to the content of other columns is available depends on the device with which the table is displayed.
3	Op. pbl	Opus number (Op.; p indicates Post. = posthumous) and date of first publication (pbl; between brackets; when there is more than one date the earlier dates indicate partial publications). The column sorts to Opus number, then (earliest of) the publication date(s)
4	AGA	Alte Gesamt-Ausgabe = Franz Schubert's Werke: Kritisch durchgesehene Gesammtausgabe. Indicates genre/instrumentation: Series I: Symphonien (Nos. 1-8) (Johannes Brahms, 1884); Series II: Overtüren und Andere Orchesterwerke (Johann Nepomuk Fuchs, 1886); Series III: Oktette (Nos. 1-3) and IV: Streichquintett (Eusebius Mandyczewski, 1889); Series V: Streichquartette (Nos. 1-15) (Joseph Hellmesberger and Eusebius Mandyczewski, 1890); Series VI: Trio für Streichinstrumente (Eusebius Mandyczewski, 1892); Series VII: Trios, Quartets and Quintets with Piano and VIII: Pianoforte und Ein Instrument (Ignaz Brüll, 1886); Series IX: Pianoforte zu vier Händen (Anton Door, 1888); Series X: Sonaten für Pianoforte (Julius Epstein, 1888); Series XI: Fantasie, Impromptus und andere Stücke für Pianoforte (Julius Epstein, 1888); Series XII: Tänze für Pianoforte (Nos. 1-31) (Julius Epstein, 1889); Series XIII: Messen (Nos. 1-7) (Eusebius Mandyczewski, 1887); Series XIV: Kleinere Kirchenmusikwerke (Nos. 1-22) (Eusebius Mandyczewski, 1888); Series XV: Dramatische Musik (Johann Nepomuk Fuchs, 1893); Series XVI: Werke für Männerchor (Nos. 1-46) (Eusebius Mandyczewski, 1891); Series XVII: Werke für gemischten Chor (Nos. 1-19) (Josef Gänsbacher, Eusebius Mandyczewski, 1892); Series XVIII: Werke für Drei und mehr Frauenstimmen mit Pianoforte-Begleitung (Nos. 1-6) (Josef Gänsbacher, Eusebius Mandyczewski, 1891); Series XIX: Kleine Gesangswerke (Nos. 1-36) (Josef Gänsbacher and Eusebius Mandyczewski, 1892); Series XX: Sämtliche einstimmige Lieder und Gesänge (Eusebius Mandyczewski, 1894-1895); Series XXI: Supplement (Eusebius Mandyczewski, 1897); 1. Instrumentalmusik No. 1-5; 2. Instrumentalmusik No. 6-13; 3. Instrumentalmusik No. 14-; 4. Gesangsmusik; Series XXII: Revisionsbericht
5	NSA	NGA/NSA/NSE = New Schubert Edition, also indicates genre/instrumentation: Series I: Church Music; Series II: Stage Works; Series III: Part Songs; Series IV: Lieder; Series V: Orchestral Works; Series VI: Chamber Music; 1. Octet and Nonet; 2. String Quintet; 3. String Quartets I; 4. String Quartets II; 5. String Quartets III; 6. String Trios; 7. Works for Piano and several instruments; 8. Works for Piano and one instrument; 9. Dances for several instruments; Series VII: Piano Music; 1. Works for Piano Four Hands; 2. Works for Piano Two Hands; Series VIII: Supplement, 2. Schubert's Studies
6	Name	unique name, with, if available, a link to the relevant encyclopedia article; sorts by name with initial definite ("Der", "Die", "Das", ...) or indefinite ("Ein", "A", ...) articles, and numbers, moved after the expression they qualify: e.g. "Die Hoffnung, ..." sorts as "Hoffnung, Die, ..." – "Thirty Minuets ..." sorts as "Minuets, 30, ...".
7	Key / incipit	incipit mostly for songs (linking to lyrics and their translation, for instance at The LiederNet Archive, when available), other compositions by key, except for Schubert's stage works: type of composition in brackets.
8	Date	(presumed) date of composition, or, for copies and arrangements, date of Schubert's autograph. Sorts to earliest possible date of completion, unlike the chronology of the Deutsch catalogue that generally collates according to earliest date associated with the composition: e.g. Schubert started the composition of his 3rd String Quartet on 19 November 1812 and completed it on 21 February 1813 – in the Deutsch catalogue the composition is grouped with other compositions from 1812: when using the sort function of the 8th column the composition is grouped with compositions completed in 1813
9	Additional info	may include: Information about the text (lyrics, libretto) of vocal compositions: e.g., "Text by [text author]", "Text: [standard lyrics]", "... from [literary work]"; "other settings: D ..." indicates Schubert's other settings of the same text; for fields starting with "Text ..." this column sorts by text author (last name, first name—or pen name when such name is more established), then incipit of the lyrics (alternatively, when the incipit is rarely used, title of the work); Information about the authenticity of the composition: the work is without doubt Schubert's unless when marked as "Doubtful", "Spurious?" or "Spurious" (in the last case columns 3–8 give no further information about the composition); Forces needed for performance ("For ..."): may be omitted when the type of composition makes the instrumentation clear (e.g. String Quartet → two violins, viola and cello), and, for vocal music, when the setting is for voice and piano; "s", "a", "t" and "b" refer to a single soprano, alto, tenor and bass singer respectively, while "S", "A", "T" and "B" to choral parts for the same types of singers (see SATB).; Specifications regarding movements (e.g. "Allegro – Minuet – Rondo") or sections (e.g. "No. 1 ..."); Information about the completeness of the extant work: the work is considered complete as extant unless when marked "Sketch", "Incomplete", "Unfinished", "Fragment" or "Lost"; Information about versions (e.g. "Two versions: ...")

=== List ===
Compositions by Franz Schubert listed in the Deutsch catalogue for 1812
D '51	D utd	Op. pbl	AGA	NSA	Name	Key / incipit	Date	Additional info
13	13			VII/2, 4	Fugue, D 13	D minor	c. 1812	For piano?; By Schubert?
14	14				Overture, D 14		c. 1812	Piano sketch; Lost
15	15	(1895)	XX, 10; No. 590/1	IV, 7 Anh. No. 5	Der Geistertanz, D 15	Die bretterne Kammer der Toten erbebt	c. 1812	Text by Matthisson (other settings: D 15A, 116 and 494); Fragment
15	15A	(1895)	XX, 10; No. 590/2	IV, 7 Anh. No. 6	Der Geistertanz, D 15A	Die bretterne Kammer der Toten erbebt	c. 1812	Text by Matthisson (other settings: D 15, 116 and 494); Fragment
16	16	(1940)		VIII, 2 No. 11	Counterpoint exercises, D 16	G minor (Nos. 1–4); A minor (Nos. 5–7)	1823?	Seven exercises in double counterpoint
17	17	(1940)		VIII, 2 No. 37	Composition exercises, D 17	Quell' innocente figlio	1812?	Text by Metastasio, from Isacco I, "Aria dell' Angelo"; Nine settings with corrections by Salieri; No. 1, for s, related to D 30; No. 2 for ss; Nos. 3 and 5–6 for sat; Nos. 4 and 7–8 for satb (No. 7 not in 1940 publ.)
18	18	(1890)	V No. 1	VI, 3 No. 1	String Quartet No. 1	G minor / B major	1810–1811	Andante, Presto vivace – Minuet – Andante – Presto
19	19				String Quartet, D 19		1810–1811	Lost
19A	19A				String Quartet, D 19A		1810–1811	Lost
	19B				Waltzes and a March, D 19B		1812–1813?	For piano; Lost
20	20				Overture, D 20	B♭ major	1812	For string quartet; Lost
21	21				Six Variations, D 21	E♭ major	1812	For piano; Lost
22	22				Twelve Minuets with Trios, D 22		1812	For piano; Lost
23	23	131p,3 (1830)	XX, 1 No. 6	IV, 6 No. 4	Klaglied	Meine Ruh ist dahin, meine Freud ist entflohn	1812	Text by Rochlitz
24	24				Seven Variations, D 24	F major	1812?	For piano; Fragment; Lost
	24A			VII/2, 4	Fugue, D 24A	C major	summer 1812?	For keyboard (organ or piano); Partly reused in D 24E
	24B			VII/2, 4	Fugue, D 24B	G major	summer 1812?	For keyboard (organ or piano); Two versions
	24C			VII/2, 4	Fugue, D 24C	D minor	summer 1812?	For keyboard (organ or piano)
	24D			VII/2, 4 Anh.	Fugue, D 24D	C major	summer 1812?	For piano; Fragment; Partly reused in D 46
	24E			I, 5 Anh.	Mass, D 24E	F major? Gloria – Credo	summer 1812?	Text: Mass ordinary (other settings: D 31, 45, 49, 56, 66, 105, 167, 324, 452, 678, 755 and 950); For SATB and orchestra; Fragment of a Gloria and a Credo; Partly based on D 24A
25	25			VIII, 2	Counterpoint exercises, D 25		started 18/6/1812	Four 2-part and three 3-part counterpoint exercises; Four 2-part imitation exercises
	25A			VIII, 2	Counterpoint exercises, D 25A		summer 1812?	Two 4-part counterpoint exercises
	25B			VIII, 2	Counterpoint exercises, D 25B		summer 1812?	Fifteen 3-part counterpoint exercises
	25C			VIII, 2	Fugue, D 25C	F major	summer 1812?	Counterpoint exercise for two voices; Fragment
26	26	(1886)	II No. 2	V, 5	Overture, D 26	D major	26/6/1812	For orchestra
27	27	(1928)		I, 8	Salve Regina, D 27	F major Salve Regina	28/06/1812	Text: Salve Regina (other settings: D 106, 223, 386, 676 and 811); For s and orchestra
28	28	(1923)		VI, 7 No. 1	Piano Trio, D 28, a.k.a. Sonata	B♭ major	27/7/1812– 28/8/1812	Allegro
29	29	(1888)	XI No. 9	VII/2, 4	Andante, D 29	C major	9/9/1812	For piano; Related to D 3 and 36
30	30	(1894)	XX, 1 No. 5	IV, 4	Der Jüngling am Bache, D 30	An der Quelle saß der Knabe	24/9/1812	Text by Schiller (other settings: D 192 and 638)
31	31	(1888)	XIV No. 14	I, 5	Kyrie, D 31	D minor Kyrie	25/9/1812	Text: Mass ordinary (other settings: D 24E, 45, 49, 56, 66, 105, 167, 324, 452, 678, 755 and 950); For stSATB and orchestra; First part of a Mass
32	32	(1890) (1897) (1954)	V No. 2 XXII v5	VI, 3 No. 4	String Quartet No. 2	C major	Sep.–Oct. 1812	Presto (publ. in 1890) – Andante – Minuet (publ. in 1890, music partly reappears in D 128 No. 12) – Allegro con spirito (publ. partly in 1897)
33	33	(1940)		VIII, 2 No. 38	Composition exercises, D 33	Entra l'uomo allor che nasce	Sep.–Oct. 1812	Text by Metastasio, from Isacco II, "Aria di Abramo"; Six settings (No. 1 for s, Nos. 2 for sa, No. 3 for sat, Nos. 4–6 for satb) and an Allegretto (b?), with corrections by Salieri
34	34	(1940)		VIII, 2 No. 39	Composition exercises, D 34	Te solo adoro	5/11/1812	Text by Metastasio, from Betulia liberata II, "Aria di Achior"; For satb; Two versions of start; With corrections by Salieri
35	35	(1940)		VIII, 2 No. 40	Composition exercises, D 35	Serbate, o Dei custodi	Oct.–Dec. 1812	Text by Metastasio, from La clemenza di Tito I, 5; Three settings (No. 1 for satb, No. 2 for SATB, No. 3 for t and accompaniment); With corrections by Salieri
36	36	(1890)	V No. 3	VI, 3 No. 5	String Quartet No. 3	B♭ major	19/11/1812– 21/2/1813	Allegro – Andante – Minuet – Allegretto
37	37	74 (1827)	XIX; No. 1	III, 3 No. 1	Die Advokaten	Mein Herr, ich komm' mich anzufragen	25/12/1812– 27/12/1812	Text by Rustenfeld; For ttb and piano

== Sources ==
Multi-volume editions, websites and catalogues

- Alte Gesamt-Ausgabe (AGA) = Franz Schubert's Works: Schubert, Franz (1884–1897). Johannes Brahms; Ignaz Brüll; Anton Door; Julius Epstein; Johann Nepomuk Fuchs; Josef Gänsbacher; Joseph Hellmesberger Sr.; Eusebius Mandyczewski (eds.). Franz Schubert's Werke: Kritisch durchgesehene Gesammtausgabe (in German). Leipzig: Breitkopf & Härtel. Reprints of several volumes by Kalmus and Dover Publications; Franz Schubert's Werke (Series I–XIX and XXI), Series XX, Revisionsbericht: Scores at the International Music Score Library Project
- Deutsch catalogue (D) = Schubert Thematic Catalogue:
  - Deutsch, Otto Erich; et al. (Donald R. Wakeling) (1951). Schubert: Thematic Catalogue of all his Works in Chronological Order (1st ed.). London: Dent. 1995 reprint, with errata correction: Deutsch, Otto Erich; et al. (Donald R. Wakeling) (1995). The Schubert Thematic Catalogue (Dover ed.). Mineola, N.Y.: Dover Publications. ISBN 0486286851.
  - Deutsch, Otto Erich (1978). Walther Dürr; Arnold Feil; Christa Landon [in German]; Werner Aderhold (eds.). Franz Schubert: Thematisches Verzeichnis seiner Werke in chronologischer Folge. New Schubert Edition (in German). Kassel: Bärenreiter. ISBN 9783761805718. ISMN 9790006305148.
    - Series VIII (Supplement)
    - Volume 4
- Hoboken catalogue (Hob.): "Joseph Haydn (1732–1809): Werke sortiert nach Hob (Hoboken-Verzeichnis, 1957-78)" (in German). Kaiserslautern: Klassika.
- Köchel catalogue (K.): "Wolfgang Amadeus Mozart (1756–1791): Werke sortiert nach KV^{6} (Köchel-Verzeichnis, 6. Auflage, 1964)" (in German). Kaiserslautern: Klassika.
- Neue Schubert-Ausgabe (NSA) = New Schubert Edition:
  - NSA scores: Schubert, Franz (1968–2019). International Schubert Association (Tübingen) (ed.). Franz Schubert (1797–1828): New Edition of the Complete Works (in German). Kassel: Bärenreiter. [over 80 volumes in eight series] Individual volumes:
    - NSA II, 15: Schubert, Franz; Neumann, Johann Philipp (2008). Jahrmärker, Manuela; Aigner, Thomas (eds.). Sacontala. New Schubert Edition (in German). Kassel: Bärenreiter. ISMN 9790006497294.
      - Series II (Stage Works), Vol. 15
    - NSA VIII, 4: See above Deutsch (1978)
  - NSA website: "New Schubert Edition". Tübingen: International Schubert Association.
- Schubert Online: "www.schubert-online.at: Schubert music manuscripts, first and early editions online". Vienna: Austrian Academy of Sciences (ÖAW).
- The LiederNet Archive: Ezust, Emily; et al. (LiederNet contributors). "Composer: Franz Peter Schubert (1797 - 1828)". Ontario: LiederNet Corporation.

Other

- Badura-Skoda, Eva; Branscombe, Peter, eds. (2008). Schubert Studies: Problems of Style and Chronology. Cambridge University Press. ISBN 0521088720.
  - Walther Dürr "Schubert's Songs and Their Poetry" pp. 1–24
  - Rufus Hallmark "Schubert's 'Auf dem Strom'" pp. 25–46
  - Elaine Brody "Schubert and Sulzer Revisited" pp. 47–60
  - Marius Flothuis "Schubert Revises Schubert" pp. 61–84
  - Elizabeth Norman McKay "Schubert as Composer of Operas" pp. 85–104
  - Peter Branscombe "Schubert and the Melodrama" pp. 105–142
  - Christoph Wolff "Schubert's 'Der Tod und dad Mädchen'" pp. 143–172
  - Peter Gülke on String Quintet D 956 pp. 173–186
  - Paul Badura-Skoda on Schubert's 'Great' C major Symphony pp. 187–208
  - Robert Winter "Paper Studies and the Future of Schubert Research" pp. 209–276
  - Eva Badura-Skoda "The Chronology of Schubert's Piano Trios" pp. 277–296
  - Reinhard Van Hoorickx "The Chronology of Schubert's Fragments and Sketches" pp. 297–326
  - Arnold Feil "Rhythm in Schubert" pp. 327–346
  - Alexander Weinmann on Leopold Puschl and Schubert's sojourn in Zseliz pp. 347–356
- Elsholz, Gunter (1982). Vogel, Reimut (ed.). Franz Schubert: Sinfonie in E-Dur 1825. Stuttgart: Goldoni. ISBN 3922044050. OCLC 987719669.
- Hilmar, Ernst; Jestremski, Margret, eds. (2004). Schubert-Enzyklopädie (in German). Vol. 1. Introduction by Alfred Brendel. Tutzing: Hans Schneider. ISBN 3795211557.
- Keefe, Simon P., ed. (2006). Mozart Studies. Cambridge University Press. ISBN 0521851025.
- Kube, Michael (2009). "Franz Schuberts Deutsche Trauermesse (D 621) als Problem der Text- und Stilkritik". In Mitterauer, Gertraud; Müller, Ulrich; Springeth, Margarete; Vitzthum, Verena (eds.). Was ist Textkritik?: Zur Geschichte und Relevanz eines Zentralbegriffs der Editionswissenschaft (in German). Walter de Gruyter. pp. 129–140. ISBN 3484970782.
- Mozart, Wolfgang Amadeus; Haydn, Joseph; Haydn, Michael (2008). Kircher, Armin (ed.). Chorbuch Mozart • Haydn VII: Kanonsammlung [Choral Collection Mozart • Haydn, Vol. VII: Canon Collection] (in German, Latin, English, and Italian). Stuttgart: Carus-Verlag. OCLC 274222567.
- Newbould, Brian (1999). Schubert: The Music and the Man. University of California Press. ISBN 0520219570.
- Reed, John (1997). The Schubert Song Companion. Manchester University Press. ISBN 1901341003.
- Van Hoorickx, Reinhard (1971). "Franz Schubert (1797–1828) List of the Dances in Chronological Order". Revue belge de Musicologie / Belgisch Tijdschrift voor Muziekwetenschap. 25 (1). Belgian Musicological Society: 68–97. doi:10.2307/3686180. ISSN 0771-6788. JSTOR 3686180.
- Van Hoorickx, Reinhard (1974–1976). "Thematic Catalogue of Schubert's Works: New Additions, Corrections and Notes". Revue belge de Musicologie / Belgisch Tijdschrift voor Muziekwetenschap. 28–30. Belgian Musicological Society: 136–171. doi:10.2307/3686053. ISSN 0771-6788. JSTOR 3686053.
