= Der Handschuh =

1797 ballad by Friedrich Schiller

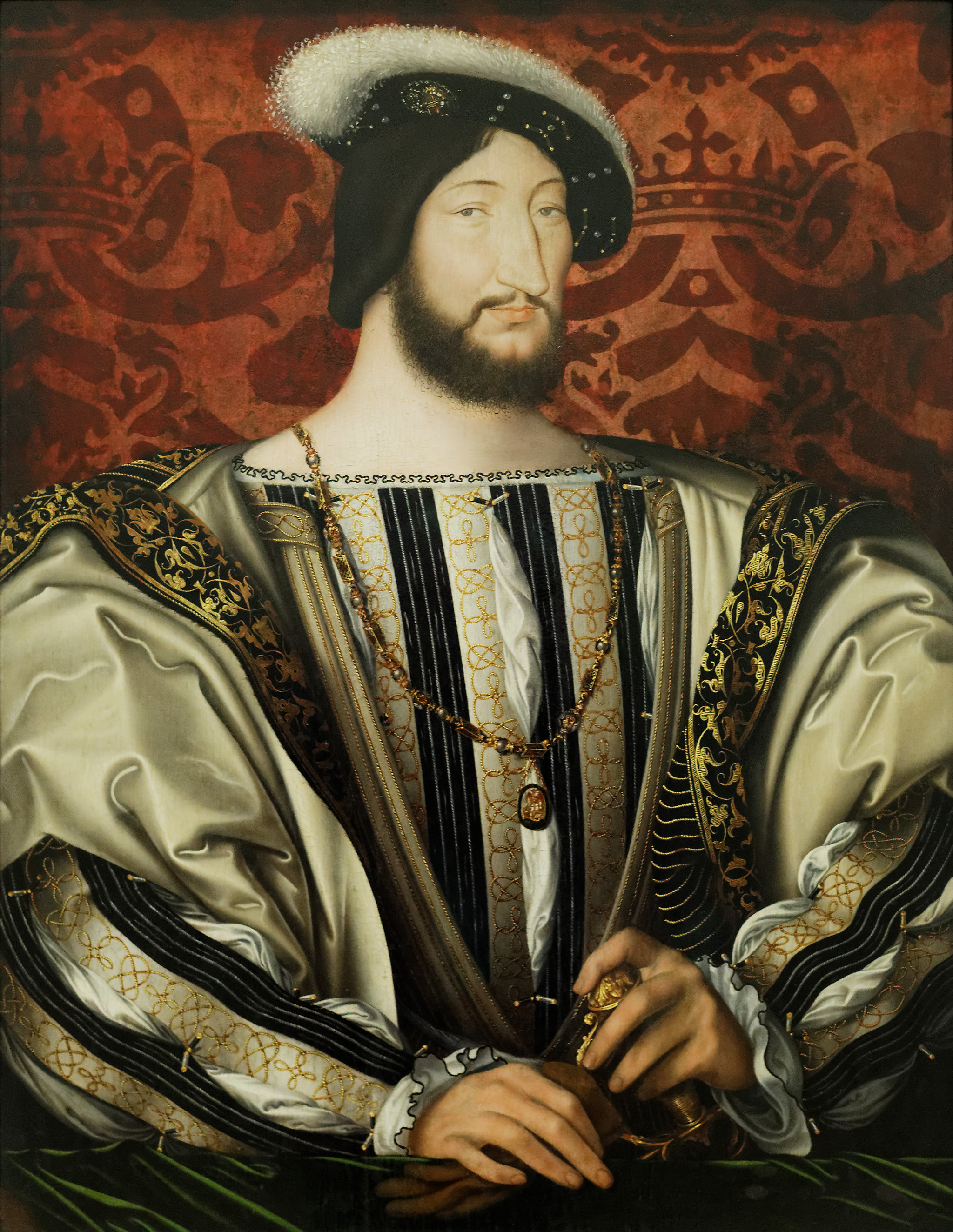
Jean Clouet: Francis I of France (1527), Louvre, Paris

"Der Handschuh" ("The Glove") is a ballad by Friedrich Schiller, written in 1797, the year of his friendly ballad competition ("Balladenjahr", "Year of the Ballads") with Goethe. Other ballads written that year include Schiller's "Der Gang nach dem Eisenhammer", "Die Kraniche des Ibykus", "Der Ring des Polykrates", "Ritter Toggenburg", "Der Taucher", and Goethe's "Die Braut von Korinth", "Der Gott und die Bajadere", "Der Schatzgräber (Goethe)", "The Sorcerer's Apprentice".

== History ==
The ballad is based on a true story, which Schiller found in a volume Essais historiques sur Paris de Monsieur de Saint-Foix (1797). It took place at the court of Francis I of France. The material can also be found in Matteo Bandello's novels published in 1490. Leigh Hunt used it for his poem "The Glove and the Lions" and Robert Browning for "The Glove".

== Synopsis ==
Alongside other members of his court, King Francis I watches a fight between wild animals. A lion is sent out into the arena first, but it simply yawns and lies down. The king then orders a tiger to be released, but after a few moments of excitement it just walks around the lion before also lying down. Next, the king commands two leopards be brought out, which subsequently attack the tiger. In response, the lion roars and stands up, but then they all lie down, hot from their murderous exertions.

At this point Fräulein (Note: Fräulein, an unmarried noblewoman) Kunigund drops her glove: it falls from the balcony into the midst of the animals. She asks the knight Delorges to retrieve the glove as a proof of his proclaimed love. He accepts the challenge, enters the circle, and recovers the glove without being harmed. The court is impressed by his bravery and Kunigunde looks at him with a promise in her eyes, but Delorges throws the glove in her face and says that he has no interest in her gratitude.

== Text ==
The original German text and the English translation by Sir Edward Bulwer-Lytton.

"Der Handschuh"
Spoken German text

Vor seinem Löwengarten,
Das Kampfspiel zu erwarten,
Saß König Franz,
Und um ihn die Großen der Krone,
Und rings auf hohem Balkone
Die Damen in schönem Kranz.

Und wie er winkt mit dem Finger,
Auf tut sich der weite Zwinger,
Und hinein mit bedächtigem Schritt
Ein Löwe tritt
Und sieht sich stumm
Rings um,
Mit langem Gähnen,
Und schüttelt die Mähnen
Und streckt die Glieder
Und legt sich nieder.

Und der König winkt wieder,
Da öffnet sich behend
Ein zweites Tor,
Daraus rennt
Mit wildem Sprunge
Ein Tiger hervor.

Wie der den Löwen erschaut,
Brüllt er laut,
Schlägt mit dem Schweif
Einen furchtbaren Reif,
Und recket die Zunge,
Und im Kreise scheu
Umgeht er den Leu
Grimmig schnurrend,
Drauf streckt er sich murrend
Zur Seite nieder.

Und der König winkt wieder;
Da speit das doppelt geöffnete Haus
Zwei Leoparden auf einmal aus,
Die stürzen mit mutiger Kampfbegier
Auf das Tigertier;

Das packt sie mit seinen grimmigen Tatzen,
Und der Leu mit Gebrüll
Richtet sich auf – da wird's still;
Und herum im Kreis,
Von Mordsucht heiß,
Lagern sich die greulichen Katzen.

Da fällt von des Altans Rand
Ein Handschuh von schöner Hand
Zwischen den Tiger und den Leun
Mitten hinein.

Und zu Ritter Delorges spottender Weis',
Wendet sich Fräulein Kunigund:
"Herr Ritter, ist Eure Lieb' so heiß,
Wie Ihr mir's schwört zu jeder Stund,
Ei, so hebt mir den Handschuh auf."

Und der Ritter in schnellem Lauf
Steigt hinab in den furchtbarn Zwinger
Mit festem Schritte,
Und aus der Ungeheuer Mitte
Nimmt er den Handschuh mit keckem Finger.

Und mit Erstaunen und mit Grauen
Sehen's die Ritter und Edelfrauen,
Und gelassen bringt er den Handschuh zurück.
Da schallt ihm sein Lob aus jedem Munde,
Aber mit zärtlichem Liebesblick –
Er verheißt ihm sein nahes Glück –
Empfängt ihn Fräulein Kunigunde.
Und er wirft ihr den Handschuh ins Gesicht:
"Den Dank, Dame, begehr ich nicht!"
Und verlässt sie zur selben Stunde.

Before his lion-court,
To see the griesly sport,
Sate the king;
Beside him group'd his princely peers,
And dames aloft, in circling tiers,
Wreath'd round their blooming ring.

King Francis, where he sate,
Raised a finger – yawned the gate,
And, slow from his repose,
A lion goes!
Dumbly he gazed around
The foe-encircled ground;
And, with a lazy gape,
He stretch'd his lordly shape,
And shook his careless mane,
And – laid him down again!

A finger raised the King –
And nimbly have the guard
A second gate unbarr'd:
Forth, with a rushing spring,
A tiger sprung!

Wildly the wild one yell'd
When the lion he beheld;
And, bristling at the look,
With his tail his sides he strook,
And roll'd his rabid tongue.
In many a wary ring
He swept round the forest king,
With a fell and rattling sound; –
And laid him on the ground,
Grommelling!

The King raised his finger; then
Leap'd two leopards from the den
With a bound:
And boldly bounded they
Where the crouching tiger lay
Terrible!
And he griped the beasts in his deadly hold!
In the grim embrace they grappled and rolled.
Rose the lion with a roar!
And stood the strife before;
And the wild-cats on the spot,
From the blood-thirst, wroth and hot,
Halted still!

From the gallery raised above,
A fair hand dropp'd a glove: –
Midway between the beasts of prey,
Lion and tiger; there it lay,
The winsome lady's glove!

Fair Cunigonde said, with a lip of scorn,
To the knight Delorges – "If the love you have sworn
Were as gallant and leal as you boast it to be,
I might ask you to bring back that glove to me!"

The Knight left the place where the lady sate;
The Knight he has passed through the fearful gate;
The lion and tiger he stoop'd above,
And his fingers have closed on the lady's glove!

All shuddering and stunn'd, they beheld him there –
The noble knights and the ladies fair;
But loud was the joy and the praise the while
He bore back the glove with his tranquil smile!
With a tender look in her softening eyes,
That promised reward to his warmest sighs,
Fair Cunigonde rose her knight to grace –
He tossed the glove in the lady's face!
"Nay, spare me the guerdon, at least," quoth he;
And he left for ever that fair ladye!

== Musical settings ==
Robert Schumann set this poem to music in his 1850 song, Op. 87. In 2005, on the occasion of the 200th anniversary of Schiller's death, Graham Waterhouse composed Der Handschuh for cello and speaking voice. The English folk song "Lady of Carlisle"/"The Bold Lieutenant"/"The Lion's Den"/"The Lady"s Fan" (Roud 396) and the Grateful Dead's song "Lady with a Fan" on their 1977 album Terrapin Station treat the same material.

== In literature ==
- In Dostoevsky's novel The Brothers Karamazov, Ivan Karamazov recites the line "Den Dank, Dame, begehr ich nicht" to Katerina Ivanovna.

== See also ==
- Princess Kunegunda, a heroine of Slavic legends with a similar plot
