= Balladenjahr =

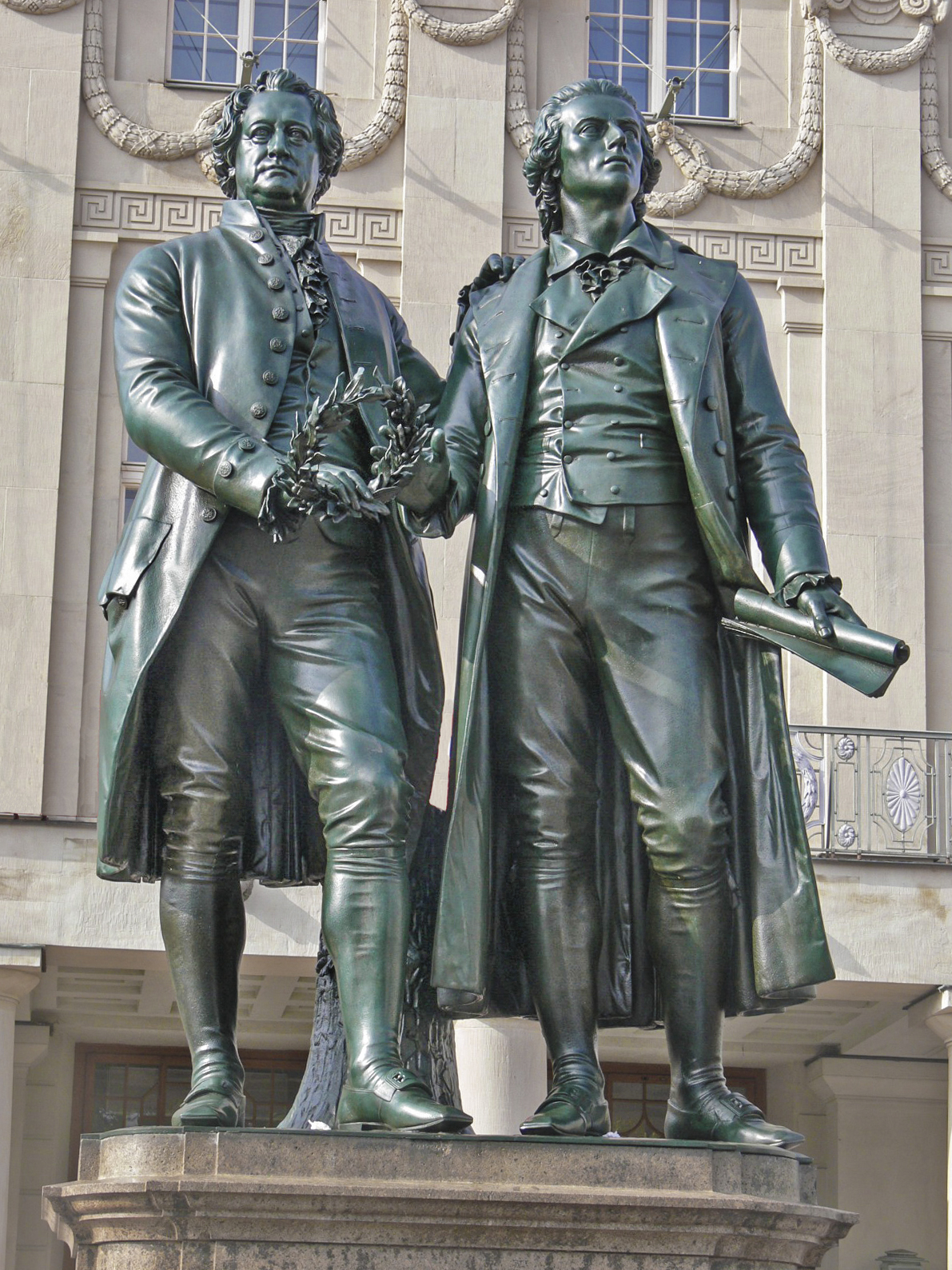
Goethe–Schiller Monument, Weimar

Balladenjahr (ballad year) refers to the year 1797 in the history of German literature, in which many of the best-known ballads of Johann Wolfgang von Goethe and Friedrich Schiller originated within a few months, such as Goethe's "Der Zauberlehrling" ("The Sorcerer's Apprentice") and Schiller's "Der Ring des Polykrates" ("Polycrates' Ring"), "Der Taucher" ("The Diver"), "Der Handschuh" ("The Glove"), "Der Gang nach dem Eisenhammer" ("The Walk to the Hammer Mill"), "Ritter Toggenburg" ("Knight Toggenburg"), and "Die Kraniche des Ibykus" ("The Cranes of Ibycus").

The ballads were first published in Musen-Almanach für das Jahr 1798, the so-called Balladenalmanach issued by Schiller.

== See also ==
- German Wikisource has original text related to this article: Musen-Almanach für das Jahr 1798
