= D82 =

D82 may refer to:

- HMS Reaper (D82), Bogue-class escort carrier of the United States Navy
- HMS Calcutta (D82), C-class light cruiser of the Royal Navy
- County Route D82 (Nassau County, New York)
- D. 82, Symphony No. 1 in D major by Franz Schubert (1813)
