= Der Ring des Polykrates =

Der Ring des Polykrates may refer to:

- Der Ring des Polykrates (poem) by Schiller
- Der Ring des Polykrates (opera) by Korngold
