= D46 =

D46 may refer to:

- Cisitalia D46, an Italian racing car
- D46 motorway (Czech Republic)
- D46 road (Croatia)
- HMS Dragon (D46), a Danae-class cruiser of the Royal Navy
- HMS Winchelsea (D46), a W-class destroyer of the Royal Navy
- Myelodysplastic syndrome
- Semi-Slav Defense, a chess opening
- String Quartet No. 4 (Schubert), by Franz Schubert
