= Princess Kunegunda =

Princess Kunegunda is a heroine of the legends of the Sudetes, and is said to have lived in Kynast Castle in Poland. To avoid marriage, she set a condition that her future spouse must complete a circuit along the castle's walls on horseback in armor. The particular difficulty of the task lay in the fact that the walls were narrower on the side of the castle bordering on a cliff. Many knights died trying to complete the task, until one of them accomplished it and rejected the love of the princess. In response, Kunegunda jumped over the edge.

The legend has formed the basis of various tales, for example by Adam Mickiewicz.

== Legend ==
Kunegunda was a beautiful princess living in the castle at the top of Chojnik. After the death of her father, she started ruling the castle. Her greatest pleasures were deer hunting and horse riding. Because she was rich and beautiful, many noble knights wanted to become her husband, but she said that she would marry only the knight who could complete a circuit along the castle's walls on a horseback, while wearing armor, a helmet, with a sword and shield in hand. She knew that the walls near the abyss were very narrow and considered the task impossible to accomplish. Many tried and perished. Kunegunda liked watching men die for desiring her. After a few years, when it was believed that every attempt eventually ended in a fall, nobody dared solicit Kunegunda’s love. The princess was leading a calm life in her castle until a proud knight came along. Standing at the gates of the castle, the man promised that he would go round the castle's walls. In the evening, when the knight was dining, he started talking about his travel in a very interesting way, and most of the castle servants crowded into the chamber. Kunegunda, informed by her maid, wanted to hear the story but the princess was too proud to sit at the table with servants. She also could not call the tired newcomer to her room in the evening, so Kunegunda wore a maid's dress and hid in the corner, where she stayed unnoticed. The knight told about his family and his city, Kraków. Kunegunda realized that she was falling in love with the man, who would surely die the day after. During the night, the desperate princess sent the maid to the knight with the message that she rescinded the obligation to ride around the walls and would marry him. The man answered that he was a knight who had never broken a promise and he was going to accomplish the deed.

The next day at dawn Kunegunda was awaken by the sounds of trumpets, which meant that the knight had already got on his horse. When he was near the most dangerous place, the princess started praying to God and Saint Kunegunda for help. Eventually she fainted. She came to because she heard happy, laughing voices. The princess came running quickly to the knight and avowed that she would become his wife. However, contrary to Kunegunda's expectations, the knight said that he had not come to get married, but to complete the circuit along the castle's walls and so restrain her cruelty, which had caused the death of many valiant men who had had the loftiest goals and should be remembered as heroes. He claimed that he would never marry a woman who was guilty of the sin of murder and then he left Chojnik.

The legend ends in three different ways. The most popular says that the princess could not bear the shame and jumped over the cliff. She died and the corpse was taken by devils to hell. For that reason the road running from the castle to the abyss is called Droga Kunegundy (Road of Kunegunda) or Droga przez piekło (Road through hell) and the valley that this road runs – Piekielna Dolina (Hellish Valley).

The second version says that Kunegunda died in monastery which she joined in partial pennance.

The third end tells about Kungunda's marriage with German knight Elwardt von Ehrbach, who once traveled with her wearing servant clothes. Kunegunda knocked down the wall on the cliff side and paid for masses for the souls of the dead knights. She wanted people to forgive her cruelty, so she gave many alms.

== Princess Kunegunda in literature ==
- Theodor Körner – ballad Der Kynast
- Friedrich Rückert – ballad Die Begrüssung auf dem Kynast
- Józef Sykulski – Kunegunda księżniczka na zamku Kynast
- James Clarence Mangan - His poem, "The Ride Around the Parapet," is a somewhat loose retelling of the story, changing the heroine's name to "Lady Eleanora von Alleyne," and making her end her life by being transformed "by magic, to an ugly wooden image."

== See also ==
- Der Handschuh, Friedrich Schiller's ballad with a similar plot
