= String Quartet No. 5 (Schubert) =

The String Quartet No. 5 (D 68) in B♭ major was composed by Franz Schubert in 1813. The string quartet has two movements:

1. Allegro
2. Allegro

The middle movements have been lost.

== Sources ==
- Black, Brian (1996). Schubert's Apprenticeship In Sonata Form: The Early String Quartets (PDF) (Ph.D.). McGill University.
- Franz Schubert's Works, Series V: Streichquartette edited by Joseph Hellmesberger and Eusebius Mandyczewski. Breitkopf & Härtel, 1890
- Otto Erich Deutsch (and others). Schubert Thematic Catalogue (several editions), No. 68.
- New Schubert Edition, Series VI, Volume 3: Streichquartette I edited by Martin Chusid. Bärenreiter, 1979.
