= String Quartet No. 10 (Schubert) =

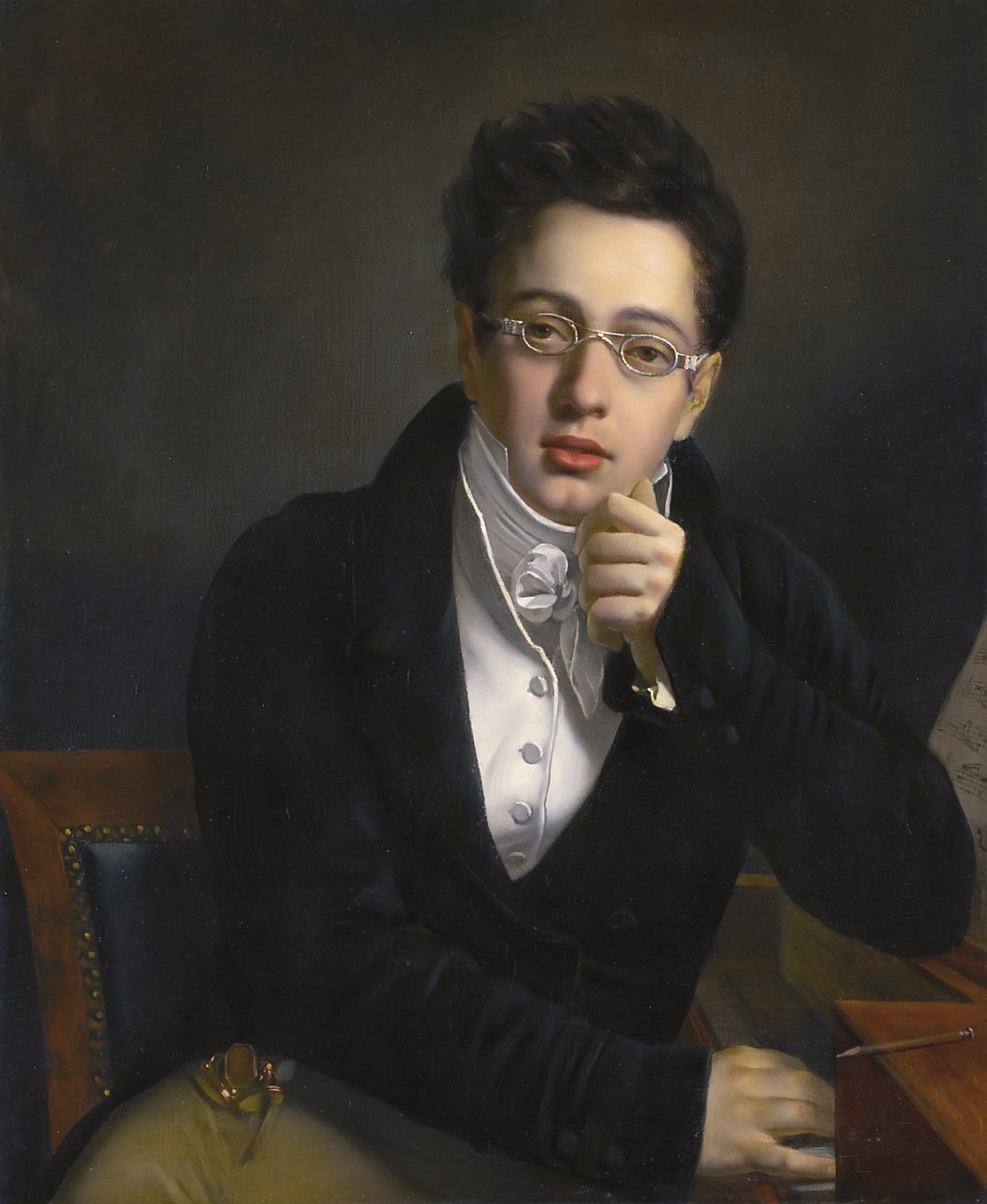
Possible portrait of the young Franz Schubert c. 1814, attributed to Josef Abel

Franz Schubert composed his String Quartet No. 10 (D. 87) in E♭ major in 1813.

== Historical background ==
Musicologist Otto Erich Deutsch records that the youthful work (Schubert was sixteen years old at the time) was first performed privately in the Schubert household, by members of the family. Perhaps in part for this reason, this composition has acquired the nickname of the "Haushaltung" (Household) Quartet.

Author Melvin Berger suggests that the quartet’s nickname has stuck because the piece "is so well suited for home performance,” calling it “technically … quite undemanding” to accommodate the “limited performing abilities” of amateur musicians.

The quartet was published only posthumously, in 1830, as Op. 125 No. 1.

== Movements ==
The string quartet has four movements:

1. Allegro moderato (E♭ major)
2. Scherzo. Prestissimo (E♭ major, with Trio in C minor)
3. Adagio (E♭ major)
4. Allegro (E♭ major)

The work is homotonal: that is, all the movements are in the same key — in this case the tonic key of E♭ major.

== Sources ==
- Franz Schubert's Works, Series V: Streichquartette edited by Joseph Hellmesberger and Eusebius Mandyczewski. Breitkopf & Härtel, 1890.
- Otto Erich Deutsch (and others). Schubert Thematic Catalogue (several editions), No. 87.
- New Schubert Edition, Series VI, Volume 4: String Quartets II edited by Werner Aderhold, Bärenreiter, 1994.
