= String Quartet No. 1 (Schubert) =

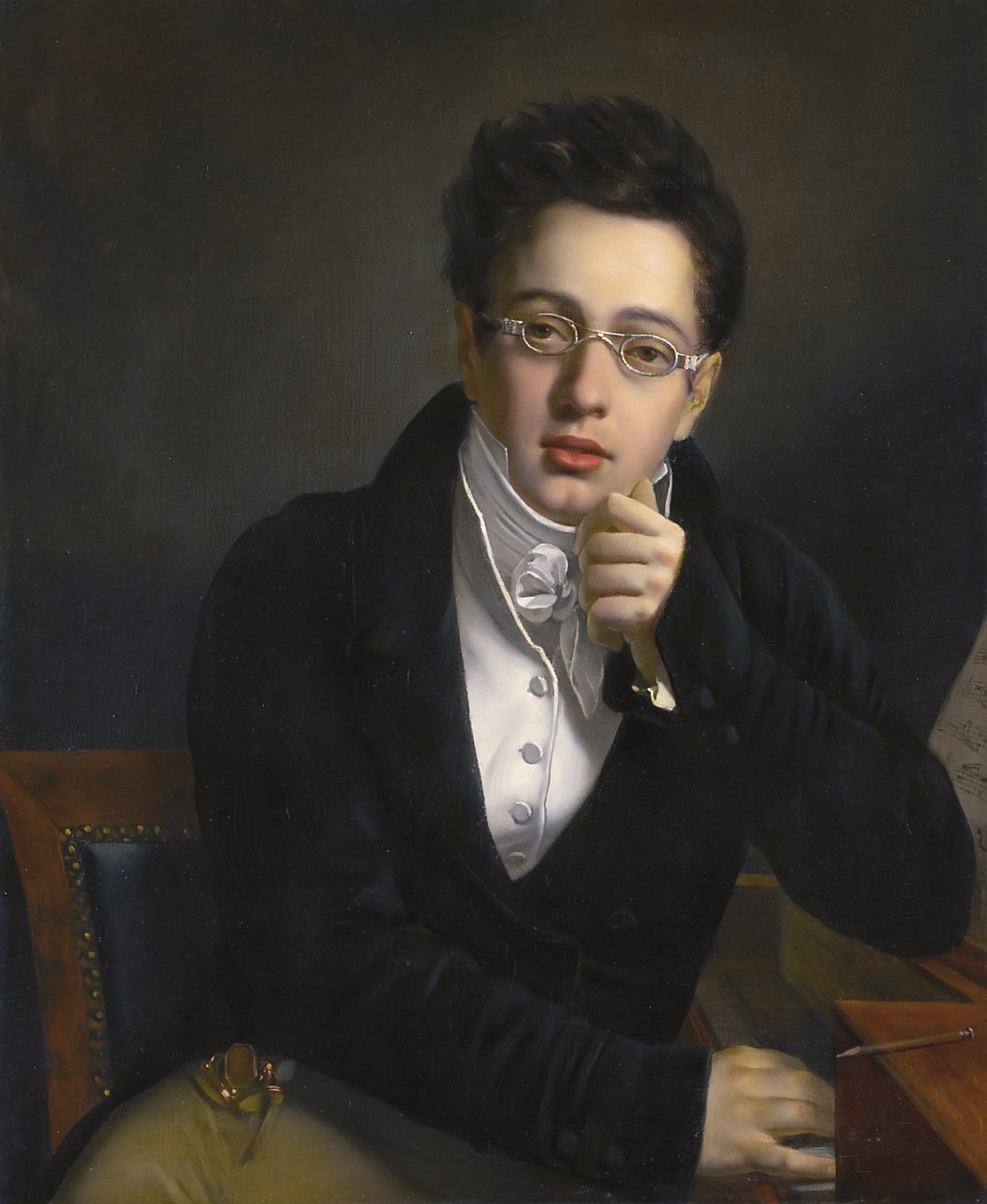
Possible portrait of the young Franz Schubert c. 1814, attributed to Josef Abel

The String Quartet No. 1 (D 18) in mixed keys was composed by Franz Schubert in 1810 or 1811.

== History ==
A partial autograph of the composer kept in the Vienna City Library has the date 1812 written on the cover. The composition date is however more likely 1810, when the composer was 13 years old. As such it may be Schubert's earliest extant completed multi-movement work for more than one player. The quartet was played in 1812 by the quartet of Schubert's family (his father Franz Theodor, his brothers Ignaz and Ferdinand, and Schubert himself playing viola). The first published edition of the quartet was in 1890, in the complete edition of Franz Schubert's Works issued by Breitkopf & Härtel.

== Description ==
The work has the traditional four movements of a classical string quartet, with the Menuetto preceding the slow movement (Andante). The key signature of the work is undefined as it starts in one key and ends in another. D 18 is the only remaining of a set of three early string quartets "in changing, undefined" key signatures by Schubert. The Deutsch catalogue indicates its key as g/B♭.

The string quartet has four movements:

1. Andante – Presto vivace (G minor)
2. Menuetto (F major, with Trio in C major)
3. Andante (B♭ major)
4. Presto (B♭ major)
