= Sonatensatz, D 28 (Schubert) =

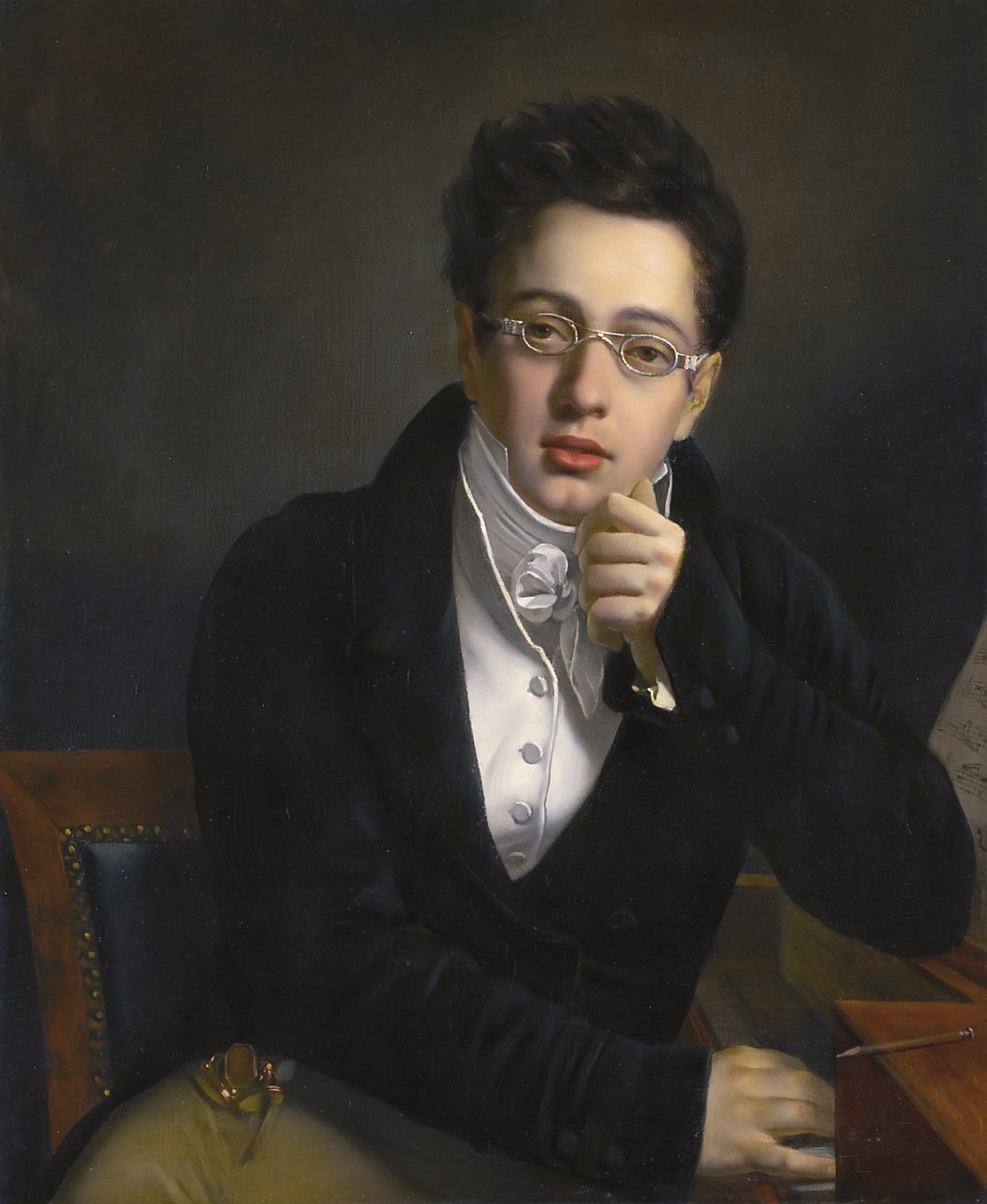
Possible portrait of the young Franz Schubert c. 1814, attributed to Josef Abel

The Sonatensatz in B♭ major D. 28, also known as Piano Trio in B♭ major, is a single-movement work for piano trio by Franz Schubert.

== Background ==
This work was written in 1812, immediately after the fifteen-year-old composer lost his place in Vienna's Imperial Chapel Choir due to his voice breaking. Schubert spent most of the August composing this work, his first ever composition for strings and piano, but abandoned it after finishing the first movement. It was also in this year that his mother died. Although relatively little known, the work is important among Schubert's early output, and Schubert's only previous exercise in the genre when he penned his more celebrated piano trios D. 898 and D. 929 15 years later.

Like several other of his works from this time, this piano trio movement was heavily inspired by classical models, partly reflective of Schubert's having begun lessons with Antonio Salieri, although Schubert was already giving the cello part a more emancipated role than in Mozart's piano trios. Eva Badura-Skoda writes that it contains "...some charming passages and even traits of genuine Schubert here and there in this movement; but altogether one can still feel Schubert's lack of experience."

== Structure and analysis ==
The work comprises a single sonata form movement marked Allegro. It takes approximately 10 minutes to perform

The sonata form structure is notable for a discursive exposition incorporating numerous themes.
