= String Quartet No. 6 (Schubert) =

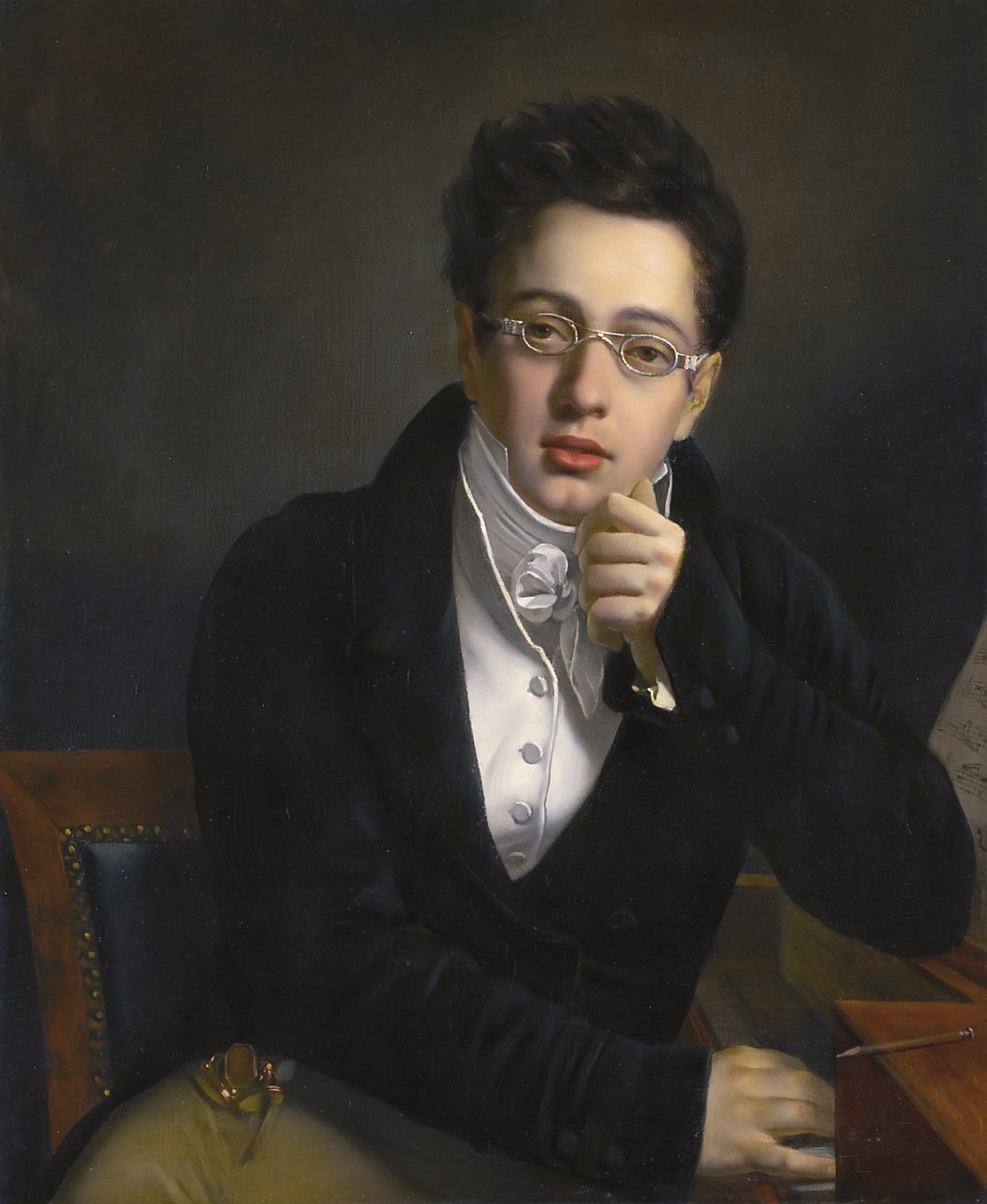
Possible portrait of the young Franz Schubert c. 1814, attributed to Josef Abel

The String Quartet No. 6 (D 74) in D major was composed by Franz Schubert in 1813.

== Movements ==
The string quartet is in four movements:

1. Allegro ma non troppo (D major)
2. Andante (G major)
3. Menuetto: Allegro (D major, with Trio in D major)
4. Allegro (D major)

== Sources ==
- Franz Schubert's Works, Series V: Streichquartette edited by Joseph Hellmesberger and Eusebius Mandyczewski. Breitkopf & Härtel, 1890.
- Otto Erich Deutsch (and others). Schubert Thematic Catalogue (several editions), No. 74.
- New Schubert Edition, Series VI, Volume 4: String Quartets II edited by Werner Aderhold, Bärenreiter, 1994.
