= La clemenza di Tito (disambiguation) =

La clemenza di Tito (1791) is an opera by Wolfgang Amadeus Mozart to a libretto by Metastasio.

Other settings of this libretto include:

- La clemenza di Tito (Caldara) 1734 – the original setting of the libretto
- La clemenza di Tito (Gluck), opera by Christoph Willibald Gluck (premiered 1752)
- La clemenza di Tito (Mysliveček), opera by Josef Mysliveček (premiered 1774)
- Composition exercises on "Serbate, o Dei custodi" by Franz Schubert, D 35 (1812), text taken from act 1, scene 5

For a more complete list, see :de:La clemenza di Tito (Metastasio) § Vertonungen. (in German)
