= String Quartet No. 2 (Schubert) =

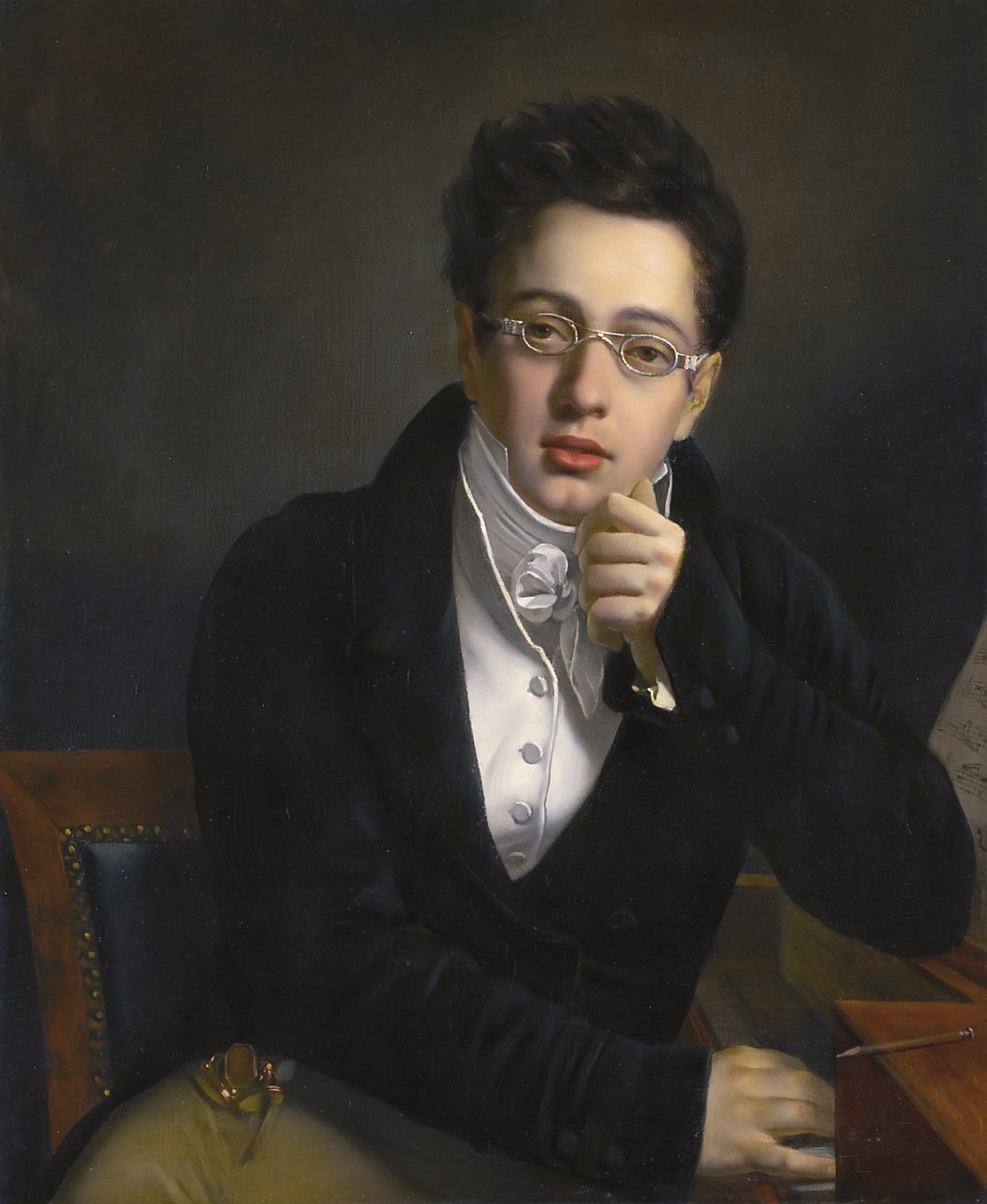
Possible portrait of the young Franz Schubert c. 1814, attributed to Josef Abel

The String Quartet No. 2 (D 32) in C major was composed by Franz Schubert in 1812.

== Movements ==
The string quartet has four movement:

1. Presto (C major)
2. Andante (A minor)
3. Menuetto (C major, with Trio in F major)
4. Allegro con spirito (C minor – C major)

The autograph was widely scattered, and hence the first edition in the Alte Gesamt-Ausgabe included only the first and third movements, as well as the second half of the finale in the critical report. The remainder was discovered much later (in the Otto Taussig collection at Lund University in Malmo) by Maurice J. E. Brown, who edited the complete work for publication.

== Sources ==
- Franz Schubert's Works:
  - Series V: Streichquartette edited by Joseph Hellmesberger and Eusebius Mandyczewski. Breitkopf & Härtel, 1890
  - Series XXII: Revisionsbericht, Volume 1: Instrumentalmusik
- Otto Erich Deutsch (and others). Schubert Thematic Catalogue (several editions), No. 32.
- New Schubert Edition, Series VI, Volume 3: Streichquartette I edited by Martin Chusid. Bärenreiter, 1979.
