= Der Gang nach dem Eisenhammer =

Der Gang nach dem Eisenhammer is a ballad written by Friedrich Schiller, as part of his 1797 ballad competition with Goethe.

== Sources ==
- Moritz Retzsch: Acht Umrisse zu Schiller's Fridolin: oder der Gang nach dem Eisenhammer. Mit einigen Andeutungen von Carl August Böttiger. Cotta, Stuttgart 1837.
- Ulrike Völz: Funktion des Mittelalters in Schillers klassischen Balladen „Ritter Toggenburg“ und „Der Gang nach dem Eisenhammer“. Hausarbeit, Universität Greifswald 1990.
