= Der Taucher =

1797 ballad by Schiller

"Der Taucher" ("The Diver") is a ballad by Friedrich Schiller, written in 1797, the year of his friendly ballad competition with Goethe.

== Synopsis ==
A king throws a golden beaker into a whirlpool and promises that the one who can recover it can also keep it. However, none of his knights and pages is willing to do so, and the king has to ask three times before an Edelknecht (squire) finds his courage. He deposits his sword and his coat and commends his life to God and jumps into the intimidating sea. Everyone at the shore fears that the boy will not return. After a while, he emerges with the beaker in his hand. His terrifying report intrigues the king. The king wants him to dive again and promises him a precious ring. The king's daughter tries to convince her father to stop with his cruel demands. Yet the king throws the beaker in the sea again and promises now that he will make the Edelknecht a knight and let him marry his daughter if he recovers the beaker again. The boy has a look at the girl and wants her to become his bride, so he jumps into the deep again. This time, he does not return.

== Settings ==
Franz Schubert set "Der Taucher" as a song for bass and piano in two versions (1813–1815, D 77 – the second version originally D 111). Conradin Kreutzer based his opera Der Taucher (1813) on Schiller's ballad.

== Analysis ==
Schiller's inspiration for the poem has been the subject of debate. Several scholars including folklorist Giuseppe Pitrè suggested that the ballad was connected to the folktale of Cola Pesce, which similarly has a king order a man to dive underwater multiple times after a piece of treasure, until on a final trip the swimmer dies. However, Schiller did not recognize the story as a folktale and was unfamiliar with the name "Nicolaus Pesce" when he heard it, as shown in his letters. John Edward Fletcher suggests that Schiller had originally heard an oral version of the diver's story, sans name, from Goethe.
