= Mass No. 5 (Schubert) =

- by Franz Schubert
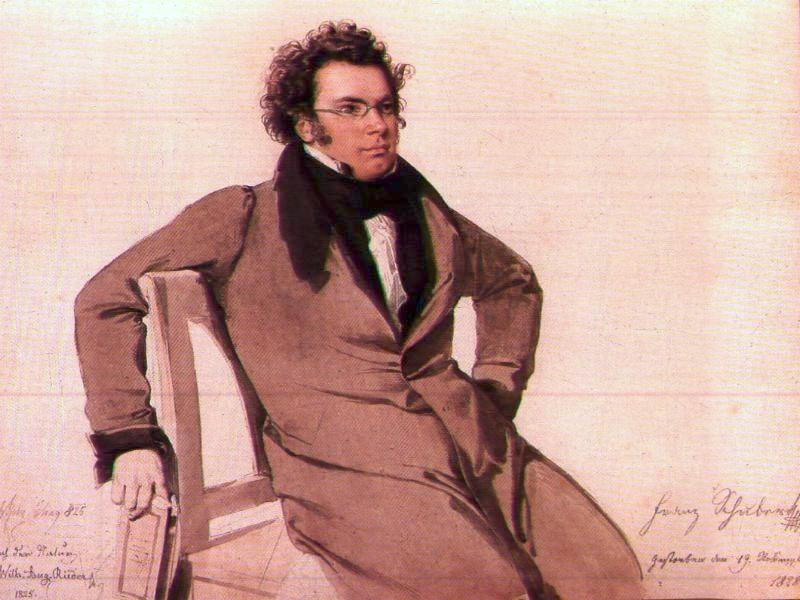
- Franz Schubert in 1825 (watercolor by Wilhelm August Rieder)
- Key: A-flat major
- Catalogue: D 678
- Form: Missa solemnis
- Composed: 1819–1822: Vienna
- Movements: 6
- Vocal: SATB choir and soloists
- Instrumental: orchestra and organ

Mass No. 5 in A♭ major, D 678, is a mass composed by Franz Schubert, completed in 1822. There is no record of a performance during Schubert's lifetime. It is scored for soprano, alto, tenor and bass soloists, SATB choir with divisi, violin I and II, viola, flute, 2 oboes, 2 clarinets, 2 bassoons, 2 horns, 2 trumpets, 3 trombones colla parte, timpani and basso continuo (cello, double bass and organ). It is classified as a missa solemnis.

== Background ==
Schubert commenced composition of the mass in November 1819, completing it three years later in 1822. Various projects had competed for the composer's attention in the meantime, including his brother Ferdinand's request for a mass (which produced the Mass sketch in A minor, D 755 ). Schubert wrote out the organ part in October or November 1822, and although plans were made for a performance in 1823, records of a performance in Schubert's lifetime do not exist.

This setting and the later Mass in E♭ major are regarded as Schubert's "late masses". These are distinguished from his four early masses by their "musically interpretive stance to the words"; Schubert began to take advantage of an overall maturation in his technical capabilities and knowledge of harmony, coupled with his experience in composing both sacred and secular music, to add further meaning to the standard text. Already known for consistently omitting certain passages from the text, Schubert took even greater freedoms in the late masses, adding and removing text in a bid to "deepen expression or enhance a particular aspect of meaning".

Schubert revised his original setting in 1826, producing a shorter, simplified fugue for the Cum Sancto Spiritu section of the Gloria, and changing the Osanna. In 1827, Schubert used this revision as an audition for the position of deputy kapellmeister in the Imperial Court Chapel, an ultimately unsuccessful venture. The Hofkapellmeister Joseph Eybler denied Schubert's request for a court performance of the mass, on the grounds that it was not in the Kaiser's preferred style; Eybler may have invented this excuse as he favoured the court composer Joseph Weigl, and did not wish to pay Schubert the honorarium the performance would incur.

The Schubert scholar Brian Newbould considered the late masses to be the composer's "two finest and most substantial settings", and that Schubert himself must have regarded the Mass in A♭ very highly, judging by his "extended labours" and numerous returns to the setting. In a December 1822 letter to his friend Joseph von Spaun, Schubert contemplated dedicating the mass to the Emperor or Empress, "for it has turned out well".

Mass No. 5, as well as the unfinished setting of the oratorio Lazarus (D 689), are seen as products of Schubert's reflections on life and death.

The late masses may have influenced the composition of Bruckner's Mass in F minor.

== Structure ==
The mass consists of six movements. Performances require approximately 46 minutes. Commentary is based on the original 1822 version.

1. Kyrie, Andante con moto, A♭ major, cut common time
2. Gloria, Allegro maestoso e vivace, E major, 3/4
  - Gratias agimus tibi, Andantino, A major, 2/4
  - Domine Deus, Rex coelestis, Andantino, A minor, 2/4
  - Gratias agimus tibi, Andantino, A major, 2/4
  - Domine Deus, Agnus Dei, Allegro moderato, E major, cut common time
3. Credo, Allegro maestoso e vivace, C major, cut common time
  - Et incarnatus est, Grave, A♭ major, 3/2
  - Et resurrexit, Allegro maestoso e vivace, C major, cut common time
4. Sanctus, Andante, F major, 12/8
  - While the orchestra begins the piece with a short prelude in F major, the choir enters in F♯ minor, to "stunning" effect.
  - Osanna in excelsis, Allegro, F major, 6/8
5. Benedictus, Andante con moto, A♭ major, common time
  - Osanna in excelsis, Allegro, F major, 6/8
6. Agnus Dei, Adagio, A♭ major, 3/4
  - Dona nobis pacem, Allegretto, A♭ major, cut common time

== Notes ==
Sources

- Black, Leo (2003). Franz Schubert: Music and Belief. Boydell Press. ISBN 978-1-84383-135-8.
- Gibbs, Christopher H. (1997). The Cambridge Companion to Schubert. Cambridge Companions to Music. Cambridge University Press. ISBN 978-0-521-48424-4.
- Hawkshaw, Paul (2013). "Anton Bruckner and the Austrian Choral Tradition". In Di Grazia, Donna M. (ed.). Nineteenth-Century Choral Music. Routledge. ISBN 978-1-136-29409-9.
- Howie, Crawford (2008). "Small is beautiful: Schubert's smaller sacred works". In Reul, Barbara M.; Bodley, Lorraine Byrne (eds.). The Unknown Schubert. Ashgate Publishing Ltd. ISBN 978-0-7546-6192-4.
- Johnston, Blair (n.d.). "Mass for soloists, chorus, orchestra & organ in A-flat major (Missa Solemnis), D. 678".
- Newbould, Brian (1999). Schubert: The Music and the Man. University of California Press. ISBN 978-0-520-21957-1.
- Rushton, Julian (2002). "Music and the poetic". In Samson, Jim (ed.). The Cambridge History of Nineteenth-Century Music. Cambridge University Press. ISBN 978-0-521-59017-4.
- Shrock, Dennis (2009). Choral Repertoire. Oxford University Press. ISBN 978-0-19-971662-3.
- Van Hoorick, Reinhard (1982). "The chronology of Schubert's fragments and sketches". In Badura-Skoda, Eva; Branscombe, Peter (eds.). Schubert Studies: Problems of Style and Anthology. CUP Archive. ISBN 978-0-521-22606-6.
