= Mass No. 6 (Schubert) =

Mass composed by Franz Schubert

- by Franz Schubert
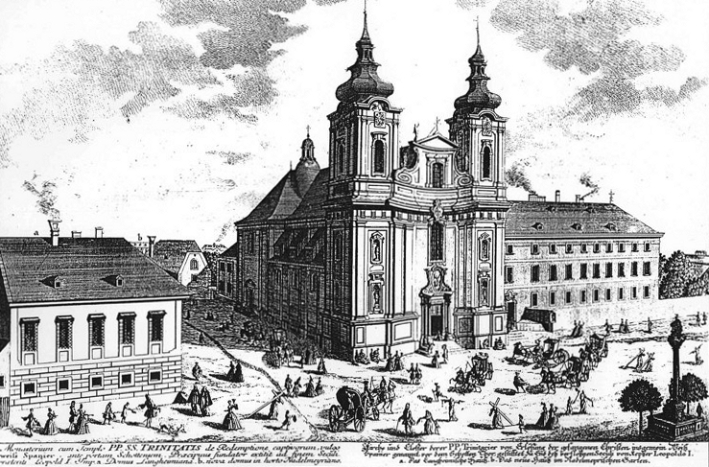
- Church of the Holy Trinity in Alsergrund, c. 1724, where the mass received its first performance in 1829
- Key: E♭ major
- Catalogue: D 950
- Form: Missa solemnis
- Composed: 1828
- Performed: 1829: Alsergrund Church of the Holy Trinity
- Movements: 6
- Vocal: SATB choir and soloists
- Instrumental: Orchestra

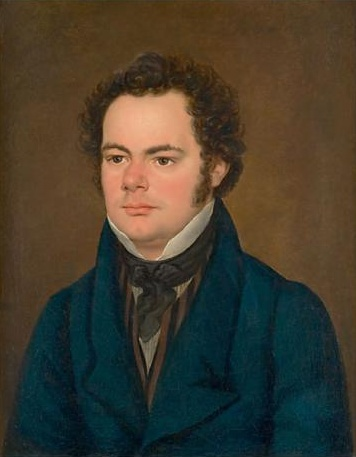
Franz Schubert by Franz Eybl (1827)

Mass No. 6 in E♭ major, D 950, is a mass composed by Franz Schubert, a few months before his death. It is scored for two tenor soloists, soprano, alto and bass soloists, SATB choir with divisi, 2 oboes, 2 clarinets, 2 bassoons, 2 horns, 2 trumpets, 3 trombones, timpani, violin I and II, viola, cello, and double bass. It was Schubert's final setting of the order of Mass, and is classified as a missa solemnis.

== Background ==
The first date to appear on the score is June 1828, although evidence exists that Schubert had begun to sketch it earlier than this. It was completed by July. It was composed in response to a commission or request from Michael Leitermayer, choirmaster of the Church of the Holy Trinity (Alserkirche) in Alsergrund, Vienna. The mass was not performed until after Schubert's death, with a premiere in the Alserkirche on October 4, 1829. Ferdinand Schubert conducted the premiere, as well as a second performance in the Church of Maria Trost on November 15, 1829.

The influence of Beethoven is felt in the mass, particularly in the "ambitious Beethovenian architecture". Schubert had been a torchbearer at Beethoven's funeral, which had been held in the Alserkirche. References to Bach's fugues are present in the Gloria and Agnus Dei, as well as Mozart's Requiem and Haydn's Heiligmesse.

This setting and the earlier Mass No. 5 are regarded as Schubert's "late masses". These are distinguished from his four early masses by their "musically interpretive stance to the words"; Schubert began to take advantage of an overall maturation in his technical capabilities and knowledge of harmony, coupled with his experience in composing both sacred and secular music, to add further meaning to the standard text. Already known for consistently omitting certain passages from the text, Schubert took even greater freedoms in the late masses, adding and removing text in a bid to "deepen expression or enhance a particular aspect of meaning".

The Schubert scholar Brian Newbould opined that the late masses were the composer's "two finest and most substantial settings", calling the Mass in E♭ "the triumph and swansong of [Schubert's] career (as far as the composition of masses is concerned)", although he also admits that it has "unevenness". Schubert's biographer Kreissle von Hellborn wrote that the Mass in E♭ "takes rank with the foremost compositions of the kind written at the time".

The late masses may have influenced the composition of Bruckner's Mass in F minor.

Rieter-Biedermann published the first edition of the piano score in 1865, anonymously edited by Johannes Brahms.

== Structure ==
The mass consists of six movements. Performances require approximately an hour.

1. Kyrie, Andante con moto, quasi Allegretto, E♭ major, 3/4
2. Gloria, Allegro moderato e maestoso, B♭ major, common time
  Domine Deus, Andante con moto, G minor, 3/4
  Quoniam tu solus sanctus, Allegro moderato e maestoso, B♭ major, common time
  Cum sancto Spiritu, Moderato, B♭ major, alla breve
3. Credo, Moderato, E♭ major, alla breve
  Et incarnatus est, Andante, A♭ major, 12/8
  Et resurrexit, Moderato, E♭ major, cut common time
4. Sanctus, Adagio, E♭ major, 12/8
  In a display of "unusual and thoroughly proto-Romantic modulation", the Sanctus opens in E♭ major, moves to B minor, then to G minor, and finally to E♭ minor, all in the space of 8 bars.
  Osanna in excelsis, Allegro ma non troppo, E♭ major, 2/4
5. Benedictus, Andante, A♭ major, alla breve
  Osanna in excelsis, Allegro ma non troppo, E♭ major, 2/4
6. Agnus Dei, Andante con moto, C minor, 3/4
  Dona nobis pacem, Andante, E♭ major, alla breve
  Agnus Dei, Andante, E♭ minor, 3/4
  Dona nobis pacem, Andantino, E♭ major, alla breve

== Notes ==
Sources

- Avins, Styra, ed. (1997). Johannes Brahms: Life and Letters. ISBN 9780199247738.
- Gibbs, Christopher H. (1997). The Cambridge Companion to Schubert. Cambridge Companions to Music. ISBN 9780521484244.
- Greene, David Mason (1985). Biographical Encyclopedia of Composers. ISBN 9780385142786.
- Hawkshaw, Paul (2013). "Anton Bruckner and the Austrian Choral Tradition". In Di Grazia, Donna M. (ed.). Nineteenth-Century Choral Music. ISBN 9781136294099.
- Howie, Crawford (2008). "Small is beautiful: Schubert's smaller sacred works". In Reul, Barbara M.; Bodley, Lorraine Byrne (eds.). The Unknown Schubert. ISBN 9780754661924.
- Kreissle von Hellborn, Heinrich (1869). The Life of Franz Schubert. Vol. 2. Translated by Arthur Duke Coleridge.
- Newbould, Brian (1999). Schubert: The Music and the Man. ISBN 9780520219571.
- Rushton, Julian (2002). "Music and the poetic". In Samson, Jim (ed.). The Cambridge History of Nineteenth-Century Music. Cambridge University Press. ISBN 978-0-521-59017-4.
- Shrock, Dennis (2009). Choral Repertoire. ISBN 9780199716623.
