= Symphony No. 1 (Schubert) =

Symphony by Schubert from 1813

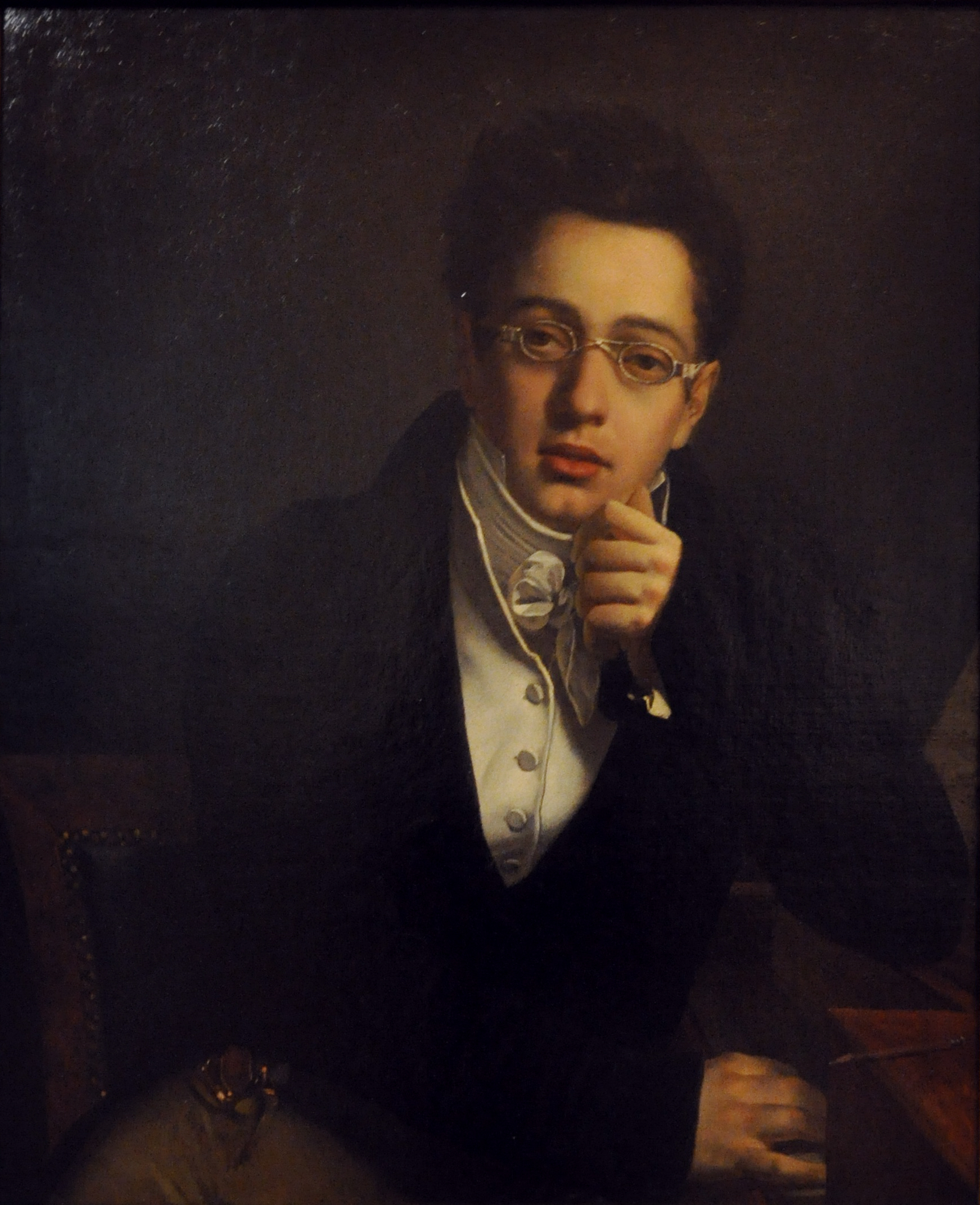
Schubert c. 1814, painted by Josef Abel

The Symphony No. 1 in D major, D. 82, was composed by Franz Schubert in 1813, when he was just 16 years old. Despite his youth, his first symphony is an impressive piece of orchestral music for both its time and size. The first movement opens with a stately Adagio introduction, reminiscent of Joseph Haydn's 104th symphony in its format. The short Adagio sets off a lively Allegro vivace. Like most of Schubert’s early works, the symphony was written during the closing years of the Classical era and adheres closely to the Classical style established by Haydn and Mozart, anticipating the more Romantic idiom of Schubert’s later works.

The symphony is scored for flute, two oboes, two clarinets in A, two bassoons, two horns in D, two trumpets in D, timpani and strings. The orchestration, which is balanced between strings and winds, lends itself to small chamber orchestras, as well as larger ensembles. The trumpets are scored particularly high, as in many of Schubert's early works. Trumpet players will find, in general, the tessitura sitting between D_{4} and A_{5} (as sounded) for most of the first and fourth movements. In the fourth movement, Schubert pushes them up to a high D_{6}, in a repeated fashion. Some careful planning is needed to balance the multiple doublings between horns and trumpets.

The standard four-movement work typically runs about 31 minutes.

1. Adagio – Allegro vivace (530 or 548 bars)
2. Andante in G major (127 bars)
3. Menuetto. Allegro (62 bars + Trio 34 bars)
4. Allegro vivace (366 bars)
