= Der Ring des Polykrates (poem) =

Lyrical ballad written in 1797

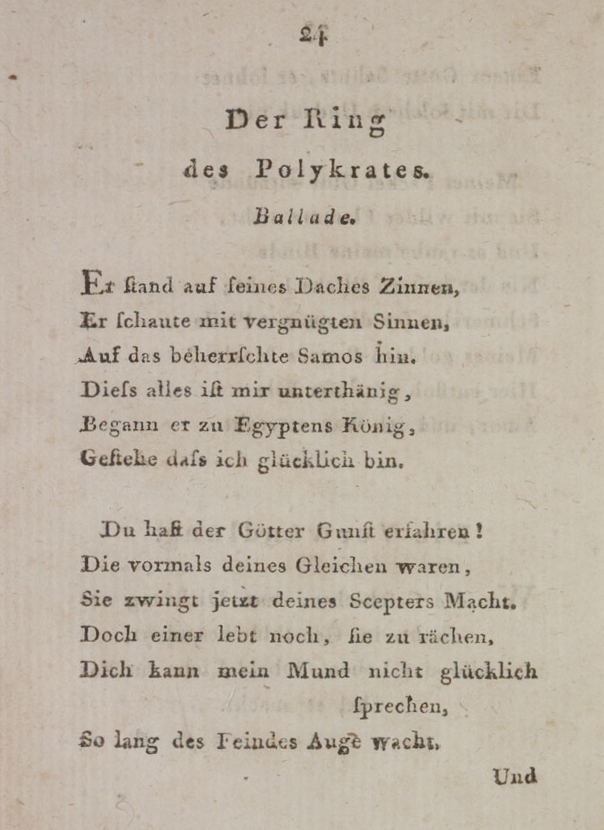
Abstract of Musen-Almanach für das Jahr 1798, Cotta, 1797

"Polycrates' Ring" (German: Der Ring des Polykrates) is a lyrical ballad written in June 1797 by Friedrich Schiller and first published in his 1798 Musen-Almanach annual. It is about how the greatest success gives reason to fear disaster. Schiller relied on the accounts of the fate of Polycrates, tyrant of Samos, in Herodotus' Histories, Book III.

== Synopsis ==
The ballad is set at the court of Polycrates, where he is visited by Pharaoh Amasis II. Polycrates boasts of his victories, while Amasis reminds him of the instability of fortune and prosperity, fearing the divine punishment carried by hubris. All the pharaoh's premonitions soon prove to be erroneous, which only leads him to assume the worst. He advises Polycrates to throw away whatever he valued most in order to escape a reversal of fortune. Polycrates, pondering, follows the advice and throws his most valuable ring into the sea. The next day, a fisherman offers him a large fish and Polycrates' cook discovers the ring inside of it. Amasis, horrified, breaks off their friendship and leaves him right away.

== Musical setting ==
A comic parody of the ballad by the Austrian playwright Heinrich Teweles (1856–1927) became the libretto of the Korngold opera Der Ring des Polykrates, written in 1913/14.

== See also ==
- The Fish and the Ring
