= String Quartet No. 4 (Schubert) =

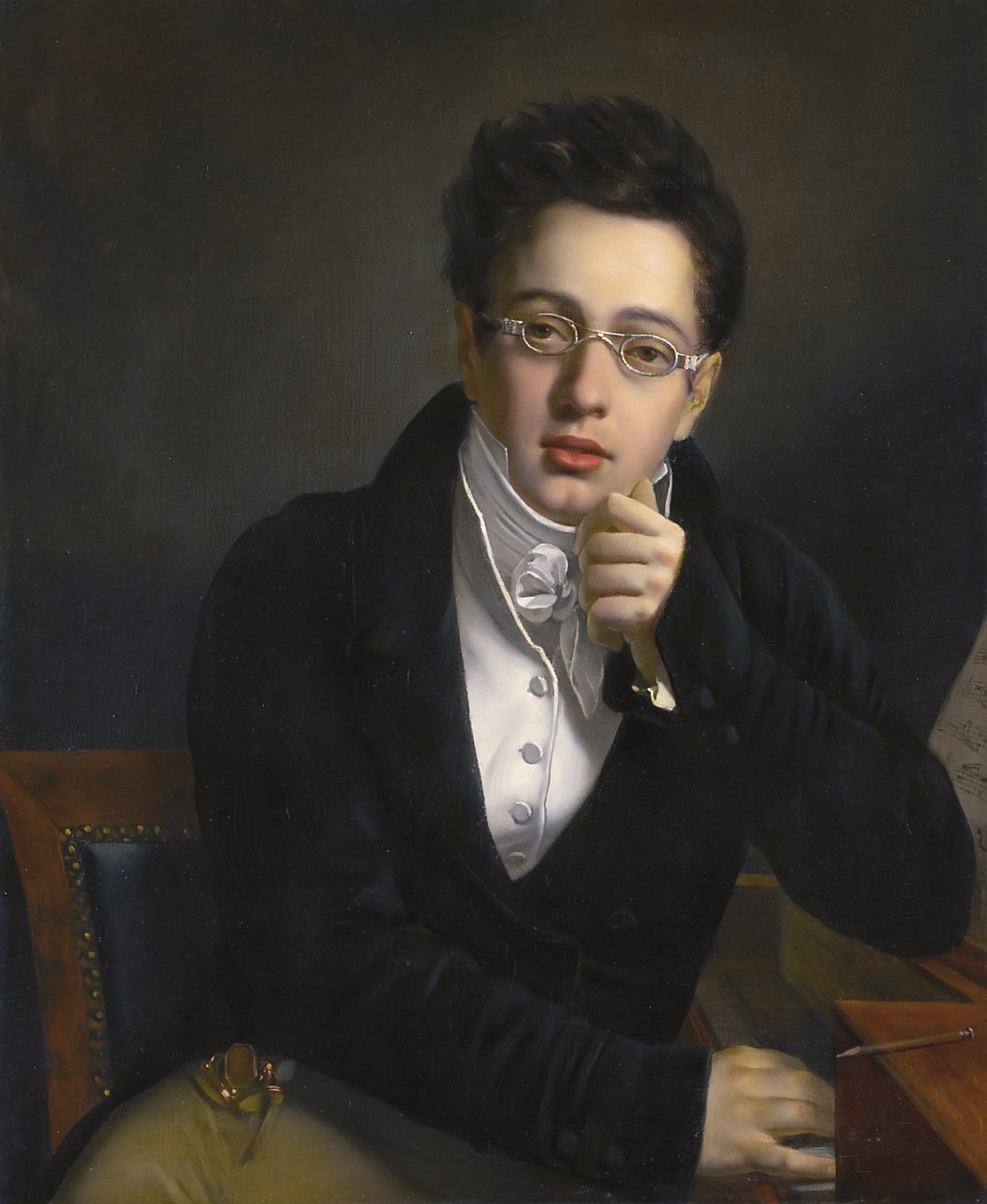
Possible portrait of the young Franz Schubert c. 1814, attributed to Josef Abel

The String Quartet No. 4 (D 46) in C major was composed by Franz Schubert in 1813.

== Movements ==
The string quartet is in four movements:

1. Adagio – Allegro con moto (C major)
2. Andante con moto (G major)
3. Menuetto: Allegro (B♭ major, with Trio in C major)
4. Allegro (C major)

== Sources ==
- Black, Brian (1996). Schubert's Apprenticeship In Sonata Form: The Early String Quartets (PDF) (Ph.D.). McGill University.
- Franz Schubert's Works, Series V: Streichquartette edited by Joseph Hellmesberger and Eusebius Mandyczewski. Breitkopf & Härtel, 1890
- Otto Erich Deutsch (and others). Schubert Thematic Catalogue (several editions), No. 46.
- New Schubert Edition, Series VI, Volume 3: Streichquartette I edited by Martin Chusid. Bärenreiter, 1979.
