= Schubert's symphonies =

Early 19th century musical works

Franz Schubert began thirteen symphonies, seven of which were completed. Up to ten are generally numbered; one of his incomplete symphonies, the Unfinished Symphony, is among his most popular works. Four of the six incomplete symphonies have been completed by other composers.

== Early symphonies ==
By 1818, Schubert had completed 6 symphonies:

- D 82, Symphony No. 1 in D major (1813)
- D 125, Symphony No. 2 in B♭ major (1814–15)
- D 200, Symphony No. 3 in D major (1815)
- D 417, Symphony No. 4 in C minor, Tragic (1816)
- D 485, Symphony No. 5 in B♭ major (1816)
- D 589, Symphony No. 6 in C major, Little C major (1817–18)

There is also an early unfinished symphony:

- D 2B, Symphony in D major [formerly D 997] (1811?, fragment of the first movement is extant)

== Late symphonies ==
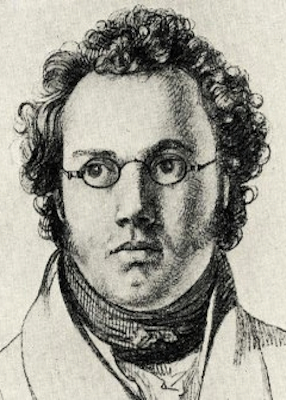
1821 drawing of Franz Schubert by Josef Kupelwieser

Apart from the Great C major (D. 944), all of Schubert's late symphony projects remained unfinished.

- D 615, Sketch of a Symphony in D major (1818, piano sketches of two movements are extant)
- D 708A, Sketch of a Symphony in D major (after 1820, piano sketches of all four movements are extant)
- D 729, Symphony (No. 7) in E major (1821, sketches of all four movements are extant)
- D 759, Symphony (No. 8) in B minor, Unfinished (1822, unfinished – two complete movements and a fragment of a "Scherzo" third movement are extant; the first-act entr'acte from Rosamunde, D 797 No. 1 is possibly the fourth movement)
- D 936A, Sketch of a Symphony (No. 10) in D major (1828?, piano sketches of all three movements are extant)
- D 944, Symphony (No. 9) in C major, Great C major (1825? and 1828, identical to the so-called "Gmunden-Gastein" Symphony, D 849)

Despite the Deutsch number, D 936A is a later work than D 944.

=== Numbering issues ===
Confusion arose quite early over the numbering of Schubert's symphonies, in particular the Great C major Symphony. George Grove, who rediscovered many of Schubert's symphonies, assigned the following numbering after his 1867 visit to Vienna:

- No. 7: E major, D 729 (completely sketched but not entirely scored by Schubert, with multiple historic and modern completions)
- No. 8: B minor, D 759 Unfinished
- No. 9: C major, D 944 Great C major

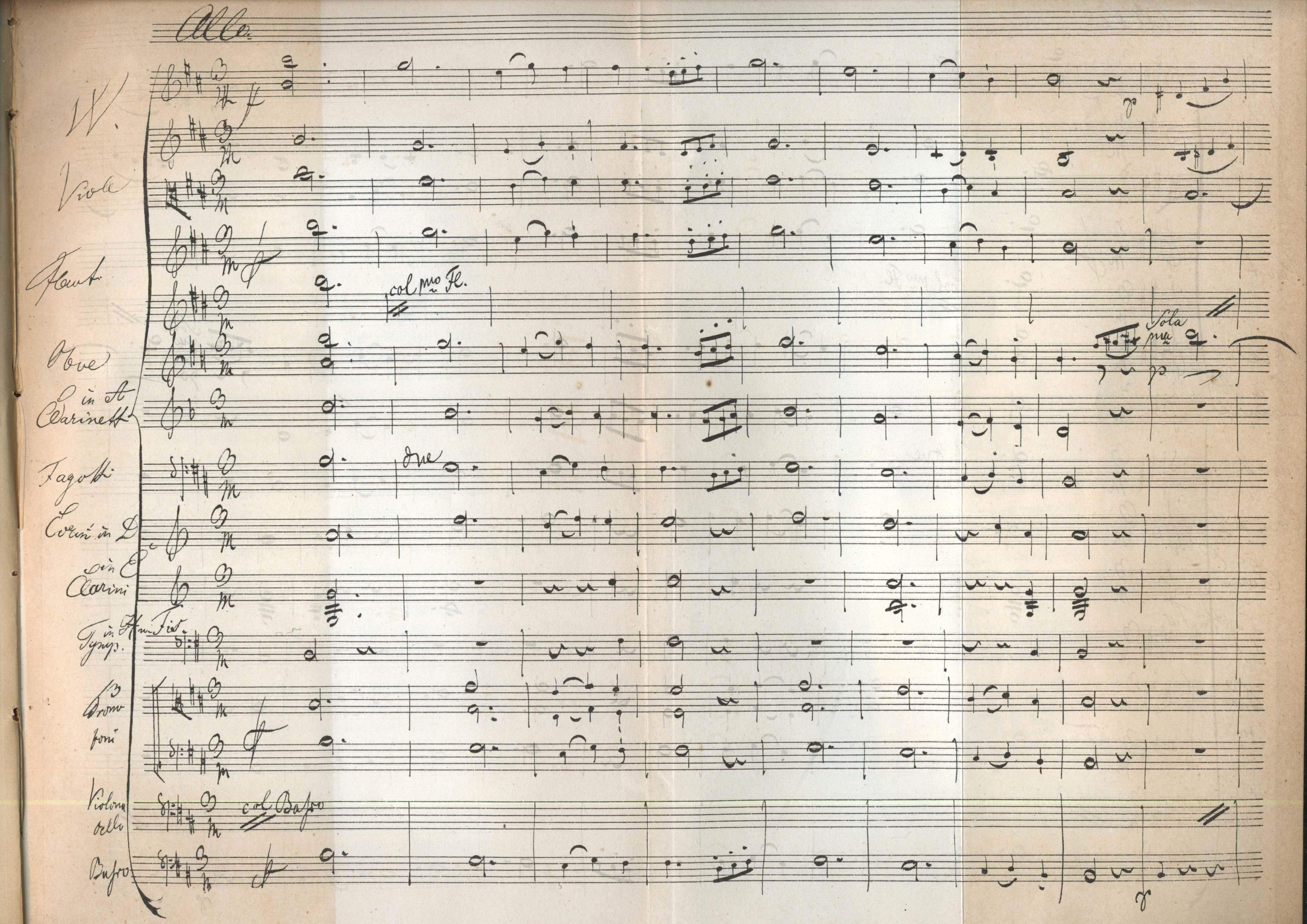
The third movement of Symphony No. 8, first page, facsimile, 1885, in J. R. von Herbeck's biography

Breitkopf & Härtel, when preparing the 1897 complete works publication, originally planned to publish only complete works (which would have given the Great C major No. 7), with "fragments", including the Unfinished and the D 729 sketch, receiving no number at all. When Johannes Brahms became general editor of that project, he assigned the following numbers:

- no number: E major, D 729
- No. 7: C major, D 944 Great C major
- No. 8: B minor, D 759 Unfinished

Some of the disagreement continued into the 20th century. George Grove in his 1908 Dictionary of Music and Musicians, assigned the Great C major as No. 10, and the Unfinished as No. 9 (it is unclear from his article which symphonies, fragmentary or otherwise, are Nos. 7 and 8). The 1978 revision to the Deutsch catalogue leaves the order as follows:

- no number: E major, D 729
- No. 7: B minor, D 759 Unfinished
- No. 8: C major, D 944 Great C major

As a consequence, generally available scores for the later symphonies may be published using conflicting numbers.

Grove and Sullivan also suggested that there may have been a "lost" symphony. Immediately before Schubert's death, his friend Eduard von Bauernfeld recorded the existence of an additional symphony, dated 1828 (although this does not necessarily indicate the year of composition) named the "Letzte" or "Last" symphony. Brian Newbould believes that the "Last" symphony refers to a sketch in D major (D 936A), identified by Ernst Hilmar in 1977, and which was realised by Newbould as the Tenth Symphony. The fragment was bound with other symphony fragments (D 615 and D 708A).

In conclusion, the resulting and most current order followed by the English-speaking world is:

- No. 7: E major, D 729
- No. 8: B minor, D 759 Unfinished
- No. 9: C major, D 944 Great C major
- No. 10: D major, D 936A

=== Completions ===
D 708A, D 729, D 759, and D 936A have been completed by Schubert scholar Brian Newbould. D 729 has additionally been completed by John Francis Barnett and Felix Weingartner. Brian Newbould additionally orchestrated the existing sketches for D 615.

== Sources ==
- Deutsch, Otto Erich; et al. (1978). Franz Schubert, thematisches Verzeichnis seiner Werke in chronologischer Folge. Bärenreiter. ISBN 978-3-7618-0571-8.
- Grove, George; Fuller-Maitland, John Alexander (1908). Grove's Dictionary of Music and Musicians, volume 4. Macmillan. OCLC 407077.
- Lindmayr-Brandl, Andrea (2003). Franz Schubert: Das fragmentarische Werk (in German). Franz Steiner Verlag. ISBN 978-3-515-08250-1.
- Newbould, Brian (1999). Schubert: The Music and the Man. University of California Press. ISBN 9780520219571.

=== Numbering of symphonies ===
The following citations illustrate the confusion around the numbering of Schubert's late symphonies. The B minor Unfinished Symphony is variously published as No. 7 and No. 8, in both German and English. All of these editions appeared to be in print (or at least somewhat readily available) in 2008.

- Schubert, Franz (1996). Symphony, No 7, D 759, B minor, "Unfinished" (in German). Bärenreiter. OCLC 39794412. German-language publication of the Unfinished Symphony score as No. 7.
- Schubert, Franz (2008). Symphony No. 7 in B minor D 759 Unfinished Symphony. Eulenburg Audio+Score Series. Eulenburg. ISBN 978-3-7957-6529-3. English-language publication of the Unfinished Symphony score as No. 7.
- Schubert, Franz; Reichenberger, Teresa (1986). Symphony No. 8 in B minor, D. 759 Unfinished (Paperback). ISBN 978-3-7957-6278-0. English-language publication of the Unfinished Symphony score as No. 8.
