= Unfinished symphony =

Incomplete musical work by a composer

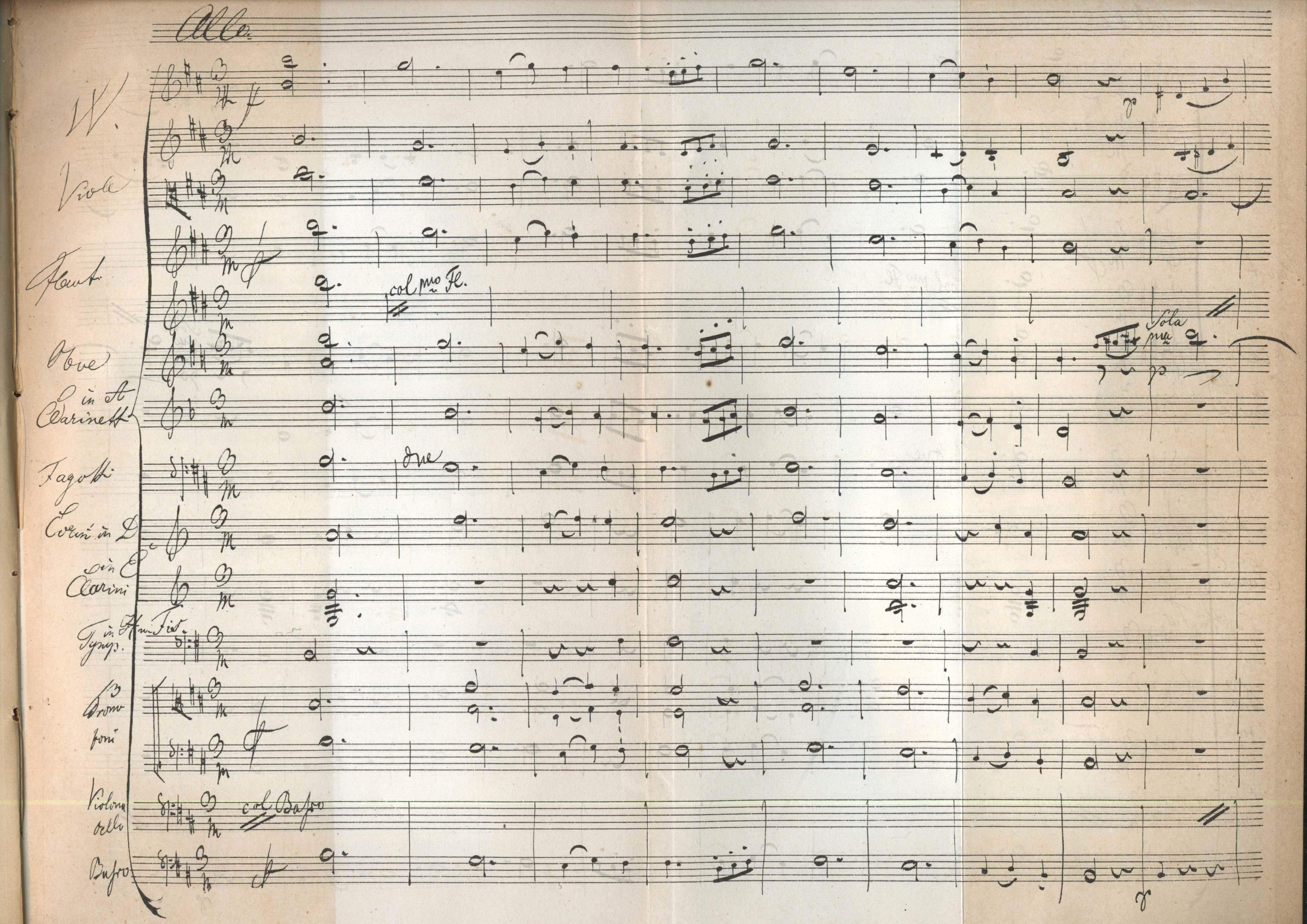
The third movement, first page, facsimile, 1885, of Franz Schubert's Symphony in B minor, D. 759

An unfinished symphony is a fragment of a symphony that is left incomplete. The reason as of why and the state of the sketches themselves can vary considerably. The death of the composer is the most common cause for a symphony to be left unfinished, but it can also be abandoned due to lack of progress, frustration or changes in style, among other issues. Even when a symphony is complete, parts of it may be lost later on, thus technically making the work "unfinished" even if the composer actually finished it. Sketches can range from a few notes and motives, to complete works in short score or unorchestrated manuscripts. When a symphony is left unfinished, it may remain in that state or be completed through various means.

In some cases, another composer may try to finish it, but how depends on case to case. Some attempt to reconstruct the composer's original ideas or follow their style, while others do not. Parts from previous compositions may be reused to complete the work, or the material may be rearranged without adding new music. Some composers expressed their desire for these fragments to be destroyed or hidden from public view. Some symphonies are unfinished but performable, and are simply played in their incomplete state. The archetypal unfinished symphony is Franz Schubert's Symphony No. 8. Other widely known unfinished symphonies are Gustav Mahler's Symphony No. 10 and Anton Bruckner's Symphony No. 9.

== List of unfinished symphonies ==
=== XVIII Century ===
- Joseph Haydn's Symphony in D major (Hob I:106) was composed circa 1769 to 1770. Only the first movement survives, often used as the overture for the opera Le pescatrici.
- Ludwig van Beethoven's Symphony in C minor (Hess 298) was sketched around 1791–93, leaving a small fragment of the first movement before being abandoned. In addition, musicologist and Beethoven specialist Barry Cooper has identified several attempts and sketches of projected symphonies before Beethoven finished his Symphony No. 1 in C major. No completion attempts have been made.

=== XIX Century ===
- Etienne Méhul's Symphony No. 5 in A major was begun in 1810, but left unfinished when he died on 1817. Work on the piece was interrupted by commissions from the wedding between Napoleon and Marie Louise. Afterwards the failure of the 1811 opera Les amazones and tuberculosis took substantial toll on the composer, who probably lacked enough energy to complete a score. The only fragments that remain are of a single movement, an allegro preceded by an andante introduction. This movement was completed by Eric Juteau, and premiered in Nuremberg on 2 November 2013, performed by the Kapella 19 ensemble conducted by Juteau. It was recording the following year alongside other symphonies by Méhul.
- Franz Schubert's Symphony in D major, D 2B, was begun in 1811, leaving it as an incomplete 30-bar orchestral score. The sketch includes the whole slow introduction and the first theme of the Allegro before breaking off. No performing version is yet available.
- Muzio Clementi's four late Symphonies (WO 32–35) were sketched between 1816 and 1822 but left unfinished in various states of completion. They were first identified in 1921 by Georges du Parc Poulain Saint-Foix. The first two (in C major and D major) were completed by Italian composer Alfredo Casella in 1935. He felt that not enough survived of the others (in G major and D major) to enable their reconstruction, but forty years later, Pietro Spada realised completions of them.
- Franz Schubert's Symphony in D major, D 615, it was begun in May 1818, with initial sketches made for the opening sections of the first movement and finale. It was left as an incomplete four-page, 259-bar sketch written for solo piano. Although conductor and composer Brian Newbould has made a performing version of the fragments, a full completion has not yet been attempted.
- Franz Berwald's Symphony in A major, was apparently complete when finished in 1820. It was premiered in Stockholm on March 3 of 1821, being badly received. Only the first movement remains of the piece with some lost sections, most notably the coda. English composer Duncan Druce completed the movement for a recording by Hyperion Records in 1995.
- Franz Schubert's Symphony in D major, D 708A, was sketched between 1820 and 1821, with initial sketches made for the opening sections of the first, second, and fourth movements, and an almost complete sketch for the third movement. In 2012, Newbould was commissioned by BBC Radio 3 to complete the symphony.
- Franz Schubert's Symphony No. 7 in E major, was composed in August 1821. Although the work is structurally complete, Schubert only orchestrated the slow introduction and the first 110 bars of the first movement. The rest of the work is continued on 14-stave score pages as a melodic line with occasional basses or counterpoints, giving clues as to changes in orchestral texture. Completions were made by John Francis Barnett (1881), Felix Weingartner (1934), Brian Newbould (1980) and Richard Dünser (2022).
- Franz Schubert's Symphony No. 8 in B minor "Unfinished" was sketched in 1822, left as two complete movements, a scherzo nearly completed in piano score but with only two pages orchestrated, and no finale. It has been theorized by some musicologists, including Brian Newbould, that Schubert may have sketched a finale that instead became the big B minor entr'acte from his incidental music to Rosamunde, but all evidence for this is circumstantial. Several completions have been made through the years, perhaps being the piece of classical music with the most attempts at being finished.
- Ludwig van Beethoven's Symphony No. 10, a work sketched between 1822 and 1825, and left unfinished when Beethoven died in 1827. Musicologist Barry Cooper made a completion of the first movement. In 2019, artificial intelligence was used to reconstruct the third and fourth movements of the symphony, which premiered on 9 October 2021, titled Beethoven X: The AI Project.
- Mikhail Glinka's Symphonies. Glinka began and left two unfinished single-movement symphonies: A Symphony in B♭ major (1824), and the more known Symphony in D minor, subtitled "On Two Russian themes" (1833). The first was completed by Pyotr Klimov, the second by Vissarion Shebalin. Both have been performed and recorded.
- Franz Schubert's Symphony No. 10 in D major, D 936A, was sketched between October and November 1828, during the last weeks of the composer's short life. The manuscript contains sketches of three movements. Scholars agree that the second movement is virtually completed, while the two outer movements are more fragmentary. According to Brian Newbould, the second and third movements are complete in the sketches, with the first only lacking the recapitulation. It has been orchestrated by Brian Newbould in a completion that has subsequently been performed, published and recorded.
- Robert Schumann's Symphony in G minor "Zwickau" was sketched between October 1832 and May 1833. Schumann finished the first two movements and wrote sketches for a scherzo and a finale before abandoning work on the piece. The first movement was premiered on November 10 of 1832 at Zwickau (where the nickname comes from), conducted by Friedrich Wieck. The piece was not published until 1972 in an adaptation by the Swiss conductor Marc Andreae.
- Norbert Burgmüller's Symphony No. 2, sketched between 1834 and 1835. It was conceived in four movements, only the first two being completed when the composer died in 1836. The third movement was finished and orchestrated by Robert Schumann, who also tried to add a finale of his own. Fragments of the original fourth movement were found in 1983.
- Richard Wagner's Symphony in E major was begun in 1834, being an orchestration of his Grand Piano Sonata in A major (1832). He sketched out the first movement and part of the second before abandoning the work. The manuscript was lost, being found in a second-hand bookshop in Berlin in 1886. His wife Cosima asked Wagner's assistant Felix Mottl to orchestrate the sketches. In addition, several unfinished sketches for at least two other symphonies exist, dating from between 1846 and 1847.
- Robert Schumann's Symphony in C minor (IRS 169), was sketched between 1840 and 1841 but quickly abandoned. The first movement is partly orchestrated but unfinished, the scherzo movement is complete, the other two movements are only in rough draft form. The scherzo was later published in Bunte Blätter, Op. 99, as No. 14.
- Camille Saint-Saëns's left two unfinished symphonies as part of his juvenilia. The Symphony in B♭ major was sketched in 1848, at the age of thirteen and in the same year he joined the Paris Conservatoire. A completed first movement remains consisting of an adagio introduction (27 bars) followed by an allegro molto (220 bars). An andante in E♭ major was left incomplete with 27 bars. These fragments have not been published and no completion has been realised. The Symphony in D major dates from 1850, consisting of an unfinished single-movement andante con moto (46 bars) followed by a vivace assai (149 bars). As the previous one, no publication nor completion are available.
- Georges Bizet's Roma Symphony, is sometimes described as "unfinished", but this is misleading. After eleven years of tinkering (1860–71), with a partial performance in 1869, Bizet could still not produce a version that truly satisfied him. However, the latest version of the symphony was published posthumously in 1880, and is a complete work in the sense that all the movements are fully scored.
- Modest Mussorgsky's Symphony in D major was sketched between 1861 and 1862, left in a fragmentary state and eventually lost.
- Anton Bruckner's Symphony in B♭ major, sketched in October 1869 in two-stave score only. Only the first sixty-eight measures of the opening movement (first and second subject groups of the exposition) were drafted. An arrangement for chamber orchestra was made by Ricardo Luna.
- Hans Rott's Symphony for Strings in A♭ major was composed between 1874 and 1875, finishing the first three movements but leaving the finale uncompleted, with some sketches being extant. the symphony has been recorded, but so for no attempts to complete the finale have been made.
- Sergei Taneyev's Symphony in B♭ was sketched between 1875 and 1878 but left unfinished. The first and third movements were completed, but the andante was left unorchestrated and a projected scherzo wasn't even begun. Taneyev was not satisfied with how the composition was progressing and soon turned his attention to other projects, the symphony remaining unfinished by his death in 1916. Russian composer and musicologist Vladimir Blok, in collaboration with fellow composer Leonid Feigin, edited the completed movements and orchestrated the andante. The completion was then published in 1977 and premiered that same year, performed in Moscow by the USSR Symphony Orchestra of Radio and Television conducted by Vladimir Fedoseyev.
- Joachim Raff's Symphony No. 11 in A minor (subtitled "Winter") was composed in the spring of 1876, but was left without being published nor performed when he died in 1882. In 1883, Raff's friend the conductor Max Erdmannsdörfer, took the manuscript, edited and published it. Raff supposedly left the work finished and Erdmannsdörfer only edited it for publishing. However, since the original score disappeared, we can not be completely sure.
- Hugo Wolf's Symphony in B♭ major was sketched between 1876 and 1877. Apparently the work was written in four movements, but the first and third were lost at the train station in Graz in 1877. The now two-movement piece remained unpublished and unperformed until 1940, 37 years later after Wolf's death.
- Hans Rott's Symphony No. 2 was sketched between 1 January and 4 August 1880, but his mental collapse in October of that year left the work unfinished. No completion attempts have been made.
- Claude Debussy's Symphony in B minor was written between 1880 and 1881 for four-hands piano, he intended to write it in four movements but completed only the first. Debussy sent the manuscript to Nadezhda von Meck and the score was kept in a Russian archive after her death. It was published posthumously by Muzgiz in 1933. The work was never orchestrated by Debussy himself, being arranged for orchestra by Tony Finno.
- Johan Svendsen's Symphony No. 3 was sketched between 1883 and 1884, being destroyed when his first wife Sarah had thrown the only copy in the fire in a fit of rage. However, some sketches were found by conductor Bjarte Engeset in 2007. They were elaborated and orchestrated by Bjørn Morten Christophersen and premiered by the Bergen Philharmonic Orchestra and Engeset in 2011.
- Alexander Borodin's Symphony No. 3, was sketched between 1886 and 1887. It was conceived as a four-movement work complete on the composer's mind, but when he died, only fragments of two movements were found. Alexander Glazunov completed and orchestrated the piece, being published in 1889.
- Anton Bruckner's Symphony No. 9, was composed between 1887 and 1896, leaving the finale unfinished when he died on 1896. There have been a number of completions made of the fourth movement, but most conductors opt to perform and record only the first three.
- Johannes Brahms's Symphony No. 5 in G major, he gave up this project and made use of the themes to complete his String Quintet No.2 in G major, Op. 111.
- Carl Nielsen's Symphony in F major, sketched in 1888, from which only the first movement was finished, which later got the title Symphonic Rhapsody FS 7. It was performed twice, but Nielsen never composed the rest of it. Instead, he started composing what would become his Symphony No. 1 in G minor, which is famous for being the first symphony in history that employed the use of progressive tonality.
- Charles Gounod's Symphony No. 3 in C major was sketched between 1890 and 1892, managing to finish the slow introduction of the first movement and the whole second movement. These fragments were recorded for the first time in 2014 for the CPO label.
- Pyotr Ilyich Tchaikovsky's Symphony No. 7 in E♭ major, was sketched between 1891 and 1892, but Tchaikovsky was dissatisfied and abandoned it. The material was reworked in 1893 as his Piano Concerto No. 3, Op. 75 and Andante and Finale, Op. 79. A reconstruction of the original symphony from the sketches and various reworkings was made between 1951 and 1955 by Soviet composer Semyon Bogatyrev. In 2005, a second reconstruction, commissioned by the Tchaikovsky Fund, was completed by Russian composer Pyotr Klimov.

=== XX Century ===
- Béla Bartók's Symphony in E♭ major was sketched in 1902, left in a fragmentary state with the exception of the third movement, a scherzo that was performed on February 29 of 1904 by the Hungarian Royal Opera House Orchestra conducted by István Kerner. It was reconstructed by Belgian musicologist Denijs Dille, being premiered in its entirety in a radio broadcast on October 30 of 1968, performed by the Budapest Symphony Orchestra conducted by György Lehel.
- Edvard Grieg's Symphony No. 2, subtitled "In Spring", was left as sketches when he died in 1907. No completion attempts have been made.
- Arnold Bax's Symphony in F major was composed in 1907 but left as a piano score, being dissatisfied with it. It was orchestrated by Martin Yates, being performed and recorded for the Dutton Epoch label.
- Alexander Glazunov's Symphony No. 9 in D minor was begun in 1910 but remained unfinished when he died in 1936, only being able to finish the first movement in short score. It was given to Rimsky-Korsakov's son-in-law Maximilian Steinberg in 1928, and in 1947 it was orchestrated by Gavril Yudin.
- Gustav Mahler's Symphony No. 10, sketched between 1910 and 1911, and left as a continuous draft of this five-movement work, with the first and third movements more or less fully scored. These two movements (Adagio and Purgatorio) were prepared for publication by Franz Schalk and Ernst Krenek in 1924. Various orchestrations and performing editions of the entire symphony have been made since the 1960s, including that of Deryck Cooke (1960–64), subsequently revised with input from Berthold Goldschmidt, Colin Matthews and David Matthews and a sparer, brass-prominent version by Joseph Wheeler.
- Charles Ives' Universe Symphony, a composition which Ives worked on periodically between 1911 and 1928. During the 1980s and 1990s, there were three separate performing versions assembled, including a version by David Gray Porter (1993), Larry Austin (1994), and Johnny Reinhard (1996).
- Wilhelm Stenhammar's Symphony No. 3 in C major, was sketched between 1918 and 1919, left as a draft of a first movement (including a seven-page fragment in full score) and sketches of three other movements. The full-score fragment of the first movement was edited with a concert ending by Tommy B. Andersson and first performed in 1991.
- Jean Sibelius' Symphony No. 8, was sketched intermittently from the mid-1920s until around 1938. A fair copy of at least the first movement was made, but how much of the symphony was completed is unknown. Sibelius repeatedly refused to release it for performance, though he continued to assert that he was working on it even after he had, according to later reports from his family, burned the score and associated material, probably in 1945.
- George Enescu's Symphony No. 4 in E minor was intermittently composed between 1928 and 1939, but left unfinished after the composer's death in 1955. It was completed by Romanian composer Pascal Bentoiu in 1996, being premiered in Bucharest on October 2 of 1997, performed by the George Enescu Philharmonic Orchestra conducted by Cristian Mandeal. It has been recorded for the CPO label in 2015.
- Edward Elgar's Symphony No. 3 in C minor, Op. 88. It was sketched between 1932 and 1934, being left in a very fragmentary state when the composer died in 1934. Anthony Payne discovered these fragments at the beginning of the 1970s, and made a completion of the work between 1993 and 1997, which has been recorded several times.
- Gustav Holst's Symphony was sketched between 1933 and 1934, but his death left the work unfinished. If finished, it would have been his third after the Cotswolds Symphony and the First Choral Symphony. The scherzo (H192) of the incomplete symphony has been performed, published and recorded as an independent piece. In addition, Holst began planning a 'Second Choral Symphony', based on poems by George Meredith, but only made some initial fragmentary sketches. No completion attempts have been made for either of these works.
- Erkki Melartin's last three symphonies were sketched between 1935 and 1937, left unfinished on the composer's death. Symphony No. 7 (subtitled "Sinfonia gaia") was partially completed, No. 8 was left in a fragmentary state and No. 9 was apparently barely even begun apart from some structural plans. So far no completion attempts have been made of any of them.
- Wilhelm Peterson-Berger's Symphony No. 6 was sketched between 1935 and 1938, subtitled "Hellas" (Greece) and left unfinished after the composer's death on December 3 of 1942. The piece has not received any completion attempts as of now.
- Louis Vierne's Organ Symphony No. 7 in C minor was begun briefly before his death on 2 June 1937, leaving unfinished sketches. No completion attempts have been made.
- Ernest John Moeran's Symphony No. 2 in E♭ major, was sketched between 1939 and 1950. He began with a four-movement idea of the work, but in 1947 switched to a single-movement form, still remaining full of doubts. When he died in 1950, his widow, the cellist Peers Coetmore, took the sketches with her to Australia, where they still reside. The manuscript of that work and various others were donated to the Victorian College of the Arts in Melbourne. Conductor Martin Yates realised the work, it was recorded for a Dutton release and then publicly premiered with the BBC Concert Orchestra in 2011.
- George Enescu's Symphony No.5 in D major was sketched and partially orchestrated between 1941 and 1946. As with the fourth symphony, it was left unfinished after the composer's death in 1955. Romanian composer Cornel Țăranu completed the first movement in 1972 and orchestrated the finale. Pascal Bentoiu was brought in by Țăranu and finished the completion in the nineties. The work was premiered in Bucharest on the opening concert of the 1996–97 season, performed by the Romanian National Orchestra and Radio Choir, with Florin Diaconescu as tenor soloist and conducted by Horia Andreescu. It was recorded for the CPO label in 2014.
- Joaquín Turina's Sinfonía del mar (Sea Symphony) was begun in 1945 but left uninished after his death in 1949. Spanish composer Manuel Castillo orchestrated the first movements in 1981, being premiered on March 18 of 1982, performed by the Spanish National Orchestra conducted by Benito Lauret. The third movement remains in a fragmentary state, and so far no completions have been made.
- Hisatada Otaka's Symphony No. 1 was composed circa 1948 to 1949, but only the first movement was performed on November 25 of 1948, performed by the Nippon Symphony Orchestra conducted by the composer. The movement was published in 1949, but the supposedly rest of the symphony remained in mystery after the composer's death in 1951. The second movement was discovered and performed (along with the first) on September 2 of 2006, performed by the NHK Symphony Orchestra conducted by Yuzo Toyama. The symphony must contain more than two movements, because at the end of the second is labelled with attacca, implying that there are more movements either lost or not written. The symphony also has no relation to the Japanese Peace Bell as that was created after Otaka's death, however was made with a description of "Praying for world peace.", referencing World War II, and the atomic bombings of Hiroshima and Nagasaki.
- Allan Pettersson's Symphonies No. 1 and 17. No. 1 was begun in 1951, Pettersson wrote a substantial amount of material before he became disaffected with the piece. However, through his life, Pettersson returned to the score several times despite being unable to finish it. Symphony No. 17 was apparently begun in 1979, leaving a fragment of only 207 bars before he died on 20 June 1980. Both works were completed by Christian Lindberg.
- York Bowen's Symphony No. 4 in G major was left unfinished when he died in 1961. No completion attempts have been made.
- Gavriil Popov's Symphony No. 7 was begun in 1970, but left unfinished when he died in 1972. No completion attempts have been made.
- Georges Hugon's Symphony No. 3 was sketched circa 1975 to 1980, but left unfinished after his death. It was subtitled "Prométhée" (Prometheus), and the current state of the work is unknown, with no completion attempts on the horizon.
- Eduard Tubin's Symphony No. 11, was sketched in 1982 shortly before the composer died. The score contains a partially orchestrated first movement and the opening ten bars of a second movement. The orchestration of the first movement was completed by Kaljo Raid in 1987 and this movement has been performed and recorded several times.
- Ikuma Dan's Symphony No.7 was begun after finished the sixth in 1985, being sketched until the composer's death in 2001 left the work unfinished. Subtitled "Jashūmon" (Heretics), it was conceived as a vocal symphony on the poem of the same title by Hakushū Kitahara. The state of these sketches are unknown, and so far no completions have been attempted.
- Edmund Rubbra's Symphony No. 12 was begun on 1986 before his death that same year, leaving an unfinished opening draft.
- Boudewijn Buckinx's Symphonies. In the years 1991–92 this postmodern Belgian composer composed nine unfinished symphonies (which premiered in 1993).
- Stephen Albert's Symphony No. 2 was composed in 1992, but his death in a car accident left the piece as a manuscript of 67 pages. The composer was orchestrating the piece, and the publisher G. Schirmer asked composer Sebastian Currier, a close friend of Albert, if he could finish the piece, a request he accepted. It was finished in 1994.
- Mieczysław Weinberg's Symphony No. 22 was finished in a piano score when he died on 26 February 1996, unable to orchestrate it. Weinberg's wife Olya suggested to Kirill Umansky that he might orchestrate the score. Immersing himself in Weinberg's symphonic music, Umansky completed the orchestration and the first performance was given by the Belgorod State Philharmonic Orchestra in 2003.
- Alfred Schnittke's Symphony No. 9 was composed between 1996 and 1998. Despite being finished, the score was barely readable and needed to be deciphered. Russian conductor Gennady Rozhdestvensky made a performable version but was rejected by Schnittke. Russian–Canadian composer Nikolai Korndorf began a second attempt before dying in 2001. Finally, Russian composer Alexander Raskatov made the final version that was premiered in Dresden on 16 June 2007, with the Dresden Philharmonic Orchestra conducted by Dennis Russell Davis. Raskatov also wrote his own composition: Nunc dimittis — In memoriam Alfred Schnittke intended as a finale to the piece.

=== XXI Century ===
- Richard Arnell's Symphony No. 7 "Mandela", Op. 201, was sketched between 1996 and 2009. After his death in 2009, the piece was completed by Martin Yates. It was recorded in the summer of 2010 by Yates and the Royal Scottish National Orchestra and was issued by Dutton Epoch.
- Nguyễn Lân Tuất's Symphony No. 5 was begun in 2013 but left unfinished after the composer's death in 2014. It was subtitled "Đời nghệ sĩ" (Artist's life) and its current status is unknown, no completions apparently being made.
- David Maslanka’s Symphony No. 10 was sketched in 2017 until the composer's death in the same year. The first movement and half of the second were completed. At the composer's urging, his son Matthew then finished the remainder of the work based on his sketches. The second and fourth movements were completed based upon detailed sketches by the composer; the third movement, inspired by less finished sketches, was composed primarily by Matthew.
- Krzysztof Penderecki's Symphony No. 9. On several occasions, through articles and interviews, the Polish composer expressed his intentions on writing a final work before his death: his Ninth Symphony or another Passion. Penderecki said he had lots of 'absolutely different' sketches made for a Ninth Symphony but was not sure he would use any of them. His death on 2020 has presumably left the piece in a fragmentary state. So far no attempts of completions have been made.
- Jaakko Kuusisto's Symphony Op. 39 was sketched between 2020 and 2021 but his death due to a brain tumour left the piece far from being finished. There were just ten minutes' worth of material across its two movements. His widow Maija then recruited Jaakko's two closest collaborators; Pekka Kuusisto and Jari Eskola, to complete the work. The piece was then performed and recorded by the BIS label.

== See also ==
- Curse of the ninth
- List of symphonies with names
