= List of compositions by Franz Schubert (1821) =

Franz Schubert's compositions of 1821 are mostly in the Deutsch catalogue (D) range D 708A–732, and include:

- Instrumental works:
  - Symphony No. 7, D 728
- Vocal music:
  - Alfonso und Estrella, D 732 (composition started in September 1821)

== Table ==
=== Legend ===
Legend to the table
column		content
1	D '51	Deutsch number in the first version of the Deutsch catalogue (1951)
2	D utd	most recent (utd = up to date) Deutsch catalogue number; the basic collation of the list is according to these numbers – whether or not the possibility to adjust the sorting according to the content of other columns is available depends on the device with which the table is displayed.
3	Op. pbl	Opus number (Op.; p indicates Post. = posthumous) and date of first publication (pbl; between brackets; when there is more than one date the earlier dates indicate partial publications). The column sorts to Opus number, then (earliest of) the publication date(s)
4	AGA	Alte Gesamt-Ausgabe = Franz Schubert's Werke: Kritisch durchgesehene Gesammtausgabe. Indicates genre/instrumentation: Series I: Symphonien (Nos. 1-8) (Johannes Brahms, 1884); Series II: Overtüren und Andere Orchesterwerke (Johann Nepomuk Fuchs, 1886); Series III: Oktette (Nos. 1-3) and IV: Streichquintett (Eusebius Mandyczewski, 1889); Series V: Streichquartette (Nos. 1-15) (Joseph Hellmesberger and Eusebius Mandyczewski, 1890); Series VI: Trio für Streichinstrumente (Eusebius Mandyczewski, 1892); Series VII: Trios, Quartets and Quintets with Piano and VIII: Pianoforte und Ein Instrument (Ignaz Brüll, 1886); Series IX: Pianoforte zu vier Händen (Anton Door, 1888); Series X: Sonaten für Pianoforte (Julius Epstein, 1888); Series XI: Fantasie, Impromptus und andere Stücke für Pianoforte (Julius Epstein, 1888); Series XII: Tänze für Pianoforte (Nos. 1-31) (Julius Epstein, 1889); Series XIII: Messen (Nos. 1-7) (Eusebius Mandyczewski, 1887); Series XIV: Kleinere Kirchenmusikwerke (Nos. 1-22) (Eusebius Mandyczewski, 1888); Series XV: Dramatische Musik (Johann Nepomuk Fuchs, 1893); Series XVI: Werke für Männerchor (Nos. 1-46) (Eusebius Mandyczewski, 1891); Series XVII: Werke für gemischten Chor (Nos. 1-19) (Josef Gänsbacher, Eusebius Mandyczewski, 1892); Series XVIII: Werke für Drei und mehr Frauenstimmen mit Pianoforte-Begleitung (Nos. 1-6) (Josef Gänsbacher, Eusebius Mandyczewski, 1891); Series XIX: Kleine Gesangswerke (Nos. 1-36) (Josef Gänsbacher and Eusebius Mandyczewski, 1892); Series XX: Sämtliche einstimmige Lieder und Gesänge (Eusebius Mandyczewski, 1894-1895); Series XXI: Supplement (Eusebius Mandyczewski, 1897); 1. Instrumentalmusik No. 1-5; 2. Instrumentalmusik No. 6-13; 3. Instrumentalmusik No. 14-; 4. Gesangsmusik; Series XXII: Revisionsbericht
5	NSA	NGA/NSA/NSE = New Schubert Edition, also indicates genre/instrumentation: Series I: Church Music; Series II: Stage Works; Series III: Part Songs; Series IV: Lieder; Series V: Orchestral Works; Series VI: Chamber Music; 1. Octet and Nonet; 2. String Quintet; 3. String Quartets I; 4. String Quartets II; 5. String Quartets III; 6. String Trios; 7. Works for Piano and several instruments; 8. Works for Piano and one instrument; 9. Dances for several instruments; Series VII: Piano Music; 1. Works for Piano Four Hands; 2. Works for Piano Two Hands; Series VIII: Supplement, 2. Schubert's Studies
6	Name	unique name, with, if available, a link to the relevant encyclopedia article; sorts by name with initial definite ("Der", "Die", "Das", ...) or indefinite ("Ein", "A", ...) articles, and numbers, moved after the expression they qualify: e.g. "Die Hoffnung, ..." sorts as "Hoffnung, Die, ..." – "Thirty Minuets ..." sorts as "Minuets, 30, ...".
7	Key / incipit	incipit mostly for songs (linking to lyrics and their translation, for instance at The LiederNet Archive, when available), other compositions by key, except for Schubert's stage works: type of composition in brackets.
8	Date	(presumed) date of composition, or, for copies and arrangements, date of Schubert's autograph. Sorts to earliest possible date of completion, unlike the chronology of the Deutsch catalogue that generally collates according to earliest date associated with the composition: e.g. Schubert started the composition of his 3rd String Quartet on 19 November 1812 and completed it on 21 February 1813 – in the Deutsch catalogue the composition is grouped with other compositions from 1812: when using the sort function of the 8th column the composition is grouped with compositions completed in 1813
9	Additional info	may include: Information about the text (lyrics, libretto) of vocal compositions: e.g., "Text by [text author]", "Text: [standard lyrics]", "... from [literary work]"; "other settings: D ..." indicates Schubert's other settings of the same text; for fields starting with "Text ..." this column sorts by text author (last name, first name—or pen name when such name is more established), then incipit of the lyrics (alternatively, when the incipit is rarely used, title of the work); Information about the authenticity of the composition: the work is without doubt Schubert's unless when marked as "Doubtful", "Spurious?" or "Spurious" (in the last case columns 3–8 give no further information about the composition); Forces needed for performance ("For ..."): may be omitted when the type of composition makes the instrumentation clear (e.g. String Quartet → two violins, viola and cello), and, for vocal music, when the setting is for voice and piano; "s", "a", "t" and "b" refer to a single soprano, alto, tenor and bass singer respectively, while "S", "A", "T" and "B" to choral parts for the same types of singers (see SATB).; Specifications regarding movements (e.g. "Allegro – Minuet – Rondo") or sections (e.g. "No. 1 ..."); Information about the completeness of the extant work: the work is considered complete as extant unless when marked "Sketch", "Incomplete", "Unfinished", "Fragment" or "Lost"; Information about versions (e.g. "Two versions: ...")

=== List ===
Compositions by Franz Schubert listed in the Deutsch catalogue for 1821
D '51	D utd	Op. pbl	AGA	NSA	Name	Key / incipit	Date	Additional info
615	708A			V, 6 No. 10	Symphony, D 708A	D major	1821 or later	Sketches of four movements
709	709	(1891)	XVI; No. 31	III, 4 No. 47	Frühlingsgesang, D 709	Schmücket die Locken mit duftigen Kränzen	March 1822 or earlier	Text by Schober (other setting, partly reusing music of this setting: D 740); For ttbb
710	710	(1849)	XVI; No. 15	III, 3 No. 26	Im Gegenwärtigen Vergangenes	Ros und Lilie morgentaulich	March 1821?	Text by Goethe; For ttbb and piano
711	711	13,2 (1822) (1970)	XX, 5 No. 294	IV, 1a & b No. 11	Lob der Tränen	Laue Lüfte, Blumendüfte	1818–1821?	Text by Schlegel, A. W.; Two versions: 2nd, in AGA, is Op. 13 No. 2
712	712	(1842)	XX, 6 No. 389	IV, 13	Die gefangenen Sänger	Hörst du von den Nachtigallen	January; 1821	Text by Schlegel, A. W.
713	713	87,1 (1827) (1895)	XX, 6 No. 390	IV, 4	Der Unglückliche	Die Nacht bricht an	January; 1821	Text by Pichler; Two versions: 2nd is Op. 87 No. 1
714; 704	714	167p (1858) (1891)	XVI; No. 3 & No. 45	III, 1	Gesang der Geister über den Wassern, D 714	Des Menschen Seele gleicht dem Wasser	Dec. 1820– Feb. 1821	Text by Goethe (other settings: D 484, 538 and 705); For ttttbbbb, two violas, two cellos and double bass; Two versions: 1st, a sketch, was D 704 – 2nd is Op. posth. 167
715	715	(1845)	XX, 6 No. 391	IV, 13	Versunken	Voll Locken kraus ein Haupt so rund	February; 1821	Text by Goethe
716	716	(1832)	XX, 6 No. 393	IV, 13	Grenzen der Menschheit	Wenn der uralte heilige Vater	March 1821	Text by Goethe; For b and piano
717	717	31 (1825)	XX, 6 No. 397	IV, 2a	Suleika II	Ach um deine feuchten Schwingen	March? 1821	Text by Willemer
718	718	(1824)	XI No. 8	VII/2, 4	Variation on a Waltz by Anton Diabelli	C minor	March 1821	For piano; No. 38 in Vaterländischer Künstlerverein Vol. II
719	719	14,2 (1822)	XX, 6 No. 392	IV, 1a	Geheimes	Über meines Liebchens Äugeln	March 1821	Text by Goethe
720	720	14,1 (1822)	XX, 6 No. 396	IV, 1a & b No. 13	Suleika I	Was bedeutet die Bewegung?	March 1821	Text by Willemer; Two versions; 2nd, in AGA, is Op. 14 No. 1
721	721	(1895)	XX, 10; No. 600	IV, 13	Mahomets Gesang, D 721	Seht den Felsenquell	March 1821	Text by Goethe (other setting: D 549); For b and piano; Fragment
722	722	(1889)	XII; No. 19	VII/2, 6	German Dance, D 722	G♭ major	8/3/1821	For piano
723	723	(1893)	XV, 7 No. 15	II, 18	Duet and Aria for Hérold's Das Zauberglöckchen	Nein, nein, nein, nein, das ist zu viel – Der Tag entflieht, der Abend glüht	Apr.–May; 1821	Text by Théaulon, transl. by Treitschke;Duet for tb and aria for t (both with orchestra)
724	724	11,2 (1822)	XVI; No. 5	III, 3 No. 27	Die Nachtigall	Bescheiden verborgen im buschigten Gang	22/4/1821 or earlier	Text by Unger; For ttbb and piano
725	725	(1929)		III, 2b Anh. No. 5	Duet, D 725	Linde Lüfte wehen, or: Linde Weste wehen	April 1821	Fragment for mezzo-soprano, tenor and piano
726	726	(1870)	XX, 6 No. 394	IV, 3	Mignon I, D 726	Heiß mich nicht reden	April 1821	Text by Goethe, from Wilhelm Meister's Apprenticeship (other setting: D 877 No. 2)
727	727	(1850)	XX, 6 No. 395	IV, 3	Mignon II, D 727	So laßt mich scheinen, bis ich werde	April 1821	Text by Goethe, from Wilhelm Meister's Apprenticeship (other settings: D 469 and 877 No. 3)
728	728	(1895)	XX, 10; No. 601	IV, 13	Johanna Sebus	Der Damm zerreißt	April 1821	Text by Goethe; Fragment
729	729	(1894) (1934)		V, 6 No. 7 & Anh 1	Symphony No. 7	E major	August; 1821	Adagio, Allegro – Andante – Scherzo – Allegro giusto; Sketches; First editions are completions by others (piano reduction in 1894)
730	730	(1926)		I, 9 No. 8	Tantum ergo, D 730	B♭ major	16/8/1821	Text by Aquinas (other settings: D 460, 461, 739, 750, 962 and Anh. I/17); For satbSATB and orchestra
731	731	173p,4 (1821)	XX, 6 No. 399	IV, 5	Der Blumen Schmerz	Wie tönt es mir so schaurig	September; 1821	Text by Majláth; Publ. as Op. posth. 173 No. 4 in 1867
732; 683	732	(1833) (1834) (1867) (1882) (1892)	XV, 4 No. 8 (Ov.); XV, 5 No. 9	II, 6a–c IV, 14	Alfonso und Estrella	(Opera in three acts)	20/9/1821– 27/2/1822	Text by Schober; For two sopranos, two tenors, bass, two baritones, SATB and orchestra (piano reduction in 1882 publ.); Overture (also used as overture to D 797, publ. 1867, piano reductions: D 759A and 773) – Act I: Nos. 1–10 (No. 8 publ. 1833 with piano reduction) – Act II: Nos. 11–22 (No. 11 was also D 683 and some of its music reappears in No. 19 of D 911, No. 13 publ. 1834 with piano reduction) – Act III: Nos. 23–34

== Sources ==
Multi-volume editions, websites and catalogues

- Alte Gesamt-Ausgabe (AGA) = Franz Schubert's Works: Schubert, Franz (1884–1897). Johannes Brahms; Ignaz Brüll; Anton Door; Julius Epstein; Johann Nepomuk Fuchs; Josef Gänsbacher; Joseph Hellmesberger Sr.; Eusebius Mandyczewski (eds.). Franz Schubert's Werke: Kritisch durchgesehene Gesammtausgabe (in German). Leipzig: Breitkopf & Härtel. Reprints of several volumes by Kalmus and Dover Publications; Franz Schubert's Werke (Series I–XIX and XXI), Series XX, Revisionsbericht: Scores at the International Music Score Library Project
- Deutsch catalogue (D) = Schubert Thematic Catalogue:
  - Deutsch, Otto Erich; et al. (Donald R. Wakeling) (1951). Schubert: Thematic Catalogue of all his Works in Chronological Order (1st ed.). London: Dent. 1995 reprint, with errata correction: Deutsch, Otto Erich; et al. (Donald R. Wakeling) (1995). The Schubert Thematic Catalogue (Dover ed.). Mineola, N.Y.: Dover Publications. ISBN 0486286851.
  - Deutsch, Otto Erich (1978). Walther Dürr; Arnold Feil; Christa Landon [in German]; Werner Aderhold (eds.). Franz Schubert: Thematisches Verzeichnis seiner Werke in chronologischer Folge. New Schubert Edition (in German). Kassel: Bärenreiter. ISBN 9783761805718. ISMN 9790006305148.
    - Series VIII (Supplement)
    - Volume 4
- Hoboken catalogue (Hob.): "Joseph Haydn (1732–1809): Werke sortiert nach Hob (Hoboken-Verzeichnis, 1957-78)" (in German). Kaiserslautern: Klassika.
- Köchel catalogue (K.): "Wolfgang Amadeus Mozart (1756–1791): Werke sortiert nach KV^{6} (Köchel-Verzeichnis, 6. Auflage, 1964)" (in German). Kaiserslautern: Klassika.
- Neue Schubert-Ausgabe (NSA) = New Schubert Edition:
  - NSA scores: Schubert, Franz (1968–2019). International Schubert Association (Tübingen) (ed.). Franz Schubert (1797–1828): New Edition of the Complete Works (in German). Kassel: Bärenreiter. [over 80 volumes in eight series] Individual volumes:
    - NSA II, 15: Schubert, Franz; Neumann, Johann Philipp (2008). Jahrmärker, Manuela; Aigner, Thomas (eds.). Sacontala. New Schubert Edition (in German). Kassel: Bärenreiter. ISMN 9790006497294.
      - Series II (Stage Works), Vol. 15
    - NSA VIII, 4: See above Deutsch (1978)
  - NSA website: "New Schubert Edition". Tübingen: International Schubert Association.
- Schubert Online: "www.schubert-online.at: Schubert music manuscripts, first and early editions online". Vienna: Austrian Academy of Sciences (ÖAW).
- The LiederNet Archive: Ezust, Emily; et al. (LiederNet contributors). "Composer: Franz Peter Schubert (1797 - 1828)". Ontario: LiederNet Corporation.

Other

- Badura-Skoda, Eva; Branscombe, Peter, eds. (2008). Schubert Studies: Problems of Style and Chronology. Cambridge University Press. ISBN 0521088720.
  - Walther Dürr "Schubert's Songs and Their Poetry" pp. 1–24
  - Rufus Hallmark "Schubert's 'Auf dem Strom'" pp. 25–46
  - Elaine Brody "Schubert and Sulzer Revisited" pp. 47–60
  - Marius Flothuis "Schubert Revises Schubert" pp. 61–84
  - Elizabeth Norman McKay "Schubert as Composer of Operas" pp. 85–104
  - Peter Branscombe "Schubert and the Melodrama" pp. 105–142
  - Christoph Wolff "Schubert's 'Der Tod und dad Mädchen'" pp. 143–172
  - Peter Gülke on String Quintet D 956 pp. 173–186
  - Paul Badura-Skoda on Schubert's 'Great' C major Symphony pp. 187–208
  - Robert Winter "Paper Studies and the Future of Schubert Research" pp. 209–276
  - Eva Badura-Skoda "The Chronology of Schubert's Piano Trios" pp. 277–296
  - Reinhard Van Hoorickx "The Chronology of Schubert's Fragments and Sketches" pp. 297–326
  - Arnold Feil "Rhythm in Schubert" pp. 327–346
  - Alexander Weinmann on Leopold Puschl and Schubert's sojourn in Zseliz pp. 347–356
- Elsholz, Gunter (1982). Vogel, Reimut (ed.). Franz Schubert: Sinfonie in E-Dur 1825. Stuttgart: Goldoni. ISBN 3922044050. OCLC 987719669.
- Hilmar, Ernst; Jestremski, Margret, eds. (2004). Schubert-Enzyklopädie (in German). Vol. 1. Introduction by Alfred Brendel. Tutzing: Hans Schneider. ISBN 3795211557.
- Keefe, Simon P., ed. (2006). Mozart Studies. Cambridge University Press. ISBN 0521851025.
- Kube, Michael (2009). "Franz Schuberts Deutsche Trauermesse (D 621) als Problem der Text- und Stilkritik". In Mitterauer, Gertraud; Müller, Ulrich; Springeth, Margarete; Vitzthum, Verena (eds.). Was ist Textkritik?: Zur Geschichte und Relevanz eines Zentralbegriffs der Editionswissenschaft (in German). Walter de Gruyter. pp. 129–140. ISBN 3484970782.
- Mozart, Wolfgang Amadeus; Haydn, Joseph; Haydn, Michael (2008). Kircher, Armin (ed.). Chorbuch Mozart • Haydn VII: Kanonsammlung [Choral Collection Mozart • Haydn, Vol. VII: Canon Collection] (in German, Latin, English, and Italian). Stuttgart: Carus-Verlag. OCLC 274222567.
- Newbould, Brian (1999). Schubert: The Music and the Man. University of California Press. ISBN 0520219570.
- Reed, John (1997). The Schubert Song Companion. Manchester University Press. ISBN 1901341003.
- Van Hoorickx, Reinhard (1971). "Franz Schubert (1797–1828) List of the Dances in Chronological Order". Revue belge de Musicologie / Belgisch Tijdschrift voor Muziekwetenschap. 25 (1). Belgian Musicological Society: 68–97. doi:10.2307/3686180. ISSN 0771-6788. JSTOR 3686180.
- Van Hoorickx, Reinhard (1974–1976). "Thematic Catalogue of Schubert's Works: New Additions, Corrections and Notes". Revue belge de Musicologie / Belgisch Tijdschrift voor Muziekwetenschap. 28–30. Belgian Musicological Society: 136–171. doi:10.2307/3686053. ISSN 0771-6788. JSTOR 3686053.
