= Symphony, D 708A (Schubert) =

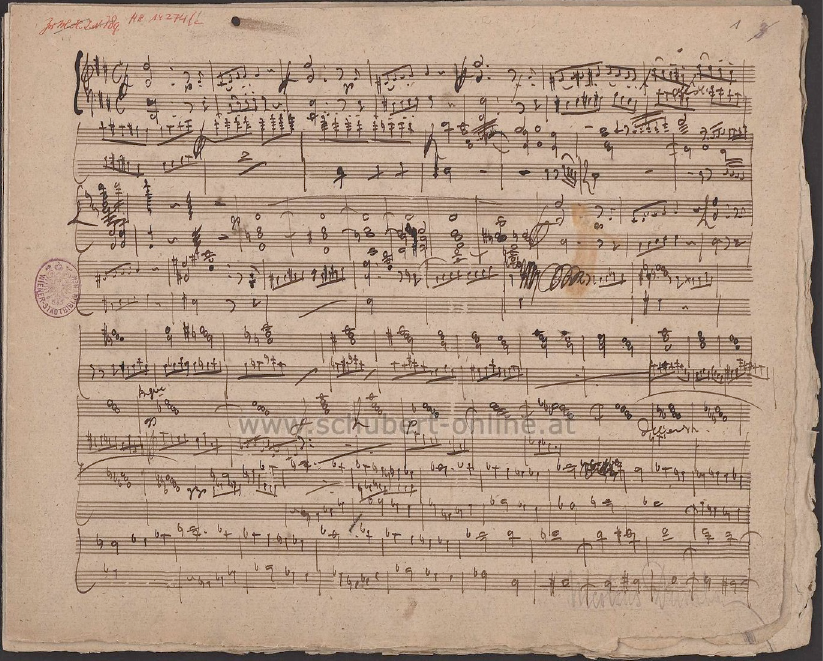
First page of Schubert's sketches for his projected Symphony in D, D 708A

Schubert's Symphony in D major, D 708A (occasionally numbered as Symphony No. 7, although this number more commonly represents another symphony, D 729), is an unfinished work that survives in an incomplete eleven-page sketch written for piano solo. It is one of Schubert's six unfinished symphonies. It was begun in 1820 or 1821, with initial sketches made for the opening sections of the first, second, and fourth movements, and an almost complete sketch for the third movement. He abandoned this symphony after this initial phase of work and never returned to it, although Schubert would live for another seven years. British conductor and composer Brian Newbould, an authority on Schubert's music, has speculated that the symphony was left incomplete due to problems Schubert faced in orchestrating the sketch.

In 2012, Newbould was commissioned by BBC Radio 3 to complete the symphony. He had previously completed three other unfinished symphonies by Schubert (the seventh (D 729), eighth (D 759), and tenth (D 936A). At that time he had done work to make the existing fragments of D 708A performable, but this was his first attempt to go beyond the fragments and complete the entire structure. His completed version has been subsequently performed, recorded, published, and broadcast on BBC Radio 3.

== History ==
=== Composition ===
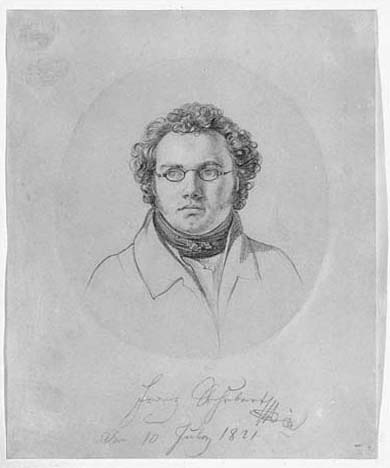
Schubert in 1821

This sketch is the second of a series of four unfinished symphonies – D 615, D 708A, D 729 (the seventh), and D 759 (the eighth) – that are milestones in Schubert's symphonic development between the sixth and ninth symphonies. These four symphonies are in varying states of completion: D 615 has incomplete sketches of only two movements (the allegro and the finale), D 708A has incomplete sketches of all four movements, D 729 is structurally complete but was not fully orchestrated, and D 759 has the first two movements complete and orchestrated and a third movement in an incomplete piano sketch. Previously, his fourth symphony had had some Beethovenian influence (although it is more reminiscent of the earlier Sturm und Drang movement), his fifth Mozartian influence, and his sixth Rossinian influence (Schubert had listened to Rossini's music before writing his sixth symphony and was extremely impressed, then incorporating aspects of Rossini's style into his music).

After writing the sixth symphony, Schubert experienced a directional crisis in his symphonic output, as he was not sure about whether to continue on the path, as in the sixth symphony, of being influenced by Rossini. There is thus some Beethovenian influence present, which would persist throughout his symphonic output, but in D 708A Schubert starts to create his own style and explore new territory. Additionally, he was still learning how to master instrumental writing, despite having done so for vocal works some years before. His mastery of songwriting was helped by the fact that the words gave hints as to the structure he would use, help that could not come in instrumental writing. This can be seen from the fact that Schubert had written his first six symphonies directly into full orchestral score, without sketching for piano beforehand, but D 615 and D 708A only survive as sketches in piano score. He returned to writing directly into orchestral score for his seventh symphony, although piano sketches exist for the eighth. These four unfinished symphonies thus show how Schubert was, as he stated in a letter from the mid-1820s, preoccupied with "planning a path to [write] a grand symphony [plans he would realize in the ninth symphony]", with his string quartets, octet and these unfinished symphonies as intermediate steps in this plan. The unusually large number of unfinished symphonies on the way to the ninth from the sixth show how preoccupied he was with writing this great symphony, and how important this plan was to him.

Schubert's reasons for abandoning D 708A probably have much to do with problems in orchestrating it. In addition to the problematic extremely high clarinet solos at points in the second and third movements, a further problem is that the climax of the fourth movement reaches A♭ major. This key is so far away from D major that the horns, trumpets and timpani simply have no notes to play at this climax (they were then confined to notes from a single key, usually the one the piece was written in), despite them being needed to provide a full, loud orchestral sound. Schubert therefore considered using trombones for this purpose, as they were not so restricted and could reinforce the bass register of the orchestra; but due to his then being unfamiliar with how to write for the trombone, and the fact that the symphony was not conceived with the use of trombones in mind, he abandoned work on D 708A and started writing the seventh symphony, in which he decided to use a trio of trombones from the very beginning. He later had to abandon work on that symphony as well to work on his opera Alfonso und Estrella. Schubert's use of trombones can later be seen in the eighth, ninth, and tenth symphonies.

=== Discovery ===
In the mid-20th century, Dr Ernst Hilmar discovered in a library in Vienna (the Wienbibliothek im Rathaus) a folio containing works by Schubert, titled "Sinfonie" and dated to May 1818. It contained sketches for nine movements, all in D major or related keys. In 1951, Otto Erich Deutsch assumed in the first edition of his catalogue of Schubert's works that all the material was for one symphony, which he labelled D 615. However, stylistic evidence shows that the material could not all have been for one symphony, aside from the fact that there was simply too much material to serve for one symphony. In fact the folio was labelled "Zwei Symphonien in D" ("Two Symphonies in D"), indicating that a librarian had previously thought along similar lines around 1900. A 1978 analysis of watermarks and handwriting proved that there was really three symphonies present: these were D 615 (2 movements, written 1818), D 708A (4 movements, written 1821), and D 936A (3 movements, written 1828; commonly referred to as Schubert's tenth symphony). These separate Deutsch numbers were given in the 1978 second edition of the Deutsch catalogue.

=== Completion ===
As the sketches for D 708A were more fragmentary than those for D 936A, Brian Newbould did not attempt to complete D 708A when he worked on completing Schubert's seventh, eighth and tenth symphonies in the 1980s, although he did orchestrate the existing fragments. It was only with the commission from BBC Radio 3 in 2012 that he embarked on the project to complete D 708A.

== Movements ==
- Schubert/Newbould Symphony D 708A in D major
1. [Allegro vivace],
2. [Andante con moto], 3/8
3. [Scherzo: Allegro vivace], 3/4
4. [Presto], 2/4

== Extant material of every movement ==
The sketches are written on two staves, with voice leading, and harmonies ranging from complete to partly indicated. The manuscript contains five instrumental indications, confirming that the intended orchestra was most probably similar in size to the sixth symphony, without trombones (that would become part of the Schubertian orchestra only in the seventh and later symphonies). Conforming to this symphony still being firmly in the Classical style, this orchestra was the same as that employed in the symphonies of the Viennese masters Haydn, Mozart, and the first two symphonies of Ludwig van Beethoven. The sketches total about 18 minutes of music; Newbould's completion lasts 35 minutes.

=== First movement ===
First theme

Second theme

The spirited first movement was almost certainly intended to be in sonata form, but the sketch breaks off at the end of the exposition. It is the only first movement of a Schubert symphony (barring the unfinished tenth symphony) that begins immediately with the first theme, without either a full slow introduction (as in the ninth) or a prefatory theme (as in the eighth). It begins with a rhythmic first theme in D major, which forms the basis for the accompaniment to the second theme; however, it abruptly and surprisingly grinds to a halt on an augmented sixth chord on the subdominant. After a modulatory passage in the transition, the second theme is first exposed in A♭ major, a tritone away from the original tonic, before modulating to the conventional dominant (A major). This is unprecedented in any works by the most important Viennese composers.

=== Second movement ===
Opening

The lyrical slow second movement is written in the dominant key of A major, but there is a great deal of modal mixture. After the first theme is first exposed in A major, a transition in the parallel minor leads to a restatement of the theme in F major, in which another theme is heard in two-part invertible counterpoint. The sketch ends here.

The initial statement of the first theme has a different rhythm than all its other statements. Newbould decided to regularize it in his completion, which he stated was the only time in his completion that he altered what Schubert wrote.

One of Schubert's instrumental cues in the sketch appears here, giving a melody to the clarinet. This is however very inconvenient due to the high tessitura of this melody, going up to written G_{6} (sounding E_{6}).

=== Third movement ===
Beginning of scherzo

Beginning of trio

The fast and light third movement is the most complete of all the movements in this sketch. It is a scherzo and trio written in the tonic key. The motive in eighth notes in its first bar was later reused in the scherzo of Schubert's ninth symphony. The opening is a lively fugato based on this motive, before the main melodies enter. The initial motive forms the basis for the accompaniment. The second section of the scherzo focuses around the mediant key of F♯ minor before returning to the opening material. The trio is set in the subdominant key of G major; though incomplete, only a few bars have to be reconstructed for the movement to be performable. Again, the trio sends the clarinet into the extreme high register (up to sounding D_{6}).

=== Fourth movement ===
Opening

The fourth movement is the finale, in sonata rondo form. Schubert started a first version, which he then crossed out to begin the movement anew. It opens with a melody in triplets on the flute; due to the triplets throughout, the movement gives the appearance of being in 6/8. Despite Schubert's attempting to reduce the influence of Rossini in his style here, the crescendo after the first statement of the theme is strongly reminiscent of Rossini's style. The movement breaks off at what appears to be the start of the recapitulation, on the dominant, as in the similar tarantella-finale of his third symphony, D 200.

Unusually, the music reaches the key of A♭ major during a climactic passage, using the chords of A♭ major and C♯ major. This means that the horns, trumpets and timpani have to remain silent despite their being conventionally present during climactic passages. This creates problems in orchestrating the symphony in Schubert's style, and is probably why the symphony was left unfinished. Due to the impossibility of using those instruments when necessary, Schubert considered using trombones for the finale, which could be used there. But because he had not originally intended the symphony to include trombones and was still unfamiliar with how to use them, he set this work aside to begin a new symphony that would be written for an orchestra with a trio of trombones added. This was the seventh symphony, D 729, which also remained incomplete.

== Newbould's completion ==
Due to the smaller amount of available material in this sketch than in the seventh, eighth, and tenth symphonies (which Newbould had previously completed), Newbould's completion is highly conjectural, especially in the development sections which were entirely absent from the sketch. Almost half of the final work was reconstructed by Newbould. It has been subsequently performed, recorded, published, and broadcast on BBC Radio 3. Its world premiere was given by the BBC Philharmonic, conducted by Juanjo Mena, on 29 March 2012. Newbould states that he thought about the sketch deeply in his completion attempt, eventually memorizing it and pretending to himself to have composed it in order to be able to find natural ways to develop the material.

The entire development section of the first movement is absent from the sketch and had to be composed by Newbould. This was challenging due to the exhaustive treatment of the thematic material by Schubert in the exposition alone. The recapitulations largely follow the exposition, with the necessary transpositions made.

Newbould adds to the second movement a modulatory passage leading into various keys before reentering the tonic key, only to move into C major for another statement of the first theme. After this statement, the second theme is restated in the tonic key, followed by another transition. A coda, based on the first theme, finishes the work in the tonic key. Despite the inconvenience of the allocation of the high melody to the clarinet in this movement and the scherzo, Newbould eventually decided to respect Schubert's marking in his completion, although this was not an easy decision.

In the third movement, being largely complete in Schubert's sketch, only a few bars needed to be added to complete the structure. The fourth movement was completed according to sonata-rondo form. Newbould's completion does not use trombones.
