= Rendering (Berio) =

Musical work composed by Luciano Berio

- by Luciano Berio
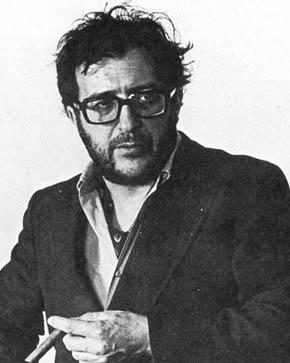
- Composed: 1989/90
- Performed: April 1990
- Movements: 3

Rendering is a 1989/1990 composition by the Italian composer Luciano Berio. Cast in three movements for full orchestra, it takes as its structure the fragmentary score of Schubert's uncompleted D major symphony, D 936A.

The work lasts for around 33 minutes. Its first two movements were completed in 1989 and first performed in June of that year, with Nikolaus Harnoncourt conducting the Concertgebouw Orchestra in Amsterdam. The third movement followed early the next year, and all three movements were played together for the first time in April 1990 under Riccardo Chailly, also in Amsterdam.

Berio claims to conduct a restoration of the sketches, entering where there are gaps or partial work. However, Brian Newbould, who made his own conjectural orchestration of the Schubert, has pointed out that Berio sometimes interrupts Schubert, even mid-phrase, where there is no gap in the sketch. As the title suggests, Berio fulfils a function close to that of a builder completing a house: his contributions fill the gaps like mortar fills the spaces in between the solid structure. Berio uses Schubertian motifs and quotes from the existing score, but in doing so emphasises the chasms in the score rather than attempting to smooth the interruptions away. As Giordano Montecchi states

Schubert's fragments give rise to musical moments of vertiginous beauty which nevertheless constantly founder in the emptiness of what was "not done" - and Berio fills this emptiness with... an iridescent musical screed woven around the timbre of the celesta... separating the fragments and at the same time holding them together, enabling them to reach the symphonic goal for which they were intended..."

Unlike pieces such as the various editions of Gustav Mahler's fragmentary Tenth Symphony, or Brian Newbould's conjectural orchestration of the Schubert, Rendering is intended as a completed work in its own right, rather than a 'performing version' of Schubert's Tenth.

It is scored for 2 flutes, 2 oboes, 2 clarinets in B♭, 2 bassoons, 2 horns in F, 2 trumpets, 3 trombones, timpani, celesta, and strings

Rendering has proved one of Berio's most enduring pieces and has been recorded several times, twice by Chailly alone. When illness caused the Italian maestro to withdraw from performances in Munich in 2011, David Robertson took over and the result was a new reading and recording by the Bavarian Radio Symphony Orchestra.

== Movements ==
The work has three movements:

1. Allegro
2. Andante
3. Scherzo
