= Felix Weingartner =

Austrian musician (1863–1942)

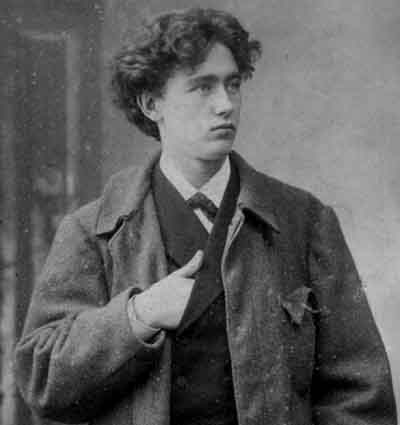
Weingartner c. 1890

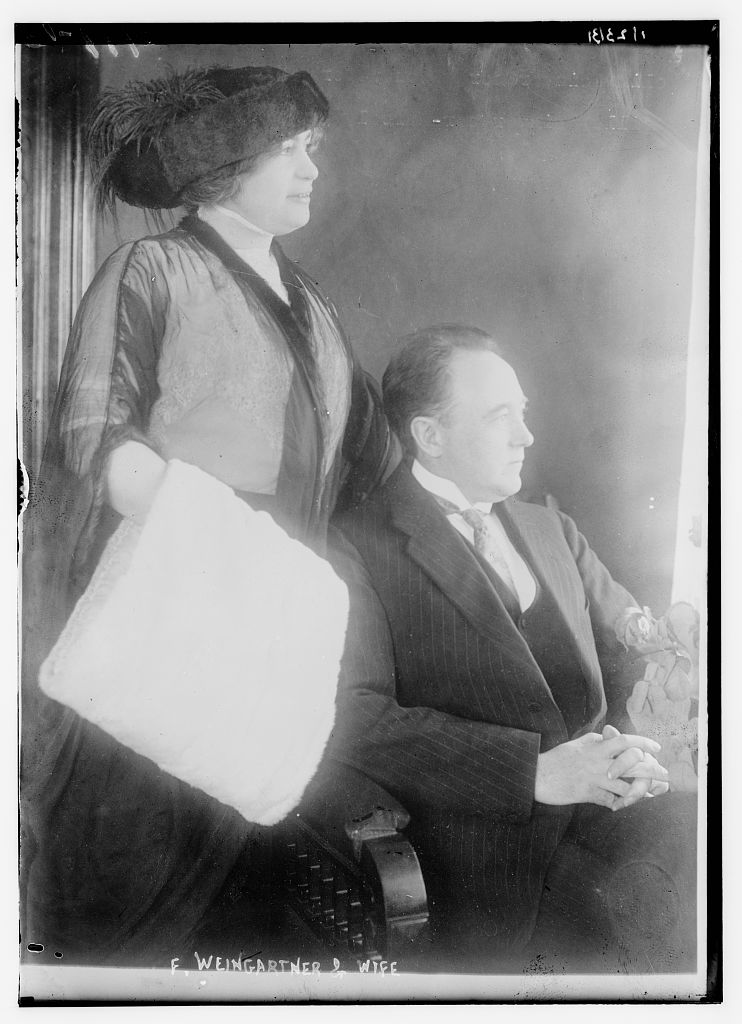
Weingartner and wife c. 1915

Paul Felix Weingartner, Edler von Münzberg (2 June 1863 – 7 May 1942) was an Austrian conductor, composer and pianist.

== Life and career ==
Weingartner was born in Zara, Dalmatia, Austrian Empire (now Zadar, Croatia), to Austrian parents. The family moved to Graz in 1868, and his father died later that year. He studied with Wilhelm Mayer (who published his own compositions under the pseudonym of W. A. Rémy and also taught Ferruccio Busoni). In 1881 he went to Leipzig to study philosophy, but soon devoted himself entirely to music, entering the Conservatory in 1883 and studying in Weimar as one of Franz Liszt's last pupils. Liszt helped produce the world premiere of Weingartner's opera Sakuntala in 1884 with the Weimar orchestra. According to Liszt biographer Alan Walker, however, the Weimar orchestra of the 1880s was far from its peak of a few decades earlier and the performance ended up poorly, with the orchestra going one way and the chorus another. Walker got this account from Weingartner's autobiography, published in Zürich and Leipzig in 1928–1929. The same year, 1884, he assumed the directorship of the Königsberg Opera. From 1885 to 1887 he was Kapellmeister in Danzig, then in Hamburg until 1889, and in Mannheim until 1891. Starting that year, he was Kapellmeister of the Royal Opera and conductor of symphony concerts in Berlin. He eventually resigned from the opera post while continuing to conduct the symphony concerts, and then settled in Munich, where he incurred the enmity of pundits like Rudolf Louis and Ludwig Thuille.

In 1902, at the Mainz Festival, Weingartner conducted all nine Beethoven symphonies. From 1907 to 1910 he was the Director of the Vienna Hofoper, succeeding Gustav Mahler; he retained the conductorship of the Vienna Philharmonic until 1927. From 1912 he was again Kapellmeister in Hamburg, but resigned in 1914 and went to Darmstadt as general music director while also often conducting in the U.S. for the Boston Opera Company between 1912 and 1914. In 1919–20, he was chief conductor of the Vienna Volksoper. In 1920, he became a professor at the Franz Liszt Academy in Budapest. From 1927 to 1934 he was music director of the Basel symphony orchestra. He made many outstanding Beethoven and Brahms symphony recordings in Vienna and London between the mid-1920s and his last recording session with the London Symphony, including Brahms Second Symphony to complete the historic Beethoven-Brahms symphony cycle he began in the 1920s (see below), on February 29, 1940. He gave his last concert in London that year and died in Winterthur, Switzerland two years later.

Weingartner was the first conductor to make commercial recordings of all nine Beethoven symphonies, and the second (to Leopold Stokowski in Philadelphia) to record all four Brahms symphonies. In 1935 he conducted the world premiere of Georges Bizet's long-lost Symphony in C. His crisp classical conducting style contrasted with the romantic approach of many of his contemporaries such as Wilhelm Furtwängler, whose conducting is now considered "subjective" on the basis of tempo fluctuations not called for in the printed scores; while Weingartner was more like Arturo Toscanini in insisting on playing as written. His 1935 recording of Beethoven's Symphony No. 9, for instance, sounds much more like Toscanini's 1936, 1938, 1939 and 1952 renditions (only the last of which was recorded in a studio rather than at a concert) than Furtwängler's far more expansive readings.

He taught conducting to students as eminent as Paul Sacher, Charles Houdret, Georg Tintner and Josef Krips. He experimented with films of himself conducting (such as in his only recorded performance of Weber's overture to Der Freischütz) as a tool in "orchestral training".

He was married five times, to Marie Juillerat (in 1891), Baroness Feodora von Dreifus (1903), mezzo-soprano Lucille Marcel (1912; died in 1921), actress Roxo Betty Kalisch (1922), and Carmen Studer (1931).

== Composer and editor ==
Despite his lifelong career as a conductor, Weingartner regarded himself as equally, if not more importantly, a composer. Besides numerous operas, Weingartner wrote seven symphonies which have all been recorded, with his other orchestral music, by cpo - classic production osnabrück, in Osnabrück, Germany. A sinfonietta, violin concerto, cello concerto, orchestral works, at least five string quartets, quintets for strings and for piano with clarinet and other pieces including a great many Lieder for voice and piano, one of which, "Liebesfeier" (text: Lenau) achieved a status as his most famous short work, in effect a "hit". Weingartner's choice of verse for his songs mirrors that of his contemporary composers: Max Reger, Joseph Marx, Richard Trunk and Richard Strauss.

His musical style, notably very generous, indeed rather valuable in its rather Schubertian melodic interest, is of its time: an amalgam of late Romanticism and early Modernism, comparable with those of his contemporaries Richard Strauss, Gustav Mahler, Franz Schreker and Alexander Zemlinsky. His idiom left some marks on Erich Wolfgang Korngold, whose precocious Sinfonietta is dedicated to Weingartner, who conducted its first performance. His Third Symphony was intended both as a message of love to Lucille Marcel and a reply to the many critical attacks on him in Vienna; the finale reaches a climax in a parody of the waltz from Johann Strauss II's Die Fledermaus. Similarly, he managed to finish his Fifth Symphony in time for Roxo Betty's birthday, a trend in romantic attachment which may attract at least passing notice, for he was thus a very dedicated bridegroom in his deployment of manuscript paper.

Weingartner edited, with Charles Malherbe, the complete works of Hector Berlioz (he once called Berlioz the "creator of the modern orchestra") as well as the operas Joseph by Méhul and Oberon by Weber, and individual works of Gluck, Wagner and others. He also made orchestral versions of piano works such as Beethoven's Hammerklavier Sonata, Weber's Invitation to the Dance, and Bizet's Variations chromatiques. Before Brian Newbould's more recent work, in 1934, he made a performing version of Schubert's Symphony No. 7 in E major, D. 729, that has received some performances and recordings; he also arranged works by a number of early Romantic masters for orchestral performance.

== Writings and interests ==
Weingartner was early interested in the occult, astrology, and Eastern mysticism, which influenced his personal philosophy and his music to some extent. He was himself a prolific writer who published a poetical drama, Golgotha, in 1908. He wrote copiously on music drama, on conducting, on the symphony since Beethoven, on the symphonies of Beethoven, Schubert and Schumann as well as on art and esoteric subjects. Two collections of essays were Musikalische Walpurgisnacht (1907) and Akkorde (1912). He also published an autobiography, Lebenserinnerungen in 1923.

== See also ==
- List of Austrians in music

== Bibliography ==
- Dyment, Christopher; Dyment, Christopher (1976). Felix Weingartner: Recollections & Recordings. Rickmansworth, England: Triad press. ISBN 0-902070-17-7.
- Holden, Raymond (2005). The Virtuoso Conductors: The Central European Tradition from Wagner to Karajan. New Haven, Connecticut: Yale University Press. ISBN 0-300-09326-8.
- Weingartner, Felix (2004). On the Performance of Beethoven's Symphonies and Other Essays. Mineola, New York: Dover Publications. ISBN 0-486-43966-6.
- Weingartner, Felix; Arthur Bles (1971) [1907]. The Symphony Writers Since Beethoven. London: William Reeves. ISBN 0-8371-4369-1.
- Weingartner, Felix; Wolff, Marguerite (1937). Buffets and Rewards: A Musician's Reminiscences. London: Hutchinson & Co. OCLC 3288646.

Cultural offices
Preceded by ?	Hofkapellmeisters, Berlin Opera; 1891-1898	Succeeded by ?
