= Richard Trunk =

Richard Trunk (born Tauberbischofsheim, 10 February 1879 - died Herrsching, 2 June 1968) was a German composer, pianist, conductor, critic, and member of the Nazi Party.

== Life ==
He studied in Frankfurt with Iwan Knorr before traveling to Munich for further studies with Josef Rheinberger. He accompanied numerous singers (including Eugen Gura), taught singing for a time, and served as music critic for the Münchener Post from 1907. He was invited to New York City and Newark, New Jersey to conduct the Arion Society in 1912; he returned home with the outbreak of World War I. He later became music critic for the Bayrische Staatszeitung, and taught singing in Cologne from 1920 until 1934. In 1925 he married the singer Maria Delbran. In 1934, through the involvement of Ernst Röhm, he returned to Munich as the president of the Akademie der Tonkunst. He retired to the Ammersee after World War II.

Trunk was a member of the Nazi Party, having joined in Autumn 1931. In 1939, he was awarded the Goethe-Medaille für Kunst und Wissenschaft by Adolf Hitler. His songs Op. 65 set to music texts by Baldur von Schirach and Hanns Johst.

In 1948, a denazification court classified Trunk as a Mitläufer and issued him a Persilschein.

== Works ==
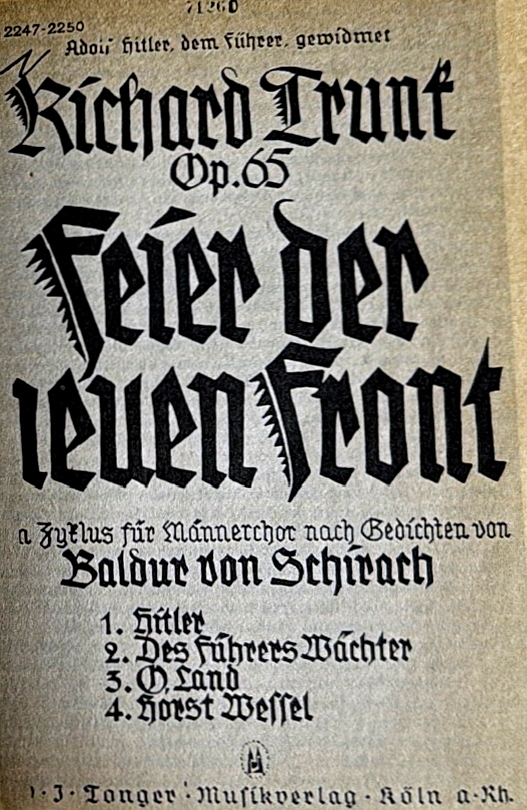
Title page of the score to Trunk's "Feier der Neuen Front" op. 65, released in 1935 and dedicated to Adolf Hitler

Most of Trunk's musical works were choral pieces or songs with piano accompaniment, though he also composed an operetta (Herzdame, 1916) and some instrumental works and chamber music.

== Legacy ==
In Tauberbischofsheim, a street and music school are named in Trunk's honor, and a plaque marks the house in which he was born. As of 2025, discussions are planned to re-evaluate the town's commemoration of Trunk.
