= Symphony No. 9 (Schubert) =

Symphony by Franz Schubert

Symphony in C major
- Great
- by Franz Schubert
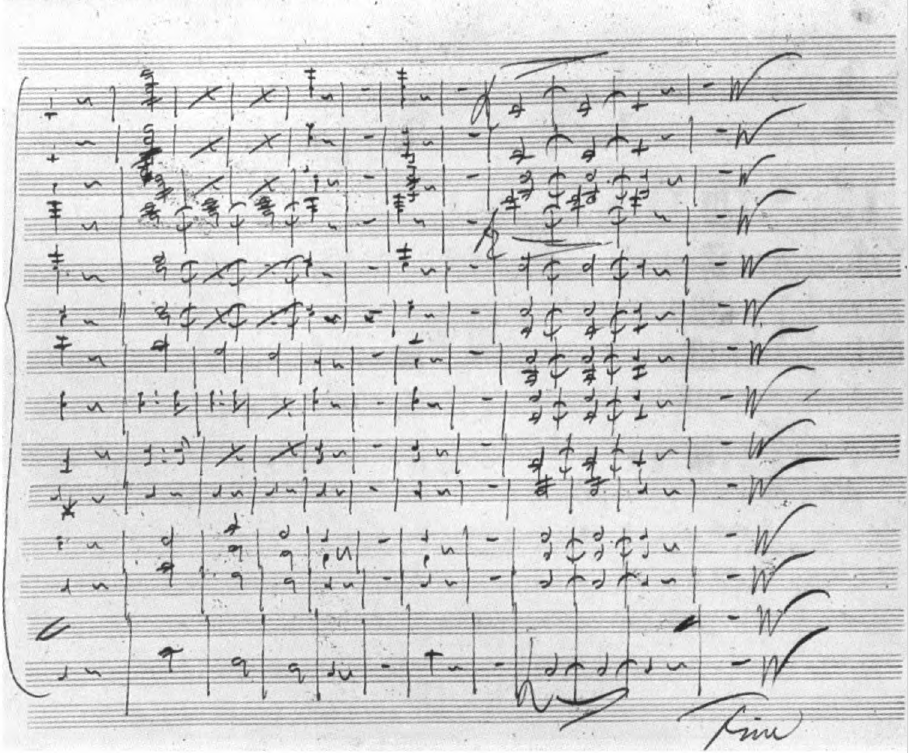
- Last page of the symphony (autograph manuscript)
- Catalogue: D. 944
- Composed: 1824–26
- Published: 1849
- Publisher: Breitkopf & Härtel
- Duration: 1 hour
- Movements: 4
- Scoring: Orchestra

Premiere
- Date: 21 March 1839
- Location: Gewandhaus
- Conductor: Felix Mendelssohn
- Performers: Leipzig Gewandhaus Orchestra

The Symphony in C major, D. 944, known as the Great, is the final symphony completed by Franz Schubert. It was first published by Breitkopf & Härtel in 1849 as "Symphonie / C Dur / für großes Orchester" and listed as Symphony No. 8 in the New Schubert Edition, but in the traditional English system it is numbered 9. Originally called The Great C major to distinguish it from his Symphony No. 6, the Little C major, the subtitle is now usually taken as a reference to the symphony's majesty. Unusually long for a symphony of its time, a typical performance of the Great lasts around one hour when all repeats indicated in the score are taken. The symphony was not professionally performed until 1839, over a decade after Schubert's death.

== Composition and early reception ==
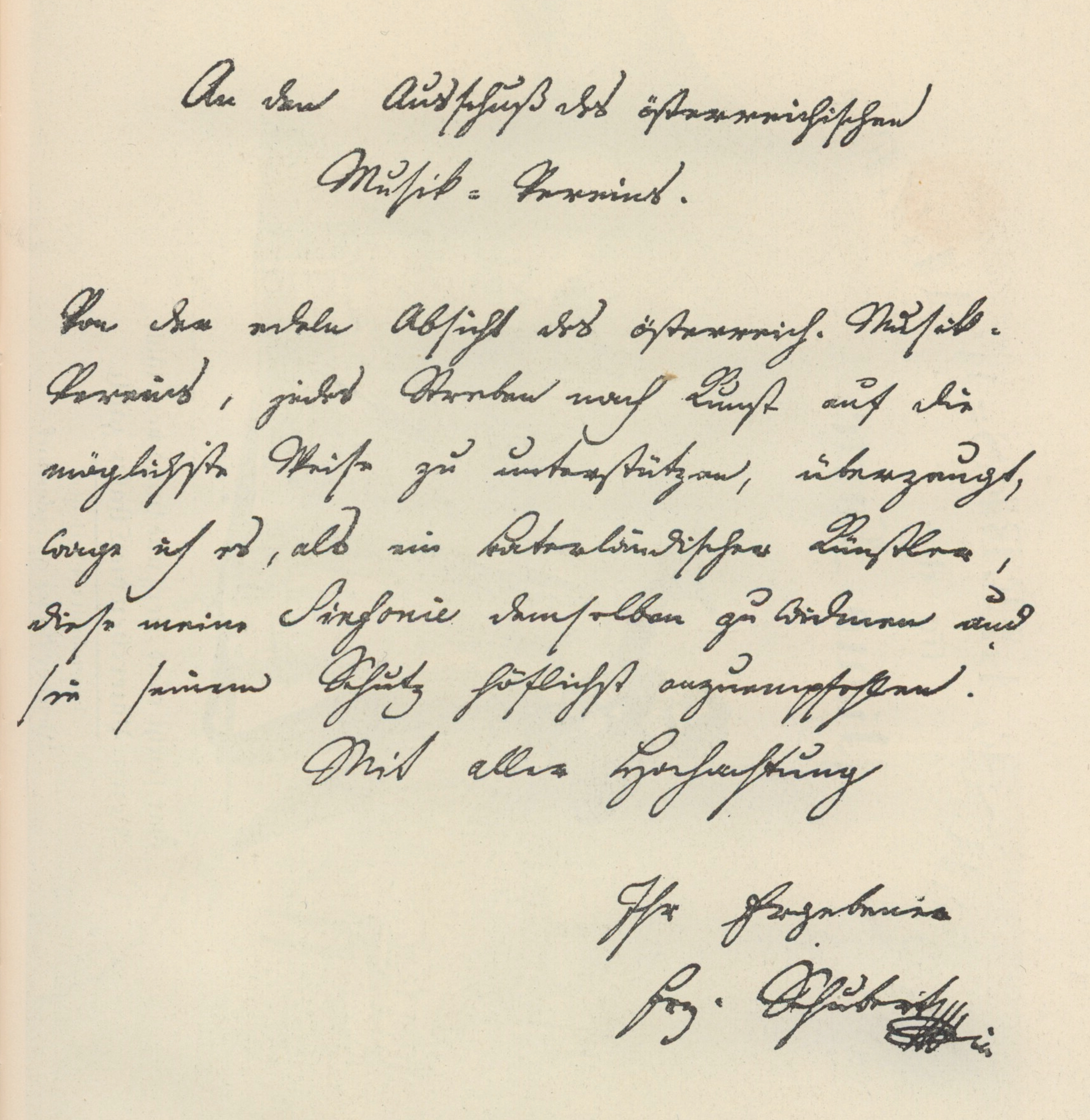
Schubert's letter concerning the Symphony No. 9, D. 944

For a long time, the symphony was believed to be a work of Schubert's last year, 1828. It was true that, in the last months of his life, he did start drafting a symphony – but this was the work in D major now accepted as Symphony No. 10, which has been realized for performance by Brian Newbould. It is now known that sketches for the 'Great' were largely composed in the summer of 1825 and that it was indeed the work to which Schubert was referring in a letter of March, 1824 when he said he was preparing himself to write 'a grand symphony' (originally listed as the Gmunden-Gastein symphony, D 849, in the Deutsch Catalogue). By the spring or summer of 1826, it was completely scored and in October, Schubert, who was unable to pay for a performance, sent it to the Gesellschaft der Musikfreunde with a dedication. In response, they gave him a small payment, arranged for the copying of the orchestral parts, and at some point in the latter half of 1827, gave the work an unofficial perfunctory run-through (the exact date and the conductor are unknown) – though it was set aside as too long and difficult for the amateur orchestra of the conservatory.

A recent hypothesis suggests that the symphony may have received its first performance on 12 March 1829 in a Concert Spirituel at the Landständischer Saal of the Palais Niederösterreich in Vienna. The evidence for this hypothesis is slender, however, and it contradicts contemporary sources which prove that Schubert's Symphony No. 6 (also in C major) was performed at this instance. In 1836, Schubert's brother Ferdinand attempted to have the final movement performed, yet there is no evidence that a public performance ever took place.

In 1838, ten years after Schubert's death, Robert Schumann visited Vienna and was shown the manuscript of the symphony at the Gesellschaft der Musikfreunde by Ferdinand Schubert. He took a copy that Ferdinand had given him back to Leipzig, where the entire work was performed publicly for the first time by Felix Mendelssohn at the Leipzig Gewandhaus on 21 March 1839. Schumann celebrated the event in the Neue Zeitschrift für Musik with an ecstatic article in which, in a phrase destined to become famous, he hailed the symphony for its 'heavenly length'.

The symphony, however, was found to be very difficult for orchestras of the day because of its extremely lengthy woodwind and string parts. When Mendelssohn took the symphony to Paris in 1842 and London in 1844, orchestras flatly refused to play it; in London, the violinists are reputed to have collapsed in laughter when rehearsing the second subject of the finale.

== Numbering ==
There continues to be long-standing controversy regarding the numbering of this symphony, with some scholars (usually German) numbering it as Symphony No. 7. The most recent version of the Deutsch catalogue (the standard catalogue of Schubert's works, compiled by Otto Erich Deutsch) lists it as No. 8, while most non-German-speaking scholars number it as No. 9.

== Form ==
I. Andante only

II. Andante con moto (conclusion extract)

III. Trio and Scherzo da capo only

IV. Finale. Allegro vivace (extract)
Performed by the London Symphony Orchestra conducted by Bruno Walter (1938)

Following the standard symphonic form, there are four movements:

1. Andante – Allegro ma non troppo – Più moto (685 bars), in C major
2. Andante con moto (380 bars), in A minor
3. Scherzo. Allegro vivace (238 bars), in C major; Trio (166 bars), in A major
4. Finale. Allegro vivace (1154 bars), in C major

=== I. Andante – Allegro ma non troppo – Più moto ===
The first movement begins with an extensive introduction with its own miniaturised exposition, development and recapitulation. The opening theme is used in a modified form as secondary subject matter in the main section of the movement. The rest of the movement is in sonata form with two periods for each theme and several transition themes and extra material. For instance, the second theme begins in E minor rather than G major, while a prominent trombone solo occurs in A♭ major. The opening theme of the introduction is restated in the coda (b. 570) before the final cadences.

=== II. Andante con moto ===
The second movement is in a modified sonata form without a development section characterised as P1 S1 P2 S2 (or A–B–A–B). The march-like first theme is primarily based on the home key of A minor, with excursions to A major throughout. The second theme in F major is far more lyrical and consoling. Notably, the transition between the first and second themes in the recapitulation is extended and further developed, almost as if it is a development section in itself.

=== III. Scherzo. Allegro vivace; Trio ===
The third movement is a lengthy Scherzo and Trio which is structured in sonata form.

=== IV. Finale. Allegro vivace ===
The finale is in an extended sonata form. There are no less than six unique thematic elements in the main themes alone. The development section focuses on the third and sixth thematic elements. There is an extensive use of ostinato in accompaniment of two of the thematic elements. Midway through this final movement Schubert pays tribute to Beethoven by quoting from the finale of his Ninth Symphony. The recapitulation is unusual in that it begins in E♭ major, modulates to F major, and then to the tonic (rather than everything being in the tonic as expected).

== Instrumentation ==
The symphony is scored for 2 flutes, 2 oboes, 2 clarinets in A and C, 2 bassoons, 2 horns in C, 2 trumpets in A and C, 3 trombones, timpani, and strings.

Beethoven previously used trombones sparingly as an effect in his Fifth and Sixth Symphonies, and in the case of his Ninth Symphony, he used trombones to double the alto, tenor, and bass parts of the chorus as was common in sacred music and opera at the time. However, in his Unfinished Symphony and this one, Schubert fully integrates the trombones into the orchestra, using them liberally and at times melodically.

== See also ==
- Schubert's symphonies

== Notes ==
=== References ===
- Brian Newbould, Schubert and the Symphony. A New Perspective (London, 1992) ISBN 978-0-907689-26-3
