= Symphony No. 5 (Schubert) =

1816 symphony by Franz Schubert

- by Franz Schubert
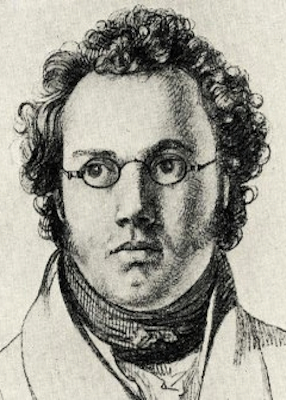
- 1821 Drawing of Franz Schubert by Joseph Kupelwieser
- Key: B♭ major
- Catalogue: D. 485
- Composed: 1816
- Duration: About 28 minutes
- Movements: 4
- Scoring: Orchestra

Franz Schubert's Symphony No. 5 in B♭ major, D. 485, was written mainly in September 1816 and completed on 3 October 1816. It was finished six months after the completion of his previous symphony.

Like all of Schubert's symphonies, it was not published until after the composer's death. Johannes Brahms edited the symphony for its publication in 1885 as part of the first collected edition of Franz Schubert's Works.

== Scoring ==
The symphony is scored for one flute, two oboes, two bassoons, two horns in B♭ and E♭, and strings – of all his symphonies, this has the smallest orchestration. It is Schubert's only symphony which does not include clarinets, trumpets or timpani.

== Mozartian influence ==
In character, the writing is often said to resemble Mozart; Schubert was infatuated with the composer at the time he composed it, writing in his diary on June 13 of the year of composition, "O Mozart! Immortal Mozart! What countless impressions of a brighter, better life hast thou stamped upon our souls!" This is reflected particularly in the lighter instrumentation, as noted above. Indeed, the instrumentation matches that of the first version (without clarinets) of Mozart's 40th symphony. For another example, there is a strong similarity between the opening themes of the second movement of the symphony and the last movement of Mozart's Violin Sonata in F major, K. 377.

== Musical analysis ==
There are four movements:

1. Allegro (B♭ major, alla breve 2/2) (299 bars)
2. Andante con moto (E♭ major, 6/8 time) (141 bars)
3. Menuetto. Allegro molto (G minor, 3/4 time (88 bars), with a Trio in G major (40 bars) )
4. Finale. Allegro vivace (B♭ major, 2/4 time) (394 bars)

=== I. Allegro ===
This is Schubert's first symphony to not start with a slow introduction. What starts the movement is a four-bar structural upbeat similar to the one that begins the finale of his Fourth Symphony before the main theme starts on bar 5. The main theme is a simple rising arpeggio with a dotted rhythm that dominates all of the themes of the exposition. The first movement is a slightly unusual sonata form since the recapitulation begins, as in the first movement of Mozart's sonata facile (and Schubert's Trout Quintet), in the subdominant, not in the main key of the piece as is more usual. Schubert had previously used this device in his Second Symphony.

=== II. Andante con moto ===
The slow movement opens with a theme in two repeated stanzas. Following that, there is a modulation to C♭ that is very characteristic of Schubert, even at age 19. The return to the main theme is straightforward, passing through G minor on the way. There is a repetition of the distant modulation afterwards, though to G♭ this time and with a more immediate return.

=== III. Menuetto & Trio. Allegro molto ===
The menuetto has the chromaticism, though not the polyphony, of the menuetto of Wolfgang Amadeus Mozart's Symphony No. 40. The progression used mid-way through the movement to modulate is borrowed almost directly from Mozart – using the same approach (a gradual layering of instruments) to a dominant seventh chord. The trio is quiet throughout, and only gradually accumulates instruments, beginning with only bassoon and strings, and with a subtle suggestion of a pastoral mood over held lower string notes.

=== IV. Finale. Allegro vivace ===
The finale is in sonata form.
