= Symphony No. 7 (Schubert) =

Symphony by Franz Schubert

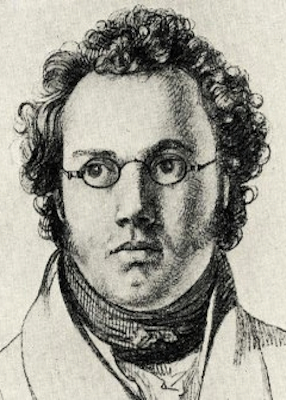
1821 drawing of Franz Schubert by Josef Kupelwieser

Symphony No. 7 is the name given to a four-movement symphony in E major (D 729) drafted by Franz Schubert in August 1821. Although the work (which comprises about 1350 bars) is structurally complete, Schubert only orchestrated the slow introduction and the first 110 bars of the first movement. The rest of the work is continued on 14-stave score pages as a melodic line with occasional basses or counterpoints, giving clues as to changes in orchestral texture. The symphony is one of four unfinished symphonies Schubert worked on between 1818 and 1822, the others being the symphonies in D major D 615 of 1818 and D 708A of 1820, and the symphony in B minor D 759 – the "Unfinished Symphony".

Schubert seems to have laid the symphony aside in order to work on his opera Alfonso und Estrella, and never returned to it. The manuscript was given by Schubert's brother Ferdinand to Felix Mendelssohn and was subsequently acquired by Sir George Grove, who bequeathed it to the Royal College of Music in London. There are at least four completions: by John Francis Barnett (1881), Felix Weingartner (1934), Brian Newbould (1980), and Richard Dünser (2022). The work is now generally accepted to be Schubert's Seventh Symphony, an appellation which some scholars had preferred to leave for the hypothesised 'Gastein Symphony' that was long believed to have been written and lost in 1824, which is now generally identified as the "Great C Major" symphony, No. 9.

The revised Deutsch catalogue and the Neue Schubert-Ausgabe do not number this symphony, preferring to give the number 7 to the Unfinished Symphony. In the complete edition of Breitkopf & Härtel (Franz Schubert's Works), the number 7 is given to the Great C major symphony.

== Instrumentation ==
This symphony is scored for an even larger orchestral force than Schubert's eighth and ninth symphonies. The score calls for double woodwinds, four horns, two trumpets, three trombones, timpani and strings.

== Movements ==
Weingartner completion

1. Adagio ma non troppo – Allegro (E minor — E major)
2. Andante (A major)
3. Scherzo: Allegro deciso (C major — Trio in A major)
4. Allegro vivace (E major)

Newbould completion

1. Adagio – Allegro
2. Andante
3. Scherzo: Allegro
4. Allegro giusto

(The true marking is ffz rather than fz, but that is not available in LilyPond as implemented on Wikipedia.)
