= Symphony No. 6 (Schubert) =

Composition by Franz Schubert

- Little
- by Franz Schubert
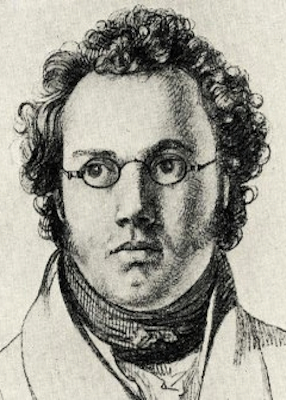
- 1821 Drawing of Franz Schubert by Joseph Kupelwieser
- Key: C major
- Catalogue: D. 589
- Composed: 1817-18
- Performed: Vienna, 1828
- Duration: About 35 minutes
- Movements: 4
- Scoring: Orchestra

The Symphony No. 6 in C major, D. 589, is a symphony by Franz Schubert composed between October 1817 and February 1818. Its first public performance was in Vienna in 1828. It is nicknamed the "Little C major" to distinguish it from his later, significantly longer symphony in the same key, which is known as the "Great C major".

== Music ==
The symphony is scored for two flutes, two oboes, two clarinets (in C), two bassoons, two horns (in C), two trumpets (in C), timpani (in C and G) and strings.

There are four movements:

1. Adagio, 3/4 — Allegro, 2/2 (392 bars)
2. Andante, 2/4 in F major (134 bars)
3. Scherzo: Presto (170 bars); Trio: Piu lento (Trio in E major) (80 bars), 3/4
4. Allegro moderato, 2/4 (564 bars)

A typical performance lasts around 35 minutes.
