= Symphony No. 10 (Schubert) =

Unfinished work identified in the 1970s

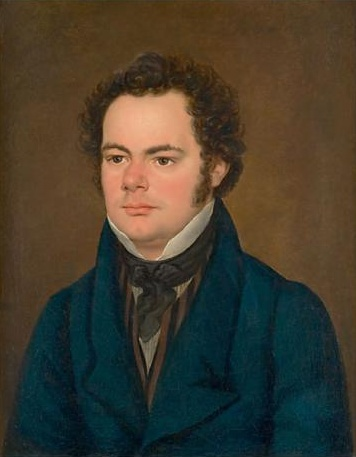
Franz Schubert in 1827 (attributed to Anton Depauly)

Schubert's Symphony No. 10 in D major, D 936A, is an unfinished work that survives in a piano sketch. Written during the last weeks of the composer's short life, it was only properly identified in the 1970s. It has been orchestrated by Brian Newbould in a completion that has subsequently been performed, published and recorded.

== Contemporary history ==
The sketch appears to date from the last weeks of the composer's life, in October–November 1828, and is presumed to be the Last Symphony (Letzte Symphonie) mentioned by his friend Eduard von Bauernfeld in an appreciation of Schubert published in the Wiener Zeitschrift für Kunst, Literatur, Theater und Mode for 13 June 1829.

The music of the symphony appears to some extent exploratory and contains unusual elements, notably the hybrid form of the third movement and the highly contrapuntal nature of much of the material. Sketches for the third movement are intermingled with several counterpoint exercises, which suggests that it is related in some way to the single counterpoint lesson Schubert took from Simon Sechter a few weeks before his death in 1828.

== Extant material of every movement ==
The sketches are written on two staves, with voice leading, and harmonies ranging from complete to partly indicated. The manuscript contains about 30 instrumental indications, confirming that the intended orchestra was similar in size to the eighth and ninth symphonies, with a trio of trombones.

The manuscript contains sketches of three movements, each one in different time signatures. Scholars agree that the second movement is virtually completed, while the two outer movements are in less completed form. According to composer, conductor and Schubert expert Brian Newbould, the second and third movements are complete in the sketches, with the first only lacking the recapitulation.

=== First movement ===
Allegro maestoso in D major, 4/4

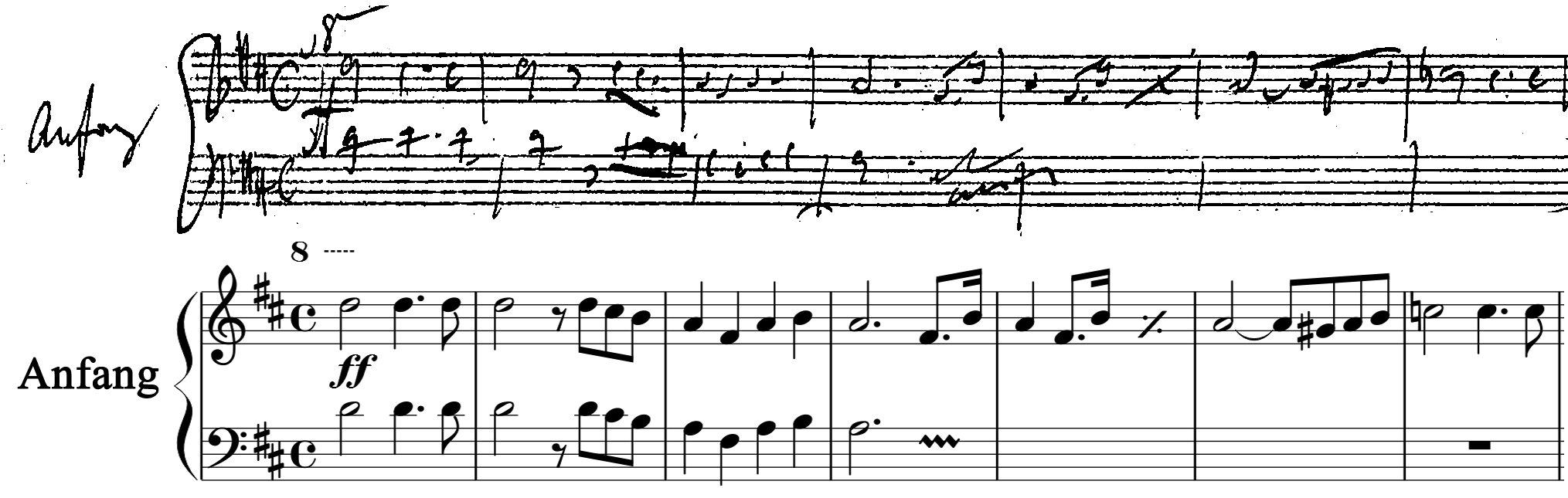
Beginning of the first movement in Schubert's manuscript. In the exposition of this sonata form movement, the composer crossed out the first subject group and the transition, and wrote a revised version in a separate page. To avoid confusions, it was labeled Anfang ("beginning").

For the first movement, in sonata form, Schubert wrote the full exposition; however, he then crossed out the first theme group and the transition and rewrote them on the following page; these lead to the second theme as written in the first draft. After ending the exposition in several A major cadences, the tempo changes from Allegro maestoso to Andante, and the new key of B♭ minor is established. This new section, acting as an unconventional development, presents a solemn chorale-like variation of the second subject played by the trombones. According to Newbould, the whole development is written out, but there is no recapitulation. Actually, many sketches of Schubert's finished works lack the recapitulation (like his last piano sonatas), due to it being mostly a partially transposed repetition of the exposition. After this, a series of short "modules" marked Presto serve as sketches for the coda of the movement.

=== Second movement ===
Andante in B minor, 3/8

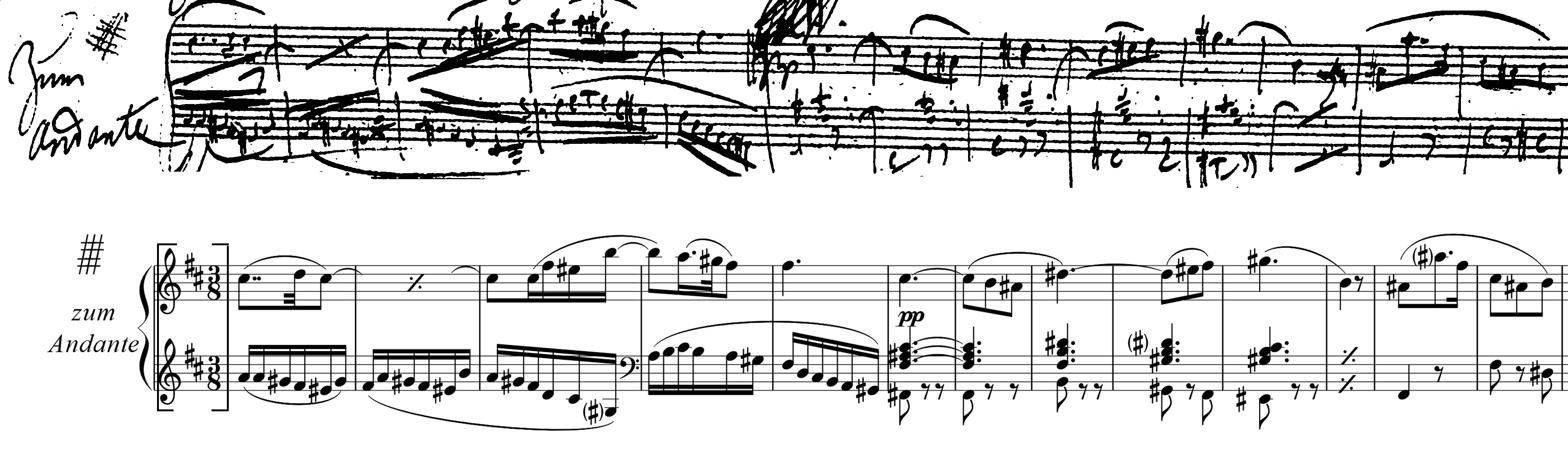
As an afterthought, Schubert added an F♯ major theme at the end of the exposition of the second movement, written on a separate page. To avoid confusions, the passage was labeled zum Andante ("for the andante"). The first five measures are already present in the original redaction of the movement. A #-like sign similar to the one on the left was written on the spot of the andante where the fragment was meant to be interspersed.

The second movement, whose lyricism is reminiscent of the composer's Winterreise, as well as foreshadowing Mahler's Kindertotenlieder, is also laid out in sonata form. In the sketch, Schubert crossed out the coda, despite no apparent falling-off in quality. Also, a haunting (in Newbould's words) F♯ major melody at the end of the second subject group of the exposition does not reappear later in the movement; it had been added as an afterthought in another page, apparently after discarding the coda. Newbould claims that the melody was "too beautiful" to be heard only once, and that Schubert's intention was to repeat it in the recapitulation (in the tonic major, B major) before the coda (as expected in sonata form), but that he left those details aside and he began the third movement instead.

=== Third movement ===
Scherzo (Allegro moderato in Newbould's edition) in D major, 2/4

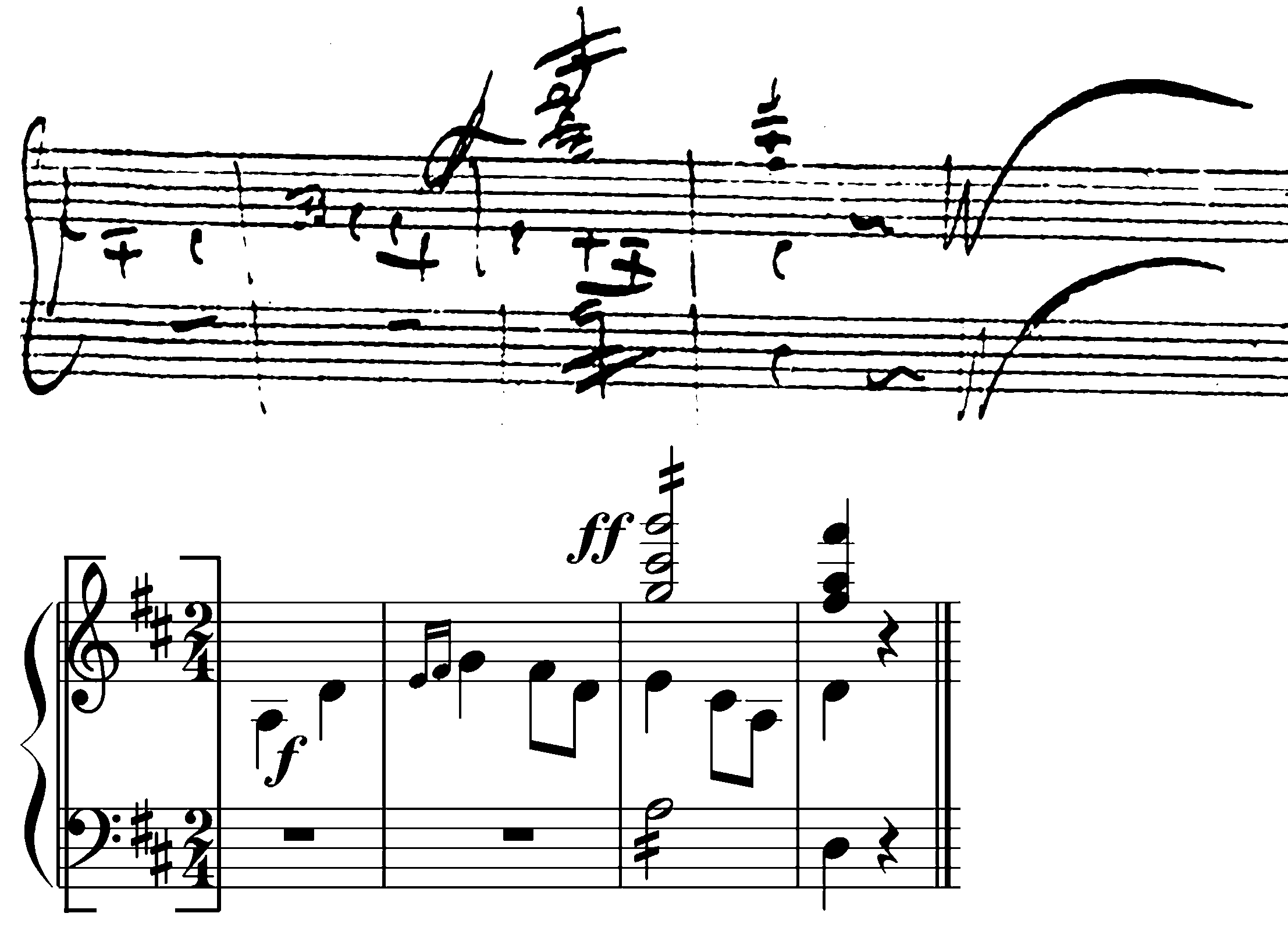
Last 4 measures of the third movement, featuring the motif that opened it (notice the end barline). While being made up of several unordered sections, in Newbould's opinion, the movement is complete.

The third movement was at first labelled "scherzo", despite being in 2/4. After writing a few measures, Schubert left it aside, instead filling the page with counterpoint exercises testing the compatibility of the elements, in order to give the original opening a logical continuation. On another page, the movement is started again, this time materializing into a complete movement that became the finale of the symphony (according to Newbould). The movement is unconventional, either as a scherzo or as a finale. What was intended as the trio of a scherzo in ternary form in the first draft, became an episode later, while the piece was reshaped into a rondo. The movement is riddled with counterpoint (canons, invertible counterpoint, fugato, augmentation), and the two main themes (the original "scherzo" and "trio" themes) are superimposed at the end of the symphony. According to Newbould, several middle-sized sections of the movement have to be reshuffled in order to understand the movement, and that two of them were discarded (despite not explicitly deleted in the manuscript) as their material or function was overtaken by other.

== Newbould's completion ==
According to Newbould, the exposition and development of the first movement are completely written out, so the recapitulation is based on the exposition, with the pertinent transpositions. Only 11 bars based on earlier transitional material or composed by Newbould were added. As for the coda, his reconstruction became more speculative, but Schubert left a series of modules marked presto which left the overall plan clear. In his opinion, the composer left enough clues so as to decide the correct order of the modules.

For the second movement, Newbould repeated the F♯ major melody (this time in the tonic, B) at the end of the recapitulation, in analogy to the exposition. He also used the coda that Schubert had discarded, since in his view, it had been crossed out in order to restate the melody before.

For the third movement, Newbould reshuffled some sections (as they were not in order in his view), and discarded two of them, which in his opinion had been discarded by Schubert (despite no explicit deletion in the manuscript) as their material or function was overtaken by other sections.

=== Bartholomée's additions ===
Belgian conductor Pierre Bartholomée viewed Newbould's completion as too respectful and conservative. Subsequently, he reharmonized parts of it to fit his idea of Schubert's late style, and gave more development to contrapuntal entries only indicated in the manuscript. He also gave the winds more prominent roles. He also adds the scherzo from the D 708A symphonic fragment as the third movement. In this aspect, Bartholomée's edition is debatable as the fragment seems to have been conceived by Schubert in a three-movement form, with the third movement combining elements of a Scherzo and a Rondo. Additionally, Bartholomée did not respect the instruments available at Schubert's time, when he wrote for chromatic horns and trumpets.

== Related works ==
- Luciano Berio's Rendering, composed in 1989, is based on the sketches for this symphony.
