= Otto Erich Deutsch =

Austrian musicologist (1883–1967)

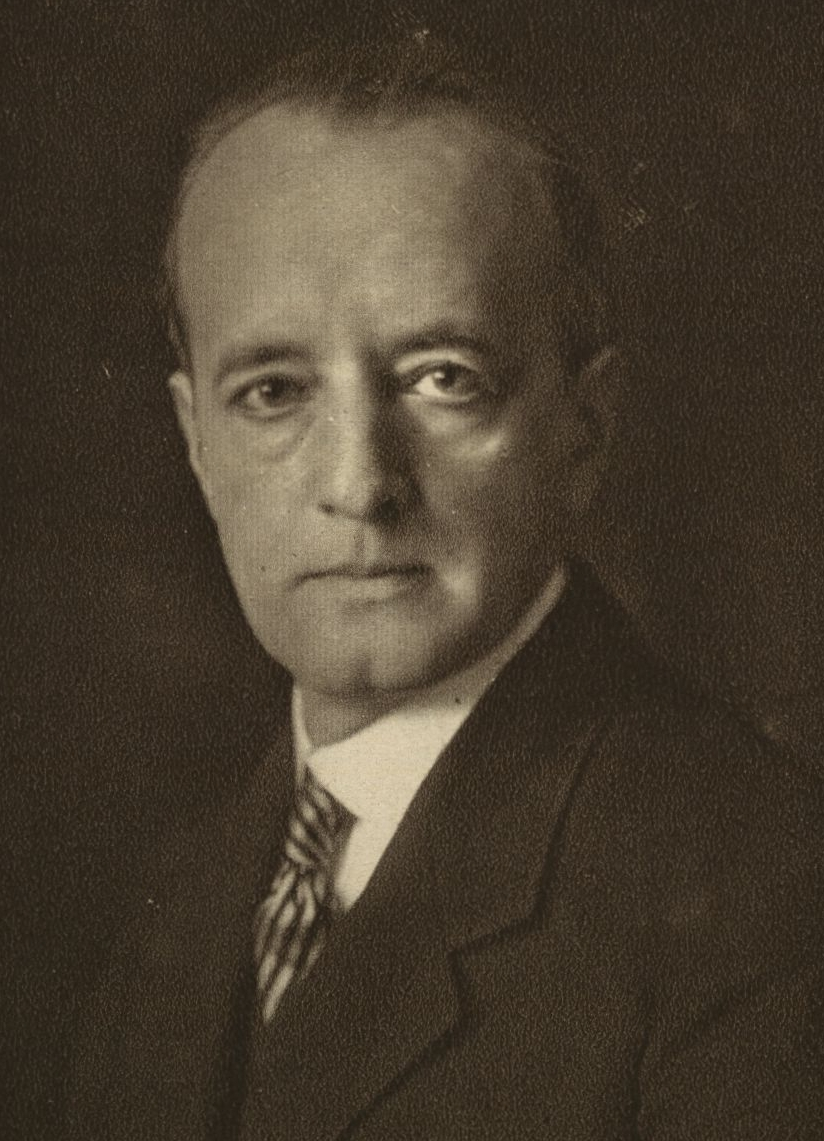
- Born: 5 September 1883; Vienna, Austria
- Died: 23 November 1967 (aged 84); Baden bei Wien, Austria
- Occupation: Musicologist
- Known for: Compiling the first comprehensive catalogue of Franz Schubert's compositions

Otto Erich Deutsch (5 September 1883 – 23 November 1967) was an Austrian musicologist. He is known for compiling the first comprehensive catalogue of Franz Schubert's compositions, first published in 1951 in English, with a revised edition published in 1978 in German. It is from this catalogue that the D numbers used to identify Schubert's works derive.

== Life ==
Deutsch was born in Vienna on 5 September 1883 to a Jewish family.

Following his studies of art history and literature in Vienna and Graz, he worked as an assistant at the Department of Art History of the University of Vienna. His specialization was the Biedermeier period, which led naturally to his interest in Schubert, whose life took place during this cultural era. His scholarly career was interrupted by World War I when he served in the Austrian Army. Following the war Deutsch worked for a time as a bookseller. He also shifted his scholarly interests to historical musicology, eventually becoming music librarian, working in the archives of Anthony van Hoboken. In 1938, when Austria was taken over by Nazi Germany in the Anschluss, Deutsch decided to flee the country, as he was a Protestant of Jewish origin. He lived in Cambridge, England, from 1939 to 1951, returning to Vienna after the war.

Deutsch was a close friend of music theorist Heinrich Schenker, and of the British musicologist and Schubert scholar Maurice J. E. Brown.

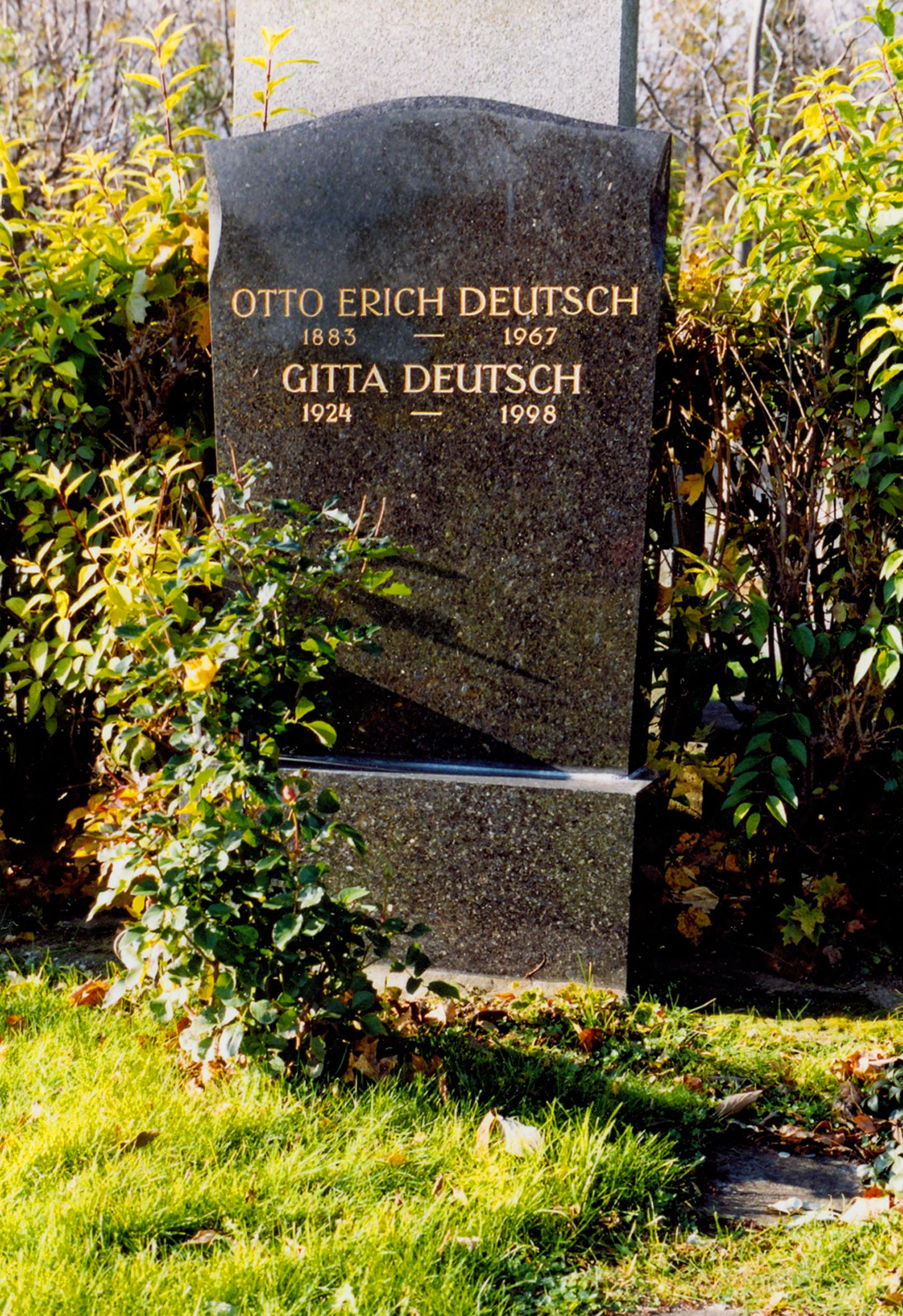
Deutsch's grave in the Vienna Central Cemetery

Deutsch died in Baden bei Wien on 23 November 1967 at the age of 84. He is interred in an honorary grave of the Vienna Central Cemetery (group 40, no. 12).

== Scholarship ==
According to David Wyn Jones, Deutsch's work was based on "an abiding belief that historical documents and iconographic evidence constituted the essential ingredients of biographical exposition." Hence, Deutsch composed "documentary biographies" of Schubert, Mozart and Handel; in them, the texts of the old documents are placed in chronological order, strung together with narration and commentary by Deutsch. In these biographies, Deutsch lets the documents speak for themselves, with his supplementary remarks providing clarifications, corrections, and context.

Deutsch also prepared conventional scholarly articles on these composers as well as on Joseph Haydn. He also edited and published musical texts, in particular Haydn's output of canons.

He was awarded the Austrian Cross of Honour for Science and Art, 1st class in 1959.

== Works ==
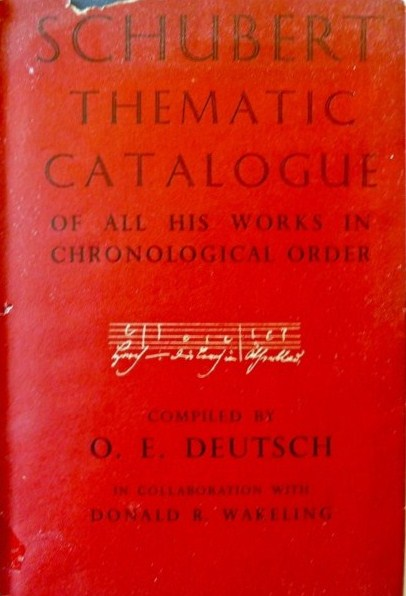
Deutsch Catalogue, first edition 1951

- Deutsch, Otto Erich (1955). Handel: A Documentary Biography. New York, W.W. Norton.
- Deutsch, Otto Erich (1965). Mozart: A Documentary Biography. Stanford: Stanford University Press. (English translation of Deutsch's German original. Eric Blom provided many translations for this work)
- Deutsch, Otto Erich (1951). Schubert: Thematic Catalogue of all his works in chronological order. Dent.

== Films ==
- D 795 oder Die schöne Müllerin. Otto Erich Deutsch – Ein Leben für die Musik, film by Claus Spahn, ARD 1983, 60 min.

== See also ==
- List of compositions by Franz Schubert
- List of compositions by Franz Schubert by genre
