= Brian Newbould =

English composer, conductor & author (born 1936)

Brian Newbould (born 26 February 1936) is an English composer, conductor and author who has conjecturally completed Franz Schubert's Symphonies D 708A in D major, No. 7 in E major, No. 8 in B minor ("Unfinished"), No. 10 ("Last") in D major, Piano Sonata in C major, D 840, Quartettsatz, D. 703 and String Trio, D. 471. He was educated at Gravesend Grammar School, and earned a BMus degree with top honors from the University of Bristol.

== Schubert's Eighth Symphony ==
The first two movements of Schubert's Eighth or "Unfinished" Symphony, an Allegro moderato in B minor and an Andante con moto in E major, completed in the Autumn of 1822, were sequestered by Anselm Hüttenbrenner in Graz after Schubert had sent them to him in full score in fulfillment of a commission by the Graz musical society. They were not discovered and conducted until 1865, when Johann Herbeck visited the aging Hüttenbrenner and persuaded him to show him, and lend him, the MS of the legendary rumored missing Schubert B minor Symphony in return for promising to conduct a still unperformed overture of Hüttenbrenner's. The last pages of the Schubert MS contained a sketch of the projected third movement (a scherzo in B major with trio in G major) ultimately completed by Newbould by (1) simply orchestrating the scherzo proper, completed by Schubert in short score, (2) harmonizing and orchestrating the first strain of the trio of which Schubert had written out only the unharmonized melodic line, (3) conjecturally composing the second strain of the trio, entirely missing in the MS, in the Schubert style with contrasting material followed by a return of the theme of the first strain adding slight embellishments in the Schubert manner, and (4) proposing that the large-scale B minor first entr'acte of the Rosamunde incidental music composed several months later in early 1823 by Schubert be played as the likely intended finale of the B minor Symphony since it matched the first movement, and the sketch of the scherzo, in key and style and was composed shortly afterward.

== Schubert's Tenth Symphony ==
Newbould went on to unravel, piece together and orchestrate (following the composer's few notations for intended instruments) Schubert's Tenth Symphony from unsequenced but nearly complete rough MS drafts for a lyrical sonata-form first movement in D major, a monumentally heroic slow movement in B minor and a sonata-form finale in D major dated by him (by the water-marks of the MS paper and by interspersed counterpoint exercises most likely as homework for the one lesson Schubert was able to take from illustrious private teacher Simon Sechter, who subsequently taught the young Anton Bruckner, before Schubert succumbed to typhus a few weeks later, on 19 November) as most probably composed in fall 1828 as his last symphonic work, to be followed only by the song with clarinet obligato, "Der Hirt auf dem Felsen."

Newbould also produced a conjectural completion of Schubert's fragmentary Symphony No. 7 in E major.

Both Sir Charles Mackerras and Sir Neville Marriner have conducted recorded performances of Newbould's conjectural completions of these Schubert "unfinished symphonies".
