= List of compositions by Franz Schubert (1814) =

Franz Schubert's compositions of 1814 are mostly in the Deutsch catalogue (D) range D 92–126, and include:

- Instrumental works:
  - Symphony No. 2, D 125 (started December 1814)
  - String Quartet No. 7, D 94
  - Quartettsatz, D 103
  - String Quartet No. 8, D 112
- Vocal music:
  - Mass No. 1, D 105
  - "Gretchen am Spinnrade", D 118
  - "Sehnsucht", D 123

== Table ==
=== Legend ===
Legend to the table
| column | | content |
|---|---|---|
| 1 | D '51 | Deutsch number in the first version of the Deutsch catalogue (1951) |
| 2 | D utd | most recent (utd = up to date) Deutsch catalogue number; the basic collation of the list is according to these numbers – whether or not the possibility to adjust the sorting according to the content of other columns is available depends on the device with which the table is displayed. |
| 3 | Op. pbl | Opus number (Op.; p indicates Post. = posthumous) and date of first publication (pbl; between brackets; when there is more than one date the earlier dates indicate partial publications). The column sorts to Opus number, then (earliest of) the publication date(s) |
| 4 | AGA | Alte Gesamt-Ausgabe = Franz Schubert's Werke: Kritisch durchgesehene Gesammtausgabe. Indicates genre/instrumentation: Series I: Symphonien (Nos. 1-8) (Johannes Brahms, 1884); Series II: Overtüren und Andere Orchesterwerke (Johann Nepomuk Fuchs, 1886); Series III: Oktette (Nos. 1-3) and IV: Streichquintett (Eusebius Mandyczewski, 1889); Series V: Streichquartette (Nos. 1-15) (Joseph Hellmesberger and Eusebius Mandyczewski, 1890); Series VI: Trio für Streichinstrumente (Eusebius Mandyczewski, 1892); Series VII: Trios, Quartets and Quintets with Piano and VIII: Pianoforte und Ein Instrument (Ignaz Brüll, 1886); Series IX: Pianoforte zu vier Händen (Anton Door, 1888); Series X: Sonaten für Pianoforte (Julius Epstein, 1888); Series XI: Fantasie, Impromptus und andere Stücke für Pianoforte (Julius Epstein, 1888); Series XII: Tänze für Pianoforte (Nos. 1-31) (Julius Epstein, 1889); Series XIII: Messen (Nos. 1-7) (Eusebius Mandyczewski, 1887); Series XIV: Kleinere Kirchenmusikwerke (Nos. 1-22) (Eusebius Mandyczewski, 1888); Series XV: Dramatische Musik (Johann Nepomuk Fuchs, 1893); Series XVI: Werke für Männerchor (Nos. 1-46) (Eusebius Mandyczewski, 1891); Series XVII: Werke für gemischten Chor (Nos. 1-19) (Josef Gänsbacher, Eusebius Mandyczewski, 1892); Series XVIII: Werke für Drei und mehr Frauenstimmen mit Pianoforte-Begleitung (Nos. 1-6) (Josef Gänsbacher, Eusebius Mandyczewski, 1891); Series XIX: Kleine Gesangswerke (Nos. 1-36) (Josef Gänsbacher and Eusebius Mandyczewski, 1892); Series XX: Sämtliche einstimmige Lieder und Gesänge (Eusebius Mandyczewski, 1894-1895); Series XXI: Supplement (Eusebius Mandyczewski, 1897); 1. Instrumentalmusik No. 1-5; 2. Instrumentalmusik No. 6-13; 3. Instrumentalmusik No. 14-; 4. Gesangsmusik; Series XXII: Revisionsbericht |
| 5 | NSA | NGA/NSA/NSE = New Schubert Edition, also indicates genre/instrumentation: Series I: Church Music; Series II: Stage Works; Series III: Part Songs; Series IV: Lieder; Series V: Orchestral Works; Series VI: Chamber Music; 1. Octet and Nonet; 2. String Quintet; 3. String Quartets I; 4. String Quartets II; 5. String Quartets III; 6. String Trios; 7. Works for Piano and several instruments; 8. Works for Piano and one instrument; 9. Dances for several instruments; Series VII: Piano Music; 1. Works for Piano Four Hands; 2. Works for Piano Two Hands; Series VIII: Supplement, 2. Schubert's Studies |
| 6 | Name | unique name, with, if available, a link to the relevant encyclopedia article; sorts by name with initial definite ("Der", "Die", "Das", ...) or indefinite ("Ein", "A", ...) articles, and numbers, moved after the expression they qualify: e.g. "Die Hoffnung, ..." sorts as "Hoffnung, Die, ..." – "Thirty Minuets ..." sorts as "Minuets, 30, ...". |
| 7 | Key / incipit | incipit mostly for songs (linking to lyrics and their translation, for instance at The LiederNet Archive, when available), other compositions by key, except for Schubert's stage works: type of composition in brackets. |
| 8 | Date | (presumed) date of composition, or, for copies and arrangements, date of Schubert's autograph. Sorts to earliest possible date of completion, unlike the chronology of the Deutsch catalogue that generally collates according to earliest date associated with the composition: e.g. Schubert started the composition of his 3rd String Quartet on 19 November 1812 and completed it on 21 February 1813 – in the Deutsch catalogue the composition is grouped with other compositions from 1812: when using the sort function of the 8th column the composition is grouped with compositions completed in 1813 |
| 9 | Additional info | may include: Information about the text (lyrics, libretto) of vocal compositions: e.g., "Text by [text author]", "Text: [standard lyrics]", "... from [literary work]"; "other settings: D ..." indicates Schubert's other settings of the same text; for fields starting with "Text ..." this column sorts by text author (last name, first name—or pen name when such name is more established), then incipit of the lyrics (alternatively, when the incipit is rarely used, title of the work); Information about the authenticity of the composition: the work is without doubt Schubert's unless when marked as "Doubtful", "Spurious?" or "Spurious" (in the last case columns 3–8 give no further information about the composition); Forces needed for performance ("For ..."): may be omitted when the type of composition makes the instrumentation clear (e.g. String Quartet → two violins, viola and cello), and, for vocal music, when the setting is for voice and piano; "s", "a", "t" and "b" refer to a single soprano, alto, tenor and bass singer respectively, while "S", "A", "T" and "B" to choral parts for the same types of singers (see SATB).; Specifications regarding movements (e.g. "Allegro – Minuet – Rondo") or sections (e.g. "No. 1 ..."); Information about the completeness of the extant work: the work is considered complete as extant unless when marked "Sketch", "Incomplete", "Unfinished", "Fragment" or "Lost"; Information about versions (e.g. "Two versions: ...") |

=== List ===
Compositions by Franz Schubert listed in the Deutsch catalogue for 1814
| D '51 | D utd | Op. pbl | AGA | NSA | Name | Key / incipit | Date | Additional info |
|---|---|---|---|---|---|---|---|---|
| 93 | 93 | (1894) | XX, 1 Nos. 13–15 | IV, 7 Anh. No. 1 | Don Gayseros | 1. Don Gayseros,... wunderlicher, schöner Ritter – 2. Nächtens klang die süße Laute – 3. An dem jungen Morgenhimmel | 1815? | Text by Motte Fouqué, from Der Zauberring; Nos. 2 and 3 incomplete |
| 94 | 94 | (1871) | V No. 7 | VI, 3 No. 2 | String Quartet No. 7 | D major | 1811 or 1812? | Allegro (partly reused in D 12) – Andante con moto – Minuet – Presto |
| | 94A | | | II, 1 V, 6 No. 6 | Orchestral piece, D 94A | B♭ major | c. 1814 | Fragment; For 1st version of D 84, Act III? |
| | 94B | | | VI, 9 | Five Minuets and Six German Dances, D 94B | | 1814 | For string quartet and two horns; Lost |
| 95 | 95 | (1848) | XX, 1 No. 25 | IV, 7 No. 1 | Adelaide | Einsam wandelt dein Freund | 1814 | Text by Matthisson |
| 97 | 97 | (1894) | XX, 1 No. 19 | IV, 7 No. 2 | Trost: An Elisa | Lehnst du deine bleichgehärmte Wange | 1814 | Text by Matthisson |
| 98 | 98 | (1894) (1968) | XX, 1 No. 24 | IV, 7 No. 3 Anh. No. 2 | Erinnerungen, D 98 | Am Seegestad, in lauen Vollmondsnächten | fall 1814 | Text by Matthisson (other setting: D 424); Two versions: 1st is fragment, 2nd in AGA |
| 99 | 99 | (1894) | XX, 1 No. 16 | IV, 7 No. 4 | Andenken, D 99 | Ich denke dein wenn durch den Hain | April 1814 | Text by Matthisson (other setting: D 423) |
| 100 | 100 | (1894) | XX, 1 No. 17 | IV, 7 No. 5 | Geisternähe | Der Dämm’rung Schein durchblinkt den Hain | April 1814 | Text by Matthisson |
| 101 | 101 | (1894) | XX, 1 No. 18 | IV, 7 No. 6 | Erinnerung, D 101, a.k.a. Todtenopfer | Kein Rosenschimmer leuchtet | April 1814 | Text by Matthisson |
| 102 | 102 | (1840) | XX, 1 No. 20 | IV, 7 No. 7 | Die Betende | Laura betet! | fall 1814 | Text by Matthisson; Partly reused in D 918 |
| 103 | 103 | (1939) | | VI, 4 Anh. No. 3 | Quartettsatz, D 103 | C minor | 23/4/1814 | Grave, Allegro (fragment); Completed by Alfred Orel in 1st ed. |
| 104 | 104 | (1895) | XX, 10; No. 584 | IV, 7 No. 8 & Anh. No. 3 | Die Befreier Europas in Paris | Sie sind in Paris! | 16/5/1814 | Text by Mikan; Two drafts and a final version |
| 105; 185 | 105 | (1856) | XIII, 1 No. 1 | I, 1a | Mass No. 1 | F major Kyrie – Gloria – Credo – Sanctus & Benedictus – Agnus Dei | 17/5/1814– 22/7/1814 | Text: Mass ordinary (other settings: D 24E, 31, 45, 49, 56, 66, 167, 324, 452, 678, 755 and 950); For ssattbSATB and orchestra; 2nd setting of Dona nobis pacem was D 185; Partly reused in D 484 |
| 106 | 106 | (1888) | XIV No. 9 | I, 8 | Salve Regina, D 106 | B♭ major Salve Regina | 28/6/1814– 1/7/1814 | Text: Salve Regina (other settings: D 27, 223, 386, 676 and 811); For t and orchestra |
| 107 | 107 | (1894) (1968) | XX, 1 No. 21 | IV, 7 No. 9 | Lied aus der Ferne | Wenn in des Abends letztem Scheine | July 1814 | Text by Matthisson; Two versions: 1st in AGA |
| 108 | 108 | (1894) | XX, 1 No. 22 | IV, 7 No. 10 | Der Abend, D 108 | Purpur malt die Tannenhügel | July 1814 | Text by Matthisson |
| 109 | 109 | (1894) | XX, 1 No. 23 | IV, 7 No. 11 | Lied der Liebe | Durch Fichten am Hügel | July 1814 | Text by Matthisson |
| 110 | 110 | (1891) | XVI; No. 43 | III, 1 | Wer ist groß? | Wer ist wohl groß? | 24/7/1814– 25/7/1814 | For bTTBB and orchestra |
| 111 | 77 | | | | | | | See D 77 |
| | 111A | | | VI, 6 Anh. No. 1 | String Trio, D 111A | B♭ major | 5/9/1814– 13/9/1814 | Allegro (fragment); early version of D 112 |
| 112 | 112 | 168p (1863) | V No. 8 | VI, 4 No. 10 | String Quartet No. 8 | B♭ major | 5/9/1814– 13/9/1814 | Allegro ma non troppo – Andante sostenuto – Minuet – Presto; Based on D 111A |
| 113 | 113 | 58,2 (1821) (1826) (1894) | XX, 1 No. 26 | IV, 3 | An Emma | Weit in nebelgrauer Ferne | 17/9/1814 | Text by Schiller; Three versions: 2nd publ. in 1821 – 3rd is Op. 58 No. 2 |
| 114 | 114 | (1868) (1901) | XX, 1 No. 27 | IV, 7 No. 12 & Anh. No. 4 | Romanze, D 114 | Ein Fräulein klagt' im finstern Turm | September; 1814 | Text by Matthisson; Two versions: 2nd in AGA |
| 115 | 115 | (1840) | XX, 1 No. 28 | IV, 7 No. 13 | An Laura, als sie Klopstocks Auferstehungslied sang | Herzen, die gen Himmel sich erheben | 2/10/1814– 7/10/1814 | Text by Matthisson |
| 116 | 116 | (1840) | XX, 1 No. 29 | IV, 7 No. 14 | Der Geistertanz, D 116 | Die bretterne Kammer der Toten erbebt | 14/10/1814 | Text by Matthisson (other settings: D 15, 15A and 494) |
| 117 | 117 | (1894) | XX, 1 No. 30 | IV, 8 No. 45 | Das Mädchen aus der Fremde, D 117 | In einem Tal bei armen Hirten | 16/10/1814 | Text by Schiller (other setting: D 252) |
| 118 | 118 | 2 (1821) | XX, 1 No. 31 | IV, 1a | Gretchen am Spinnrade | Meine Ruh' ist hin | 19/10/1814 | Text by Goethe, from Faust I, 15 |
| 119 | 119 | (1850) | XX, 1 No. 32 | IV, 7 No. 15 | Nachtgesang, D 119 | O! gib vom weichen Pfühle | 30/11/1814 | Text by Goethe |
| 120 | 120 | (1835) | XX, 1 No. 33 | IV, 7 No. 16 | Trost in Tränen | Wie kommt's, daß du so traurig bist | 30/11/1814 | Text by Goethe |
| 121 | 121 | 3,1 (1821) (1894) | XX, 1 No. 34 | IV, 1a & b No. 2 | Schäfers Klagelied | Da droben auf jenem Berge | 30/11/1814– 28/2/1819? | Text by Goethe; Two versions: 1st is Op. 3 No. 1 – 2nd composed for 28/2/1819? |
| 122 | 122 | (1872) | XX, 1 No. 38 | IV, 7 No. 17 | Ammenlied | Am hohen, hohen Turm | early Dec. 1814 | Text by Lubi |
| 123 | 123 | (1842) | XX, 1 No. 35 | IV, 7 No. 18 | Sehnsucht, D 123 | Was zieht mir das Herz so? | 3/12/1814 | Text by Goethe |
| 124 | 124 | (1885) (1894) (1968) | XX, 1 No. 36 | IV, 7 No. 19 & Anh. No. 7 | Am See, D 124 | Sitz' ich im Gras am glatten See | 3/12/1814– 7/12/1814 | Text by Mayrhofer; Two versions: 1st is fragment – 2nd, modified in 1885 publ., in AGA |
| 125 | 125 | (1884) | I, 1 No. 2 | V, 1 No. 2 | Symphony No. 2 | B♭ major | 10/12/1814– 24/3/1815 | Largo, Allegro vivace – Andante – Minuet – Presto vivace |
| 126 | 126 | (1832) (1873) | XX, 1 No. 37 | IV, 7 No. 20 & Anh. No. 8 | Scene from Faust | Wie anders, Gretchen, war dir's | early Dec.– 12/12/1814 | Text by Goethe, from Faust I, 20; Two versions: 2nd, publ. in 1832, in AGA |

== Sources ==
Multi-volume editions, websites and catalogues

- Alte Gesamt-Ausgabe (AGA) = Franz Schubert's Works: Schubert, Franz (1884–1897). Johannes Brahms; Ignaz Brüll; Anton Door; Julius Epstein; Johann Nepomuk Fuchs; Josef Gänsbacher; Joseph Hellmesberger Sr.; Eusebius Mandyczewski (eds.). Franz Schubert's Werke: Kritisch durchgesehene Gesammtausgabe (in German). Leipzig: Breitkopf & Härtel. Reprints of several volumes by Kalmus and Dover Publications; Franz Schubert's Werke (Series I–XIX and XXI), Series XX, Revisionsbericht: Scores at the International Music Score Library Project
- Deutsch catalogue (D) = Schubert Thematic Catalogue:
  - Deutsch, Otto Erich; et al. (Donald R. Wakeling) (1951). Schubert: Thematic Catalogue of all his Works in Chronological Order (1st ed.). London: Dent. 1995 reprint, with errata correction: Deutsch, Otto Erich; et al. (Donald R. Wakeling) (1995). The Schubert Thematic Catalogue (Dover ed.). Mineola, N.Y.: Dover Publications. ISBN 0486286851.
  - Deutsch, Otto Erich (1978). Walther Dürr; Arnold Feil; Christa Landon [in German]; Werner Aderhold (eds.). Franz Schubert: Thematisches Verzeichnis seiner Werke in chronologischer Folge. New Schubert Edition (in German). Kassel: Bärenreiter. ISBN 9783761805718. ISMN 9790006305148.
    - Series VIII (Supplement)
    - Volume 4
- Hoboken catalogue (Hob.): "Joseph Haydn (1732–1809): Werke sortiert nach Hob (Hoboken-Verzeichnis, 1957-78)" (in German). Kaiserslautern: Klassika.
- Köchel catalogue (K.): "Wolfgang Amadeus Mozart (1756–1791): Werke sortiert nach KV^{6} (Köchel-Verzeichnis, 6. Auflage, 1964)" (in German). Kaiserslautern: Klassika.
- Neue Schubert-Ausgabe (NSA) = New Schubert Edition:
  - NSA scores: Schubert, Franz (1968–2019). International Schubert Association (Tübingen) (ed.). Franz Schubert (1797–1828): New Edition of the Complete Works (in German). Kassel: Bärenreiter. [over 80 volumes in eight series] Individual volumes:
    - NSA II, 15: Schubert, Franz; Neumann, Johann Philipp (2008). Jahrmärker, Manuela; Aigner, Thomas (eds.). Sacontala. New Schubert Edition (in German). Kassel: Bärenreiter. ISMN 9790006497294.
      - Series II (Stage Works), Vol. 15
    - NSA VIII, 4: See above Deutsch (1978)
  - NSA website: "New Schubert Edition". Tübingen: International Schubert Association.
- Schubert Online: "www.schubert-online.at: Schubert music manuscripts, first and early editions online". Vienna: Austrian Academy of Sciences (ÖAW).
- The LiederNet Archive: Ezust, Emily; et al. (LiederNet contributors). "Composer: Franz Peter Schubert (1797 - 1828)". Ontario: LiederNet Corporation.

Other

- Badura-Skoda, Eva; Branscombe, Peter, eds. (2008). Schubert Studies: Problems of Style and Chronology. Cambridge University Press. ISBN 0521088720.
  - Walther Dürr "Schubert's Songs and Their Poetry" pp. 1–24
  - Rufus Hallmark "Schubert's 'Auf dem Strom'" pp. 25–46
  - Elaine Brody "Schubert and Sulzer Revisited" pp. 47–60
  - Marius Flothuis "Schubert Revises Schubert" pp. 61–84
  - Elizabeth Norman McKay "Schubert as Composer of Operas" pp. 85–104
  - Peter Branscombe "Schubert and the Melodrama" pp. 105–142
  - Christoph Wolff "Schubert's 'Der Tod und dad Mädchen'" pp. 143–172
  - Peter Gülke on String Quintet D 956 pp. 173–186
  - Paul Badura-Skoda on Schubert's 'Great' C major Symphony pp. 187–208
  - Robert Winter "Paper Studies and the Future of Schubert Research" pp. 209–276
  - Eva Badura-Skoda "The Chronology of Schubert's Piano Trios" pp. 277–296
  - Reinhard Van Hoorickx "The Chronology of Schubert's Fragments and Sketches" pp. 297–326
  - Arnold Feil "Rhythm in Schubert" pp. 327–346
  - Alexander Weinmann on Leopold Puschl and Schubert's sojourn in Zseliz pp. 347–356
- Elsholz, Gunter (1982). Vogel, Reimut (ed.). Franz Schubert: Sinfonie in E-Dur 1825. Stuttgart: Goldoni. ISBN 3922044050. OCLC 987719669.
- Hilmar, Ernst; Jestremski, Margret, eds. (2004). Schubert-Enzyklopädie (in German). Vol. 1. Introduction by Alfred Brendel. Tutzing: Hans Schneider. ISBN 3795211557.
- Keefe, Simon P., ed. (2006). Mozart Studies. Cambridge University Press. ISBN 0521851025.
- Kube, Michael (2009). "Franz Schuberts Deutsche Trauermesse (D 621) als Problem der Text- und Stilkritik". In Mitterauer, Gertraud; Müller, Ulrich; Springeth, Margarete; Vitzthum, Verena (eds.). Was ist Textkritik?: Zur Geschichte und Relevanz eines Zentralbegriffs der Editionswissenschaft (in German). Walter de Gruyter. pp. 129–140. ISBN 3484970782.
- Mozart, Wolfgang Amadeus; Haydn, Joseph; Haydn, Michael (2008). Kircher, Armin (ed.). Chorbuch Mozart • Haydn VII: Kanonsammlung [Choral Collection Mozart • Haydn, Vol. VII: Canon Collection] (in German, Latin, English, and Italian). Stuttgart: Carus-Verlag. OCLC 274222567.
- Newbould, Brian (1999). Schubert: The Music and the Man. University of California Press. ISBN 0520219570.
- Reed, John (1997). The Schubert Song Companion. Manchester University Press. ISBN 1901341003.
- Van Hoorickx, Reinhard (1971). "Franz Schubert (1797–1828) List of the Dances in Chronological Order". Revue belge de Musicologie / Belgisch Tijdschrift voor Muziekwetenschap. 25 (1). Belgian Musicological Society: 68–97. doi:10.2307/3686180. ISSN 0771-6788. JSTOR 3686180.
- Van Hoorickx, Reinhard (1974–1976). "Thematic Catalogue of Schubert's Works: New Additions, Corrections and Notes". Revue belge de Musicologie / Belgisch Tijdschrift voor Muziekwetenschap. 28–30. Belgian Musicological Society: 136–171. doi:10.2307/3686053. ISSN 0771-6788. JSTOR 3686053.
