= 1814 in music =

== Events ==
- Invention of the metronome by Johann Nepomuk Mälzel
- February 27 – Première of Beethoven's Eighth Symphony in Vienna
- September 14 – Francis Scott Key, inspired by the sight of the American flag over Fort McHenry, writes the lyrics of "The Star-Spangled Banner".
- November – Romani composer János Bihari plays to the court during the Congress of Vienna.

== Classical music ==
- Ludwig van Beethoven
  - Polonaise in C major, Op. 89
  - Piano Sonata No. 27 in E minor, Op. 90
  - Merkenstein, Op. 100
  - Overture in C major, Op. 115
  - Elegischer Gesang, Op. 118
  - Der glorreiche Augenblick, Op. 136 (Cantata)
  - Germania, WoO 94
  - Chorus for the Allied Princes, WoO 95
  - Abschiedsgesang, WoO 102
  - Des Krieger's Abschied, WoO 143
  - Merkenstein, WoO 144
  - Resignation, WoO 149
  - 20 Irish Songs, WoO 153
- Johann Ludwig Böhner – Fantaisie and Variations for Clarinet and Orchestra, Op. 21
- Luigi Cherubini – String Quartet No.1
- Franz Danzi – Horn Sonata, Op. 44
- Anton Diabelli – 30 Sehr leichte übungsstücke, Op. 39
- Friedrich Ernst Fesca – 3 String Quartets, Op. 1
- John Field
  - Piano Concerto No.4, H 28
  - Nocturnes Nos. 1, 2, and 3 for piano
- Mauro Giuliani – 6 Variations on 'I bin a Kohlbauern Bub', Op. 49
- Johann Nepomuk Hummel
  - Serenade No.1, Op. 63
  - Piano Trio in G major, Op. 65
  - Serenade No.2, Op. 66
  - Piano Concerto No.4, Op. 110
  - 6 Polonaises for piano
- Franz Krommer – Concerto No.2 for 2 Clarinets, Op.91
- Nikolaus von Krufft – Sonata for Horn and Piano
- Friedrich Kuhlau – Rondo, WoO 203
- Ferdinand Ries
  - Symphony No. 2 in C minor, op. 80
  - Symphony No.5, Op. 112 (premiered Feb. 14 in London)
  - Sextet, Op. 142
  - 3 Flute Quartets, Op. 145
  - Sonate sentimentale, Op. 169
- Franz Schubert
  - String Quartet No.7, D.94
  - Trost: an Elisa, D.97
  - Die Betende, D. 102
  - String Quartet Movement, D. 103
  - Die Befreier Europas in Paris, D. 104
  - Mass No.1, D. 105
  - Wer ist gross?, D.110
  - String Quartet No.8, D. 112
  - An Emma, D. 113
  - Der Geistertanz, D. 116
  - Gretchen am Spinnrade, D. 118
  - Schäfers Klagelied, D. 121
  - Am See, D.124
  - Symphony No.2, D.125
  - Ballade, D. 134
  - Tantum ergo, D. 739
- Louis Spohr
  - Violin Concerto No. 7 in E minor, Op. 38
  - Das befreite Deutschland (cantata), WoO 64
- Carl Maria von Weber – Piano Sonata No.2 in A-flat major, Op. 39
- Johann Wilhelm Wilms – Wilhelmus van Nassauwe, Op.37

== Opera ==
- Ludwig van Beethoven – Fidelio (Vienna, 3rd version)
- Johann Nepomuk Hummel – Die Eselshaut, S.101
- Friedrich Kuhlau – Røverborgen (The Robbers' Castle)
- Giovanni Pacini – La ballerina raggiratrice
- Gioacchino Rossini
  - Il Turco in Italia
  - Sigismondo, premiered Dec. 26 in Venice.
- Franz Schubert – Des Teufels Lustschloss, D.84

== Popular music ==
- "All the World's in Paris" sung by Joseph Grimaldi in Harlequin Whittington
- "Sadak and Kalasrade, or the Waters of Oblivion" by Henry Bishop
- "The Star-Spangled Banner" by Francis Scott Key

== Publications ==
- Johann Friedrich Wilhelm Koch – Gesanglehre
- Anton Reicha – Traité de mélodie

== Births ==
- January – Heinrich Wilhelm Ernst, violinist and composer (died 1865)
- January 26 – Jean-Chrysostome Brauneis II, organist, composer and teacher, the first Canadian to study music in Europe (died 1871)
- February 21
  - Nicolò Gabrielli, opera composer (died 1891)
  - Franz Hoffmann, publisher (died 1882)
- February 26 – Giuseppe Lillo, opera composer (died 1863)
- March 3 – Charles Kensington Salaman, pianist and composer (died 1901)
- April 9 – Félix Battanchon, composer and cellist (died 1893)
- April 21 – Béni Egressy, composer and librettist (died 1851)
- May 1 – Emma Albertazzi, contralto (died 1847)
- May 7 – Henriette Hansen, Norwegian ballerina, singer and actor (died 1892)
- May 9 – John Brougham, lyricist and librettist (died 1880)
- May 10 – Stanislas Verroust, oboist and composer (died 1863)
- May 12 – Adolf von Henselt, pianist and composer (died 1889)
- May 25 – William H. C. Hosmer, lyricist (died 1877)
- June 14 – Alexander John Ellis, musicologist (died 1890)
- July 2 – Thérèse Wartel, pianist and composer (died 1865)
- July 15 – Edward Caswall, hymnist (died 1878)
- October 28 – Annette Julie Nicolò-Isouard, composer (died 1876)
- November 6 – Adolphe Sax, inventor of the saxophone (died 1894)
- December 19 – Robert Campbell, hymnist (died 1868)

== Deaths ==
- January 4 – Johann Georg Jacobi, lyricist and poet (born 1740)
- February 3 – Jan Antonín Koželuh, composer (born 1738)
- April 12 – Charles Burney, English music historian (born 1726)
- April 15 – Karl Alois, dedicatee and patron (born 1761)
- April 30 – Joseph Harris, composer and organist (born 1745)
- May 6 – Georg Joseph Vogler, organist, composer and music theorist (born 1749)
- June 8 – Friedrich Heinrich Himmel, composer (born 1765)
- June 19 – Friedrich Wilhelm Heinrich Benda, musician (born 1745)
- June 27 – Johann Friedrich Reichardt, composer and music critic (born 1752)
- July 14 – Giovanna Sestini, opera singer (b. ca 174)
- July 25
  - Charles Dibdin, musician, songwriter, author of A Musical Tour through England (born c. 1745)
  - Franz Xaver Huber, librettist (born 1755)
- August 19 – Angelo Tarchi, opera composer (born c. 1760)
- September 1 – Erik Tulindberg, first Finnish classical composer of note (born 1761)
