= 1779 in music =

== Events ==
- February 16 – Composer William Boyce is buried in St Paul's Cathedral. The music at his funeral features the massed choirs of St Paul's itself, Westminster Abbey and the Chapel Royal.
- March 7 – Griffith Jones, aged about 21, is recommended for membership of the Royal Society of Musicians.
- April – The London Magazine reports on the organ-playing of three-year-old prodigy William Crotch.
- December 26 – Teatro alla Scala in Milan opens its operatic carnival season with Josef Mysliveček's new opera Armida.
- The opera house at Eszterháza burns down.
- Mezzo-soprano Luigia Polzelli and her violinist husband Antonio arrive at the Esterházy court, where she quickly becomes the lover of Joseph Haydn.

== Opera ==
- Johann Christian Bach – Amadis de Gaule (premiered Dec. 14 in Paris)
- Domenico Cimarosa
  - L'infedeltà fedele
  - L'italiana in Londra (premiered Dec. 28 in Rome)
  - Il matrimonio per raggiro
- Christoph Willibald Gluck – Iphigénie en Tauride (premiered May 18 in Paris)
- André Ernest Modeste Grétry – L'amant jaloux (first published, premiered 1778)
- Joseph Haydn – L'isola disabitata
- Wolfgang Amadeus Mozart – Zaide
- Giovanni Paisiello – Demetrio, R.1.59
- Antonio Salieri – Il Talismano

== Classical music ==
- Anna Amalia – Organ Trio in C major
- Carl Philipp Emanuel Bach
  - Clavier-Sonaten für Kenner und Liebhaber, Wq.55
  - Rondo in E major, Wq. 57, H.265
  - Rondo in F major, Wq. 57, H.266
- Claude-Bénigne Balbastre – Sonates en Quatuor, Op. 3 (Paris)
- William Billings – Music in Miniature
- William Boyce – 10 Voluntaries for the Organ
- Muzio Clementi
  - 6 Sonatas, Op. 2
  - 3 Piano Duets and 3 Sonatas, Op. 3
- François Joseph Gossec – Symphonie Concertante du Ballet de Mirza, B.90
- Joseph Haydn
  - Symphony No. 70 in D major
  - Symphony No. 71 in B-flat major, Hob.I:71
  - Symphony No. 75 in D Major
  - Aria: "Quando la rosa"
- Michael Haydn – Symphony No.23 in D major, MH 287, P.43
- Johann Adam Hiller – "Lieder und Arien aus Sophiens Reise", compilation including pieces from Mozart.
- Wolfgang Amadeus Mozart
  - Kommet her, ihr frechen Sünder, K.146/317b
  - Mass in C major, K.317 (Composed March 23, Premiered April 4 in Salzburg)
  - Symphony No.32 in G major, K.318 (Composed April 26)
  - Symphony No.33 in B-flat major, K.319
  - Serenade in D major, "Posthorn" K.320
  - Vesperae solennes de Dominica in C. K.321
  - Church Sonata in C major, K.329/317a
  - 2 Marches, K.335/320a
  - Sinfonia Concertante for Violin, Viola and Orchestra in E-flat major, K.364/320d
  - Concerto in E-flat major for Two Pianos, K.365/316a
- Johann Heinrich Rolle – Thirza und ihre Söhne (oratorio)
- Johann Adolph Hasse - Mass in E-flat major
- Joseph Bologne Saint-Georges – 2 Symphonies, Op.11
- Antonio Salieri – Organ Concerto in C major
- William Shrubsole – "Miles's Lane (All Hail The Power of Jesus' Name)", in The Gospel Magazine and Moral Miscellany, Vol.6.
- Maria Carolina Wolf – "Die Rose"
- Carl Friedrich Zelter – Viola Concerto in E-flat major

== Methods and theory writings ==
- Joseph Amiot – Mémoire sur la musique des Chinois
- Anton Bemitzrieder – Nouvel essai sur l'harmonie
- François Vincent Corbelin – Méthode de Harpe
- Franz Paul Rigler – Anleitung zum Klavier
- Francisco Inácio Solano – Novo tratado de musica metrica, e rythmica
- Francesco Antonio Vallotti – Della scienza teorica e pratica della moderna musica (On the scientific theory and practice of modern music)

== Births ==
- January 8 – John White, organist and composer
- January 15 – Jean Coralli, ballet producer and choreographer
- February 1 – Nikolaus von Krufft, Austrian composer (died 1818)
- February 2 – Georg Heinrich Lux, organist and composer (died 1861)
- February 5 – François van Campenhout, singer and composer (d. 1848)
- February 17 – Wilhelm Friedrich Riem, composer (died 1857)
- February 22 – Joachim Nicolas Eggert, composer (d. 1813)
- February 23 – Johann Caspar Aiblinger, composer (d. 1867)
- February 28 – Henry Darondeau, composer (died 1865)
- March 1 – Jacob Gottfried Weber, composer (d. 1839)
- March 13 – Oliver Shaw, composer (d. 1848)
- April 11 – Louise Reichardt, German composer (died 1826)
- April 21 – William Knyvett, composer
- May 28 – Thomas Moore, poet and lyricist
- June 23 – Johann Baptist Schiedermayr, composer (died 1840)
- July 20 – Ignaz Schuster, bass and composer (died 1835)
- August 1 – Francis Scott Key, songwriter (died 1843)
- September 8 – Johann Philipp Samuel Schmidt, composer (died 1853)
- September 10 – Louis Alexandre Piccinni, composer
- October 15
  - August Ferdinand Häser, composer (died 1844)
  - Johan Olof Wallin, songwriting bishop
- November 14 – Adam Oehlenschläger poet and lyricist (died 1850)
- date unknown
  - Georges-Joseph-Laurent Lambert, composer (died 1852)

== Deaths ==
- January 20 – David Garrick, librettist (born 1717)
- February 7 – William Boyce, composer, 69
- February 12 – Hinrich Philip Johnsen, composer (born 1717)
- April 6 – Tommaso Traetta, composer, 52
- April 7 – Martha Ray, singer, 32/33 (murdered)
- June 6 – Joseph Inchbald, actor and singer, 44
- November 27 – Josse Boutmy, organist and harpsichordist, 82
- December 5 – Hermann Anton Gelinek, organist and violinist, 70
- December 28 – Gennaro Manna, composer, 64
- December - Richard Morris, collector of folk songs, 76
- unknown date – Edward Jones, Welsh composer, 49/50
