= Heinrich Häser =

German medical author

- Born: 15 October 1811; Rome (Kingdom of Italy)
- Died: 13 September 1885; Wrocław (German Empire)
- Education: University of Jena
- Occupations: University teacher; medical doctor
- Father: August Ferdinand Häser
- Scientific career
- Workplaces: University of Jena (1836–1849); Leipzig University (1849–1849); University of Greifswald (1849–1862); University of Wrocław (1862–1885)

Heinrich Häser (15 October 1811 – 13 September 1885) was a German medical author.

== Biography ==
He was born in Rome, the son of the musician August Ferdinand Häser (1779–1844). He studied medicine at the University of Jena, taught there from 1836 to 1849 (associate professor from 1839, full professor from 1846). Afterwards he worked as a professor at the universities of Greifswald (from 1849) and Breslau (from 1862).

He was an editor of the periodicals Archiv für die gesammte Medicin (1840–49) and Repertorium für die gesammte Medicin (1840–42).

== Published works ==
He edited:

- Christian Gottfried Gruner, Scriptores de Sudore Anglico (1847).
- Bibliotheca Epidemiographica (2nd edition, 1862).
- Repertorium für die gesamte Medizin (“Medical reports”; 1840–42).
- Archiv für die gesamte Medizin (“Medical archives”; 1840–49).

He wrote:

- Historisch-pathologische Untersuchungen ("Historical-pathological investigations"; 1839–41).
- Lehrbuch der Geschichte der Medizin und der Volkskrankheiten (“A primer of the history of medicine and popular diseases”; 3rd edition, 1875–82).
- Geschichte der christlichen Krankenpflege und Pflegerschaften (“History of Christian care for the sick and care givers”; 1857).
- Die Vaccination und ihre Gegner (“Vaccination and its opponents”; 1854).
- Buch der Bündth-Ertznei (“Book of Bündth-Ertznei”; 1868) Digital edition by the University and State Library Düsseldorf
- Grundriss der Geschichte der Medizin (“Outline of the history of medicine”; 1884).
