= Op. 168 =

In music, Op. 168 stands for Opus number 168. Compositions that are assigned this number include:

- Saint-Saëns – Bassoon Sonata
- Schubert – String Quartet No. 8
