= Charlotte Häser =

German opera singer

Charlotte Häser (24 June 1784 – 1 May 1871) was a German soprano.

Born in Leipzig, Häser was the daughter of composer Johann Georg Häser, under whom she studied; employed for a time in Dresden, in 1806 she traveled to Italy, where she was greatly successful. She was among the first female singers to perform en travesti. Upon retirement she settled in Rome, in which city she died. She was the sister of August Ferdinand Häser.
