= Symphony No. 75 (Haydn) =

Symphony in four movements by Joseph Haydn

Joseph Haydn

The Symphony No. 75 in D major (Hoboken 1/75) is a symphony composed by Joseph Haydn between 1779 and 1781.

== Music ==
The symphony was originally scored for flute, two oboes, bassoon, two horns, and strings. Later, parts for two trumpets and timpani were added.

The work is in four movements:

1. Grave — Presto
2. Poco adagio (Andante con variazioni in many sources), 3/4
3. Menuetto & Trio: Allegretto, 3/4
4. Finale: Vivace, 2/2

The opening slow introduction is marked Grave. The first theme features a lyrical rising half-step motif followed by three loud chords. Mozart wrote down this theme along with the openings of symphonies 47 and 62, presumably, as Charles Rosen noted, "with an eye to conducting them at his concerts." The second theme is very brief and also contains a rising half-step. The second theme is omitted from the recapitulation.

The second movement is a theme in muted strings followed by four strophic variations. The second variation features a dialogue between wind & brass fanfares with simple string writing. The third features a solo string trio against a pizzicato accompaniment. Here, the solo cello plays continuously weaving sixteenth notes under the melody in the two other solo strings.

Haydn reported a curious story during his first visit to London:

On 26th March 1792 at Mr Barthelemon's Concert, there was an English clergyman who sank into the deepest melancholy on hearing my Andante [here Haydn cites the opening of the second movement of Symphony No. 75], because the night before he had dreamt that such an Andante was a premonition of his death. — He immediately left the company and took to his bed, and today, the 25th of April, I learnt from Herr Barthelemon that this Protestant clergyman had died.

Elaine Sisman has postulated that Wolfgang Amadeus Mozart modeled the slow movement of his Piano Concerto No. 15 on the second movement of this symphony.

The fourth movement is "a rounded binary form with repeats of both halves," sometimes mistaken for sonata form.
