= Joachim Nicolas Eggert =

Swedish composer (1779–1813)

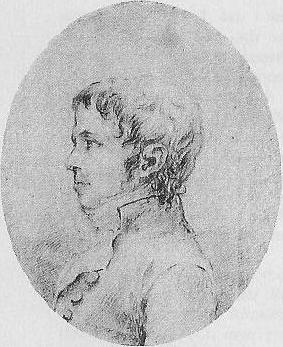
Joachim Nicolas Eggert

Joachim Nicolas Eggert (22 February 1779 – 14 April 1813) was a Swedish composer and musical director.

Eggert was born in Gingst on Rügen, at that time part of Swedish Pommern. At a very young age he started studying to play the violin. In Stralsund he continued his musical education in the subjects of violin and composition. These studies were followed, in the first years of the 19th century, by studies in musical theory in Braunschweig and Göttingen, with Johann Nikolaus Forkel as a teacher.

In 1802 he got his first appointment as a Kapellmeister at the court theater of Schwerin. A year later he became a violinist at the Royal Court Orchestra of Sweden. He soon received his first commissions for compositions. In 1807 he was appointed a member of the Royal Swedish Musical Academy; in the same year he made his debut as a musical director. Between 1808 and 1812, he worked as a Hofkapellmeister at the Royal Court Orchestra. He died at Thomestorp, Östergötland, Sweden, of tuberculosis at the age of 34.

The main part of his compositional creations are instrumental works like operas, cantatas, musical dramas, and symphonies. He also composed numerous works commissioned by the Swedish Court Orchestra. He introduced elements of Vienna Classicism into Swedish musical culture. In the course of his activities as Kapellmeister, he introduced for the first time works of Beethoven's in the Swedish concert repertoire. He also gained fame by directing the first Swedish performances of Haydn's oratorio The Seasons and Mozart's opera The Magic Flute.

Despite being the smallest-scored, Eggert's 3rd symphony was the only one of his to employ a trombone. In 1790, the Swedish Royal Court Orchestra hired 3 trombonists, and as a member of the orchestra, Eggert wrote his 3rd symphony for three trombones in all movements. On 14 May 1807, the 3rd symphony was performed with Eggert debuting as a musical director and conductor. This places it a year prior to the premiere of Beethoven's 5th (22 December 1808), this makes Eggert's 3rd symphony one of the earliest symphonies to include trombone throughout, with Ignaz Pleyel's three "London" symphonies performed around 1792.

== Selected works ==
=== Operas ===
- The Moors in Spain (1809)
- Svante Sture och Märta Leijonhufvud (1812)

=== Symphonies ===
- Symphony No. 1 in C major (1805)
- Symphony No. 2 in G minor "Skjöldebrand" (1806)
- Symphony No. 3 in E♭ major (1807)
- Symphony No. 4 in C minor "War and Peace" (1812)
- Symphony No. 5 in D minor (Unfinished)

=== Cantatas and ceremonial music. ===
- Funeral Music for Duke Frederik Adolf (1804)
- Cantata commemorating the peace between Sweden and Russia (1809)
- Cantata honouring the arrival of Prince Carl Johann Bernadotte to Stockholm (1810)
- Music for the Coronation of Carl XIII (1809)
- Cantata honouring the Chairman of the Stockholm Eric House. "Werdarnes evige konung" ("The world's eternal king").
- Cantata "Hwad stark gudomlig kraft" ("How mighty divine strength")
- Cantata "Ljud av salla Odens rost" ("Blessed Odin's voice")

=== Chamber works ===
- String quartets, Op. 1: No. 1 in G major, No. 2 in F minor (c. 1810), No. 3 in F major
- String quartets, Op. 2: No. 1 in B♭ major, No. 2 in G minor, No. 3 in D minor
- String quartets, Op. 3: No. 1 in C minor, No. 2 in G major, No. 3 in A major
- String quartets, WoO: in G major, in D minor, in A major (c. 1800), in D major (1810)
- Scherzo & Trio in G minor, for string quartet
- Fugue in D major, for string quartet
- String sextet in F minor (2 violins, 2 viola, cello and double-bass) (c. 1800–10)
- Sextet in F minor (clarinet, French horn, violin, viola, cello and double bass) (1807)
