= Johann Caspar Aiblinger =

German composer (1779–1867)

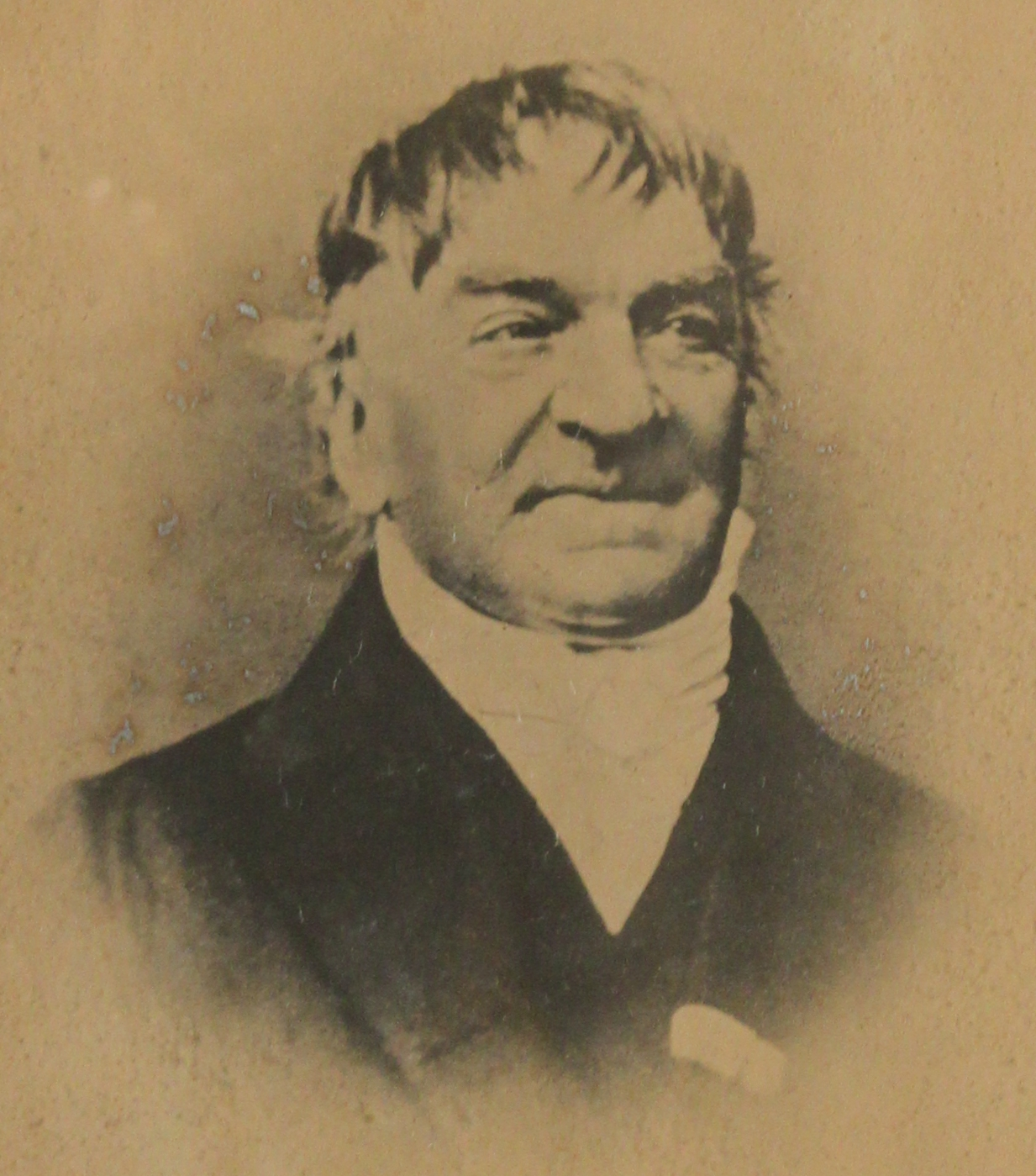
Johann Caspar Aiblinger, c. 1850

Johann Caspar Aiblinger (23 February 1779 – 6 May 1867) was a German composer associated with the Cecilian Movement.

== Biography ==
Aiblinger was born in Wasserburg am Inn, Bavaria. In his eleventh year, he commenced his studies at Tegernsee Abbey, where he was instructed in piano and organ-playing. Four years later, he entered the gymnasium at Munich, where he studied under Professor Schlett, his countryman.

In 1800 he began his studies at the University of Landshut. Inwardly drawn to the Catholic Church, he completed his study of philosophy and began that of theology, but the secularization of many religious orders in Bavaria prevented his entrance into a cloister. He now devoted himself solely to music. Led by the then prevailing idea that without a visit to Italy no musical education is complete, he turned his footsteps southward.

After a stay of eight years at Vicenza, where he fell under the influence of his countryman Johann Simon Mayr, Aiblinger (1811) went to Venice and there met Meyerbeer, who procured for him an appointment at the Conservatory. His failure to establish a school for classical music led him to Milan to assume the direction of the local ballet. On his return to Bavaria, King Maximilian I Joseph of Bavaria invited him to Munich to direct the Italian opera. King Ludwig I of Bavaria appointed him director of the royal orchestra, and sent him to Italy to collect old Italian masterpieces. On his return he became the organist at the Allerheiligen-Hofkirche, the church of All Saints, for which he wrote many compositions.

In 1864 he resigned from All Saints, on account of advancing years. He died in Munich.

== Works ==
In the 1820s, Aiblinger wrote two unsuccessful operas, before turning his energies to a crusade against the influence of Italian opera, which eventually led to a revival of Christoph Willibald Gluck's Iphigenia in Tauris, re-orchestrated by Aiblinger. Then he then turned to church music, studying the old masters and procuring performances of their works. His numerous church compositions comprise masses and requiems, offertories and graduals, psalms, litanies, and German hymns, many of which have been published at Augsburg, Munich, Regensburg, and Mainz.

- Masses
  - Messe in A major for soprano, alto, choir and organ
  - Weihnachtsmesse for solo, harp, organ, contrabass and violoncello
  - Missa Advocata nostra, also known under name Harfenmesse
- Pastorale in G major
- Bayerisches Militärgebet
- Rodrige und Chimäne
- Requiem in d minor
- Salve Regina in E major
