= Nikolaus von Krufft =

Austrian composer and civil servant

Nikolaus Freiherr von Krufft
- Born: 1 February 1779; Vienna
- Died: 16 April 1818 (aged 39); Vienna
- Occupations: Composer, civil servant

Nikolaus Freiherr von Krufft (1 February 1779 – 16 April 1818) was an Austrian composer and civil servant.

== Biography ==
He was the son of Andreas Adolph Freiherr von Krufft (1721-1793, civil servant) and his wife Maria Anna (née von Hahn). (Freiherr is a hereditary title, of similar status to the English baron.) He was educated at home, in training for government service. His mother was an excellent pianist, and a connoisseur and friend of classical music, and was his first music teacher. His sister Justina (1775-1832) was a talented poet and musician; his sister Catton was a poet also; his younger brother, Joseph, was a judge. From 1794 to 1800, Nikolaus studied philosophy and law at the University of Vienna. In 1801, he took employment at the Geheime Hof- und Staatskanzlei ('Secret Court and State Chancellery') (where his father also worked). In 1815, he was elevated to the rank of Staatskanzleirat ('State Counsel'). He was in close contact with Prince Metternich (1773-1859, Austrian diplomat), and was in his retinue when he visited Paris in 1815 to negotiate the Second Treaty of Paris after the final downfall of Napoleon. He accompanied the Prince during his visits to Italy in June 1817 and to Styria in October 1817. He was awarded medals by Alexander Tsar of Russia and Ferdinand King of Sicily, perhaps as part of the general enthusiasm for awarding decorations among the former allies which followed the fall of the First French Empire.

His great love was music. He started composing at an early age. He took lessons from Johann Georg Albrechtsberger (1736-1809, composer, organist, and music theorist) in counterpoint and composition. He devoted much of his leisure to musical studies and to composition. His first collection of songs was published in 1798, when he was nineteen. He was a co-founder of the Wiener Allgemeine musikalische Zeitung. The connoisseur Gassner judged that his works showed spirit, intellect, and taste. The Austrian-born French composer and publisher Pleyel (1757-1831) praised his 24 Preludes and Fugues as original, masterly in counterpoint, technically challenging, and distinguished among works of their kind. Krufft thought them his best work, and dedicated them to Archduke Rudolf (1788-1831, cardinal, patron of the arts, friend of Beethoven). Austrian musicologist Theophil Antonicek (1937-2014) thought that the piano works and lieder were the highlights of his output, with the 24 Preludes and Fugues looking back to Bach, and the lieder being important forerunners to Schubert.

His official cause of death was overwork, but it has been conjectured he might have been suffering from the ailment which claimed the life of Schubert (i.e., syphilis). By the end of his life, he found the sound of the piano unbearable.

== Compositions ==
His compositions include: (Note: Some of the entries in the BLKÖ citation are difficult to decipher. For example, the IMSLP link shows that the three works listed as Violinquartette are in fact for conventional string quartet. The forces for some of the choral works are unclear. A small number of obscurely-described works has been omitted from the list in the interests of accuracy.)

=== Piano works ===
- Seven piano sonatas; Op. 4 in D minor, in four movements (Vienna 1803), was dedicated to Beethoven
- Twenty-four preludes and fugues for piano in the twelve major and minor keys (Pleyel, Paris 1814)
- Three grand caprices for piano
- Twelve exercises in the form of Scottish dances
- Forty German dances
- Eighteen Scottish dances
- Grand sonata for piano four hands
- March for piano four hands

=== Vocal works ===
- Ninety-two lieder, some for soprano, some for bass, with piano accompaniment. These include settings of: "An Emma" (Schiller), "Bei einer Rose" (Johann Paul Köffinger), "Der Abend" (Schiller), "Der arme Thoms" (Johannes Daniel Falk), "Des Mädchens Klage" (Schiller), "Die Elfenkönigin" (Friedrich von Matthisson), "Die Erwartung" (Schiller), "Fleiss hinab, mein stilles Leben" (August Lafontaine), "Kennst du das Land?" (Goethe), "Lebenslied" (Matthisson), "Serenade" (Christian Ludwig von Reissig) and "Wehmut" (Reissig)
- Twenty-four songs for four male voices
- "Die Trösterin" for four voices
- Works for chorus: "An die Freude" (Schiller), "Reiterlied" from Schiller's Wallenstein, "Trinklied vor der Schlacht" (Theodor Körner)
- Three hymns: "Gottes Allmacht und Güte" (four voices and piano), "Gott meine Zuflucht" (four voices and piano), "Lob Gottes im Frühling" (six voices and piano)
- "Der Wanderer", for four voices and piano

=== Chamber music ===
- Two sonatas for bassoon and piano, in F (1807) and in B-flat (Op. 34, 1818)
- A Sonata for natural horn and piano, in E (some editions transposed into F)
- Variations for piano with cello or natural horn obbligato on a cavatina from the opera Der Augenarzt by Adalbert Gyrowetz
- Andante for three flutes
- Three string quartets
- Three marches for wind instruments

=== Other ===
- Fantasy and polonaise for piano and orchestra
