= Franz Paul Rigler =

Austrian piano virtuoso, composer, teacher and theorist

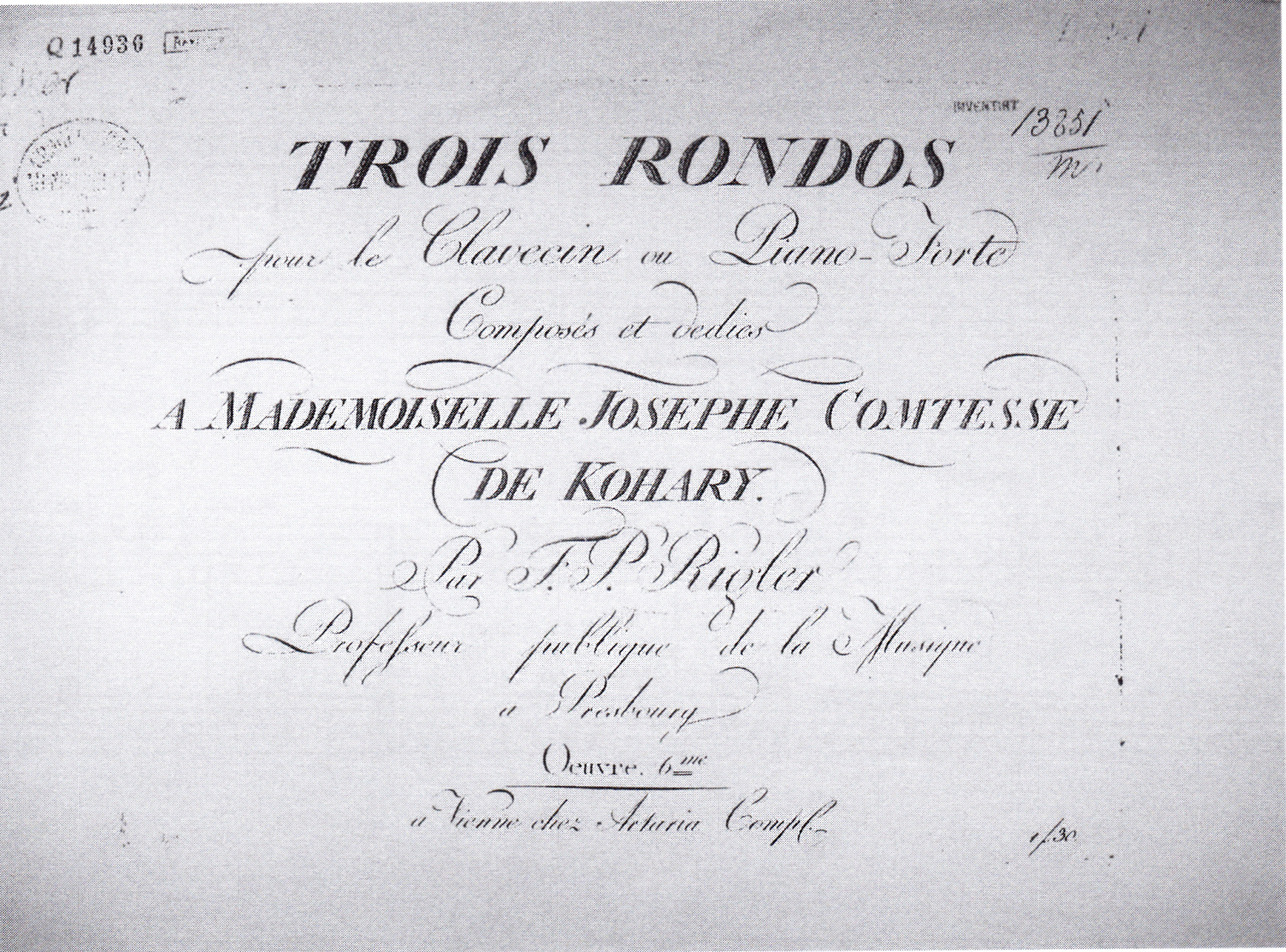
Title-page of Franz Paul Rigler's Three Rondos (1790) - the only known extant copy of the original edition

Franz Xaver Paul Rigler (Riegler) (1747/1748 – 17 October 1796) was an Austrian piano virtuoso, composer, teacher and theorist.

Rigler was probably born in Vienna, Austria. In the period from around 1775 to 1791, he was the music professor at the Royal National School in Pressburg (now Bratislava). His students there included Johan Nepomuk Hummel. Until interrupting his performances on keyboard in about 1785, he was regarded as one of the best keyboard players of his time.

His piano compositions and songs were published in Vienna and Bratislava. They include his Op. 6, theTrois Rondos pour le clavecin ou Piano-Forte (Three Rondos for the harpsichord or piano), published in Vienna in 1790, of which only a single copy of the edition is extant, in the archives of the Gesellschaft der Musikfreunde in Vienna.

Among his literary works, the most important one is the Anleitung zum Gesange, und dem Klaviere (1779), which covers practically all areas of music. This was in fact the first Viennese publication on playing keyboard instruments. His writings are influenced by late 18th-century Viennese tendencies in music and they also present information on the Viennese, Slovak and Hungarian music culture relationships.

Rigler died in Vienna on 17 October 1796.
