= Johann Ludwig Böhner =

German composer

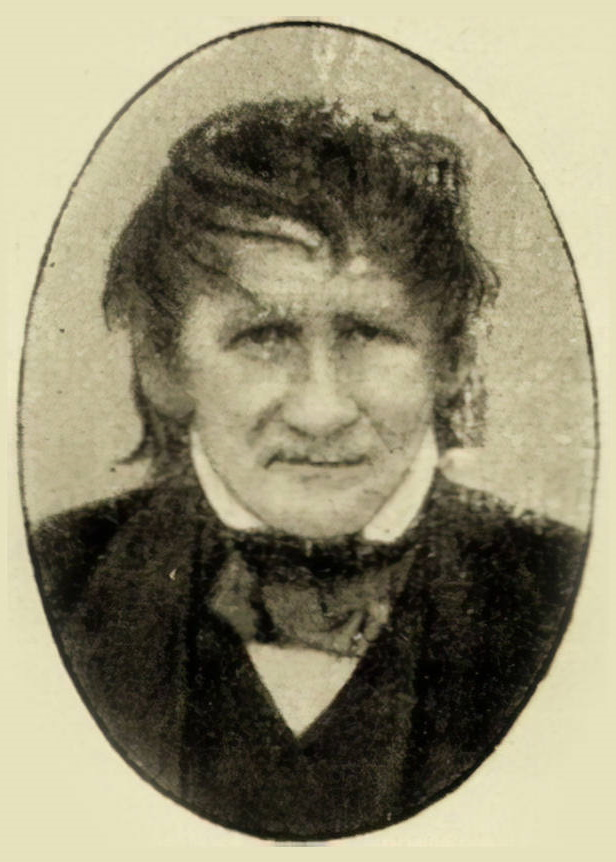
- Johann Ludwig Böhner, c. 1820
- Born: 7 January 1787; Töttelstädt, Erfurt, Germany
- Died: 28 March 1860 (aged 73); Gotha, Germany
- Occupations: Composer, Pianist, Organist

Johann Ludwig Böhner (7 January 1787 - 28 March 1860) was a German composer, pianist, and organist. He was known as the "Thuringian Mozart" by his contemporaries.

== Life ==
Böhner was born in Töttelstädt, Thuringia, near Erfurt. After his musical exposure and training by his father, Johann Matthias Böhner (a cantor and organist), Johann Christian Kittel, and Michael Gotthard Fischer, he worked as a piano teacher in Gotha, where he met Ludwig Spohr, until attaining the position of music director in Nuremberg in 1811. During his years at Nuremberg (1811-1814), many of his more well-known works were composed, including his Fantasies for Bassoon and Orchestra and Clarinet and Orchestra, and his romantic opera Die Mädchen in einsamen Mühlenthale.

As a pianist, Böhner scored his first success in Leipzig's Gewandhaus on 16 May 1814. From 1815 onwards, he toured through Germany, Austria, Denmark, and Switzerland. However, Böhner's successful piano career was soon to be compromised by increasing eccentricity, fraud, and ill health. Because of his character flaws, he had a mental breakdown in Hamburg in 1819 and stayed mostly in Gotha for the rest of his life.

At a performance in Leipzig in September 1834, composer Robert Schumann, in attendance, mentioned that he "looked so poverty-stricken as quite to depress me. He was like an old lion with a thorn in his foot." Schumann uttered a half-intention to write a Böhneriana suite based on the old composer's personality. This was afterwards to be the basis of his suite Kreisleriana, Op. 16, in 1838.

He composed very few works during his later years, including his Symphony in D minor (1844), and a rework of Die Mädchen in einsamen Mühlenthale as a comic opera, Der Dreiherrenstein (1848). His last appearance as a pianist was in Arnstadt in August 1859. He died in Gotha, very deep in poverty. The Gothaische Zeitung noted on March 29, 1860, a day after his death:

"Last night, the composer Ludwig Böhner, once celebrated in the widest circles, passed away at an advanced but unfortunately joyless age after a varied life."

== Selected Works ==
Böhner composed various works, including operas, chamber works, and orchestra and soloist works. Some of his more famous works include:

- Fantasy for Bassoon and Orchestra, Op. 1
- Ten Variations on a Tyrolian Air, Op. 6
- Piano Concerto No. 1, Op. 7
- Serenade in F major for orchestra, Op. 9
- Piano Concerto No. 4, Op. 13
- Piano Concerto No. 5, Op. 14
- Grand Overture for Orchestra, Op. 16
- Variations for Horn and String Quartet, Op. 24
- Introduction and Variations for Bassoon and Orchestra, Op. 27
- Overture to the opera The Three Lords' Stone
- Six Bagatelles for Piano, Op. 92
- Fantasy and Variations on an Original Theme for Violin and Orchestra in E minor, Op. 94
- Symphony No. 1 in D minor, Op. 130

Böhner also composed two operas, which, along with most of his other compositions, are rarely performed today. Those operas were:

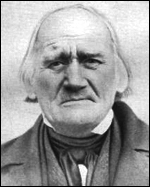
Böhner, c. 1850

- Die Mädchen in einsamen Mühlenthale (1810-1813)
- Der Dreiherrenstein (1848), a comic opera rework of Die Mädchen in einsamen Mühlenthale

== Sources ==
George Grove (1880). "Böhner, Johann". Grove Music Online (8th ed.). Oxford University Press. doi:10.1093/gmo/9781561592630.article.15081. ISBN 978-1-56159-263-0. (subscription, Wikilibrary access, or UK public library membership required) (subscription required)
