= Quartettsatz, D 103 (Schubert) =

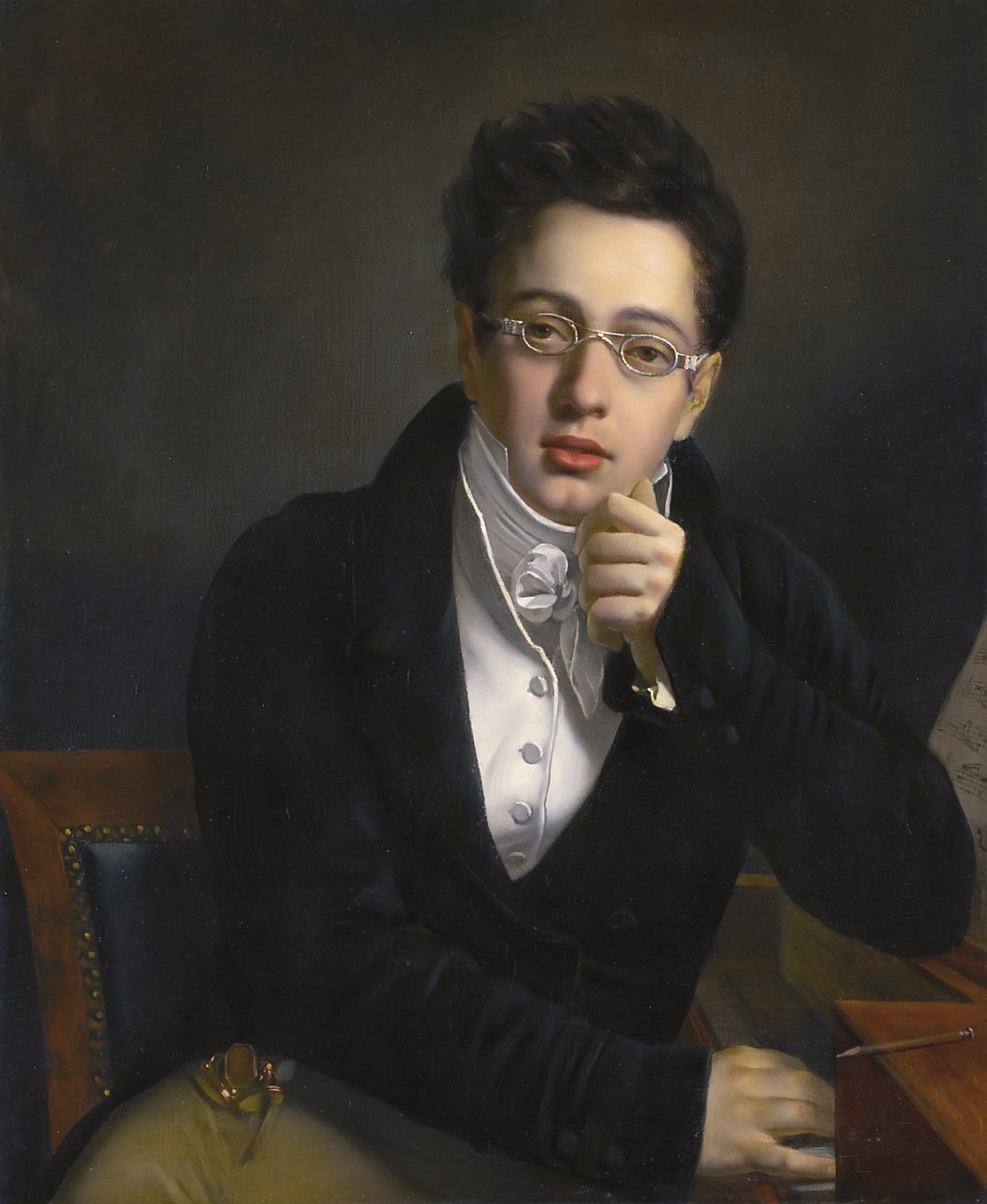
Possible portrait of the young Franz Schubert c. 1814, attributed to Josef Abel

The Quartettsatz in c-Moll (English: Quartet Movement in C minor), D. 103 was composed by Franz Schubert in 1814. It is believed to be the only surviving movement of a complete quartet in C minor. The composition as completed for performance consists of a single movement marked Grave – Allegro and lasts around 8 minutes.

== Background ==
The movement is believed to be one of several quartets sold to Anton Diabelli by Ferdinand Schubert following his brother's death in 1828. Remaining unpublished, the surviving manuscript comprising an incomplete movement that ends at the recapitulation came into the possession of the Gesellschaft der Musikfreunde during the latter half of the 19th century. Musicologist Alfred Orel prepared a performing version that was published in 1939.
