= Stage works by Franz Schubert =

Franz Schubert's best-known music for the theatre is his incidental music for Rosamunde. Less successful were his many opera and Singspiel projects. On the other hand, some of his most popular Lieder, like "Gretchen am Spinnrade," were based on texts written for the theatre.

== Incidental music and overtures for the theatre ==
=== Overture for Der Teufel als Hydraulicus ===
D. 4, Overture to the vocal comedy Der Teufel als Hydraulicus for orchestra (1812?)

=== Die Zauberharfe ===
D. 644, Music for the Zauberspiel Die Zauberharfe (The Magic Harp) for tenor, six spoken roles, mixed choir and orchestra (1820, in three acts: overtures to the first and third acts, and thirteen numbers; overture to the first act known as the "Rosamunde" Overture, also used in D. 797)

Act 1

Overture
1. Chor der Troubadours: Harfentöne laßt erklingen
2. Chor der Troubadours und Ritter: Zum Saal, der goldne Becher blinkt
3. Melodram
4. Finale I: Ida gib ein Zeichen

Act 2

5. Chor der Troubadours und Ritter: Leben laßt den goldnen Wein
6. Melodram: Furie bebe!
7. Chor der Ritter: Die Zauberin laßt uns betrügen (2 versions, 1st version is a sketch)
8. Melodram: Da zieh'n sie hin in heller Mondennacht
9. Finale II. Romanze des Palmerin: Was belebt die schöne Welt? (2 versions, 1st version is a sketch; NSA also appends an alternative, concert version); Chor der Genien: Schlafe, Liebliche

Act 3

Ouverture to act 3
10. Melodram: Geschlossen ist der Bund
11. Melodram hinter den Kulißen
12. Melodram: Wohlan! Euer Verlangen werde erfüllt!
13. Finale III. Schlußgesang: Durch der Töne Zaubermacht

=== Rosamunde ===
D. 797, Music for Schauspiel Rosamunde, Fürstin von Zypern for alto, mixed choir and orchestra (1823, overture and nine numbers; first published as Op. 26)

Overture (from D. 644)
1. Entr'acte after scene 1 (possibly the fourth movement of the Symphony (No. 8) in B minor, D. 759)
2. Ballet Music No. 1
3a. Entr'acte after scene 2
3b. Romanze: "Der Vollmond strahlt auf Bergeshöh'n"
4. Geisterchor: "In der Tiefe wohnt das Licht"
5. Entr'acte after scene 3
6. Shepherds' Melodies
7. Shepherds' Chorus: "Hier auf den Fluren"
8. Hunters' Chorus: "Wie lebt sich's so fröhlich im Grünen"
9. Ballet Music No. 2

== German-language operas and Singspiele ==
=== Der Spiegelritter ===
D. 11, Singspiel Der Spiegelritter for five sopranos, three tenors, four basses, mixed choir and orchestra (1811?, in three acts?; unfinished – overture, five complete numbers and three fragments from act 1 are extant)

Act 1

Overture
1. Introduktion: Heil Euch, Herr Ritter
2. Ensemble: Wohlan, laßt die rüstigen Gesellen (fragment)
3. Arie: Der Sonne Strahl ist warm (fragment; part of this number was formerly D. 966)
4. Quintett: Wir gratullren
5. Arie and Terzett: Ach! es ist schön fremde Länder zu selin
6. Ensemble: Ein Sinnbild auf dem blanken Schild
7. Arie: Halte graues Haar in Ehren
8. Ensemble: So nimm, du junger Held, den silbernen Spiegel im blauen Feld (fragment of a piano sketch)

=== Des Teufels Lustschloß ===
D. 84, Singspiel Des Teufels Lustschloß for three sopranos, two tenors, three basses, one spoken role, mixed choir and orchestra (1814, in three acts: overture and twenty-three numbers; 2 versions; NSA also appends three discarded numbers: No. 13 from the 1st version and Nos. 7 and 23 from the 2nd version, in addition to a fragment of an orchestral postlude)

Act 1

Overture
1. Introduktion: Hülfe, Hülf'! Hier ist Gefahr
2. Lied: Was kümmert mich ein sumpfig Land
3. Duett: Ja morgen, wenn die Sonne sinkt
4. Arie: Wohin zwei Liebende sich retten
5. Quartett: Kaum hundert Schritt' von dieser Schänke
6. Terzett: Fort will ich, fort!
7. Arie: Welcher Frevel!
8. Arie: Gesundheit ist mit Muth verschwistert
9. Duett: Herr Ritter, zu Hülfe
10. Trauermusik
11. Finale I: Ach! Nun ist der Teufel los!

Act 2 (this entire act is missing in the 2nd version)

12a. Rezitativ: Ich lebe noch
12b. Rezitativ und Duett: Vergebens schweif'ich
13. Arie: Nie bebte vor dem nahen Tode
14a. Melodram
14b. Marsch
15a. Frauenchor: Hast du vergessen
15b. Ensemble: Noch einmal hat das Zauberspiel
16a. Trauermarsch
16b. Ensemble: Ihr wollet mich zum Tode führen
17. Finale II: Die Schöne, die dich hergesandt

Act 3

18. Szene und Aria: Ihr unsichtbaren Geister
19. Duett: O wär' ich fern
20. Ensemble: Ha, die Mörder meines Gatten
21. Duett: Hab' ich dich wieder!
22. Terzett: Ich lach', ich wein'
23. Finale III: Heil dem mächt'gen Triebe!

=== Adrast ===
D. 137, Singspiel Adrast for soprano, tenor, bass, men's choir and orchestra (1817, in two or three acts?; unfinished – thirteen numbers are extant: eight are complete, and five are sketches)

1. Introduktion: Dank dir Göttin
2. Rezitativ und Arie: Ein schlafend Kind
3. Rezitativ und Arie: War einer je der Sterblichen beglückt
4. Chor mit Solo: Dem König Heil
5. Arie: Meine Seele, die dich liebt
6. Instrumentalsatz
7. Duett: Erheitre dich
8. Szene: Wie liegst du starr und bleich
9. Rezitativ und Duett: Aus den Mermnaden (sketch)
10. Chor: Aus den Fluthen (sketch)
11. Rezitativ: Die Lyder sind (sketch)
12. Arie: [...] Warum ließ ich mit dem Verruchten dich auf die Jagd? (two fragments of sketches)
13. Chor: "?" (sketch)

=== Der vierjährige Posten ===
D. 190, Singspiel Der vierjährige Posten for soprano, three tenors, bass, one spoken role, mixed choir and orchestra (1815, in one act: overture and eight numbers)

Overture
1. Introduktion: Heiter strahlt der neue Morgen
2. Duett: Du guter Heinrich! Ach, was wir beide doch glücklich sind!
3. Terzett: Mag dich die Hoffnung nicht betrügen!
4. Quartett: Freund, eilet euch zu retten!
5. Arie: Gott! Gott! höre meine Stimme (a version for voice and piano is also extant)
6. Marsch und Soldatenchor: Lustig in den Kampf
7. Ensemble: Um Gotteswillen, er ist verloren!
8. Finale: Schöne Stunde, die uns blendet

=== Fernando ===
D. 220, Singspiel Fernando for two sopranos, tenor, two basses, one spoken role and orchestra (1815, in one act: seven numbers)

1. Introduktion: Mutter! Mutter! Wo bist du?
2. Arie: Läßt mich mein Verbrechen nicht schlafen?
3. Romanze: Als einst schon hinter blauer Berge Rücken
4. Duett: Wärst du mir auf immer nicht entrißen
5. Arie: Nicht der Erde Schätze lohnen
6. Duett: Vergessen sei, was uns getrennt
7. Finale: Auf dich träufle Thauesregen

=== Claudine von Villa Bella ===
D. 239, Singspiel Claudine von Villa Bella for two sopranos, two tenors, two basses, mixed choir and orchestra (1815, in three acts; incomplete – act 1: overture and eight numbers, is extant, as well as one number from act 2 and one number from act 3; remaining numbers were written, but are now lost)

Act 1

Overture
1. Introduktion: Das hast du wohl bereitet
2. Ensemble: Fröhlicher, seliger, herrlicher Tag
3. Ariette: Hin und wieder fliegen die Pfeile
4. Arie: Alle Freuden, alle Gaben, die mir heut' gehuldigt haben
5. Arie: Es erhebt sich eine Stimme
6. Ariette: Liebe schwärmt auf allen Wegen
7. Räuberlied: Mit Mädchen sich vertragen
8. Finale I: Deinem Willen nachzugeben

Act 2

9. Ariette: Liebliches Kind, kannst du mir sagen

Act 3

10. Duett: Mich unfangt ein banger Schauer

=== Die Freunde von Salamanka ===
D. 326, Singspiel Die Freunde von Salamanka for three sopranos, three tenors, six basses, mixed choir and orchestra (1815, in two acts: overture and eighteen numbers)

Act 1

Overture
1. Introduktion: Die Sonne zieht in goldnen Strahlen
2. Arie: Man ist so glücklich und so frei
3. Quartett: Morgen, wenn des Hahnes Ruf erschallt
4. Arie: Einsam schleich' ich durch die Zimmer
5. Terzett: Lebensmut und frische Kühlung weht mir aus dem trauten Wald
6. Terzett: Freund, wie wird die Sache enden
7. Finale I: Mild senkt sich der Abend nieder

Act 2

8. Introduktion: Laßt nur alles leichtfertige Wesen
9. Lied: Guerillas zieht durch Feld und Wald
10. Arie: Aus Blumen deuten die Damen gern
11. Duett: Ein wackres Thier, das müßt ihr sagen
12. Duett: Gelagert unter'm hellen Dach der Bäume
13. Arie: Wo ich weile, wo ich gehe
14. Duett: Von tausend Schlangenbissen
15. Romanze: Es murmeln die Quellen
16. Terzett: Nichte, Don Diego da, wirbt um deine freie Hand
17. Arie: Traurig geht der Geliebte von dannen
18. Finale II: Gnäd'ge Frau, ich hab' die Ehre

=== Die Bürgschaft ===
Die Bürgschaft, D. 435, is an opera for four sopranos, three tenors, three basses, two baritones, mixed choir and orchestra (1816, in three acts; unfinished – act 1: nine numbers, five numbers from act 2, and one number and one fragment from act 3 are extant)

Act 1

1. Chor: Hilfe! Rettung
2. Arie: Muss ich fühlen in tiefer Brust
3. Chor: Wir dürstet der Aetna
4. Arie: Es lebe, es lebe der meutrische Thor
5. Arie: Diese Gnade dank' ich dir
6. Arie: Ob er wohl wiederkehrt?
7. Romanze: Die Mutter sucht ihr liebes Kind
8. Duett: Wir bringen dir die Kette
9. Finale I: Du gehst in Kerker, Du?

Act 2

10. Entr'acte and aria: O Götter! O Dank Euch
11. Arie: Welche Nacht hab'ich erlebt
12. Ensemble: Horch die Seufzer unerer Mutter
13. Quartett: Hinter Büschen, hinterm Laub, Räuberlied
14. Szene und Arie: O göttliche Ruhe

Act 3

15. Entr'acte
16. Ensemble: Der Abend rückt heran (fragment)

=== Die Zwillingsbrüder ===
D. 647, Singspiel Die Zwillingsbrüder for soprano, tenor, three basses, mixed choir and orchestra (1819, in one act: overture and ten numbers)

Overture
1. Introduktion: Verglühet sind die Sterne
2. Duett: Vor dem Busen möge blühen
3. Arie: Der Vater mag wohl immer
4. Arie: Mag es stürmen, donnern
5. Quartett: Zu rechter Zeit bin ich gekommen
6. Arie: Liebe, theure Muttererde
7. Duett: Nur dir will ich gehören
8. Terzett: Wagen Sie Ihr Wort zu brechen
9. Quintett und Chor: Packt ihn, führt ihn vor Gericht
10. Schlußchor: Die Brüder haben sich gefunden

=== Sakuntala ===
D. 701, Opera Sakuntala for fourteen sopranos, three altos, five tenors, nine basses, mixed choir and orchestra (1820, also appears as "Sakontala" or "Sacontala"; in three acts; unfinished – sketches of eleven numbers from acts 1 and 2 are extant)

Act 1

1. Introduktion: Das holde Licht des Tages (sketch)
2. Arie: Du hoffest im Arme des Gatten (sketch)
3. Quintett: Hier liegen wir im Staub gebeuget (sketch)
4. Arie: Wie fühl' ich, ihr Götter (sketch)
5. Chor der Waldnymphen: Wo du wandelst (sketch)
6. Arie: Noch schläft die goldne Sonne (sketch)
7. Finale I: Sieg deinen Fahnen, König (sketch)

Act 2

8a. Terzett: Komm nur Dieb (sketch)
8b. Terzett: So liebes Brüderchen (sketch)
9. Quartett: Rosenzeit der Freuden (sketch)
10. Septett: Mit liebendem Verlangen (sketch)
11. Arie: Trauet auf Götter (sketch)

=== Duet and Aria for Das Zauberglöckchen ===
D. 723, Duet and Aria for Hérold's Das Zauberglöckchen ['Nein, nein, nein, nein, das ist zu viel'; 'Der Tag entflieht, der Abend glüht'] for two tenors, bass and orchestra (1821)

=== Alfonso und Estrella ===
D. 732, Opera Alfonso und Estrella for two sopranos, two tenors, bass, two baritones, mixed choir and orchestra (1821–1822, in three acts: overture and thirty-four numbers)

Act 1

Overture
1. Introduktion: Still, noch decket und sie Nacht
2. Arie: Sei mir gergrüßt, o Sonne
3. Chor und Ensemble: Versammelt euch, Bruder
4. Duett: Geschmückt von Glanz und Siegen
5. Rezitativ und Arie: Es ist dein streng Gebot
6. Rezitativ und Duett: Du rührst mich Theurer
7. Chor und Arie: Zur Jagd, zur Jagd!
8. Rezitativ und Arie: Verweile, o Prinzeßin (a version for voice and piano is also extant)
9. Duett: Ja gib, vernimm mein Flehen
10. Finale I: Glänzende Waffe den Krieger erfreut

Act 2

11. Rezitativ und arie: O sing' mir Vater [formerly D. 683]
12. Rezitativ und Duett: Wie rühret mich dein herrlicher Gesang
13. Rezitativ und Arie: Wer bist du, holdes Wesen (a version for voice and piano is also extant)
14. Duett: Freundlich bist du mir erschienen
15. Arie: Könnt' ich ewig hier verweilen
16. Duett: Laß dir als Erinnerungszeichen
17. Chor und Ensemble: Stille, Freunde, seht euch vor
18. Chor und Arie: Wo ist sie, was kommt ihr zu künden?
19. Ensemble: Die Prinzeßin ist erschienen
20. Duett und Chor: Darf Dich dein Kind umarmen?
21. Arie: Herrlich auf des Berges Höhen
22. Finale II: Sag', wo ist er hingekommen

Act 3

23. Introduktion
24. Duett: Hörst du rufen?
25. Duett: Du wirst mir nicht entrinnen
26. Terzett und Chor: Welche Stimme
27. Duett: Doch nun werde deinem Retter
28. Rezitativ und Duett: Ja ich, ich bin gerettet
29. Duett mit Chor: Wehe, wehe! Meines Vaters Schaaren seh' ich
30. Ensemble: Sie haben das Rufen vernommen
31. Rezitativ und Ensemble: Was geht hier vor
32. Arie: Wo find ich nur den Ort
33. Duett: Kein Geist, ich bin am Leben
34. Terzett: Empfange nun aus meiner Hand; Finale III: Was hör' ich, welche Klänge

=== Die Verschworenen ===
D. 787, Singspiel Die Verschworenen for four or five sopranos, two altos, two or three tenors, two basses, mixed choir and orchestra, Der häusliche Krieg (1823, in one act: eleven numbers)

Overture (fragment)
1. Duett: Sie ist's! Er ist's! (2 versions; 1st version for soprano, tenor and orchestra; 2nd version for two sopranos and orchestra)
2. Romanze: Ich schleiche bang' und still herurn
3. Ensemble: Ihr habt auf Eure Burg entboten
4. Verschwörungschor: Ja, wir schwören
5. Marsch und Chor: Vorüber ist die Zeit
6. Ensemble: Verrätherei hab' ich entdeckt
7. Chor der Ritter und Frauen: Willkommen, schön willkommen
8. Duett: Ich muß sie finden
9. Ariette: Ich habe gewagt und habe gestritten
10. Ariette: Gesetzt, ihr habt wirklich gewagt
11. Finale: Wie? Darf ich meinen Augen traun?; Ensemble: Ich bin beschämt

=== Rüdiger ===
D. 791, Opera Rüdiger for two tenors, men's choir and orchestra (1823, sketches of two numbers are extant)

1. Introduktion: Durch der Ostsee wilde Wogen (sketch)
2. Duett: Ja, sie war's, der Frauen Krone (sketch)

=== Fierabras ===
D. 796, Opera Fierabras for three sopranos, three tenors, three basses, baritone, one spoken role, mixed choir and orchestra (1823, also appears as "Fierrabras"; in three acts: overture and twenty-three numbers; first published as Op. 76)

Act 1

Overture
1. Introduktion: Der Runde Silberfaden
2. Duett: O mög' auf froher Hoffnung Schwingen
3. Marsch und Chor: Zu hohen Ruhmespforten
4. Ensemble

a. Rezitativ und Chor: Die Beute laß, o Herr
b. Ensemble: Des Krieges Loos hat Euch
c. Erzählung: Am Rand der Eb'ne
d. Ensemble: Der Landestöcher fromme Pflichteu
e. Quartett mit Chor: Dem Erfolg vertrauen

5. Duett: Laß uns mutvoll hoffen
6. Finale I

a. Romanze: Der Abend sinkt auf stiller Flur
b. Rezitativ und Arie: Was quälst du mich, o Mißgeschick
c. Ensemble: Doch horch, was regt sich
d. Terzett: Ha, hier waltet ein Verrath
e. Rezitativ: Nun faßet Muth
f. Rezitativ und Terzett: Wie? Emma hier?
g. Quartett mit Chor: Fort zum Siegesreigen

Act 2

7. Lied mit Chor: Im jungen Morgenstrahle
8. Rezitativ, March und Ensemble: Beschloßen ist's, ich löse seine Ketten!; Duett mit Chor: Was ist ihm geschehen?
9. Duett: Weit über Glanz und Erdenschimmer
10. Quintett: Verderben denn und Fluch
11. Chor: Laßt Friede in die Hallen
12. Terzett mit Chor: Im Tode sollt ihr büßen
13. Arie: Die Brust, gebeugt von Sorgen
14. Chor a capella: O theures Vaterland!
15. Melodram

a. Melodram. Rezitativ und Ensemble: Ha, was ist das?
b. Duett mit Chor: Selbst an des Grabes Rande

16. Chor und Melodram: Der Hoffnung Strahl, den du gegeben
17. Finale II

a. Terzett und Chor: Uns führt der Vorsicht weise Hand
b. Melodram: Schützt ihn, ihr ew'gen Mächte

Act 3

18. Chor: Bald tönet der Reigen
19. Quartett: Bald wird es klar
20. Terzett: Wenn hoch im Wolkensitze
21. Arie mit Chor: Der Jammers herbe Qualen; Marcia funebre und Ensemble (the latter part of this number, "Laß dein Vertrauen nicht schwinden" was formerly D. 333)
22. Chor und Ensemble: Der Rache Opfer fallen
23. Finale III

a. Rezitativ: Er ist mein Vater
b. Ensemble: Der Sieg begleitet meine tapfern Heere
c. Nun laßt des langersehnten Glücks uns freuen

=== Der Graf von Gleichen ===
D. 918, Opera Der Graf von Gleichen for four sopranos, two tenors, six basses, mixed choir and orchestra (1827, in two acts; unfinished – sketches of eleven numbers for act 1 and nine numbers for act 2 are extant)

Act 1

1. Introduktion: Es funkelt der Morgen (sketch)
2. Rezitativ und Cavatine: O Himmel kannst du mir; Mein Weib, o Gott (sketch)
3. Terzett: Wart nur wart (sketch)
4. Duett: Ein Schiff? ein Schiff? (sketch)
5a. Arie: Ihr Blumen, ihr Bäume (sketch)
5b. Rezitativ und Duettritornell: Suleika! Mein Herr und Freund! (sketch)
5c. Duett: Ich wünscht um dich zu schmücken (sketch)
6. Marsch, Rezitativ, Arie und Chor: Ha! Was ist das? (sketch)
7. Quintett: Wie Mondlicht durch die Wolken glänzt (sketch)
8. Rezitativ und Arie: Himmel was mußt' ich hören?; Ja ich lieb' ihn (sketch)
9. Lied: Tausend Frauen konnt' ich schauen (sketch)
10. Duett: Ob ich verstehe? (sketch)
11. Finale I: Sie wird kommen (sketch)

Act 2

12. Chor: Laßt uns nicht feyern (sketch)
13. Arie: Trocknet nicht Thränen der ewigen Liebe (sketch)
14. Chor: Vaterland nimm uns auf in deinen Arm (sketch)
15. Rezitativ und Arie: Burg meiner Väter; O Vater der Güte (sketch)
16a. Rezitativ und Duett mit Chor: Wo ist er?; Laß ab mir sprengts die Brust (sketch)
16b. Rezitativ und Chor: Doch sprich, wo ist mein süßer Knabe? (sketch)
17a. Terzett: Das Zeichen wars, das er versprach (sketch)
17b. Rezitativ und Quintett: Oh sieh, sie kommt; Meine Arme öffnen sich (sketch)
18. Lied mit Chor: Vor Allem müßt ihr wissen (sketch)
19. Quartett: Gratulire! nun ich habe nichts dagegen (sketch)
20a. Rezitativ und Arie: Sie schläft; Deine Liebe, deine Milde (sketch)
20b. Duett: Wohlan! Sprich zu dem frommen Kinde (sketch)
20c. Arie: Gütter Gott nimm aus dem Herzen (sketch)
20d. Rezitativ und Duett: Angelika!; Schlage nicht die Augen nieder (sketch)
20e. Terzett: Ihr seyd bewegt was ist geschehen? (sketch)
20f. Quintett: Es geht schön im Kreise der volle Pokal (sketch)

=== Der Minnesänger ===
D. 981, Singspiel Der Minnesänger (date unknown, fragment; lost)

=== Sophie (?) ===
D. 982, Opera "?" for two sopranos, tenor, bass and orchestra (1819–1821?, also appears as "Sophie"; title and text author unknown; sketches of three numbers are extant)

1. Quartett: O lang ersehnte Seligkeit (sketch)
2. Ariette: Philomele, Philomele (sketch)
3. Terzett: Wir giessen die Nelken (sketch)

== Settings of German plays ==
=== Plays by Goethe ===
- From Goethe's Faust:
  - "Gretchen am Spinnrade", D 118
  - "Scene from Faust" (Szene aus Faust), D 126: in 1814 Schubert set "Wie anders, Gretchen, war dir's" as a Lied for voice and piano (two versions) and as a Duet for voices and piano, also possible as a Cantata for voice, choir and piano or as a Cantata for two voices, choir and piano (two versions).
  - "Der König in Thule", D 367, Op. 5, No. 5
  - "Chor der Engel", D 440
  - "Gretchen im Zwinger", D 564

=== Plays by Schiller ===
- "Des Mädchens Klage" from Friedrich Schiller's Wallenstein
- "Amalia" from Die Räuber

=== Plays by Christian Wilhelm von Schütz ===
- Op. posth. 124 – D. 857, Two songs Zwei Szenen aus dem Schauspiel "Lacrimas" (Two scenes from the play "Lacrimas" by Christian Wilhelm von Schütz) for voice and piano (1825):

1. "Lied der Delphine" ['Ach, was soll ich beginnen vor Liebe?']
2. "Lied des Florio" ['Nun, da Schatten niedergleiten']

== Settings of Italian libretti ==
=== Libretti by Metastasio ===
When a student of Salieri, Schubert set several excerpts of Italian libretti by Metastasio.

D	pub.	AGA	NSA	Name	Incipit	Date	Remarks
17	(1940) (1986)		VIII, 2 No. 37	Composition exercises, D 17	Quell' innocente figlio	1812?	From Isacco I, "Aria dell' Angelo" – Nine settings, corrections by Salieri
33	(1940)		VIII, 2 No. 38	Composition exercises, D 33	Entra l'uomo allor che nasce	Sept–Oct 1812	From Isacco II, "Aria di Abramo" – Six settings and an Allegretto, corrections by Salieri
34	(1940)		VIII, 2 No. 39	Composition exercises, D 34	Te solo adoro	5/11/1812	From Betulia liberata II, "Aria di Achior" – Two settings (second incomplete), corrections by Salieri
35	(1940)		VIII, 2 No. 40	Composition exercises, D 35	Serbate, o Dei custodi	Oct–Dec 1812	From La clemenza di Tito I, 5 – Three settings, corrections by Salieri
42	(1895) (1969)	XX, 10; No. 570	IV, 6 No. 5 Anh. No. 3	Aria di Timante	Misero pargoletto	1813?	From Demofoonte III, 5 – Two settings; first setting two variant fragments
76	(1871) (1969)	XX, 10; No. 571	IV, 6 No. 9 Anh. No. 4	Aria di Fronimo	Pensa, che questo istante	13 and 7 Sept. 1813	From Alcide al bivio, 1st scene – Two versions (2nd in AGA)
78	(1895)	XX, 10; No. 572	IV, 6 No. 11	Aria di Venere	Son fra l'onde	18/9/1813	From Gli orti esperdi, I

== Oratorio ==
=== Lazarus, oder: Die Feier der Auferstehung ===
D. 689, Oratorio Lazarus, oder: Die Feier der Auferstehung for three sopranos, two tenors, bass, mixed choir and orchestra (1820, in three acts; unfinished – act 1: twenty-one numbers, and eight numbers from act 2 are extant)

Act 1

1. Introduktion
2. Hier laßt mich ruhn die letzte Stunde
3. Noch einen Augenblick?
4. Trübe nicht mit Klagen seine Seele
5. Steh' im letzten Kampf dem Müden
6. Voll Friede, ja, voll Fried' ist die Seele
7. Kalter Schweiß rinnt von der Stirn
8. Willkommen, mein Nathanael
9. Wenn ich ihm nachgerungen habe
10. Nathanael, bewundern kann ich dich
11. O Martha, o Martha, bliebst du stiller
12. Der Trost begleite dich hinüber
13. Wenn nun mit tausendfachen Qualen
14. Gottes Liebe, du bist deine Zuversicht
15. In der Leiden bängster Nacht
16. Ach, so find' ich ihn noch
17. Jemina, Tochter der Auferstehung
18. So schlummert auf Rosen
19. Nun entflog auf schnellen Schwingen
20. So war mir, Lazarus
21. O Barmherziger, o verlass ihn nicht

Act 3

22. Introduktion
23. Wo bin ich?
24. Schon bereitet ihr Gräber
25. Wess ist der Klage Stimme
26. So weile hier, mein Freund
27. Sanft und still
28. So legt ihn in die Blumen
29. Wecke sie nicht

== Sources ==
- Franz Schubert's Works (various editors and editions)
- Schubert Thematic Catalogue (various editions)
- Neue Schubert-Ausgabe (various editors and publication dates)
- Eva Badura-Skoda and Peter Branscombe. Schubert Studies: Problems of Style and Chronology. Cambridge University Press, 1982. Reprint 2008. ISBN 0521088720 ISBN 9780521088725 ISBN 9780521226066
- Reinhard Van Hoorickx. "Franz Schubert (1797–1828) List of the Dances in Chronological Order" in Revue belge de Musicologie/Belgisch Tijdschrift voor Muziekwetenschap, Vol. 25, No. 1/4, pp. 68–97, 1971
- Reinhard Van Hoorickx. "Thematic Catalogue of Schubert's Works: New Additions, Corrections and Notes" in Revue belge de Musicologie/Belgisch Tijdschrift voor Muziekwetenschap, Vol. 28/30, pp. 136–171, 1974–1976.
- Elizabeth Norman McKay. Franz Schubert's Music for the Theatre. H. Schneider, 1991. ISBN 3795206642
- Brian Newbould. Schubert: The Music and the Man. University of California Press, 1999. ISBN 0520219570 ISBN 9780520219571
