= Symphony No. 1 (Gottschalk) =

1859 symphony by Louis Moreau Gottschalk

- "La nuit des tropiques"
- by Louis Moreau Gottschalk
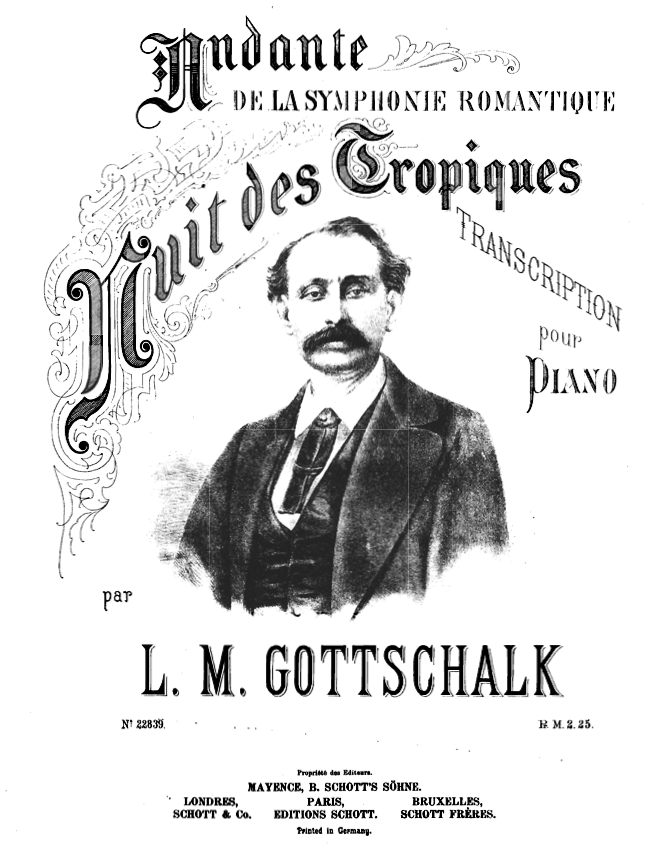
- Cover page of a c. 1879 piano arrangement of the first movement of Gottschalks's Symphony No. 1
- English: Night of the Tropics
- Other name: La nuit des tropiques
- Catalogue: D. 104 (RO 255)
- Composed: 1859
- Movements: 2

The Symphony No. 1 "La nuit des tropiques" (lit. Night of the Tropics), D. 104 (RO 255), is Louis Moreau Gottschalk's first and most well-known symphony.

== Background ==
The symphony was probably completed in 1858; the first movement, sometimes subtitled La nuit des tropiques, was premiered in Havana during the winter of the following year. Fourteen months later, the full symphony, with the second movement, "Une Fête sous les tropiques" (lit. A day in the tropics), was performed at one of Gottschalk's "monster concerts" with an orchestra of over 600 players, inspired by Berlioz's similar performance venues. The manuscript survived in Havana until 1932, when it was stolen, only to reappear in a New York Public Library in the 1950s.

The first premiere in the US was not until 5 May 1955, when Howard Shanet conducted the Columbia University Orchestra with his own arrangement of the score for a smaller orchestra. The symphony was first recorded in 1971, with an edition by Igor Buketoff that called for a total of only 150 players, including a full symphony orchestra, an extra band, and many Afro-Caribbean percussion instruments.

== Structure ==
The symphony is written in two movements:

1. Andante
2. Allegro moderato

The first movement, a "divine tropical sunset-with-storm," begins and ends with strings, building into an agitated section, where the winds and brass support them before coming back to the opening phrases. It is considered more "European" than the second movement, which historically is probably the first orchestral setting of a samba.

Forty-four measures from the end of the second movement are missing in the manuscript full score; although one conductor suggests this was possibly "for the orchestra to improvise in a jazz-like manner", this seems highly unlikely with such huge instrumental forces, plus the missing passage survives in a contemporary two-piano arrangement by Gottschalk's Brazilian friend and publisher Arthur Napoleão dos Santos.

A typical performance takes approximately 20 minutes.
