= August Ferdinand Häser =

German composer (1779–1844)

August Ferdinand Häser (15 October 1779 - 1 November 1844) was a German composer.

Häser was born in Leipzig into a musical family; the son of composer Johann Georg Häser, his three brothers were musicians, as was his sister Charlotte. A pupil at the St. Thomas School, Leipzig, he next studied theology at the University of Leipzig. In 1797 he traveled to Lemgo to teach mathematics. From 1806 until 1813 he traveled in Italy, returning to Lemgo in the latter year. In 1817 he moved to Weimar, where he became the music teacher of Princess Augusta and the chorus director of the Hoftheater. During his career he was active as well as a church organist and a teacher of the Italian language. He died in Weimar. His compositions include a requiem mass.
