= Friedrich von Matthisson =

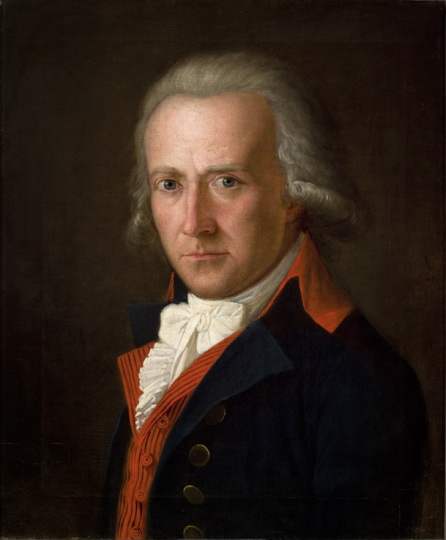
Friedrich von Matthisson (1794). Portrait by Ferdinand Hartmann

Friedrich von Matthisson (23 January 1761 – 12 March 1831) was a German poet, an early member of the German Romantic movement. His best known poem is probably Adelaide, which was set to music by Beethoven.

== Biography ==
He was born at Hohendodeleben near Magdeburg, the son of the village pastor, on 23 January 1761. After studying theology and philology at the university of Halle, he was appointed in 1781 master at the classical school Philanthropinum in Dessau. This once famous seminary was, however, then rapidly decaying in public favor, and in 1784 Matthisson was glad to accept a travelling tutorship. He lived for two years with the Swiss author Bonstetten at Nyon on Lake Geneva.

In 1794 he was appointed reader and traveling companion to Princess Louisa of Anhalt-Dessau (wife of Leopold III, Duke of Anhalt-Dessau). They visited Switzerland, Tyrol, and Italy. For a time, they were joined in their travels by Danish author and salonist Friederike Brun. After Princess Louisa's death in 1811, he entered the service of the king of Württemberg, was ennobled, created counselor of legation, appointed intendant of the court theatre and chief librarian of the royal library at Stuttgart. He resided for a time in Italy. In 1828 he retired and settled at Wörlitz near Dessau, where he died on 12 March 1831.

== Writings ==
Matthisson enjoyed for a time a great popularity on account of his Poems (German: Gedichte; 1787; 15th ed., 1851; new ed., 1876), which Schiller extravagantly praised for their melancholy sweetness and their fine descriptions of scenery. The Encyclopædia Britannica Eleventh Edition praised his verse as melodious and written with musical language, but complains that the thought and sentiments expressed are too often artificial and insincere. The 1905 New International Encyclopaedia judges "his verse melodious and graceful, especially in rural description, but never strong." His Adelaide was rendered famous by Beethoven's setting. Of Matthisson's elegies, Elegy in the Ruins of an Old Castle (German: Die Elegie in den Ruinen eines alten Bergschlosses) was still popular in 1911, and is praised by the 1879 American Cyclopaedia as one of his finest lyrics. He edited selections from the lyric poets of Germany under the title of Lyrische Anthologie (20 vols., Zürich, 1803–07). His Reminiscences (German: Erinnerungen; 5 vols., 1810-1816), contain interesting accounts of his travels.

Matthisson's Writings (German: Schriften) appeared in eight volumes (1825-1829), of which the first contains his poems and the other seven his Erinnerungen; a ninth volume was added in 1833 containing his biography by Heinrich Döring. His Literary Remains (German: Literarischer Nachlass), with a selection from his correspondence, was published in four volumes by F. R. Schoch in 1832.
