= Symphony No. 2 (Schubert) =

Musical work; symphony in four movements composed by Franz Schubert

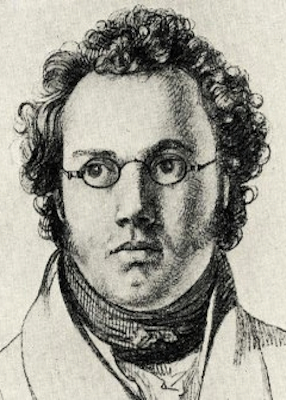
1821 Drawing of Franz Schubert by Josef Kupelwieser

The Symphony No. 2 in B♭ major, D. 125, is a symphony by Franz Schubert composed between 1814 and 1815. It is scored for two flutes, two oboes, two clarinets, two bassoons, two horns, two trumpets, timpani, and strings.

There are four movements:

1. Largo — Allegro vivace (614 bars)
2. Andante in E♭ major (122 bars)
3. Menuetto: Allegro vivace in C minor (44 bars) — Trio in E♭ major (24 bars)
4. Presto (727 bars)

The work runs about 31 minutes.

In the opening movement, the initial theme of the Allegro vivace is based on the corresponding first theme of Ludwig van Beethoven's overture to The Creatures of Prometheus.

The second movement is a theme with five variations in E♭ major, Schubert's only set of symphonic variations. Although there is some variation in the melody, the primary focus of the variations is on instrumentation and tone color. The first variation features violins and winds. The second variation passes the theme between the low strings and the woodwinds. The third variation is again violins and winds. The fourth variation is in C minor and features some acceleration with the use of triplet-sixteenth notes. The fifth variation maintains the triplet-sixteenths, but they move into the background with the melody returning close to its original form as a kind of recapitulation. A coda concludes the movement.

The minuet is in C minor and mainly scored for the tutti and fortissimo. The contrasting Trio in E♭ major is more thinly scored winds, violins and pizzicato bass. The melody of the trio is actually a variation of the theme used in the second movement, forming a melodic and harmonic (E♭ major/C minor) link between the inner two movements.

The finale is a galop in fast 2/4 time.
