= String Quartet No. 7 (Schubert) =

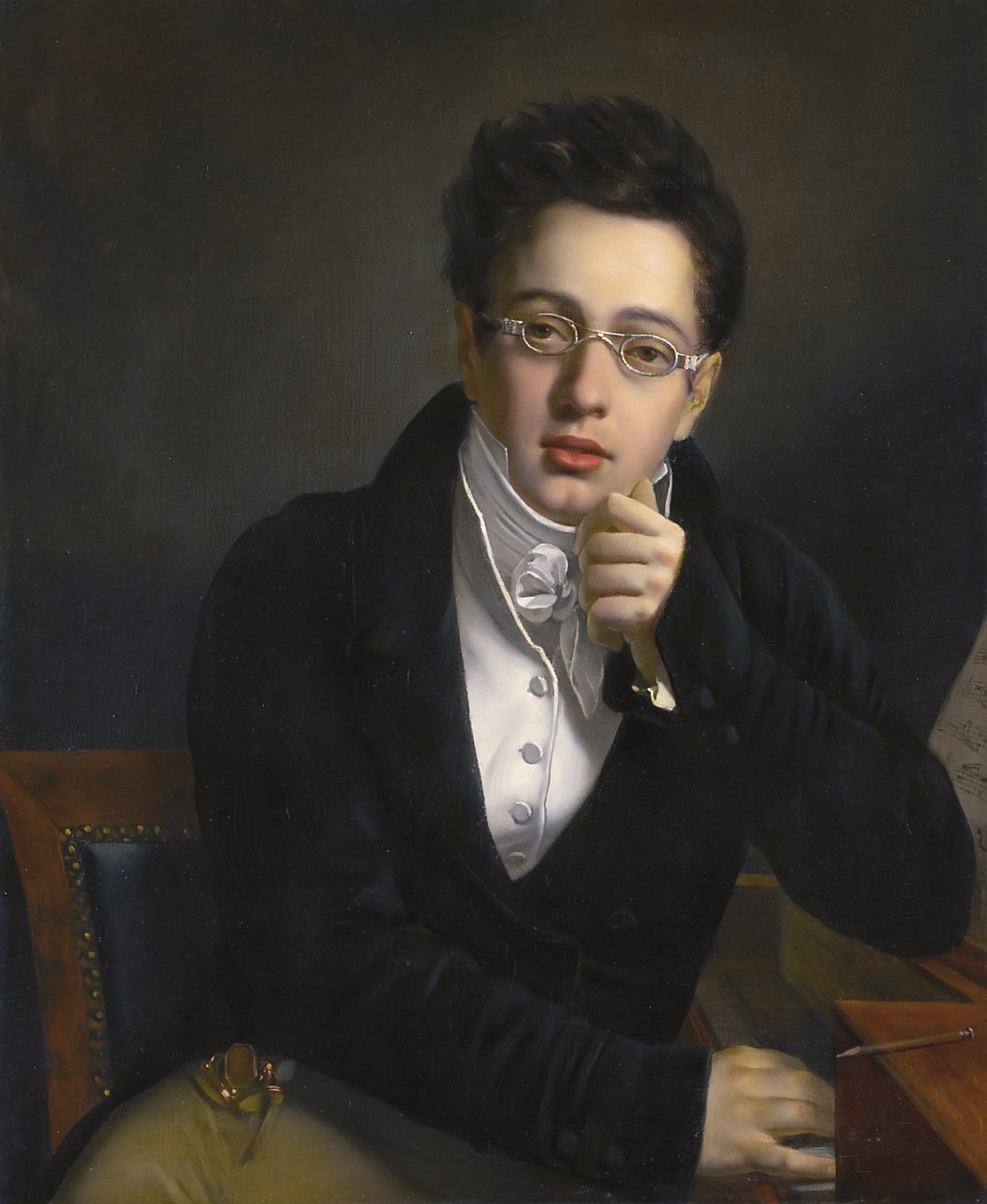
Possible portrait of the young Franz Schubert c. 1814, attributed to Josef Abel

The String Quartet No. 7 (D 94) in D major was composed by Franz Schubert in 1811 or 1812.

== Movements ==
The string quartet is in four movements:

1. Allegro (D major)
2. Andante con moto (G major)
3. Menuetto: Allegretto (D major, with Trio in B♭ major)
4. Presto (D major)

== Sources ==
- Franz Schubert's Works, Series V: Streichquartette edited by Joseph Hellmesberger and Eusebius Mandyczewski. Breitkopf & Härtel, 1890.
- Otto Erich Deutsch (and others). Schubert Thematic Catalogue (several editions), No. 94.
- New Schubert Edition, Series VI, Volume 3: Streichquartette I edited by Martin Chusid. Bärenreiter, 1979.
