= String Quartet No. 8 (Schubert) =

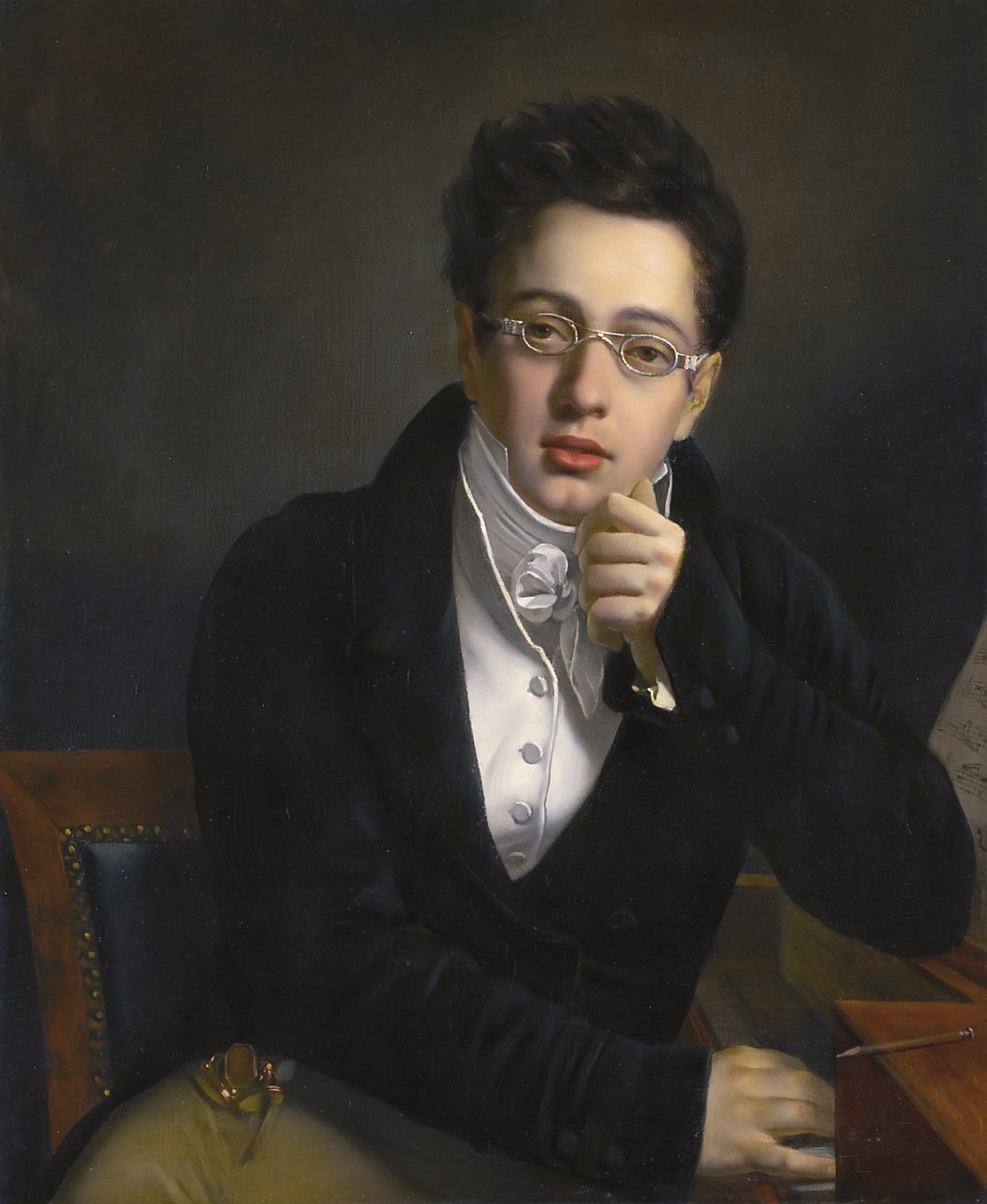
Possible portrait of the young Franz Schubert c. 1814, attributed to Josef Abel

The String Quartet No. 8 (D 112) in B♭ major was composed by Franz Schubert in 1814. It was posthumously published as Op. 168.

== Movements ==
The string quartet has four movements:

1. Allegro ma non troppo (B♭ major)
2. Andante sostenuto (G minor)
3. Menuetto: Allegro (E♭ major, with Trio in E♭ major)
4. Presto (B♭ major)

== Sources ==
- Franz Schubert's Works, Series V: Streichquartette edited by Joseph Hellmesberger and Eusebius Mandyczewski. Breitkopf & Härtel, 1890.
- Otto Erich Deutsch (and others). Schubert Thematic Catalogue (several editions), No. 112.
- New Schubert Edition, Series VI, Volume 4: String Quartets II edited by Werner Aderhold, Bärenreiter, 1994.
