= Gretchen am Spinnrade =

Song composed by Franz Schubert

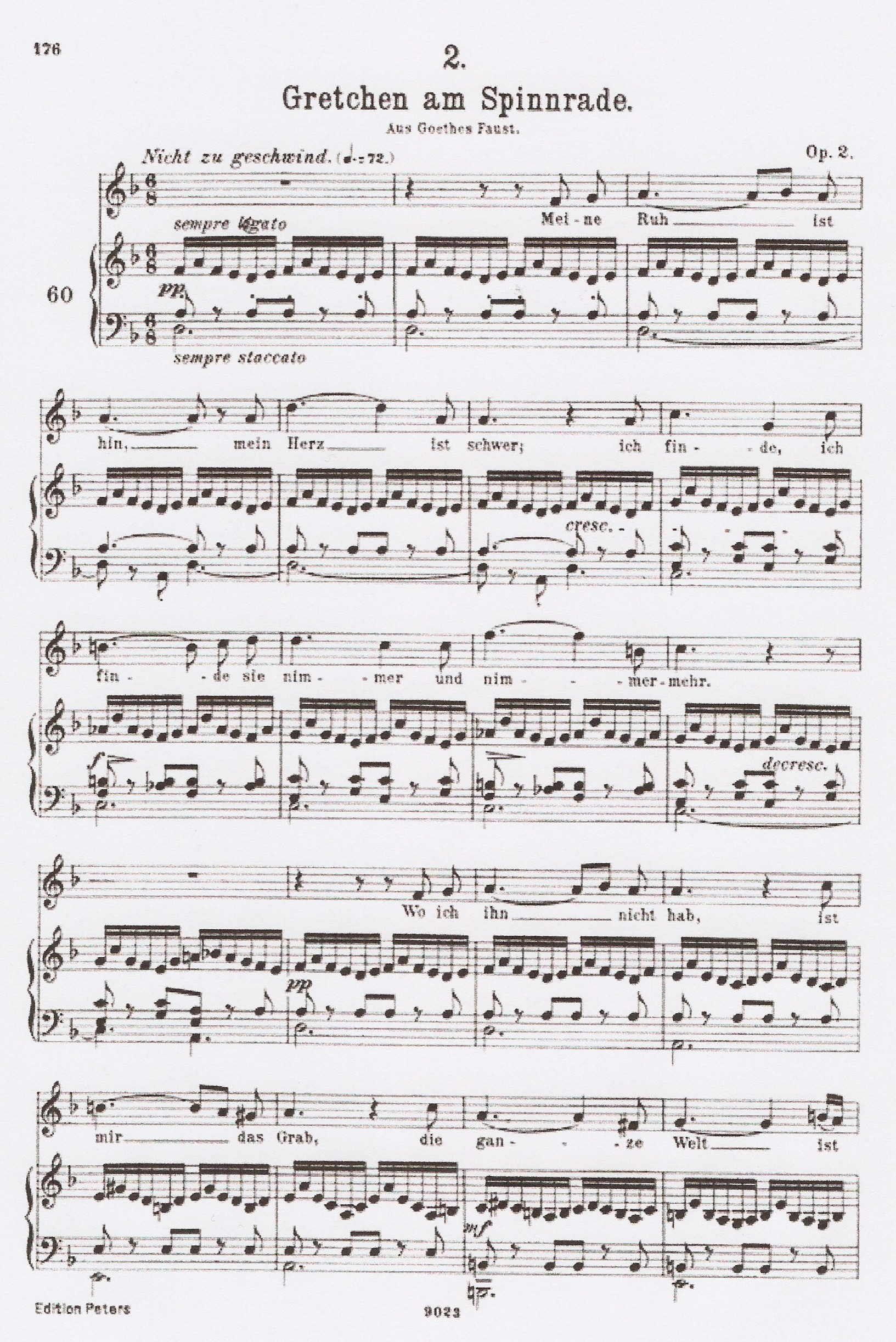
Page 1

"Gretchen am Spinnrade" (Gretchen at the Spinning Wheel), Op. 2, D 118, is a Lied composed by Franz Schubert using the text from Part One, scene 15 of Johann Wolfgang von Goethe's Faust. With "Gretchen am Spinnrade" and some 600 other songs for voice and piano, Schubert contributed transformatively to the genre of Lied. "Gretchen am Spinnrade" was composed for soprano voice but has been transposed to accommodate other voice types. Schubert composed "Gretchen am Spinnrade" on 19 October 1814, three months before his eighteenth birthday.

== German text ==
Meine Ruh' ist hin,
Mein Herz ist schwer;
Ich finde sie nimmer
Und nimmermehr.

Wo ich ihn nicht hab'
Ist mir das Grab,
Die ganze Welt
Ist mir vergällt.

Mein armer Kopf
Ist mir verrückt,
Mein armer Sinn
Ist mir zerstückt.

Meine Ruh' ist hin,
Mein Herz ist schwer;
Ich finde sie nimmer
Und nimmermehr.

Nach ihm nur schau' ich
Zum Fenster hinaus,
Nach ihm nur geh' ich
Aus dem Haus.

Sein hoher Gang,
Sein' edle Gestalt,
Seines Mundes Lächeln,
Seiner Augen Gewalt,

Und seiner Rede
Zauberfluß,
Sein Händedruck,
Und ach sein Kuß!

Meine Ruh' ist hin,
Mein Herz ist schwer,
Ich finde sie nimmer
Und nimmermehr.

Mein Busen drängt
Sich nach ihm hin.
Ach dürft ich fassen
Und halten ihn!

Und küssen ihn
So wie ich wollt',
An seinen Küssen
Vergehen sollt'!

== Analysis ==
The song opens with Gretchen at her spinning wheel, thinking of Faust and all that he had promised. The accompaniment in the right hand mimics the perpetual movement of the spinning-wheel and the left hand imitates the foot treadle. The initial key of D minor sets a longing tone as Gretchen begins to sing of her heartache ("Meine Ruh' ist hin/Mein herz ist schwer"). The first section progresses from D minor to C major, A minor, E minor, F major, and then returns to D minor. This, plus the crescendo, builds tension which releases only to be brought back to the beginning, much like the ever-circling spinning wheel. The song modulates to F major as Gretchen starts talking of Faust ("Sein hoher Gang/Sein' edle Gestalt"). The left-hand imitation of the treadle disappears and changes to block chords. Additionally, the absence of the rhythmic, consistent treadle allows Gretchen to lose her sense of stability and reality as she swoons over Faust. This section increases tension with a faster tempo, louder dynamics, and higher pitch in the soprano and peaks at Gretchen's remembrance of Faust's kiss ("Und ach, sein Kuß!"). Similar to the previous section, the music returns to the home key of D minor as Gretchen resumes reality and begins her spinning once more. The third part begins again with "Meine Ruh' ist hin/Mein herz ist schwer," but this time Gretchen escalates in intensity much faster than the previous sections. However, the treadle-like left hand is present, keeping her rooted in reality. Gretchen comes down from this fantasy quicker than before, as she realizes she and Faust will never be together. With a heavy heart, Gretchen comes to terms with this hard truth. The song ends as it began: in D minor, alluding to the monotony of the spinning wheel, and how reality is always present.

== Notable recordings ==
Notable recordings include those by

- Elly Ameling and Jörg Demus
- Elly Ameling and Dalton Baldwin
- Barbara Bonney and Geoffrey Parsons
- Janet Baker and Gerald Moore.
- Anne Sofie von Otter, Schubert Lieder with Orchestra, CD, accompanied by the Chamber Orchestra of Europe led by Claudio Abbado.

Other notable recordings include those by Kathleen Ferrier, Renée Fleming, Brigitte Fassbaender, Janet Baker, Kiri Te Kanawa, Dawn Upshaw, Christa Ludwig, Gundula Janowitz, Jessye Norman, Irmgard Seefried, Elisabeth Schumann, Lotte Lehmann, Rosette Anday, and Elisabeth Schwarzkopf. The male singer Benjamin Appl has also recorded the song. Nina Hagen, titled "Gretchen" on her 1991 album Street is an interesting electronic adaptation.
