= Piter Poel =

- Born: Pieter / Petrus Poel; June 17, 1760; Arkhangelsk, Russia
- Died: 3 October 1836; Altona, Holstein
- Occupations: Diplomat; Newspaper publisher
- Spouse: Friederike Elisabeth Büsch (1787)
- Children: 11 recorded children including Gustav Poel
- Parent(s): Jacobus "Jan" Poel (1712-1775); Magdalena van Brienen/Poel (?-1763)

Piter Poel (17 June 1760 – 3 October 1837) was a diplomat who in his later years became the publisher of the "Altonaischer Mercurius" (newspaper). A couple of years after his baptism his Godfather, Peter, Duke of Holstein-Gottorp, became (for just six months, during 1762) the Tsar of Russia.

Poel was born in Russia, but his father had been born in the Netherlands, and at the time of his baptism his first name is thought to have been spelled in family and church records as "Pieter" or "Petrus". Sources also sometimes identify him as Peter Poel.

== Life ==
=== Family provenance ===
Piter Poel was born in Arkhangelsk, where his father, Jacobus "Jan" Poel, had been sent by Rutger van Brienen to set up a northern branch of the St. Petersburg based van Brienen trading company. Rutger van Brienen was both the business partner and the father-in-law of Jan Poel, who had married, as his second wife, Magdalena van Brienen around 1750. Piter was his parents' fourth recorded child, and his father's sixth recorded child. Sources comment admiringly on Jan Poel's ability as a linguist: he had undergone a commercial training in Leiden and was fluent in Dutch, Russian and German.

The Poel family connection with St. Petersburg dated back at least to the time of Pieter's grandfather, another Jacobus "Jan" Poel/Pool (1682-?), the son of an Amsterdam boat builder who had emigrated during the first part of the eighteenth century and become a "ship builder to the tsars".

=== Early years ===
The first three years of Pieter Poel's life were eventful. At the time of his birth his father had befriended Peter, Duke of Holstein-Gottorp, a grandson of Peter the Great. The Duke had been born in Kiel and spoke very little Russian which explains why he drew his friends from St. Petersburg's German expatriate community. It was a mark of the friendship between the Dutch born merchant and the future Tsar that the Duke became Piter Poel's Godfather ("Patenonkel"). In January 1762 the Russian Empress died and her nephew, the Duke of Holstein-Gottorp, became Tsar Peter III. The new Tsar now invited his friend, Jan Poel, to look after his estates in southern Holstein, and to supervise his pet project there, which involved the construction of a canal. Jan Poel accordingly travelled to Holstein and took up his new duties.

A few weeks later the new Tsar was assassinated. His widow, remembered in history as Catherine the Great, spent the next 34 years building up Russia and denigrating the reputation of her late husband. Following the death of his friend, the Tsar, Jan Poel hurriedly closed down his business activities in Arkhangelsk and moved his young family to Hamburg where he had contacts in the merchant community. The year after the move, on 8 October 1763, Magdalena Poel, Pieter's mother, died at Hamburg.

Between the ages of 3 and 6 Pieter Poel was brought up at an orphanage/boarding school together with his sister Magdalena, who was three years older than he was. Between the ages of 6 and 15 he was educated at a boys' boarding school. His childhood therefore gave him very little experience of family life.

=== Apprenticeship and university ===
Jan Poel died in 1775 and left Piter a sufficient inheritance to allow him some independence and to fund a university education. From 1776 till 1778 he undertook a commercial apprenticeship with a company in Bordeaux, which he later described as one of Europe's dirtiest cities ("verderbsten Städte"). At Bordeaux he mastered the French language and developed an affection for French theatre.

Piter then lived for a couple of years in Geneva where he studied intensively in order to prepare for an application to a German university, before moving to Göttingen where in November 1780 he enrolled at the University for a period of study that covered History, Statecraft and Social economics, with the intention of undertaking a career as a diplomat. His lecturers included Ludwig Timotheus Spittler. He was encouraged in his pursuit of a university education by his sister Magdalena, who herself had been in a somewhat restless marriage with Adrian Wilhelm Pauli, another member of the Hamburg merchant class, since 1776. While at Göttingen he became a member of the influential "ZN" Student fraternity in 1781, as he would much later recall in his memoirs. Poel made full use of the networking opportunities that the fraternity membership provided.

=== St. Petersburg and Stockholm ===
At the end of the summer term he left Göttingen and headed for St. Petersburg, where his maternal uncle, Abraham van Brienen, was widely considered to have become a man of great influence in both the commercial and political worlds: while in St. Petersburg Poel was able to get to know some of his uncle's contacts. During 1783 and 1784 he was employed with the rank of Captain as a secretary and interpreter at the College of Foreign Affairs (Foreign Ministry) in St. Petersburg. His uncle had promised to get him a position in the Russian diplomatic service, but towards the end of 1784 Poel gave up on the idea of a diplomatic career with the Russians and moved to Sweden, where he tried to obtain a position in public service. Despite his good contacts in the business world, no suitable government job was forthcoming, however. There are suggestions that his adherence to a reformed version of the Protestant faith may have counted against him with the resolutely Lutheran political establishment in Stockholm.

=== Settling in Hamburg and Altona ===
In 1785 Piter Poel moved to Hamburg where he developed a close friendship with merchant Caspar Voght. Early 1786 the two of them set out on an extended business trip, taking in Paris and London. Poel would remain on good terms with Voght for the rest of his life. In 1789 Poel moved house again, relocating to Altona. In 1938 Altona became a western suburb of Hamburg, but in 1789 it was not merely a separate municipality, but part of a different jurisdiction, the Duchy of Holstein. Piter Pohl now lived in Altona for nearly fifty years, and it is where he would die in 1837.

Friendship with Caspar Voght opened many doors for Piter Pohl. He joined a social circle that also included the pioneering physician Johann Reimarus and the merchant Georg Heinrich Sieveking. Another member of the circle was the mathematics guru and creator of the Hamburg Trade Academy, Johann Georg Büsch. In 1787 Piter Poel married Büsch's daughter, Friedericke Elisabeth (1768 - 1821). The marriage was a happy one and resulted in eleven recorded children.

In Altona he acquired the right to publish the venerable "Altonaische Mercurius" (newspaper), while not dictating editorial policy of what was, in its day, one of the most influential German-language newspapers in northern Europe. In Altona Piter Poel also undertook work as a journalist and writer.

In 1793 Poel joined with two of his friends to buy a country house beside the Elbe at Neumühlen, a half hour walk to the west of his town house in Altona's Große Freiheit (street). The other purchasers were the merchant and enlightenment philosopher Georg Heinrich Sieveking (1751-1799) and the banker-merchant Conrad Johann Matthiessen (1751-1822). Together the three of them developed the house as a summer residence which quickly became known as a meeting point for Hamburg's wealthy cosmopolitan elite. The project survived Sieveking's early death in 1799 and Matthiessen's divorce in 1801, but the house at Neumühlen as sold in 1811 and Poel set up a home in Teufelsbrück a few hundred meters further downstream. Between 1816 and 1822 he lived together with Caspar Voght at house in Flottbek, another settlement on the western fringe of Altona, and it was here that on 18 October 1821 his wife died following a two-day illness. After the same of the Neumühlen house, his subsequent homes continued to provide a social hub for the Hamburg elite, with Poel himself at the heart of things. Four years after he was widowed his elder sister Magdalena, with whom he had always been close, fell ill and he rushed to her home in Bückeburg to take his leave of her, but arrived too late. Seven of his eleven children had lived into adulthood, and Piter Poel now withdrew increasingly into private life, while still sustaining friendships, notably with Caspar Voght and the Danish diplomat Johann Georg Rist who lived in Altona between 1815 and 1834.

=== Literary legacy ===
During this period he began to work on his memoirs, covering the years up to the outbreak of the French Revolution. He insisted that these were not intended for publication despite the promptings of "insightful" friends. A couple of years before his death, in 1835 he agreed to the publication of fragments of his memoirs, notably in the "Altonaer Merkur" (newspaper). He also published a lengthy work on the reoccupation of Hamburg by the French in 1813, which was published under the title "Hamburgs Untergang". Much later his son Gustav Poel (1804-1895) published various of his father's papers under the title "Bilder aus vergangener Zeit".
