= Conrad Johann Matthiessen =

Hamburg merchant

Conrad Johann Matthiessen (25 July 1751 – 23 January 1822) was a leading Hamburg merchant and banker during the French Revolutionary Wars. An enthusiastic backer of the revolution during its early phases, in 1796 he married a French woman, though they were divorced five years later.

== Biography ==
Matthiessen's father was Hieronymus Matthiessen, another prosperous Hamburg merchant. His mother, born Susanne Texier, came from a Huguenot family, and was an elder sister to the German-Dutch diplomat, Peter Texier.

He became a partner in the trading house of "Matthiesen & Sillem". He is better known, however, on account of his networking and travelling. He numbered Georg Heinrich Sieveking and Caspar Voght among his closest friends. Among the women in the group his closer friends included Elise Reimarus, Magdalena Pauli and the writer-poet Elisa von der Recke who describes him in her diary as a "pure, noble and beautiful soul ... better suited for Heaven than for Earth". He was a member and regular presence at the "Monday Society", founded in 1784 by Friedrich Gottlieb Klopstock and Johann Georg Büsch. In 1787, on account of his frequent travels, he transferred his share in the day-to-day management of "Matthiesen & Sillem" to his cousin and business partner, Hieronymus Sillem.

Matthiessen was one of many educated men and women across who reacted with enthusiasm to the outbreak of the French Revolution in Paris in 1789. In July 1790 he was one of approximately eighty leading Hamburg intellectuals who took part in the "Revolution Festival" arranged by Sieveking and held in a pub garden at Harvestehude to celebrate the first anniversary of the Storming of the Bastille. During the winter of 1790/91 he stayed in Paris, becoming a member of "Club 87" and established a connection with de La Rochefoucauld. By July 1791 he was back in Hamburg where he was elected to membership of the "Kollegium der Armenanstalt", overseeing Caspar Voght's Allgemeine Armenanstalt (welfare and support institution for the poor). Later his trips to Paris became increasingly frequent, and he made it a personal priority to provide support for Parisians in need. During his final years he was providing support for eighty families, visiting them all for as long as his strength permitted it.

In 1793 Matthisen joined with two of his friends to buy a country house beside the Elbe at Neumühlen, a half hour's walk to the west of Altona, on a piece of land today known as Donners Park. The other purchasers were the merchant and enlightenment philosopher Georg Heinrich Sieveking (1751-1799) and the newspaperman-diplomat Piter Poel (1760-1837). Together the three of them developed the house as a summer residence which quickly became known as a meeting point for Hamburg's wealthy cosmopolitan elite.

In 1796 he transferred his share in the property to his friends and acquired a property in Niendorf, at that time still outside Hamburg, a couple of kilometers inland and to the north of the Elbe. This was also the year in which Matthiessen married Henriette Rose Peronne de Sercey, a niece of the Countess of Genlis who had escaped from France in 1793/94 following the execution of the countess's estranged husband and other family members. The Matthiessens' marriage ended in divorce in 1801. Their daughter, Émilie Conradine Matthiessen, was born in Hamburg on 28 June of the same year. Émilie later, in 1822, married the English aristocrat-politician Charles Strickland Standish.

Conrad Johann Matthiessen died in Paris on 23 January 1822.
