= Johann Gottfried Schmeisser =

Johann Gottfried Schmeisser FRS FRSE
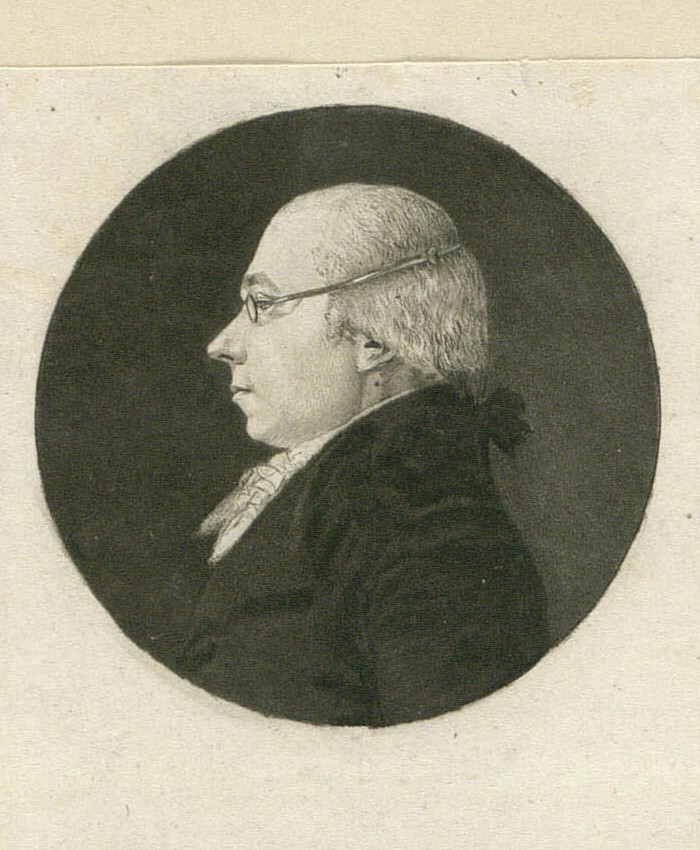
- Born: 24 June 1767; Sankt Andreasberg, Electorate of Hanover
- Died: 5 February 1837 (aged 69); Hamburg
- Scientific career
- Fields: Chemistry, mineralogy, pharmacy

Johann Gottfried Schmeisser (also spelt Schmeißer; 24 June 1767 – 5 February 1837) was a German apothecary, physician, chemist and mineralogist who travelled widely.

== Early years ==
He was born on 24 June 1767 in Andreasberg in the Harz, the son of the town's preacher and rector. He was apprenticed to Johann Ludwig Gosche as a pharmacist in Bockenem. He then worked as a pharmacist in Brunswick and Hamburg.

== Career ==
He travelled from Hamburg to London with recommendations to Joseph Banks. There he studied botany under James Edward Smith and anatomy under John Hunter, and worked for the court apothecary Dr Brande. He began lecturing in chemistry and mineralogy in London. He met Caspar Voght and toured England, Scotland and Ireland with him.

On the recommendation of Banks and the Duke of Leeds, he was elected a Fellow of the Royal Society of London on 20 March 1794. On 26 January 1795 he was elected a Fellow of the Royal Society of Edinburgh during his tour of Scotland. His proposers were John Rotherham, Andrew Duncan, and William Wright. He was also a member of the Linnean Society. He was ejected from the Royal Society of London on 30 November 1822.

After touring Britain and Ireland with Voght, he spent several years at Voght's estate in Flottbek, where Voght had a chemical laboratory built. Schmeisser worked on chemistry, especially agricultural chemistry. He also taught at the agricultural school founded by Lucas Andreas Staudinger. He later accompanied Voght's friend Georg Heinrich Sieveking to Paris, where he became a member of the Société philomathique. He then travelled through Germany with Voght, and with Johann Georg Büsch to the Harz, Brunswick, Göttingen and Hanover. He received a doctorate in medicine from Helmstedt. Schmeisser later lived for several years in Altona, where he owned a pharmacy and gave lessons in chemistry and other sciences; he was an apothecary there by 1802.

After a journey to Copenhagen, he settled in Hamburg, where he practised medicine and gave lectures on the practical applications of physics and chemistry. He was among the first to introduce popular public lectures to Hamburg. He died on 5 February 1837 in Hamburg.

== Family ==
He was married to Louise Janette Texier, daughter of the diplomat Peter Texier, and they had two daughters, Louise Josephine Janette and Ida Charlotte, and a son, Adolf Schmeisser, born in Altona on 11 July 1802.

== Publications ==
- Syllabus of Lectures on Mineralogy (London, 1794)
- A System of Mineralogy, Formed Chiefly on the Plan of Cronstedt (2 vols, London, 1794–95)
- Beyträge zur näheren Kenntniss des gegenwärtigen Zustandes der Wissenschaften in Frankreich [Contributions to a Closer Knowledge of the Present State of the Sciences in France] (2 parts, Hamburg, 1797–98)
