= List of compositions by Franz Schubert (1818) =

Franz Schubert's compositions from 1818 are primarily listed in the Deutsch catalogue (D) as D 599–632, and include:

- Instrumental works:
  - Symphony in D major, D 615 (sketch)
  - Piano Sonata in C major, D 613
  - Piano Sonata in F minor, D 625
- Vocal music:
  - Three Sonnets, D 628–630, with German adapted from Petrarch's original Italian poetry.

== Table ==
=== Legend ===
Legend to the table
column		content
1	D '51	Deutsch number in the first version of the Deutsch catalogue (1951)
2	D utd	most recent (utd = up to date) Deutsch catalogue number; the basic collation of the list is according to these numbers – whether or not the possibility to adjust the sorting according to the content of other columns is available depends on the device with which the table is displayed.
3	Op. pbl	Opus number (Op.; p indicates Post. = posthumous) and date of first publication (pbl; between brackets; when there is more than one date the earlier dates indicate partial publications). The column sorts to Opus number, then (earliest of) the publication date(s)
4	AGA	Alte Gesamt-Ausgabe = Franz Schubert's Werke: Kritisch durchgesehene Gesammtausgabe. Indicates genre/instrumentation: Series I: Symphonien (Nos. 1-8) (Johannes Brahms, 1884); Series II: Overtüren und Andere Orchesterwerke (Johann Nepomuk Fuchs, 1886); Series III: Oktette (Nos. 1-3) and IV: Streichquintett (Eusebius Mandyczewski, 1889); Series V: Streichquartette (Nos. 1-15) (Joseph Hellmesberger and Eusebius Mandyczewski, 1890); Series VI: Trio für Streichinstrumente (Eusebius Mandyczewski, 1892); Series VII: Trios, Quartets and Quintets with Piano and VIII: Pianoforte und Ein Instrument (Ignaz Brüll, 1886); Series IX: Pianoforte zu vier Händen (Anton Door, 1888); Series X: Sonaten für Pianoforte (Julius Epstein, 1888); Series XI: Fantasie, Impromptus und andere Stücke für Pianoforte (Julius Epstein, 1888); Series XII: Tänze für Pianoforte (Nos. 1-31) (Julius Epstein, 1889); Series XIII: Messen (Nos. 1-7) (Eusebius Mandyczewski, 1887); Series XIV: Kleinere Kirchenmusikwerke (Nos. 1-22) (Eusebius Mandyczewski, 1888); Series XV: Dramatische Musik (Johann Nepomuk Fuchs, 1893); Series XVI: Werke für Männerchor (Nos. 1-46) (Eusebius Mandyczewski, 1891); Series XVII: Werke für gemischten Chor (Nos. 1-19) (Josef Gänsbacher, Eusebius Mandyczewski, 1892); Series XVIII: Werke für Drei und mehr Frauenstimmen mit Pianoforte-Begleitung (Nos. 1-6) (Josef Gänsbacher, Eusebius Mandyczewski, 1891); Series XIX: Kleine Gesangswerke (Nos. 1-36) (Josef Gänsbacher and Eusebius Mandyczewski, 1892); Series XX: Sämtliche einstimmige Lieder und Gesänge (Eusebius Mandyczewski, 1894-1895); Series XXI: Supplement (Eusebius Mandyczewski, 1897); 1. Instrumentalmusik No. 1-5; 2. Instrumentalmusik No. 6-13; 3. Instrumentalmusik No. 14-; 4. Gesangsmusik; Series XXII: Revisionsbericht
5	NSA	NGA/NSA/NSE = New Schubert Edition, also indicates genre/instrumentation: Series I: Church Music; Series II: Stage Works; Series III: Part Songs; Series IV: Lieder; Series V: Orchestral Works; Series VI: Chamber Music; 1. Octet and Nonet; 2. String Quintet; 3. String Quartets I; 4. String Quartets II; 5. String Quartets III; 6. String Trios; 7. Works for Piano and several instruments; 8. Works for Piano and one instrument; 9. Dances for several instruments; Series VII: Piano Music; 1. Works for Piano Four Hands; 2. Works for Piano Two Hands; Series VIII: Supplement, 2. Schubert's Studies
6	Name	unique name, with, if available, a link to the relevant encyclopedia article; sorts by name with initial definite ("Der", "Die", "Das", ...) or indefinite ("Ein", "A", ...) articles, and numbers, moved after the expression they qualify: e.g. "Die Hoffnung, ..." sorts as "Hoffnung, Die, ..." – "Thirty Minuets ..." sorts as "Minuets, 30, ...".
7	Key / incipit	incipit mostly for songs (linking to lyrics and their translation, for instance at The LiederNet Archive, when available), other compositions by key, except for Schubert's stage works: type of composition in brackets.
8	Date	(presumed) date of composition, or, for copies and arrangements, date of Schubert's autograph. Sorts to earliest possible date of completion, unlike the chronology of the Deutsch catalogue that generally collates according to earliest date associated with the composition: e.g. Schubert started the composition of his 3rd String Quartet on 19 November 1812 and completed it on 21 February 1813 – in the Deutsch catalogue the composition is grouped with other compositions from 1812: when using the sort function of the 8th column the composition is grouped with compositions completed in 1813
9	Additional info	may include: Information about the text (lyrics, libretto) of vocal compositions: e.g., "Text by [text author]", "Text: [standard lyrics]", "... from [literary work]"; "other settings: D ..." indicates Schubert's other settings of the same text; for fields starting with "Text ..." this column sorts by text author (last name, first name—or pen name when such name is more established), then incipit of the lyrics (alternatively, when the incipit is rarely used, title of the work); Information about the authenticity of the composition: the work is without doubt Schubert's unless when marked as "Doubtful", "Spurious?" or "Spurious" (in the last case columns 3–8 give no further information about the composition); Forces needed for performance ("For ..."): may be omitted when the type of composition makes the instrumentation clear (e.g. String Quartet → two violins, viola and cello), and, for vocal music, when the setting is for voice and piano; "s", "a", "t" and "b" refer to a single soprano, alto, tenor and bass singer respectively, while "S", "A", "T" and "B" to choral parts for the same types of singers (see SATB).; Specifications regarding movements (e.g. "Allegro – Minuet – Rondo") or sections (e.g. "No. 1 ..."); Information about the completeness of the extant work: the work is considered complete as extant unless when marked "Sketch", "Incomplete", "Unfinished", "Fragment" or "Lost"; Information about versions (e.g. "Two versions: ...")

=== List ===
Compositions by Franz Schubert listed in the Deutsch catalogue for 1818
D '51	D utd	Op. pbl	AGA	NSA	Name	Key / incipit	Date	Additional info
599	599	75 (1827)	IX, 3 No. 26	VII/1, 4	Four Polonaises	Various keys	July 1818	For piano duet
600	600	(1897)	XXI, 3 No. 27	VII/2, 4	Minuet, D 600	C♯ minor	early 1814?	For piano; May combine with D 610 and/or D 613
601	470							See D 470
602	602	27 (1824)	IX, 1 No. 1	VII/1, 4	Trois Marches héroiques	Various keys	1818 or 1824	For piano duet
604	604	(1888)	XI No. 10	VII/2, 4	Piano piece, D 604, a.k.a. Andante	A major	1816 or 1817	2nd movement of D 571?
605	605	(1897)	XXI, 3 No. 15	VII/2, 4 Anh.	Fantasy, D 605	C major	1821–1823	For piano; Fragment
	605A	(1969)		VII/2, 4	Fantasy, D 605A, a.k.a. Grazer Fantasy	C major	1818?	For piano
606	606	(1840)	XI No. 16	VII/2, 4	March, D 606	E major	1818?	For piano
607	607			I, 8	Evangelium Johannis 6, Vers 55–58	In der Zeit sprach der Herr Jesus	1818	Text by John (Luther translation); For voice and figured bass
608	608	138p (1834)	IX, 2 No. 14	VII/1, 1 No. 4 & Anh. No. 4	Rondo, D 608, "Notre amitié est invariable"	D major	January; 1818	For piano duet; Two versions: 2nd, in AGA, is Op. posth. 138
609; 665	609	(1872)	XVII; No. 13	III, 2a No. 10	Die Geselligkeit a.k.a. Lebenslust	Wer Lebenslust fühlet	January; 1818	Text by Unger; For satb and piano; 2nd part of 1st stanza, "im traulichen Kreise", was D 665
610	610	(1889)	XII; No. 31	VII/2, 6	Trio, D 610	E major	February; 1818	For piano; May belong to D 600, and together with that minuet to D 613
611	611	(1850)	XX, 5 No. 336	IV, 12	Auf der Riesenkoppe	Hoch auf dem Gipfel deiner Gebirge	March 1818	Text by Körner
612	612	(1869)	XI No. 11	VII/2, 4	Adagio, D 612	E major	April 1818	For piano; 2nd movement of D 613?
613	613	(1897)	XXI, 2 No. 11	VII/2, 2	Piano Sonata, D 613	C major	April 1818	Moderato – [?]; Fragments; D 612 and 600/610 may constitute its other movements
614	614	(1832)	XX, 5 No. 337	IV, 12	An den Mond in einer Herbstnacht	Freundlich ist dein Antlitz	April 1818	Text by Schreiber
615	615			V, 6 No. 9	Symphony, D 615	D major	May 1818	Adagio, Allegro moderato – [?]; Sketches
616	616	(1830)	XX, 5 No. 338	IV, 12	Grablied für die Mutter	Hauche milder, Abendluft	June 1818	
617	617	30 (1823)	IX, 2 No. 11	VII/1, 1 No. 5	Sonata, D 617	B♭ major	Summer– Autumn; 1818(?)	For piano duet; Allegro moderato – Andante con moto – Allegretto
618	618	(1909)		VII/1, 4	German Dance with Two Trios and Two Ländler	G major (Deutscher/Trios); E major (Ländler)	Summer– Autumn; 1818	For piano duet
618A	618A	(1972)		VII/1, 4	Polonaise, D 618A	B♭ major	July 1818	For piano duet; Sketch
619	619	(1892)	XIX; No. 36	III, 2b No. 22; VIII, 2 No. 9	Sing-Übungen (vocal exercises)		July 1818	For two voices and figured bass
620	620	(1840)	XX, 5 No. 339	IV, 12	Einsamkeit, D 620	Gib mir die Fülle der Einsamkeit!	July 1818	Text by Mayrhofer
621	621	(1826)		I, 6 Anh.	Deutsches Requiem (German Requiem) a.k.a. Deutsche Trauermesse	G minor Bei des Entschlafnen Trauerbahre	August 1818	Text by Schmid; Only known in Ferd. Schubert's arrangements; Publ. 1826 for satbSATB and organ
622	622	(1833)	XX, 5 No. 340	IV, 12	Der Blumenbrief	Euch Blümlein will ich senden	August 1818	Text by Schreiber
623	623	(1831)	XX, 5 No. 341	IV, 12	Das Marienbild	Sei gegrüßt, du Frau der Huld	August 1818	Text by Schreiber
624	624	10 (1822)	IX, 2 No. 15	VII/1, 1 No. 6 & Anh. Nos. 5–6	Eight Variations on a French Song (i.e. Le bon Chevalier)	E minor	September; 1818	Theme after Hortense de Beauharnais; For piano duet
625	625	(1897)	XXI, 2 No. 12	VII/2, 2 No. 10	Piano Sonata, D 625	F minor	September; 1818	Allegro (fragment) – Scherzo – Allegro (fragment); D 505 may be its 2nd movement
626	626	(1842)	XX, 5 No. 343	IV, 12	Blondel zu Marien	In düstrer Nacht	September; 1818	
627	627	173p,6 (1867)	XX, 5 No. 344	IV, 12	Das Abendrot, D 627	Du heilig, glühend Abendrot!	November; 1818	Text by Schreiber; For b and piano
628	628	(1895)	XX, 5 No. 345	IV, 12	Sonett I	Apollo, lebet noch dein hold Verlangen	November; 1818	Text by Petrarch, transl. by Schlegel, A. W.
629	629	(1895)	XX, 5 No. 346	IV, 12	Sonett II	Allein, nachdenklich, wie gelähmt vom Krampfe	November; 1818	Text by Petrarch, transl. by Schlegel, A. W.
630	630	(1895)	XX, 5 No. 347	IV, 12	Sonett III	Nunmehr, da Himmel, Erde schweigt	November; 1818	Text by Petrarch, transl. by Gries
631	631	(1885)	XX, 5 No. 348	IV, 12	Blanka a.k.a. Das Mädchen	Wenn mich einsam Lüfte fächeln	December; 1818	Text by Schlegel, F.
632	632	(1831)	XX, 5 No. 349	IV, 12	Vom Mitleiden Mariä	Als bei dem Kreuz Maria stand	December; 1818	Text by Schlegel, F.

== Sources ==
Multi-volume editions, websites and catalogues

- Alte Gesamt-Ausgabe (AGA) = Franz Schubert's Works: Schubert, Franz (1884–1897). Johannes Brahms; Ignaz Brüll; Anton Door; Julius Epstein; Johann Nepomuk Fuchs; Josef Gänsbacher; Joseph Hellmesberger Sr.; Eusebius Mandyczewski (eds.). Franz Schubert's Werke: Kritisch durchgesehene Gesammtausgabe (in German). Leipzig: Breitkopf & Härtel. Reprints of several volumes by Kalmus and Dover Publications; Franz Schubert's Werke (Series I–XIX and XXI), Series XX, Revisionsbericht: Scores at the International Music Score Library Project
- Deutsch catalogue (D) = Schubert Thematic Catalogue:
  - Deutsch, Otto Erich; et al. (Donald R. Wakeling) (1951). Schubert: Thematic Catalogue of all his Works in Chronological Order (1st ed.). London: Dent. 1995 reprint, with errata correction: Deutsch, Otto Erich; et al. (Donald R. Wakeling) (1995). The Schubert Thematic Catalogue (Dover ed.). Mineola, N.Y.: Dover Publications. ISBN 0486286851.
  - Deutsch, Otto Erich (1978). Walther Dürr; Arnold Feil; Christa Landon [in German]; Werner Aderhold (eds.). Franz Schubert: Thematisches Verzeichnis seiner Werke in chronologischer Folge. New Schubert Edition (in German). Kassel: Bärenreiter. ISBN 9783761805718. ISMN 9790006305148.
    - Series VIII (Supplement)
    - Volume 4
- Hoboken catalogue (Hob.): "Joseph Haydn (1732–1809): Werke sortiert nach Hob (Hoboken-Verzeichnis, 1957-78)" (in German). Kaiserslautern: Klassika.
- Köchel catalogue (K.): "Wolfgang Amadeus Mozart (1756–1791): Werke sortiert nach KV^{6} (Köchel-Verzeichnis, 6. Auflage, 1964)" (in German). Kaiserslautern: Klassika.
- Neue Schubert-Ausgabe (NSA) = New Schubert Edition:
  - NSA scores: Schubert, Franz (1968–2019). International Schubert Association (Tübingen) (ed.). Franz Schubert (1797–1828): New Edition of the Complete Works (in German). Kassel: Bärenreiter. [over 80 volumes in eight series] Individual volumes:
    - NSA II, 15: Schubert, Franz; Neumann, Johann Philipp (2008). Jahrmärker, Manuela; Aigner, Thomas (eds.). Sacontala. New Schubert Edition (in German). Kassel: Bärenreiter. ISMN 9790006497294.
      - Series II (Stage Works), Vol. 15
    - NSA VIII, 4: See above Deutsch (1978)
  - NSA website: "New Schubert Edition". Tübingen: International Schubert Association.
- Schubert Online: "www.schubert-online.at: Schubert music manuscripts, first and early editions online". Vienna: Austrian Academy of Sciences (ÖAW).
- The LiederNet Archive: Ezust, Emily; et al. (LiederNet contributors). "Composer: Franz Peter Schubert (1797 - 1828)". Ontario: LiederNet Corporation.

Other

- Badura-Skoda, Eva; Branscombe, Peter, eds. (2008). Schubert Studies: Problems of Style and Chronology. Cambridge University Press. ISBN 0521088720.
  - Walther Dürr "Schubert's Songs and Their Poetry" pp. 1–24
  - Rufus Hallmark "Schubert's 'Auf dem Strom'" pp. 25–46
  - Elaine Brody "Schubert and Sulzer Revisited" pp. 47–60
  - Marius Flothuis "Schubert Revises Schubert" pp. 61–84
  - Elizabeth Norman McKay "Schubert as Composer of Operas" pp. 85–104
  - Peter Branscombe "Schubert and the Melodrama" pp. 105–142
  - Christoph Wolff "Schubert's 'Der Tod und dad Mädchen'" pp. 143–172
  - Peter Gülke on String Quintet D 956 pp. 173–186
  - Paul Badura-Skoda on Schubert's 'Great' C major Symphony pp. 187–208
  - Robert Winter "Paper Studies and the Future of Schubert Research" pp. 209–276
  - Eva Badura-Skoda "The Chronology of Schubert's Piano Trios" pp. 277–296
  - Reinhard Van Hoorickx "The Chronology of Schubert's Fragments and Sketches" pp. 297–326
  - Arnold Feil "Rhythm in Schubert" pp. 327–346
  - Alexander Weinmann on Leopold Puschl and Schubert's sojourn in Zseliz pp. 347–356
- Elsholz, Gunter (1982). Vogel, Reimut (ed.). Franz Schubert: Sinfonie in E-Dur 1825. Stuttgart: Goldoni. ISBN 3922044050. OCLC 987719669.
- Hilmar, Ernst; Jestremski, Margret, eds. (2004). Schubert-Enzyklopädie (in German). Vol. 1. Introduction by Alfred Brendel. Tutzing: Hans Schneider. ISBN 3795211557.
- Keefe, Simon P., ed. (2006). Mozart Studies. Cambridge University Press. ISBN 0521851025.
- Kube, Michael (2009). "Franz Schuberts Deutsche Trauermesse (D 621) als Problem der Text- und Stilkritik". In Mitterauer, Gertraud; Müller, Ulrich; Springeth, Margarete; Vitzthum, Verena (eds.). Was ist Textkritik?: Zur Geschichte und Relevanz eines Zentralbegriffs der Editionswissenschaft (in German). Walter de Gruyter. pp. 129–140. ISBN 3484970782.
- Mozart, Wolfgang Amadeus; Haydn, Joseph; Haydn, Michael (2008). Kircher, Armin (ed.). Chorbuch Mozart • Haydn VII: Kanonsammlung [Choral Collection Mozart • Haydn, Vol. VII: Canon Collection] (in German, Latin, English, and Italian). Stuttgart: Carus-Verlag. OCLC 274222567.
- Newbould, Brian (1999). Schubert: The Music and the Man. University of California Press. ISBN 0520219570.
- Reed, John (1997). The Schubert Song Companion. Manchester University Press. ISBN 1901341003.
- Van Hoorickx, Reinhard (1971). "Franz Schubert (1797–1828) List of the Dances in Chronological Order". Revue belge de Musicologie / Belgisch Tijdschrift voor Muziekwetenschap. 25 (1). Belgian Musicological Society: 68–97. doi:10.2307/3686180. ISSN 0771-6788. JSTOR 3686180.
- Van Hoorickx, Reinhard (1974–1976). "Thematic Catalogue of Schubert's Works: New Additions, Corrections and Notes". Revue belge de Musicologie / Belgisch Tijdschrift voor Muziekwetenschap. 28–30. Belgian Musicological Society: 136–171. doi:10.2307/3686053. ISSN 0771-6788. JSTOR 3686053.
