= Van der Poel =

Van der Poel is a Dutch toponymic surname meaning "from the pool" (though poel could occasionally indicate a swamp as well). Abroad the surname is often concatenated to "Vanderpoel". People with this surname include:

- Adri van der Poel (born 1959), Dutch racing cyclist
- David van der Poel (born 1992), Dutch cyclocross racer, son of Adri
- Egbert van der Poel (1621–1664), Dutch genre and landscape painter
- Jacques van der Poel (born 1963), Dutch racing cyclist
- Jean van der Poel (1904–1986), South African historian
- Mathieu van der Poel (born 1995), Dutch cyclocross racer, son of Adri
- Willem van der Poel (1926–2024), Dutch computer scientist
- Nils van der Poel (born 1996), Swedish speed skater

Vanderpoel

- Aaron Vanderpoel (1799–1870), U.S. Representative from New York
- Emily Noyes Vanderpoel (1842–1939), American artist, writer, and philanthropist.
- Isaac V. Vanderpoel (1814–1871), American lawyer and New York State Treasurer
- John Vanderpoel (1857–1911), Dutch-born American artist and teacher
- John W. Vanderpoel (born 1949), American birdwatcher, birding guide and author
- Kate Vanderpoel (1851–19??), pen name of American composer Cornelia Townsend
- Matilda Vanderpoel (1862–1950), American painter
- Waid Vanderpoel (1922–2003), American financier and conservationist

Van der Poele

- Georges Van Der Poele (fl. 1900), Belgian equestrian

Van de Poel

- Hein van de Poel (1915–1993), Dutch politician

Vandepoel

- Bart Vandepoel (born 1982), Belgian footballer

Van de Poele

- Eric van de Poele (born 1961), Belgian racing driver

Van Depoele

- Charles Joseph Van Depoele (1846–1892), Belgian-American electrical engineer and inventor

== See also ==
- Grand Prix Adri van der Poel a cyclo-cross race named after Adri van der Poel
- Poel (disambiguation)
- Poels, a related Dutch surname
