= Poel (disambiguation) =

Poel is a German island in the Baltic Sea.

Poel may also refer to:

- Gustav Poel (1917–2009), a German U-boat commander in World War II
- Jacobus Poel (1712–1775), a Dutch merchant in Russia and grand duke
- John Basil Poel (1881–1937), a District Chairman in the County of Essex, UK
- Piter Poel (1760–1837), a Russian diplomat and son of Jacobus Poel
- William Poel (1852–1934), an English actor, theatrical manager and dramatist

== See also ==
- MV Poel, a Kriegsmarine coastal tanker
- Poels, a Dutch toponymic surname
- Van der Poel, a Dutch toponymic surname
