= Caroline Rudolphi =

German educationist and poet

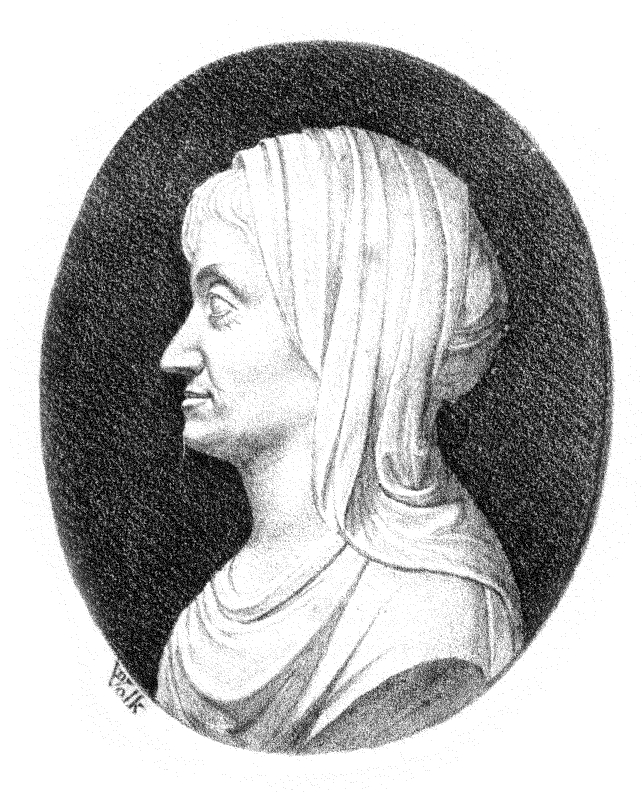
- Portrait from Schindel (1825)
- Born: August 24, 1753; Magdeburg, Prussia
- Died: April 15, 1811 (aged 57); Heidelberg, Baden
- Occupation: Female educationist
- Writing career
- Language: German
- Movements: Empfindsamkeit; Romanticism

Caroline Rudolphi (also Karoline; 1753–1811) was a German educationist and poet. Born to a poor family in Magdeburg and growing up in Potsdam (Margraviate of Brandenburg, Kingdom of Prussia), she was discovered by composer Johann Friedrich Reichardt, who in 1781 set to music and published a number of her poems. From 1778, Rudolphi served as educator to the daughters of the von Röpert family of Trollenhagen. In 1783, she opened her own educational institute at Trittau. Over the following years, Rudolphi became a widely known and respected educationist for girls. She became friends with Elise Reimarus, and at her institute she established a literary salon, attracting a circle of intellectuals such as Matthias Claudius, Friedrich Gottlieb Klopstock, Friedrich Heinrich Jacobi, Jens Baggesen.

Rudolphi moved her institute to Heidelberg in 1803 (in the newly formed Electorate of Baden), where she became socially involved with the circle of Romanticist intellectuals there (Achim von Arnim, Clemens Brentano, Sophie Mereau, Friedrich Creuzer Ludwig Tieck) and a close friend of the family of classicist Johann Heinrich Voß.

Rudolphi published collections of her poems in 1781, 1787 and 1796, and she published her principles on the education of girls in form of an epistolary novel, Gemälde weiblicher Erziehung (1807).

Her poem Ode an Gott ("Ode to God") was set to music by Johann Heinrich Tobler in 1825, and was sung as the unofficial cantonal anthem of the Swiss canton of Appenzell Ausserrhoden at the Landsgemeinde since 1877.

== Bibliography ==
- Gedichte von Karoline Christiane Louise Rudolphi. Hg. u. m. einigen Melod. begl. v. Johann Friederich Reichardt. Berlin 1781 (2nd ed. Wolfenbüttel 1787).
- Gedichte von Karoline Christiane Louise Rudolphi. Zweite Sammlung. Nebst einigen Melodien. ed. Joachim Heinrich Campe. Braunschweig 1787.
- Neue Sammlung von Gedichten von Caroline Rudolphi. Leipzig 1796.
- Der Karoline Rudolphi sämtliche Gedichte. 1805.
- Gemälde weiblicher Erziehung (1807, 2nd ed. 1815, 3rd ed. 1838, 4th ed. 1857), reprinted from the first (anonymous) publication in as Briefe über weibliche Erziehung. in:Journal für deutsche Frauen von deutschen Frauen geschrieben. (1805).
- Ist auch Freundschaft unter den Weibern? [as Helena S.]. In: Journal für deutsche Frauen von deutschen Frauen geschrieben. 1 (1805). [posthumously edited in Schriftlicher Nachlaß von Caroline Rudolphi. ed. Abraham Voß. Heidelberg 1835. 67-80.]
- Weiblichkeit. Ein Gespräch. [as Helena S. ] In: Journal für deutsche Frauen von deutschen Frauen geschrieben. 2 (1806).
