= Hohenkirchen =

- Municipality
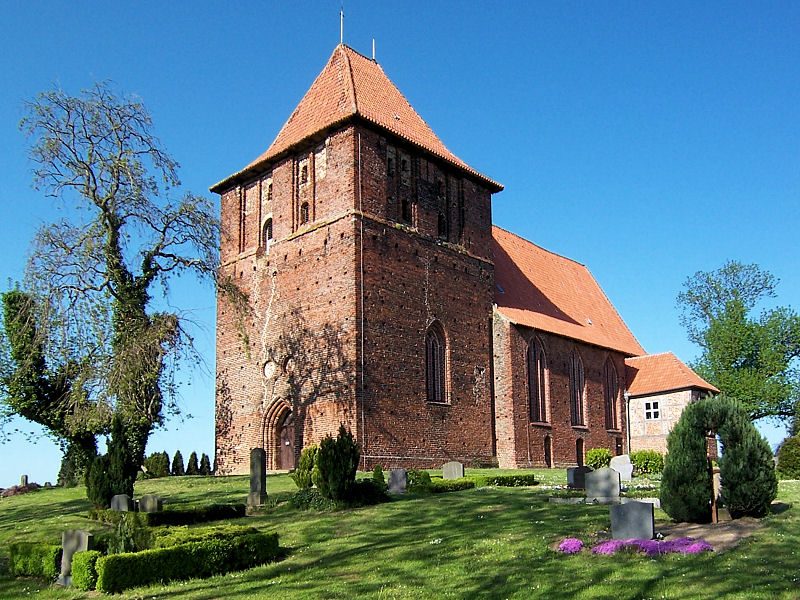
- Church

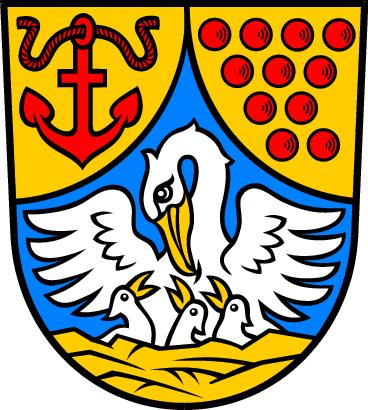
- Coat of arms

- Location of Hohenkirchen within Nordwestmecklenburg district
- Interactive map of Hohenkirchen
- Location within Germany Location within Mecklenburg-Vorpommern
- Coordinates: 53°55′N 11°19′E
- Country: Germany
- State: Mecklenburg-Vorpommern
- District: Nordwestmecklenburg
- Municipal assoc.: Klützer Winkel

Government
  - Mayor: Jan van Leeuwen

Area
  - Total: 41.09 km^{2} (15.86 sq mi)
- Elevation: 33 m (108 ft)

Population (2025-12-31)
  - Total: 1,008
  - Density: 24.53/km^{2} (63.54/sq mi)
- Time zone: UTC+01:00 (CET)
  - Summer (DST): UTC+02:00 (CEST)
- Postal codes: 23968
- Dialling codes: 038428
- Vehicle registration: NWM, GDB, GVM, WIS
- Website: www.kluetzer-winkel.de

Hohenkirchen (German pronunciation: [hoːənˈkɪʁçn̩]) is a municipality in the north of district Nordwestmecklenburg in Mecklenburg-Vorpommern (Germany). It is administered by the Klützer Winkel (Amt) located in the city of Klütz.
