= August Adolph von Hennings =

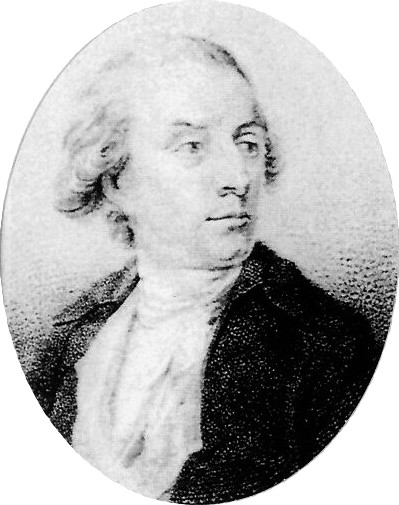
August Adolph von Hennings; painting by Jens Juel, 1780.

August Adolph von Hennings (19 July 1746, Pinneberg – 17 May 1826, Rantzau) was a politician, publicist and writer of the Age of Enlightenment, born in the Duchy of Holstein to a family of lawyers. Active in Denmark and the German states, he was known as the "true apostle of the Enlightenment to the dukedoms" His elder sister Sophia (1742–1817) married the physician Johann Albert Heinrich Reimarus.
