= Kalkhorst =

- Municipality
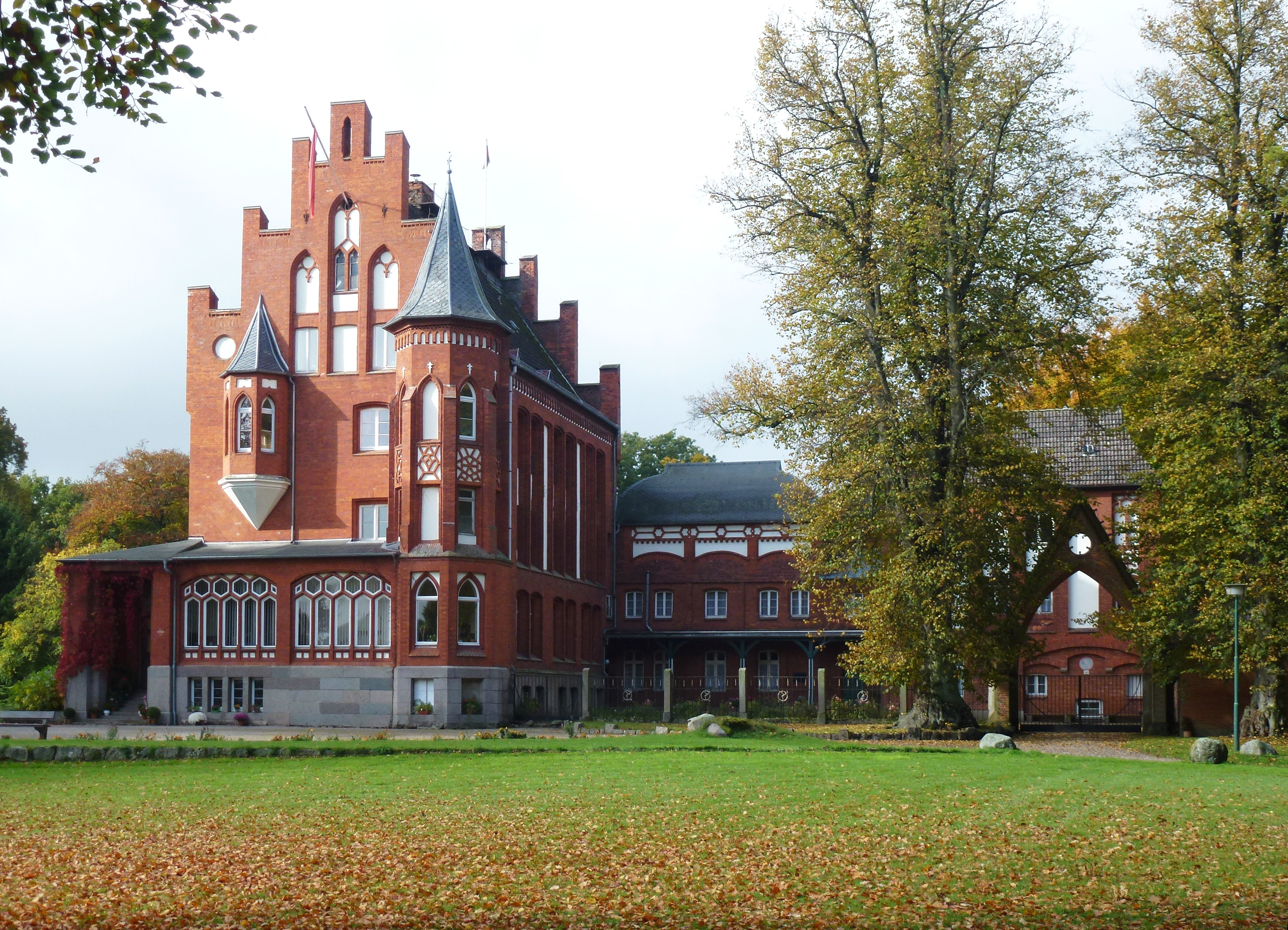
- Schloss Kalkhorst in Halkhorst

- Coat of arms

- Location of Kalkhorst within Nordwestmecklenburg district
- Interactive map of Kalkhorst
- Location within Germany Location within Mecklenburg-Vorpommern
- Coordinates: 53°58′N 11°04′E
- Country: Germany
- State: Mecklenburg-Vorpommern
- District: Nordwestmecklenburg
- Municipal assoc.: Klützer Winkel

Government
  - Mayor: Dietrich Neick

Area
  - Total: 51.91 km^{2} (20.04 sq mi)
- Elevation: 68 m (223 ft)

Population (2025-12-31)
  - Total: 1,701
  - Density: 32.77/km^{2} (84.87/sq mi)
- Time zone: UTC+01:00 (CET)
  - Summer (DST): UTC+02:00 (CEST)
- Postal codes: 23942, 23948
- Dialling codes: 038825, 038827
- Vehicle registration: NWM
- Website: www.gemeinde-kalkhorst.de

Kalkhorst is a municipality in the Nordwestmecklenburg district, in Mecklenburg-Vorpommern, Germany.

It is close to the cities of Lübeck, Wismar and Schwerin and is part of the Hamburg Metropolitan Region.
