= Klützer Winkel (Amt) =

Amt in Nordwestmecklenburg, Germany

- Amt
- Map of Nordwestmecklenburg highlighting Klützer Winkel
- Interactive map of Klützer Winkel
- Location within Germany Location within Mecklenburg-Vorpommern
- Coordinates: 53°55′N 11°09′E
- Country: Germany
- State: Mecklenburg-Vorpommern
- District: Nordwestmecklenburg
- Seat: Klütz
- Subdivisions: 6 municipalities

Area
  - Total: 204.53 km^{2} (78.97 sq mi)

Population (2025-12-31)
  - Total: 10,231
  - Density: 50.022/km^{2} (129.56/sq mi)
- Time zone: UTC+01:00 (CET)
  - Summer (DST): UTC+02:00 (CEST)
- Website: www.kluetzer-winkel.de

Klützer Winkel is an Amt in the district of Nordwestmecklenburg, in Mecklenburg-Vorpommern, Germany. The seat of the Amt is in Klütz.

The Amt Klützer Winkel consists of the following municipalities:

1. Boltenhagen
2. Damshagen
3. Hohenkirchen
4. Kalkhorst
5. Klütz
6. Zierow
