= Jacobus Poel =

Jacobus "Jan" Poel (1712-1775) was a Dutch-born merchant in Saint Petersburg and Arkhangelsk. He was also a grand duke and commercial legate at the Russian court. However, in July 1762 his friend, the Czar Peter III, was assassinated in connection with a successful power-grab involving his estranged wife. Poel hurriedly left Saint Petersburg and relocated to Hamburg, dividing his final years between the Hanseatic City and the several landed estates he acquired in northern Germany.

== Life ==
=== Family provenance and childhood ===
Jan Poel is believed to have been born in the Netherlands. Neither the precise date nor the place of his birth have been confirmed, however. Both his family traditions and his own education prepared him for an itinerant life.

Jan grew up in Leiden, living for some time with a Monsieur Luzac, the French born proprietor of a francophone Leiden Newspaper. He received a good education, mastering various European languages and becoming fluent in Dutch, Russian and German.

=== Merchant ===
Jan Poel learned his mercantile skills working in Saint Petersburg with the "van Brienen" firm, of which he later became a part-owner. One source mentions that in 1742 he was working as a book keeper for Caspar Bokman, a merchant originally from Hamburg and another member of the western merchant community which had been a prominent feature of the Russian capital since the time of Peter the Great. A characteristic of the western expatriate community was a propensity to cement business relationships through marriage, and at some point between 1750 and 1752 Jan married, as his second wife, Magdalena van Brienen, a daughter of Rutger van Brienen and sister to another member of the merchant community, Abraham van Brienen. His first marriage had produced two children, and by his marriage to Magdalena he fathered a further five, including Magdalena (later Magdalena Pauli), remembered primarily as a socially prominent philanthropist, and Piter, remembered primarily as a diplomat.

As he progressed in the business Jan took on a branch of the "van Brienen" firm in Arkhangelsk to the north, where he amassed a substantial fortune.

=== Palace coup ===
Back in Saint Petersburg, the Grand Duke Peter, who since 1739 had included the dukedom of Holstein-Gottorp among his titles, became the Godfather of Jan's son Piter, born in 1760. The Grand Duke Peter was also next in line to become the Russian czar, and throughout the later 1750s it was apparent that the health of the Empress Elizabeth was in terminal decline. As her death approached Peter mandated Jan Poel to become his effective viceroy in Holstein-Gottorp. Of particular concern to the future czar was a major canal building project which would call for close oversight. Poel prepared to relocate to Holstein, liquidating his assets in Saint Petersburg in preparation for the move. The czar came to the throne in January 1762, but his assassination six months later called for a rapid change of plan. Czar Peter was succeeded by his estranged widow, remembered by history as Catherine the Great, but she had very little interest in Holstein-Gottorp, and for several years the legal status of the duchy would remain unclear. Jan Poel no longer saw a future for himself in Holstein-Gottorp, but there was a pressing need to relocate, and supported by the considerable wealth that he had accumulated he now moved with his family to Hamburg.

=== Rich land owner ===
In 1766 Jan Poel purchased a number of farm-estates in Mecklenburg. Two of these, both near Wismar, were at Zierow and at Naudin (today a quarter in Bobitz). Further to the west, in Holstein, he also purchased estates at Rethwisch, in the district of Stormarn, and at Rastorf. During his final years he tended to spend his summers in Zierow and his winters in Hamburg, where he lived in some style, creating a stir with his large four-horse carriage.

Already twice widowed, on 6 August 1767 he married for a third time. The ceremony took place in the chapel of the German Reformed Church in Hamburg. His third bride was the widow Judith Sarry (born Judith Schreur van Hoghenstein). This marriage was childless, and Judith died in February 1769. Jacobus "Jan" Poel himself died at Zierow in the late summer of 1775. He was buried on 25 September 1775 at Proseken (today a quarter of Gägelow, a short distance to the west of Wismar).
