= Johann Diederich Gries =

German poet and socialite

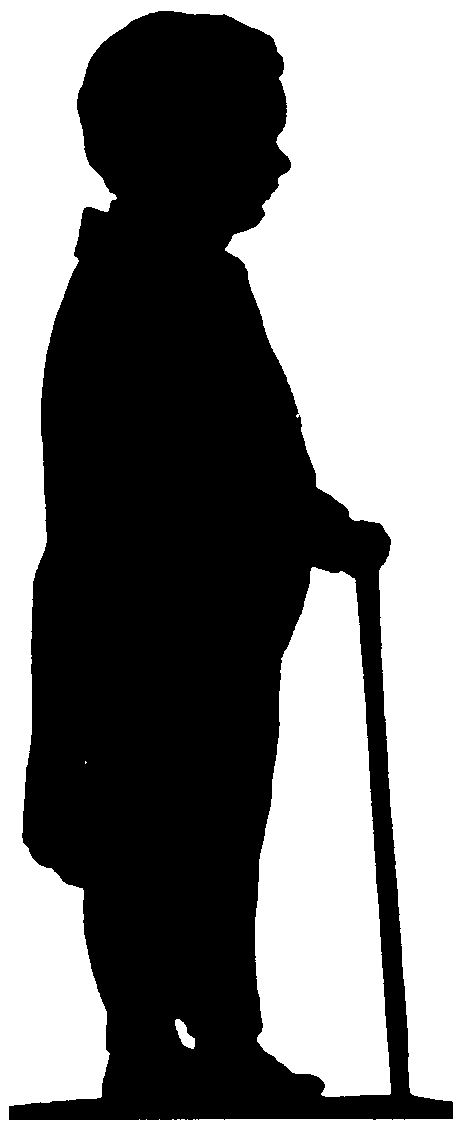
Paper-cutout silhouette by Christian Duttenhofer (1778-1846)

Johann Diederich Gries (7 February 1775, Hamburg – 9 February 1842, Hamburg) was a German poet and socialite during the Romantic period. His extensive list of friends and acquaintances included Goethe and Schiller. Viewed through the prism of intervening years, his most enduring contribution is as a translator.

== Life ==
Johann Diederich Gries was born into a prosperous Hamburg family, the fourth of his parents' seven recorded sons. Franz Lorenz Gries (1731-1803), his father, was a merchant and city senator. His mother Johanna also came from a mercantile background. He undertook an apprenticeship in business with a Hamburg wholesale merchant for three years between 1793 and 1795 which, he let it be known, was a miserable thing to have to do. After his elder brother Ludwig had intervened with their father on his behalf he was permitted to embark on a period of study in Law, enrolling at the University of Jena in October 1795. At Jena his naturally affability, his abundance of inoffensive humour and his exceptional talent as a piano player all combined to gain him ready access to the homes and social circles of the professors. He also acquired an extensive network of lifelong friend among his student contemporaries, such as Johann Georg Rist, Johann Friedrich Herbart, August von Herder, also including a couple of years later Georg Arnold Heise, August Ludwig Hülsen and Heinrich Kunhardt. At the home of the anatomist Justus Christian Loder he got to know Goethe and Schiller, Herder and Fichte. It was nevertheless striking that while his literary awareness and social circle developed rapidly, he approached his studies in jurisprudence with a marked absence of diligence. Early in 1797 he returned to Hamburg for a visit during which he renewed his friendship with Johann Albert Heinrich Reimarus and Friedrich Heinrich Jacobi. That summer he accompanied Caroline Schlegel and her daughter to Dresden where Schlegel was staying. That also gave him the opportunity to meet Schelling by whom he was much impressed. Around this time he also visited Freiberg where he was warmly received by Johann Friedrich Wilhelm von Charpentier.

His own first published poems were enthusiastically received when they appeared in the Schiller's Musenalmanach and in Wieland's Teutsche Merkur.

In April 1799, after seven or eight terms, a faced serious warnings from his father about his perceived failure to engage seriously in his legal studies, and was obliged, with a heavy heart, to leave Jena. He completed his degree in Göttingen and obtained his doctorate of laws in 1800, his doctoral dissertation being entitled "De litt. cambialium acceptione". In Hamburg a serious family meeting about the future now took place. Two of his brothers were already qualified and working as Hamburg lawyers while a third was a Hamburg Syndic. There seems to have been an acceptance on the part of their father that his fourth son, Diederich, was destined for a literary future rather than a life in the law. A meeting in 1798 with "Novalis" and other representatives of the Romantic movement had persuaded him that this should be the direction of his own literary future. During the next three and a half decades he continued to take frequent lengthy trips, socialising with the luminaries of the age, and supporting himself - at times barely - through his own writing and through translation into German of (primarily) Italian and Spanish language literature, returning to his beloved Jena every few years. He based himself with Johann Heinrich Voss in Heidelberg between 1806 and 1808, during which time his circle included Clemens Brentano, Josephvon Eichendorff and Wolf von Baudissin. Between 1824 and 1827 he lived in Stuttgart, where friends included Gustav Schwab and Ludwig Uhland.

During the early 1830s he was affected deeply by the deaths of various friends, including, in 1832, Goethe himself. In April 1831 Gries was laid low by gout, an inherited family affliction. This affected his grip so that he was no longer able to play card games or write without some difficulty. Meanwhile, sources speculate that he had, by this stage, probably exhausted his inherited wealth. Relatives in Hamburg became concerned and repeatedly urged him not to return to live there. However, in 1837 his youngest brother, Franz and his energetic wife took him into their Hamburg home, where Diederich was able to complete his translation of "Bojardos Verliebter Roland".

His death in February 1842 came after several years of debilitating illness, but he was spared from the traumatic experience of the great fire which destroyed much of Hamburg three months later.

== Evaluation ==
During his lifetime Gries certainly published several of his own poems, but they never really rose above a certain level of mediocrity. He himself was conscious of his limited talent in this respect, and insisted that he would "rather provide good translations than mediocre originals". As a translator he excelled, providing German language readers with artistically primed translations that were true to the original texts of well known foreign language texts, which remain of value two centuries later.

== Works ==
- Torquato Tassos Befreites Jerusalem, 1800–1803
- Ariosts Rasender Roland, 1804–1808; newly reworked edition: Lodovico Ariosto's Rasender Roland, 5 volumes, Jena 1827–1828
- Calderon's Plays, 1815–1826
- Bojardos Verliebter Roland, 1835–1837
