= Damshagen =

- Municipality
- Location of Damshagen within Nordwestmecklenburg district
- Interactive map of Damshagen
- Location within Germany Location within Mecklenburg-Vorpommern
- Coordinates: 53°55′N 11°09′E
- Country: Germany
- State: Mecklenburg-Vorpommern
- District: Nordwestmecklenburg
- Municipal assoc.: Klützer Winkel

Government
  - Mayor: Willi Heidmann

Area
  - Total: 38.43 km^{2} (14.84 sq mi)
- Elevation: 14 m (46 ft)

Population (2025-12-31)
  - Total: 1,330
  - Density: 34.6/km^{2} (89.6/sq mi)
- Time zone: UTC+01:00 (CET)
  - Summer (DST): UTC+02:00 (CEST)
- Postal codes: 23948
- Dialling codes: 038825
- Vehicle registration: NWM
- Website: www.damshagen.info

Damshagen is a municipality in the Nordwestmecklenburg district, in Mecklenburg-Vorpommern, Germany.
