= Johann Joachim Faber =

German painter

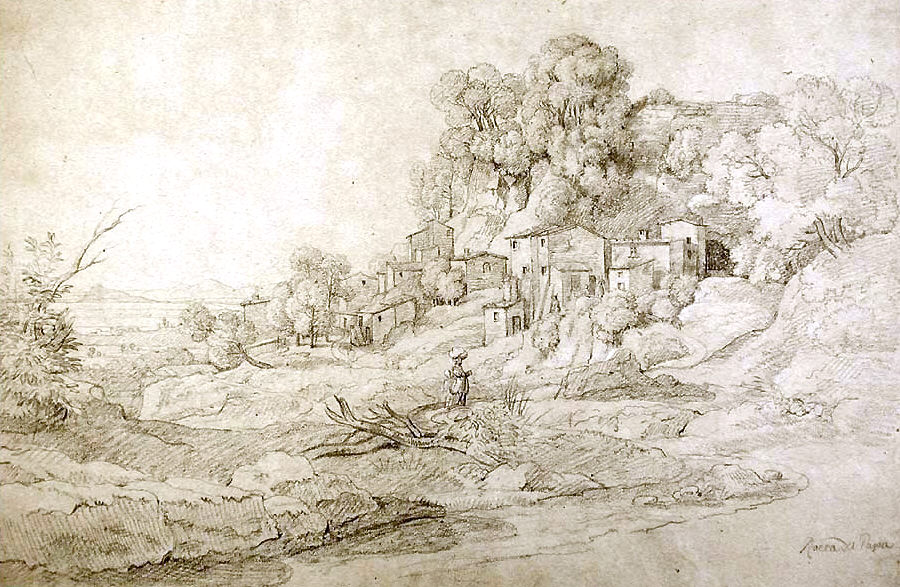
Rocca di Papa

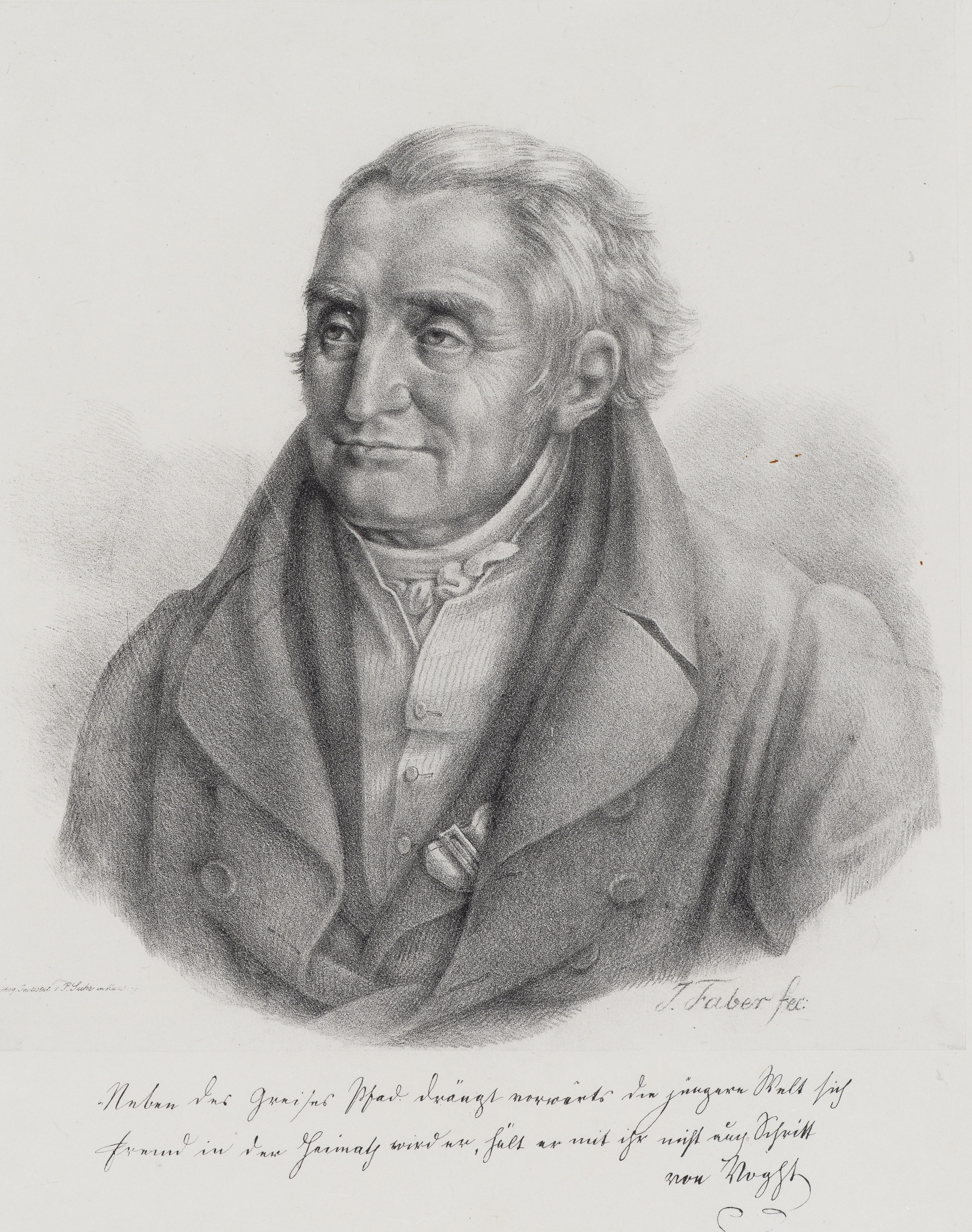
Caspar Voght

Johann Joachim Faber (12 April 1778 – 2 August 1846) was a landscape painter who was born in Hamburg. He worked originally at historical subjects, and painted the altar-piece, Suffer Little Children to come unto Me, for St. Catharine's Church at Hamburg. On his journey to Italy in company with J. A. Koch and Reinhardt, he was induced to adopt landscape painting, in which line he is best known. The Berlin Gallery contains a View of the Capuchin Monastery, near Naples by him (1830). He died in Hamburg in 1846.

== See also ==
- List of German painters
