= Poels =

Poels is a Dutch toponymic surname, originally referring to a location near a pool or small lake. People with this name include:

- Jack Poels (born 1957), Dutch singer, guitarist and harmonica player
- Marijn Poels (born 1975), Dutch documentary filmmaker and international speaker
- Pat Poels (born c. 1968), American professional poker player
- Roy Poels (born 1972), Dutch judoka
- Twan Poels (born 1963), Dutch road bicycle racer
- Wout Poels (born 1987), Dutch road bicycle racer

== See also ==
- Poel (disambiguation)
