= Johann Georg Rist =

Danish author, diplomat and statesman

- Born: 23 November 1775; Niendorf near Altona, Duchy of Holstein
- Died: 5 February 1847 (aged 71); Schleswig, Duchy of Schleswig
- Education: Jena University; Kiel University
- Occupations: Diplomat; Chargé d'affaires Writer; Statesman
- Spouse: Emilie (Emmy) Hanbury
- Children: 6

Johann Georg Rist (German: [ʁɪst]; 23 November 1775 – 5 February 1847) was a Danish author, diplomat and statesman, originally from Holstein.

== Life ==
Johann Georg Rist was born in Niendorf, at that time a prosperous village on the edge of Altona in the Duchy of Holstein, and today a quarter in Hamburg. His father was the minister-preacher at the Lutheran Niendorf Market Church, Johann Christoph Friedrich Rist (1735–1807). They were both directly descended from the poet-dramatist Johann Rist (1607–1667).

Rist received his education at home from his father until 1794 when for a year he attended the prestigious Johanneum school in Hamburg. In the Easter term of 1795 he moved to the University of Jena where he studied Law and where contemporaries whom he got to know included Johann Erich von Berger, Johann Diederich Gries and Johann Friedrich Herbart. He also found time for frequent visits to the theatre in nearby Weimar, where he often encountered Goethe, already a celebrity, who made a great impression on Rist. An entry to the home of Schiller (who by this time was unwell and keeping out of the limelight) was also negotiated through well placed mutual acquaintances.

After just a year, in 1796 Rist moved on from Jena to the University of Kiel where he pursued his studies and his networking. Those whose lectures he attended included August Christian Niemann and Dietrich Hermann Hegewisch. Like-minded new friends included Henrik Steffens. In 1797, invited by another of his student friends, he visited Copenhagen where he made the acquaintance of the Danish Finance Minister, Ernst Heinrich von Schimmelmann. This led to an appointment as von Schimmelmann's private secretary, a post he retained till 1801. It is not clear that he ever graduated with a university degree.

At this time, to the frustration of more enthusiastic belligerent nations, Denmark and Russia were both navigating a path through the shifting alliances of the Napoleonic Wars based on armed neutrality, as a result of which they were allied with each other. In 1801 Rist joined the Danish diplomatic service as legation secretary to Saint Petersburg. His next posting was to the Madrid embassy where he remained till 1806. In 1804 he was appointed chargé d'affaires, which in the absence of an ambassador made him Denmark's senior diplomatic representative.

In 1806 he was transferred to London, again as the Danish chargé d'affaires. His time in charge was dominated by a diplomatic breach between Denmark and the newly launched United Kingdom after British naval commanders, fearful that the Danish fleet might fall into French hands, bombarded Copenhagen and seized the Danish fleet. In Denmark Rist was blamed for not having foreseen or averted the development, and by 1808 he had left London. In that year he was sent as commercial attaché (in some sources identified as General Commissar and General Consul) to Hamburg, a potentially profitable posting, but also a difficult one in the middle of a major war.

The complexities of the French occupation enforced his resignation in 1813 which was also the year of his marriage. He relocated briefly to Hadersleben in the Duchy of Schleswig (for many purposes by now part of Denmark). Moving south in 1814, he became a member of the Kiel-based "Commission for the re-occupation of the principalities of Schleswig and Holstein" ("Kommission zur Wiederbesitzergreifung der Herzogtümer Schleswig und Holstein"). With the defeat of Napoleon he was then appointed to a Danish government position in Paris. However, the situation in France was far from stable, and in 1815 Rist was back in Hamburg. In 1828 he relocated to Altona in Holstein which, though close in terms of geography, was politically very separate from Hamburg which had recovered and then built on much of its traditional autonomy after 1815. His youngest son died young, but both the elder two attended school in Altona.

When a regional government for Schleswig-Holstein was established in Schleswig on 1 October 1834, Rist became First Councillor, a position he would retain till 7 September 1846. However when, in the context of growing ethnically fueled separatism, the king placed Ludvig Nicolaus von Scheele in charge of the government, widespread dissatisfaction ensued, and in 1846 Rist was one of six senior government ministers who fell into disgrace and were dismissed from office. The government structure itself lasted only another five years, after which, in 1852, separate ministries were created for Schleswig and for Holstein.

== Personal ==
On 13 July 1813 Rist was married to Emilie "Emmy" Hanbury (1793–1859), a younger daughter of the British consul in Hamburg, William Hanbury (1755–1798). The marriage produced three recorded sons and three recorded daughters. Five of the six grew to adulthood.
