= Johann Heinrich Tobler =

Swiss singer and composer

Johann Heinrich Tobler (1777–1838) was a Swiss singer and composer of Appenzell Ausserrhoden, active in the formative period of Switzerland as a federal state. Born in Trogen as the son of a butcher, he worked as Modelstecher (craftsman of artistic wooden Lebkuchen templates) in Speicher from 1792, from 1798 also as secretary to the local authorities. He married Ursula Lerchenmeyer in 1803, and Anna Katharina Lindenmann in 1820.

He was a musical autodidact and became known as a composer and editor of song collections, a publicist and a poet. One of his compositions is Herrlich Leben strömt aus Dir.

In 1823, he was co-founder of the first cantonal fire insurance. He founded a literary association in 1820, in which he presided from 1825-27 and 1835–37, and in 1824 he founded the cantonal choir (Sängerverein).

In 1813, he also published a treatise of the early modern history of his home canton since partition from Appenzell Innerrhoden in 1597.

== Bibliography ==
- Lieder im gesellschaftlichen Kreise zu singen, 1807 (extended ed. 1828).
- Kurze Regenten- und Landesgeschichte des Kanton Appenzell der äusseren Rhoden, inner den Jahren 1597 bis 1797, 1813
- Landsgemeinde-Lieder, 1835
- Zwölf Lieder für vier Männerstimmen, 1837
