= Zierow =

- Municipality
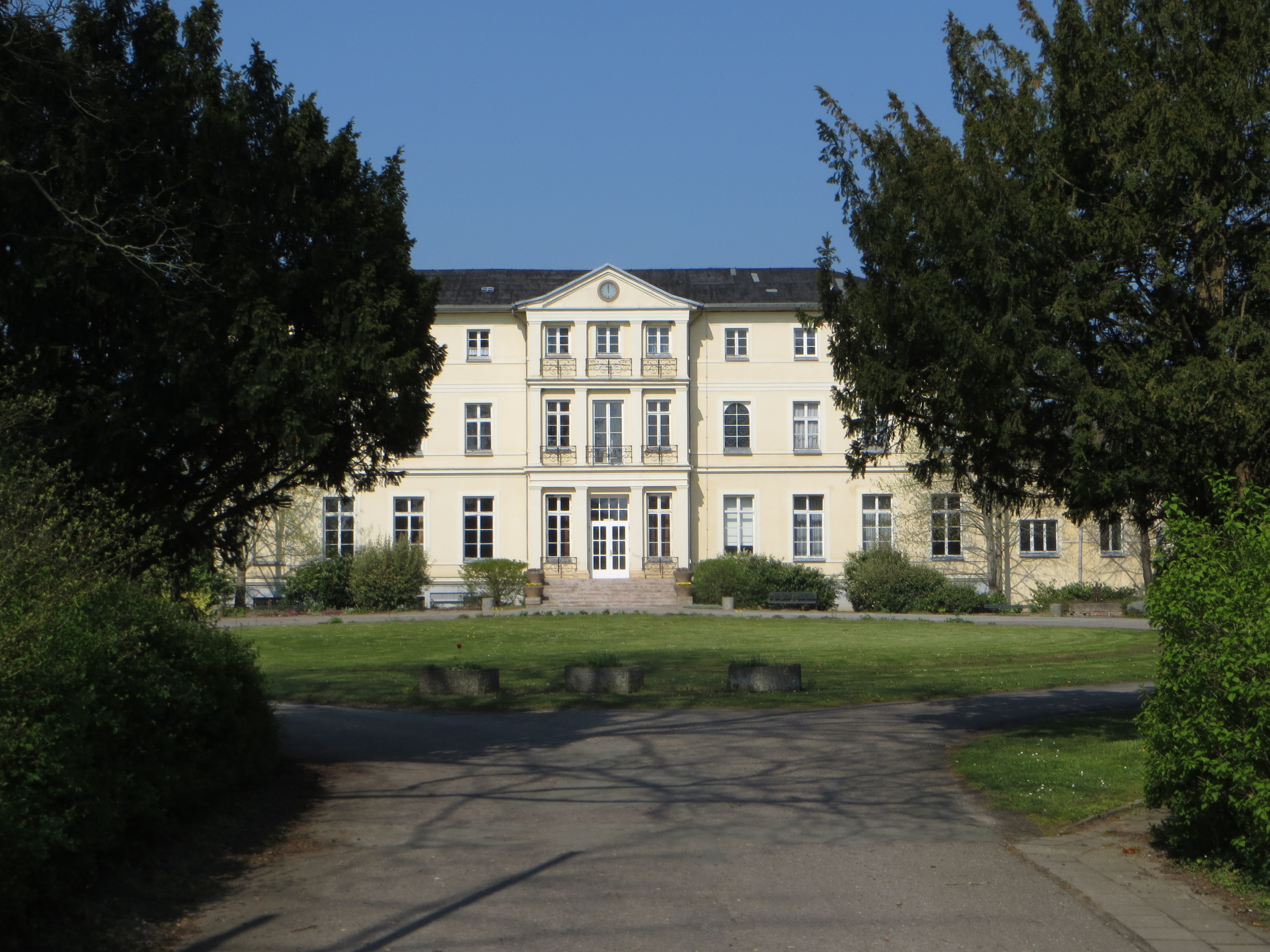
- Zierow Manor in Zierow

- Coat of arms

- Location of Zierow within Nordwestmecklenburg district
- Interactive map of Zierow
- Location within Germany Location within Mecklenburg-Vorpommern
- Coordinates: 53°55′37″N 11°22′29″E
- Country: Germany
- State: Mecklenburg-Vorpommern
- District: Nordwestmecklenburg
- Municipal assoc.: Klützer Winkel

Government
  - Mayor: Sylvia Höhne

Area
  - Total: 10.09 km^{2} (3.90 sq mi)
- Elevation: 7 m (23 ft)

Population (2025-12-31)
  - Total: 745
  - Density: 73.8/km^{2} (191/sq mi)
- Time zone: UTC+01:00 (CET)
  - Summer (DST): UTC+02:00 (CEST)
- Postal codes: 23968
- Dialling codes: 038428
- Vehicle registration: NWM
- Website: www.kluetzer-winkel.de

Zierow is a municipality in the Nordwestmecklenburg district, in Mecklenburg-Vorpommern, Germany.
