= Symphony, D 615 (Schubert) =

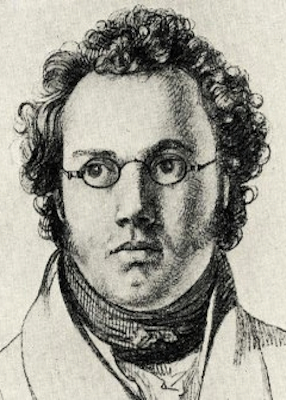
1821 drawing of Franz Schubert by Josef Kupelwieser

Schubert's Symphony in D major, D 615, is an unfinished work that survives in an incomplete four-page, 259-bar sketch written for piano solo. It is one of Schubert's six unfinished symphonies. It was begun in May 1818, with initial sketches made for the opening sections of the first movement and finale. He abandoned this symphony after this initial phase of work and never returned to it, probably due to dissatisfaction with it, although Schubert would live for another ten years. Although conductor and composer Brian Newbould has made a performing version of the fragments, a full completion has not yet been attempted.

== History ==
=== Composition ===
This sketch is the first of a series of four unfinished symphonies – D 615, D 708A, D 729 (the seventh), and D 759 (the eighth) – that are milestones in Schubert's symphonic development between the sixth and ninth symphonies. These four symphonies are in varying states of completion: D 615 has incomplete sketches of only two movements (the allegro and the finale), D 708A has incomplete sketches of all four movements, D 729 is structurally complete but was not fully orchestrated, and D 759 has the first two movements complete and orchestrated and a third movement in an incomplete piano sketch. Previously, his fourth symphony had had Beethovenian influence (although it is more reminiscent of the earlier Sturm und Drang movement), his fifth Mozartian influence, and his sixth Rossinian influence (Schubert had listened to Rossini's music before writing his sixth symphony and was extremely impressed, then incorporating aspects of Rossini's style into his music).

After writing the sixth symphony, Schubert experienced a crisis in his symphonic output, as he was not sure about whether he should continue on the path he was on in the sixth symphony of being influenced by Rossini. There is thus some Beethovenian influence present, which would persist throughout his symphonic output, but Schubert soon creates his own style and explores new territory. Additionally, he was still learning how to master instrumental writing, despite having done so for vocal works some years before. His mastery of songwriting was helped by the fact that the words gave hints as to the structure he would use, help that could not come in instrumental writing. This can be seen from the fact that Schubert had written his first six symphonies directly into full orchestral score, without sketching for piano beforehand, but D 615 and D 708A only survive as sketches in piano score. He returned to writing directly into orchestral score for his seventh symphony, although piano sketches exist for the eighth. These four unfinished symphonies thus show how Schubert was, as he stated in a letter from the mid-1820s, preoccupied with "planning a path to [write] a grand symphony [plans he would realize in the ninth symphony]", with his string quartets, octet and these unfinished symphonies as intermediate steps in this plan. The unusually large number of unfinished symphonies on the way to the ninth from the sixth show how preoccupied he was with writing this great symphony, and how important this plan was to him.

=== Discovery ===
In the mid-20th century, Dr. Ernst Hilmar discovered in a library in Vienna (the Wienbibliothek im Rathaus) a folio containing works by Schubert, titled "Sinfonie" and dated to May 1818. It contained sketches for nine movements, all in D major or related keys. In 1951, Otto Erich Deutsch assumed in the first edition of his catalogue of Schubert's works that all the material was for one symphony, which he labelled D 615. However, stylistic evidence shows that the material could not all have been for one symphony, notwithstanding the fact that there was simply too much material to serve for one symphony. In fact the folio was labelled "Zwei Symphonien in D" ("Two Symphonies in D"), indicating that a librarian had previously thought along similar lines around 1900. A 1978 analysis of watermarks and handwriting proved that there was really three symphonies present: these were D 615 (2 movements, written 1818), D 708A (4 movements, written 1821), and D 936A (3 movements, written 1828; commonly referred to as Schubert's tenth symphony). These separate Deutsch numbers were given in the 1978 second edition of the Deutsch catalogue.

As the sketches for D 615 were much more fragmentary than those for D 936A, Brian Newbould did not attempt to complete D 615 when he worked on completing Schubert's seventh, eighth and tenth symphonies in the 1990s, although he did orchestrate the existing fragments. Furthermore, being still more fragmentary than D 708A, it still remained incomplete when Newbould completed the D 708A symphony in 2012 for a commission from BBC Radio 3.

== Movements ==
The two movements are:

1. Adagio, – Allegro moderato,
2. [Allegretto], 2/4

== Extant material of every movement ==
The sketches are written on two staves, with voice leading, and harmonies ranging from complete to partly indicated. The manuscript contains five instrumental indications, confirming that the intended orchestra was similar in size to the sixth symphony, without trombones (that would become part of the Schubertian orchestra only in the seventh and later symphonies). Conforming to this symphony still being firmly in the Classical style, this orchestra was the same as that employed in the symphonies of the Viennese masters Haydn, Mozart, and the first two symphonies of Ludwig van Beethoven. The sketches total about 7 minutes of music. The middle movements were probably never written, as the sketch for the finale begins on the same page as the end of the sketch for the opening movement.

=== I. Adagio – Allegro moderato ===
Beginning of slow introduction

First theme

Like most of Schubert's early symphonies, this symphony opens with a slow introduction, which is cast in the key of D minor. Its beginning is somewhat reminiscent of the slow introduction to Haydn's 104th symphony, but it quickly moves into harmonically more remote territory, going as far as the tritone-related key of A♭ major. This moves into a conventional sonata-form movement in D major, with a transition making heavy use of triplets with the second theme in the dominant key of A major, but the sketch terminates at the end of the exposition. Near the end of the exposition, cadences in C major are alternated with those in A major. Brian Newbould sees a falling off of quality during the exposition, saying that "despite some promising ideas it runs out of wind before Schubert rests his pen".

=== II. [Allegretto] ===
Rondo theme

Although Maurice J. E. Brown took this to be a slow movement, Newbould interprets it to be almost certainly a finale, as it is in the tonic key of the symphony. It is in rondo form, the first of Schubert's symphonic finales to be in this form, but breaks off during the second statement of the theme. Newbould comments that "the finale is no less attractive [than the first movement], but perhaps Schubert in the end did not consider its prettiness and tendency to a loose balletic build as the right way forward for a maturing symphonist."
