= Elise Reimarus =

German scholar (1735–1805)

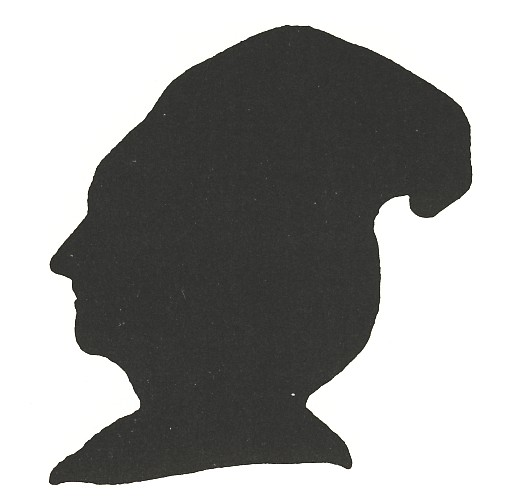
Elise Reimarus

Elise Reimarus (22 January 1735, Hamburg, as Margaretha Elisabeth Reimarus – 2 September 1805, Hamburg) was a German writer, educator, translator and salon-holder. She was the sister of Johann Albert Heinrich Reimarus and the daughter of Hermann Samuel Reimarus.

Elise Reimarus was known as one of the most erudite women of Hamburg and she was in epistolary contact with notable intellectuals of her time, including Moses Mendelssohn, Gotthold Ephraim Lessing, Friedrich Heinrich Jacobi, Carl Leonhard Reinhold. She was also a personal friend of fellow-educationist Caroline Rudolphi.

Reimarus published translations from the English and French, besides a number of original works. For some time she presided over the Reimarus family's literary salon, one of the precursors of the fashion of such salons in German Romanticism. Despite receiving numerous proposals, she remained unmarried.
