= Bart Vandepoel =

Belgian footballer

Personal information
- Full name: Bart Vandepoel
- Date of birth: 30 March 1982 (age 44)
- Place of birth: Belgium
- Position: Defender

Team information
- Current team: Herk-de-Stad FC

Senior career*
Years	Team	Apps	(Gls)
2001–2003	Standard Liège		
2003–2004	KV Mechelen		
2004–2013	Excelsior Veldwezelt		
2013–2015	Herk-de-Stad FC		
- * Club domestic league appearances and goals

Bart Vandepoel (born 30 March 1982) is a retired Belgian footballer who finished his career with Herk-de-Stad FC.
