= Caspar Voght =

German businessman (1752–1839)

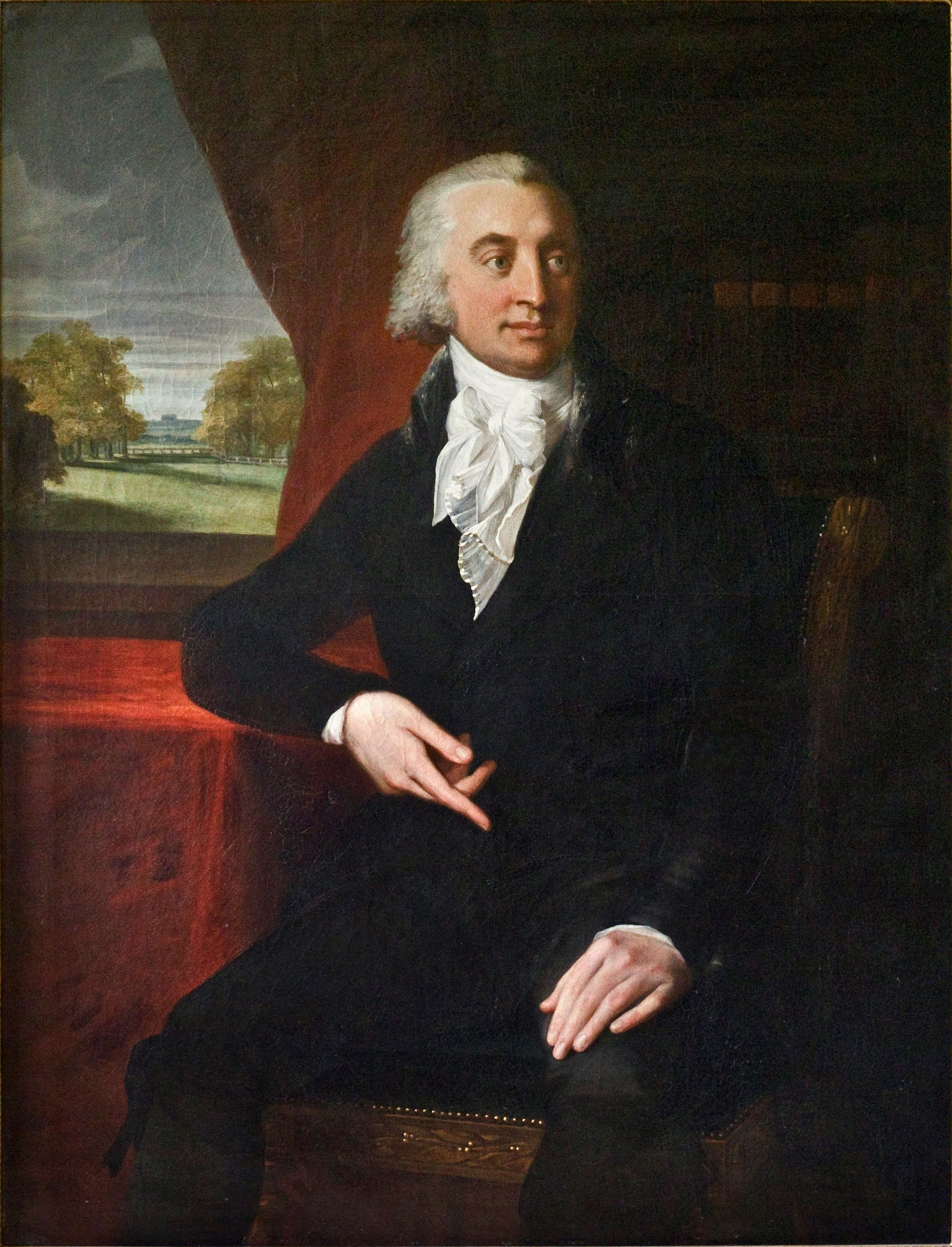
- Caspar Voght: painting by Jean-Laurent Mosnier, 1801
- Born: Caspar Voght; November 17, 1752; Hamburg, Holy Roman Empire
- Died: March 20, 1839 (aged 86); Hamburg, German Confederation
- Other names: Caspar Reichsfreiherr von Voght; Baron Caspar von Voght
- Occupation: Merchant
- Known for: Social reform

Caspar Voght (17 November 1752 – 20 March 1839), later Caspar Reichsfreiherr von Voght (more commonly known as Baron Caspar von Voght), was a German merchant and social reformer from Hamburg (today Germany). Together with his business partner and friend Georg Heinrich Sieveking he led one of the largest trading firms in Hamburg during the second half of the 18th Century. On numerous trade trips, he completely crossed the European continent. One of his greatest achievements was reforming the welfare system of Hamburg. From 1785 he dedicated himself to strengthening agricultural and horticultural projects and built a model agricultural community in Flottbek, close to the gates of Hamburg.

== Life and work ==
=== Background, youth and 'Grand Tour' of Europe ===
Caspar Voght was born in Hamburg, the first of three children of the family of the merchant and senator Caspar Voght (the elder, *1707 in Beverstedt close to Bremen, † 1781 in Hamburg) and Elisabeth Jencquel (* 26 September 1723), the daughter of a Hamburg senator. Voght's father was apprenticed around 1721 in the merchant house Jürgen Jencquel which specialized in Hamburg's trade with Portugal. For 16 years starting in 1732 he represented the merchant house in Lisbon. After he returned, Voght's father founded his own silk and linen trading company in Hamburg and later rose to the rank of senator in Hamburg.

At the age of 12, Caspar Voght fell seriously ill of smallpox which left permanent facial scarring. Other than making friends with Georg Heinrich Sieveking, whom he met as an adolescent in the Kontor of his father's firm, Voght was more inclined at this point in his life to dedicating himself to studying literature, politics, and science, and found little pleasure in his vocation as a merchant. When his father wanted to send him to Lisbon at the age of twenty for his education, Voght used his mother's fears of Lisbon to avoid going. She had lost two brothers in the Lisbon earthquake of 1755. Voght instead embarked in 1772 on a Grand Tour of Europe. His journey took him, among other locations, to Amsterdam, London, Paris and Cádiz. He reached Madrid, where he concluded a trade agreement for his father's business. After traveling through the south of France, Voght went to Switzerland, where he met Lavater and Haller. In Geneva he made contact with Voltaire. Passing through Turin, Milan, Parma and Bologna, he arrived in Rome where he was presented to Pope Pius VI. After a side trip to Pompeii, Naples, and a short stop in Venice, Voght traveled to Bergamo, where he made contact with the local silk weavers for his father's business. He then went to Vienna, Dresden, Berlin and Potsdam, finally returning to his hometown of Hamburg in 1775.

=== Trading Activity and Establishment of the Model Estate in Flottbek ===
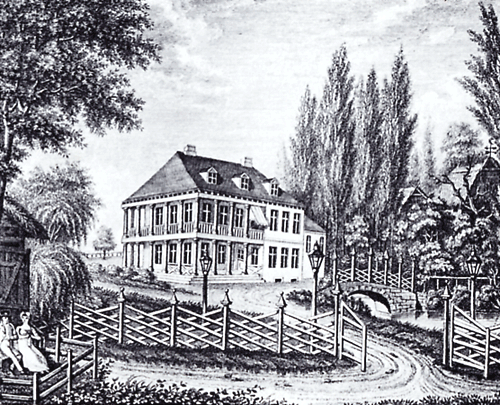
Voght's country house in Klein-Flottbek, steel engraving by L. Wolf (1805)

After the death of his father in 1781, Voght continued his father's company under the name "Caspar Voght & Co." in partnership with Georg Heinrich Sieveking. Together, they made use of the newly independent English colonies to build up strong mercantile ties with traders in ports along the North American coast. A good will missive dated March 29, 1783 was presented to Congress in Philadelphia on behalf of the Hamburg Senate by Johann Abraham de Boor. De Boor was a citizen of Hamburg who had traveled overseas under commission to the trading firm of Caspar Voght & Co.

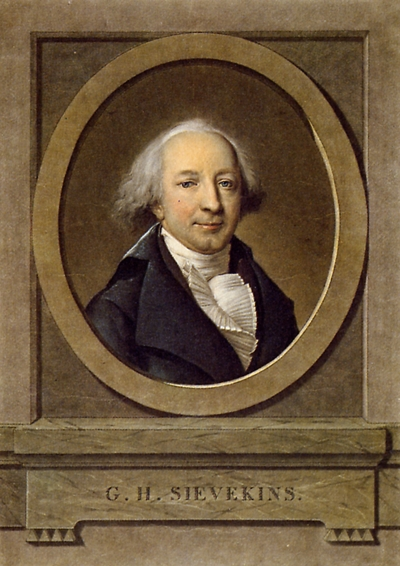
Georg Heinrich Sieveking, Coloured copper engraving by P. M. Alix, Paris

Voght's interests lay more with agriculture than with trading. Even as a youth, he was delighted being in a garden, designed on a French model, which his father owned in Hamm, at the outskirts of Hamburg. As Voght became older, he became aware that his inclination for landscape architecture and horticulture would be more than a hobby, and life in business repelled him increasingly. Not long before his death, Voght acknowledged in a letter: "When trade could no longer strike my fancy, I became nauseous". He handed the direction of the firm over to his partner Sieveking in a large measure. From 1785, Voght began to purchase lots of land in Klein Flottbek outside the gates of the then independent city of Altona. After a trip to England in the winter of 1785–6, where he tried to familiarize himself with the local landscape architecture and modern methods of husbandry, he began work on his Hamburg estates on a model farm and arboretum (the present day Jenisch Park was his parc du midi). Voght recruited two landscape gardeners for Flottbek renowned in Europe: the Scotsman James Booth and Frenchman Joseph Ramée. In 1787, Voght introduced the potato for cultivation. Up until then, it had been primarily an import product from the Netherlands. In 1797 he helped his stewart Lukas Andreas Staudinger found an institute for education in agriculture in Groß Flottbek. It was the first agricultural school in the German-speaking world. The most prominent student of this academy was Johann Heinrich von Thünen, who would later correspond with Voght primarily about questions of crops yields of soils.

=== Voght as poor house reformer ===
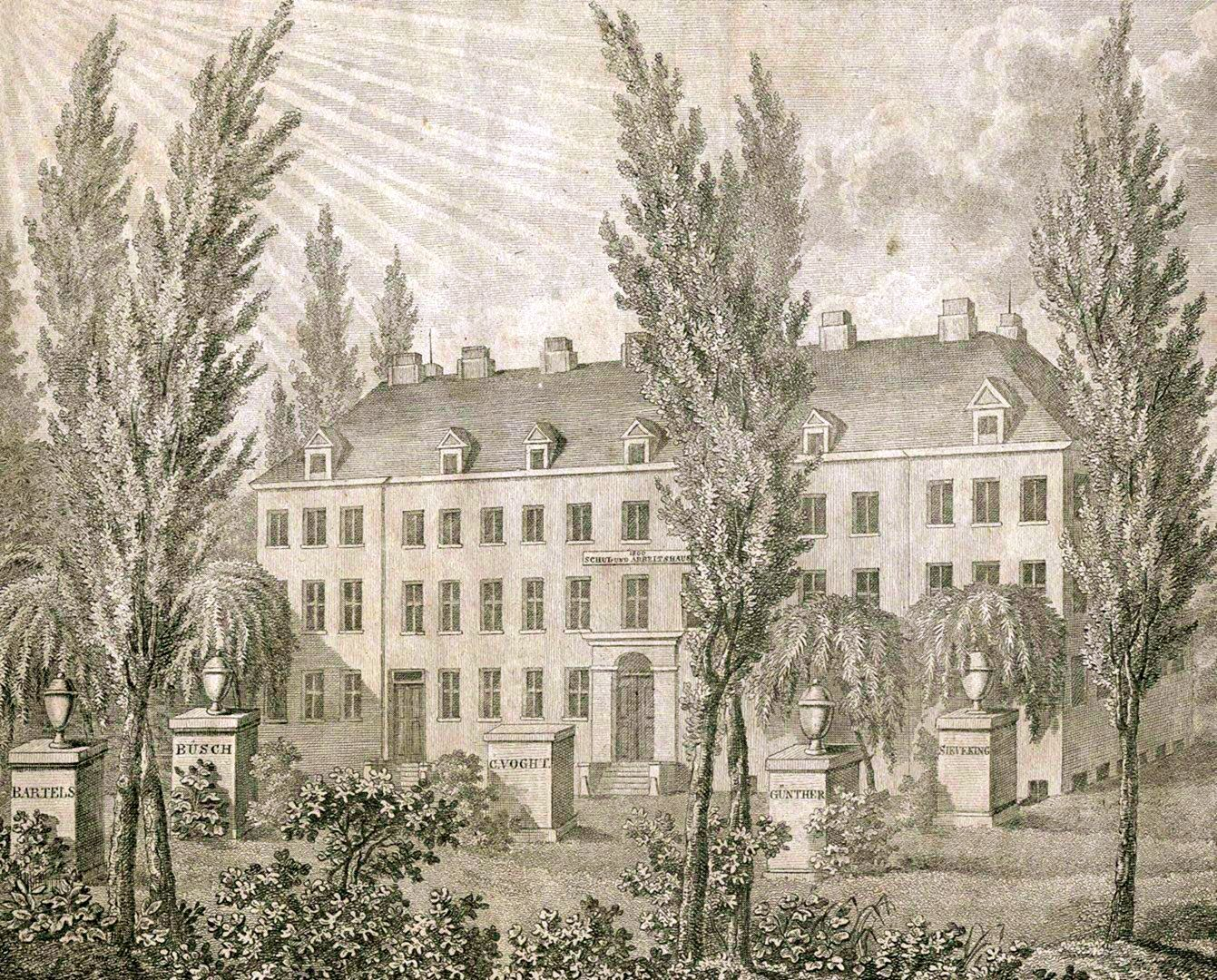
Idealized depiction of the Hamburg school and work house (1800). In the foreground, engraved on pedestals are the names of Hamburg's most important social pedagogues: Bartels, Büsch, Voght, Günther, Sieveking (Stahlstich von L. Wolf, 1805)

As early as 1770 Voght had come in contact with prisons, when, representing his father, he had shown the English prison reformer John Howard around Hamburg's penitentiary. From that time he maintained a great interest in matters related to poorhouses and prisons. Together with the head of the trade academy (Handelsakademie) Johann Georg Büsch and the lawyer Johann Arnold Günther, Voght initiated in 1788 the establishment of a 'common institution for the poor' (Allgemeinen Armenanstalt) with which he reformed Hamburg's poor provision. The foundation of this reform was the division of the city into care zones whose approximately 200 inhabitants were entrusted with finding voluntary means of caring for the poor in that zone. The institute guaranteed medical attention for the poor, support during pregnancy and childbirth, and education and work for poor children. In contrast to the prevailing mode of providing for the poor, which was usually ecclesiastical and focused on moral and spiritual aspects of the situation, the reform was directed towards the economic needs of those affected. The cost of the effort was met by tithes collected in churches and weekly collections for the poor. As a result of this effort, the number of occupants in Hamburg's penitentiaries sank drastically.

Voght's success in the fight against poverty had effects throughout Hamburg and beyond. In 1801, the Emperor summoned him to Vienna, in order to suggest remedies and help prepare plans for a reform of the poor provisions in that city. For this service, he granted the title of baron (Reichsfreiherr) and was thereby ennobled. During a stay in Berlin in the winter of 1802–03, Voght authored a review about poor provision in Berlin at the request of the Prussian King Friedrich Wilhelm III. During a many-month stay in Paris in 1807, he prepared a report commissioned by the French interior ministry on the situation of the Parisian poorhouses, orphanages, maternity houses, and prisons. Beyond these, he reformed poor provision in Marseille and Lyon, and communicated his understanding of reform to Lisbon and Porto. In 1838 at the age of 86, on the fiftieth anniversary of the Hamburger poor institute, he wrote a book entitled Reflections on the 50 Year History of the Poor Institute (Gesammeltes aus der Geschichte der Armenanstalt während ihrer 50jährigen Dauer).

=== The later years ===
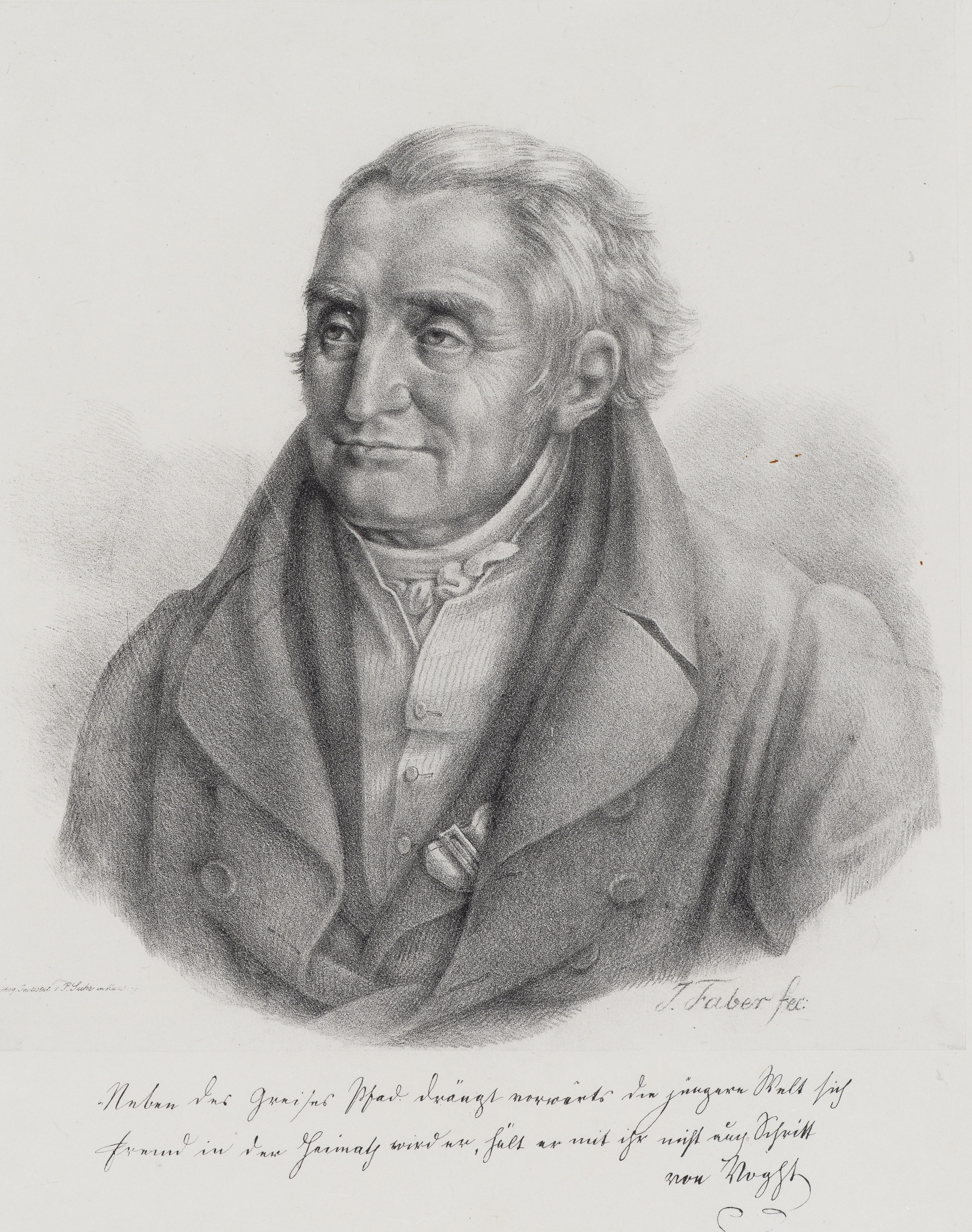
Caspar Voght. Lithograph by Johann Joachim Faber

By 1793 Voght had handed over all business affairs with the exception of trade with the US to his Partner Sieveking. The trade crisis which hit Hamburg in 1799 struck his firm heavily, so that he finally had to dissolve the trade house.

During the period of the Continental System he undertook another multi-year trip through Switzerland, France, and Italy, during which he got to know the Emperor Napoleon and his first wife Josephine in Paris. After his return to Flottbek he lived mainly from income earned from agriculture. Upon the sale of his model estate to the banker and senator Martin Johann Jenisch in 1828, Voght lived with Bonaparte. He later dwelt with the widow of his partner Georg Heinrich Sieveking, who had died in 1799.

Voght died in Hamburg on 20 March 1839 at the age of 86. He was buried in the Nienstedtener cemetery.

== In celebration of Caspar Voght ==
Two streets in Hamburg are named after Caspar Voght: Baron-Voght-Straße in Klein-Flottbek and Caspar-Voght-Straße in Hamm.

There was also a secondary school named after him, the coeducational Caspar-Voght-Gymnasium (formerly an Oberrealschule for girls only) at Caspar-Voght-Straße. The school has been converted and today is the home of the ballet school of Hamburg run by John Neumeier.
