= Johann Albert Heinrich Reimarus =

German physician, natural historian and economist (1729–1814)

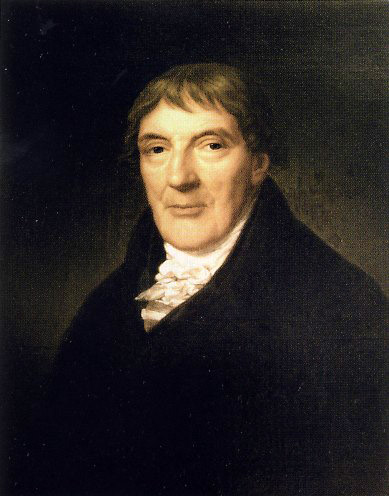
- Johann Albert Hinrich Reimarus; painting by Friedrich Carl Gröger 1818.
- Born: 11 November 1729; Hamburg, Germany
- Died: 6 June 1814 (aged 84); Rantzau, Plön, Germany
- Occupations: German scholar, physician, economist

Johann Albert Heinrich Reimarus (11 November 1729 – 6 June 1814) was a German physician, natural historian and economist.

He was the son of Hermann Samuel Reimarus, the brother of the writer Elise Reimarus and the father (by his first marriage) of Johanna Reimarius, who married Georg Heinrich Sieveking. He married twice, the second time to Sophia, sister of August Adolph von Hennings.

In 1755, he visited London and studied under the anatomists William Hunter and James Douglas. His achievements include introducing smallpox vaccination to Hamburg and introducing continental Europe to the idea of the lightning rod.
