= Georg Heinrich Sieveking =

German merchant and follower of the Enlightenment (1751-1799)

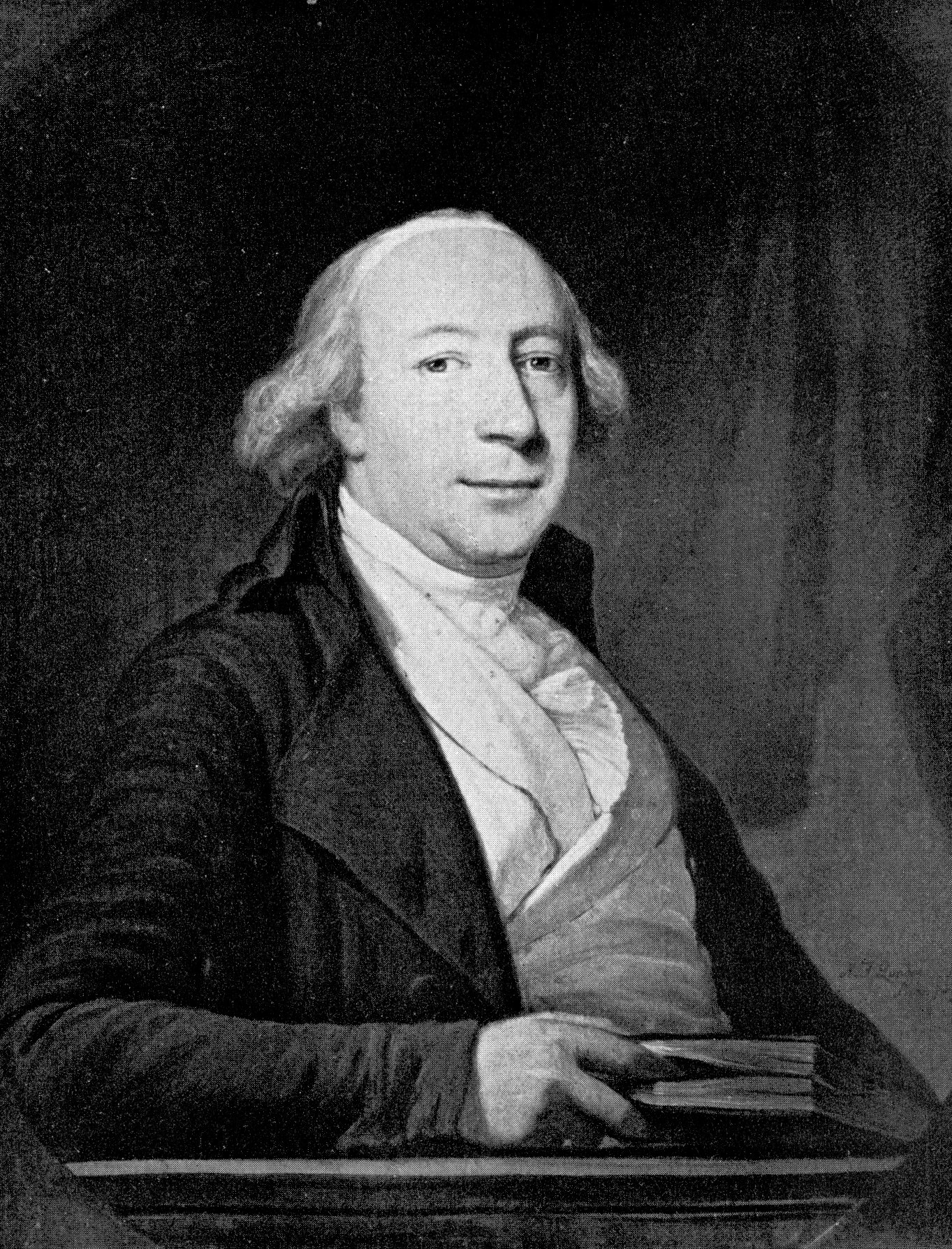
Painting by Martin Ferdinand Quadal; 1796; 70:54 cm

Georg Heinrich Sieveking (1 January 1751 – 25 January 1799) was a German merchant and follower of the Enlightenment. Together with his friend and business partner, Caspar Voght, he led one of the largest trading firms in the Hanseatic League during the second half of the 18th century. On 14 July 1790, the first anniversary of the Storming of the Bastille, a freedom celebration organized by Sieveking occurred in Harvestehude, a neighborhood of Hamburg, which received attention far beyond the city. In 1796, a few years before his death, Sieveking succeeded in abolishing the 1793 Hamburg-imposed Embargoes against Paris.

== Family and early life ==
Sieveking was born on 1 January 1751 in Hamburg, Holy Roman Empire. His father's side of the family came from Westphalia, and his grandfather was Ahasver Hinrich (1668–1729) the First, who entered the merchant's trade by founding a business that specialised in trading linen in Versmold. His son Peter Niclaes (1718–1763) followed him in the cloth trade, but went to Hamburg, where he became a citizen in 1747. Only two years later he married Catharina Margaretha Büsch, the daughter of a wine merchant who had come to Hamburg from Lüneburg, whose brother Georg Heinrich Büsch had risen to become a Senator of Hamburg. Her first son, born in 1751, was named after him. In accordance with family tradition, he was designated to enter the merchant business, which actually also suited him due to his mathematical talent. Together with his brother Heinrich Christian Sieveking, who was a year younger, he was taught by a private tutor, until both were sent to hear the mathematics lectures of Johann Georg Büsch at the Hamburg commercial academy in 1764.

He married Johanna Margaretha Sieveking, the daughter of the medical doctor, natural historian and economist Johann Albert Heinrich Reimarus. Their son, Karl Sieveking, was a Syndicus of Hamburg from 1820 to 1847.

== The firm Voght & Sieveking ==
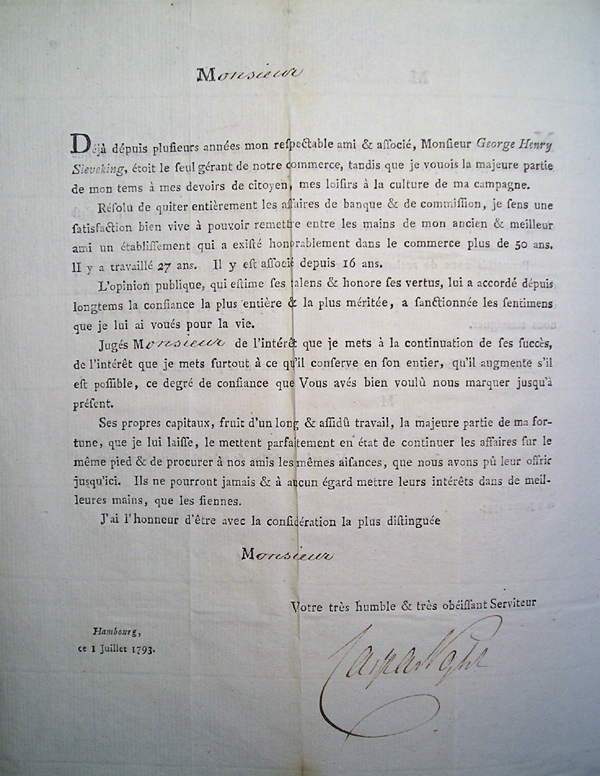
Round letter from 1 July 1793 with Voght's announcement that he would retire from the firm

On 1 August 1766 Sieveking joined the firm of the Hamburg Senator Voght as an apprentice. During his apprentice period he proved himself so diligent that Voght granted him a stake in the firm in 1771, alongside his own son, Caspar. After the Senator's death in 1781, they both continued the business of the firm together, at first under the name "Caspar Voght & Co.", then, after 1788, as "Voght und Sieveking". By Sieveking's 40th birthday on 28 January 1791, Voght had granted him a third of all profits, later he granted him one half. On 1 July 1793, Caspar Voght transferred all activities to Sieveking, apart from the trade with America, and dedicated himself to other pursuits.

Instead of concentrating on a specific sector of trade, Voght und Sieveking traded a wide range of goods, on the basis of a broad spectrum of clients. The focus of their import business was initially on the ports of the French Atlantic coast and of England, but already with the outbreak of the American Revolutionary War, ships of the firm from the ports of the American East Coast laden with tobacco, rice and indigo arrived in the Hanseatic city. Voght stated of himself: "Ich war der erste Hamburger Kaufmann, der aus Mocca Kaffee, aus Baltimore Toback, aus Surinam Kaffee, aus Afrika Gummi holte" ("I was the first Hamburg businessman to bring coffee from Mokha, tobacco from Baltimore, coffee from Suriname, rubber from Africa"). It was Georg Heinrich Sieveking, however, who was the real driving force behind the business, which was run jointly until 1793. Whilst Voght crossed all of Europe on his extensive travels, his partner Sieveking took care of running the business in Hamburg mostly on his own. Voght himself underlined this fact, when he wrote in a letter to all business partners in July 1793 that his friend had been the sole decision-maker of the firm for some years ("le seul gérant de notre commerce").

== Sieveking and the French Revolution ==
=== Friends and Freemasonry ===
From an early age, Sieveking had shown a great interest in literature. Alongside his childhood friends Johann Michael Hudtwalcker (born 1747) and Caspar Voght (born 1752) he composed poetry and prose, and performed plays with Hudtwalcker's sisters. Sieveking's wife Johanna Magdalena Sieveking (née Reimarus) maintained a literary salon in Hamburg, which represented similar ideas. Some of the greatest role models of this circle around Sieveking were Gotthold Ephraim Lessing and Friedrich Gottlieb Klopstock, whom they gushingly admired as the composer of the Messias. Sieveking further developed his Enlightenment ideas as a Freemason in the Hamburg Lodge "St. Georg zur grünenden Fichte" ("St George of the verdant spruce"), and became its Worshipful Master in 1789. In a speech at the Lodge on freedom he already in 1777 advanced a moderated concept of freedom:

"Lawlessness is precisely what freedom is not: Even the noble Architect of the great Universe, the most free of all Beings, is governed in all His actions by the eternal and immutable laws of beauty, wisdom and strength, of order and harmony. He is free who is guided by sensible reasons and not by outside force. Freedom in the state does not mean independence from the laws, but safety from unreasonable laws and arbitrary interference in our rights by the authorities."

"Freiheit ist eben nicht Gesetzlosigkeit: Selbst der erhabene Baumeister des großen Weltalls, der das freieste aller Wesen ist, wird in jeder seiner Handlungen durch die ewigen, unveränderlichen Gesetze der Schönheit, Weisheit und Stärke, der Ordnung und Harmonie regiert. Frei ist der, welcher in seiner Wahl durch vernünftige Gründe und nicht durch fremde Gewalt bestimmt ist. Freiheit im Staate heißt nicht Unabhängigkeit von den Gesetzen, sondern Sicherheit vor unvernünftigen Gesetzen und eigenmächtigen Eingriffen der Obrigkeit in unsere Rechte".

Sieveking and his friends saw their ideals put into practice when the French Revolution started in 1789, at least until the revolutionary idea of freedom was taken to absurd lengths by the Terreur of Robespierre.

=== Freedom celebration in Harvestehude ===
Whilst the first anniversary of the storming of the Bastille was celebrated in Paris on the Champ de Mars, in Harvestehude in front of the gates of Hamburg a freedom festival took place, organized by Georg Heinrich Sieveking. The most prominent amongst the 80 guests were Adolph Freiherr Knigge and Sieveking's idol Friedrich Gottlieb Klopstock.

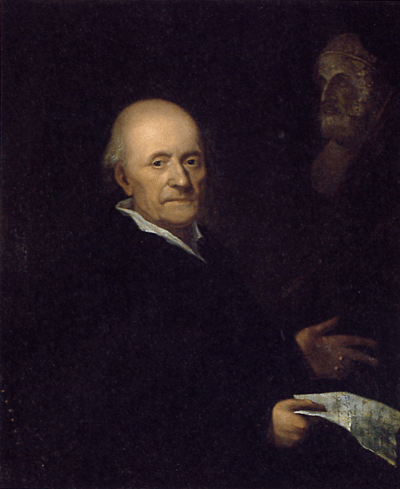
Friedrich Gottlieb Klopstock, painting by M. E. Vogel

=== Reactions ===
The celebration caused a furore far beyond the borders of Hamburg – even the leader of the Girondists, Jacques Pierre Brissot, praised it in his "Patriot Français" – but remained without consequence for the political culture of Hamburg. The Senate of Hamburg did not take account of it, and Sauveur Joseph Gandolphe, the French chargé d'affaires in Hamburg, declined to attend, claiming that "the celebration in Harvestehude could have led to the excitement of a population that was at this point the calmest in all of Europe". He even suspected merely commercial motives in Sieveking's and Voght's activities. The firm had greatly profited from grain exports to France, and Gandolphe suspected that the celebration of Harvestehude had merely been staged to please the French and pave the way for further exchanges.

=== An meine Mitbürger ===
Execution of Louis XVI (engraving from 1793)

After the Revolution in France had grown increasingly radicalised and the French King Louis XVI had been executed in January 1793, Sieveking came under increasing pressure in Hamburg. He finally countered the accusation that he was a Jacobin with an open letter with the title An meine Mitbürger ("To my fellow citizens"), in which he strongly denied having been pleased at the King's death. At the same time he condemned the excesses of the Revolution as "anarchy, intrigues, disobedience of the law, irreligiosity, cruelty and murder", but did not declare himself fundamentally opposed to the principles of the Revolution, based on the ideas of the Enlightenment. His business partner Voght, on the other hand, went further: he later accepted the title of "Baron" and argued for a restriction of the freedom of the press. In a letter to Magdalene Pauli, Voght wrote soberly in 1794: "Wie ein entzückender Traum schweben die Jahre 89 und 90 vor meiner Seele. Ich bin schrecklich erwacht." ("The years 89 and 90 hover before my soul like a delightful dream. I have awakened terribly.")

== Special envoy in Paris ==
=== Imperial war, Le Hoc's expulsion and the embargo ===
When the War of the First Coalition (1792–1797) against France was officially declared an imperial war (Reichskrieg), restrictions came into force for the trade between Hamburg and France. Specifically the export of grain and meat, which were vital for the war, was prohibited. A number of merchants – including Sieveking – attempted to circumvent this rule by transporting their goods to the Danish port of Altona, and shipping them to France from there. The relations between the Hamburgers and France, until then the city's most important trading partner by far, were still strong despite the prohibitions: this provoked the ire of Austria and its ally, Prussia. In February 1793 the Lower Saxonian circle, led by Prussia, and supported by the imperial envoy Binder von Kriegelstein, demanded the expulsion of the French envoy in Hamburg, François Le Hoc. At the end of 1792, he had founded a reading society in Hamburg with the journalist Friedrich Wilhelm von Schütz on the model of the Jacobin club of Mainz, of which Sieveking had been elected president, and for this reason alone was suspected of incitement. When the Hamburg Senate finally submitted to the pressure and expelled Le Hoc, he cancelled the trade treaty concluded between Hamburg and Paris in 1789 in his letter of protest. Furthermore, the National Convention ordered the confiscation of all Hamburg ships in French ports and imposed a trade embargo on the Hanseatic city. Although the embargo was subsequently imposed quite mildly by the French, and the Hamburg merchants continued to do everything they could to circumvent the German prohibition via Altona, the volume of trade between Hamburg and France declined drastically.

=== Sieveking in Paris ===
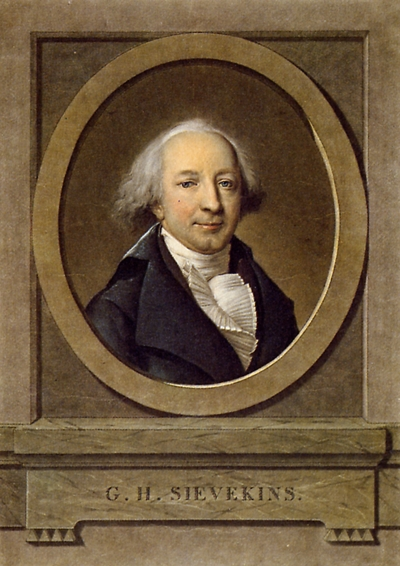
Portrait of Sieveking

Already in March 1795, the Hamburg Chamber of Commerce had therefore raised the idea of a special envoy to Paris, in order to reverse the embargo. Due to his high standing in Paris, Sieveking was the obvious choice, and he arrived in Paris as special envoy on the night of 31 March 1796 with his delegation, which included the President of the Hamburg Cathedral chapter Friedrich Johann Lorenz Meyer. There, a period of relative political stability had returned, after the crushing of the anti-revolutionary uprising of 13 Vendémaire (5 October 1795) by Napoleon and Paul de Barras. On 12 April 1796 Sieveking was granted an audience with the French Directory, where a solution to the conflict could not be reached, however. His plan to support France's finances by raising the exchange rate for the mostly devalued assignats was rejected by the French as insufficient, and by the Hamburg Senate as impossible. On 27 April, Sieveking received 300,000 Marks from the Hamburg Chamber of Commerce to be used at his own discretion, and he did not hesitate in using it to bribe Barras and other powerful figures of the Republic. In May 1796, after a meeting with the French finance minister Dominique-Vincent Ramel-Nogaret, a fortunate turn of events occurred. The Directory ratified a treaty on 14 June 1796 which provided for the payment of 13 million livres, which Sieveking guaranteed personally. That same evening, Barras met with Sieveking, and told him: "Votre affaire est finie" ("Your business here is finished"). The official signing took place ten days later, and a worried Sieveking wrote to Hamburg the same day: "ob ich das Opfer meines Patriotismus sein werde, das werden meine Mitbürger entscheiden" ("whether I shall be the victim of my own patriotism, that will be for my fellow citizens to decide"). But his fears proved unfounded. On his return in July 1796, Sieveking was received with honours. In his report before the assembled members of the chamber of commerce he said that this moment was one of the finest and most important of his life and claimed: "Ich schwöre es bei Ihrer Achtung, bei meiner Ehre, ich habe Hamburg gerettet" ("I swear by your esteem, by my honour, I have saved Hamburg").

== Death ==
Sieveking died suddenly and unexpectedly on On 25 January 1799 in Hamburg. Wilhelm von Humboldt wrote in a letter: "The memory of the deceased will surely remain unforgettable amongst all his friends, and surely few have had the good luck to be so generally and sincerely pitied and missed". The firm of Sieveking was only able to survive the great Hamburg trade depression of 1799 with difficulty, but then went bankrupt in the course of the Continental System and was dissolved in April 1811.
