= Johann Georg Büsch =

German mathematics teacher and writer (1728–1800)

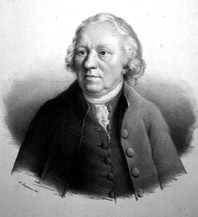
- Scientific career
- Doctoral advisor: Johann Andreas Segner
- Doctoral students: Johann Bode

Johann Georg Büsch (January 3, 1728 at Alten-Weding in Hanover – August 5, 1800 in Hamburg) was a German mathematics teacher and writer on statistics and commerce.

== Biography ==
He was educated at Hamburg and Göttingen, and in 1756 was made professor of mathematics in the Hamburg gymnasium, which post he held until his death. Besides suggesting many theoretical improvements in the carrying on of trade by the city, he brought about the establishment of an association for the promotion of art and industry (German: Hamburgische Gesellschaft zur Beförderung der Künste und nützlichen Gewerbe), and the foundation of a school of trade, instituted in 1767, which became under his direction one of the most noted establishments of its class in the world. For some time before his death Büsch was almost totally blind.

As a mathematics teacher he mentored and helped the young Johann Elert Bode, who later became a famous astronomer.

== Works ==
Besides a history of trade (Geschichte der merkwürdigsten Welthändel, Hamburg, 1781), he wrote voluminously on all subjects connected with commerce and political economy. His collected works were published in 16 volumes at Zwickau in 1813–16, and 8 volumes of selected writings, comprising those on trade alone, at Hamburg, 1824–27.
