= List of compositions by Franz Schubert (1827) =

Franz Schubert's compositions of 1827 are mostly in the Deutsch catalogue (D) range D 896–936, and include:

- Instrumental works:
  - Piano Trio No. 2, D 929
  - Fantasy for violin and piano, D 934
  - Impromptus, D 899 and 935
- Vocal music:
  - Der Graf von Gleichen, D 918
  - Winterreise, D 911
  - "Ständchen", D 920

== Table ==
=== Legend ===
Legend to the table
column		content
1	D '51	Deutsch number in the first version of the Deutsch catalogue (1951)
2	D utd	most recent (utd = up to date) Deutsch catalogue number; the basic collation of the list is according to these numbers – whether or not the possibility to adjust the sorting according to the content of other columns is available depends on the device with which the table is displayed.
3	Op. pbl	Opus number (Op.; p indicates Post. = posthumous) and date of first publication (pbl; between brackets; when there is more than one date the earlier dates indicate partial publications). The column sorts to Opus number, then (earliest of) the publication date(s)
4	AGA	Alte Gesamt-Ausgabe = Franz Schubert's Werke: Kritisch durchgesehene Gesammtausgabe. Indicates genre/instrumentation: Series I: Symphonien (Nos. 1-8) (Johannes Brahms, 1884); Series II: Overtüren und Andere Orchesterwerke (Johann Nepomuk Fuchs, 1886); Series III: Oktette (Nos. 1-3) and IV: Streichquintett (Eusebius Mandyczewski, 1889); Series V: Streichquartette (Nos. 1-15) (Joseph Hellmesberger and Eusebius Mandyczewski, 1890); Series VI: Trio für Streichinstrumente (Eusebius Mandyczewski, 1892); Series VII: Trios, Quartets and Quintets with Piano and VIII: Pianoforte und Ein Instrument (Ignaz Brüll, 1886); Series IX: Pianoforte zu vier Händen (Anton Door, 1888); Series X: Sonaten für Pianoforte (Julius Epstein, 1888); Series XI: Fantasie, Impromptus und andere Stücke für Pianoforte (Julius Epstein, 1888); Series XII: Tänze für Pianoforte (Nos. 1-31) (Julius Epstein, 1889); Series XIII: Messen (Nos. 1-7) (Eusebius Mandyczewski, 1887); Series XIV: Kleinere Kirchenmusikwerke (Nos. 1-22) (Eusebius Mandyczewski, 1888); Series XV: Dramatische Musik (Johann Nepomuk Fuchs, 1893); Series XVI: Werke für Männerchor (Nos. 1-46) (Eusebius Mandyczewski, 1891); Series XVII: Werke für gemischten Chor (Nos. 1-19) (Josef Gänsbacher, Eusebius Mandyczewski, 1892); Series XVIII: Werke für Drei und mehr Frauenstimmen mit Pianoforte-Begleitung (Nos. 1-6) (Josef Gänsbacher, Eusebius Mandyczewski, 1891); Series XIX: Kleine Gesangswerke (Nos. 1-36) (Josef Gänsbacher and Eusebius Mandyczewski, 1892); Series XX: Sämtliche einstimmige Lieder und Gesänge (Eusebius Mandyczewski, 1894-1895); Series XXI: Supplement (Eusebius Mandyczewski, 1897); 1. Instrumentalmusik No. 1-5; 2. Instrumentalmusik No. 6-13; 3. Instrumentalmusik No. 14-; 4. Gesangsmusik; Series XXII: Revisionsbericht
5	NSA	NGA/NSA/NSE = New Schubert Edition, also indicates genre/instrumentation: Series I: Church Music; Series II: Stage Works; Series III: Part Songs; Series IV: Lieder; Series V: Orchestral Works; Series VI: Chamber Music; 1. Octet and Nonet; 2. String Quintet; 3. String Quartets I; 4. String Quartets II; 5. String Quartets III; 6. String Trios; 7. Works for Piano and several instruments; 8. Works for Piano and one instrument; 9. Dances for several instruments; Series VII: Piano Music; 1. Works for Piano Four Hands; 2. Works for Piano Two Hands; Series VIII: Supplement, 2. Schubert's Studies
6	Name	unique name, with, if available, a link to the relevant encyclopedia article; sorts by name with initial definite ("Der", "Die", "Das", ...) or indefinite ("Ein", "A", ...) articles, and numbers, moved after the expression they qualify: e.g. "Die Hoffnung, ..." sorts as "Hoffnung, Die, ..." – "Thirty Minuets ..." sorts as "Minuets, 30, ...".
7	Key / incipit	incipit mostly for songs (linking to lyrics and their translation, for instance at The LiederNet Archive, when available), other compositions by key, except for Schubert's stage works: type of composition in brackets.
8	Date	(presumed) date of composition, or, for copies and arrangements, date of Schubert's autograph. Sorts to earliest possible date of completion, unlike the chronology of the Deutsch catalogue that generally collates according to earliest date associated with the composition: e.g. Schubert started the composition of his 3rd String Quartet on 19 November 1812 and completed it on 21 February 1813 – in the Deutsch catalogue the composition is grouped with other compositions from 1812: when using the sort function of the 8th column the composition is grouped with compositions completed in 1813
9	Additional info	may include: Information about the text (lyrics, libretto) of vocal compositions: e.g., "Text by [text author]", "Text: [standard lyrics]", "... from [literary work]"; "other settings: D ..." indicates Schubert's other settings of the same text; for fields starting with "Text ..." this column sorts by text author (last name, first name—or pen name when such name is more established), then incipit of the lyrics (alternatively, when the incipit is rarely used, title of the work); Information about the authenticity of the composition: the work is without doubt Schubert's unless when marked as "Doubtful", "Spurious?" or "Spurious" (in the last case columns 3–8 give no further information about the composition); Forces needed for performance ("For ..."): may be omitted when the type of composition makes the instrumentation clear (e.g. String Quartet → two violins, viola and cello), and, for vocal music, when the setting is for voice and piano; "s", "a", "t" and "b" refer to a single soprano, alto, tenor and bass singer respectively, while "S", "A", "T" and "B" to choral parts for the same types of singers (see SATB).; Specifications regarding movements (e.g. "Allegro – Minuet – Rondo") or sections (e.g. "No. 1 ..."); Information about the completeness of the extant work: the work is considered complete as extant unless when marked "Sketch", "Incomplete", "Unfinished", "Fragment" or "Lost"; Information about versions (e.g. "Two versions: ...")

=== List ===
Compositions by Franz Schubert listed in the Deutsch catalogue for 1827
D '51	D utd	Op. pbl	AGA	NSA	Name	Key / incipit	Date	Additional info
896	896			IV, 14	Fröhliches Scheiden	Gar fröhlich kann ich scheiden	fall 1827– early 1828	Text by Leitner; Sketch
	896A			IV, 14	Sie in jedem Liede	Nehm ich die Harfe	fall 1827– early 1828	Text by Leitner; Sketch
	896B			IV, 14	Wolke und Quelle	Auf meinen heimischen Bergen	fall 1827– early 1828	Text by Leitner; Sketch
897	897	148p (1846)	VII, 2 No. 5	VI, 7 No. 4	Notturno (Piano Trio, D 897)	E♭ major	1828?	Adagio
898	898	99p (1836)	VII, 2 No. 3	VI, 7 No. 3	Piano Trio No. 1	B♭ major	1828?	Allegro moderato – Andante un poco mosso – Scherzo – Rondo
899	899	90 (1827) (1857)	XI No. 2	VII/2, 5 & Anh.	Impromptus Nos. 1–4	C minor – E♭ major – G♭ major – A♭ major	summer– fall 1827?	For piano; Nos. 1–2 publ. 1827
900	900	(1897)	XXI, 3 No. 16	VII/2, 5 Anh.	Allegretto, D 900	C minor	1821 or later?	For piano; Fragment
901	901	(1827)	XVI; No. 37	III, 4 No. 58	Wein und Liebe	Liebchen und der Saft der Reben	before June 1827	Text by Haug; For ttbb
902	902	83 (1827)	XX, 10; Nos. 579– 581	IV, 4	Drei Gesänge: 1. L'incanto degli occhi (Die Macht der Augen) – 2. Il traditor deluso (Der getäuschte Verräter) – 3. Il modo di prender moglie (Die Art ein Weib zu nehmen)	1. Da voi, cari lumi (Nur euch, schöne Sterne) – 2. Ahimè, io tremo! (Weh mir, ich bebe!) – 3. Orsù! non ci pensiamo (Wohlan! und ohne Zagen)	1827 (before September)	Text by Metastasio, from Attilio Regolo II, 5 (No. 1, other version: D 990E) and Gioas re di Giuda II (No. 2); For b and piano
903	903	81,3 (1827)	XVI; No. 11	III, 3 No. 37; IV, 4	Zur guten Nacht	Horch auf! Es schlägt die Stunde	January; 1827	Text by Rochlitz; For vocal soloist, TTBB and piano
904	904	81,1 (1827)	XX, 4 No. 287	IV, 4	Alinde	Die Sonne sinkt ins tiefe Meer	January; 1827	Text by Rochlitz
905	905	81,2 (1827)	XX, 4 No. 288	IV, 4	An die Laute	Leiser, leiser, kleine Laute	January; 1827	Text by Rochlitz
906	906	(1832)	XX, 8 No. 514	IV, 14	Der Vater mit dem Kind	Dem Vater liegt das kind in Arm	January; 1827	Text by Bauernfeld
907	907	86 (1828) (1979)	XX, 8 No. 501	IV, 4	Romanze des Richard Löwenherz	Großer Taten tat der Ritter fern im heiligen Lande viel	March; 1826?	Text by Scott from Ivanhoe transl. by Müller, (K. L.) M. (Ch. 17); Two versions: 2nd, in AGA, is Op. 86
908	908	82,1 (1827)	IX, 2 No. 17	VII/1, 3 No. 1 Anh. No. 1	Eight Variations on a theme from Hérold's Marie	C major	February; 1827	For piano duet
909	909	96,2 (1828)	XX, 8 No. 515	IV, 5	Jägers Liebeslied	Ich schieß' den Hirsch im grünen Forst	February; 1827	Text by Schober
910	910	(1833)	XX, 8 No. 516	IV, 14	Schiffers Scheidelied	Die Wogen am Gestade schwellen	February; 1827	Text by Schober
911	911	89 (1828)	XX, 9 Nos. 517– 540	IV, 4	Winterreise: —Part I—: 1. Gute Nacht – 2. Die Wetterfahne – 3. Gefror'ne Tränen – 4. Erstarrung – 5. Der Lindenbaum – 6. Wasserflut – 7. Auf dem Flusse – 8. Rückblick – 9. Irrlicht – 10. Rast – 11. Frühlingstraum – 12. Einsamkeit; —Part II—: 13. Die Post – 14. Der greise Kopf – 15. Die Krähe – 16. Letzte Hoffnung – 17. Im Dorfe – 18. Der stürmische Morgen – 19. Täuschung – 20. Der Wegweiser – 21. Das Wirtshaus – 22. Mut – 23. Die Nebensonnen – 24. Der Leiermann	—Part I—: 1. Fremd bin ich eingezogen – 2. Der Wind spielt mit der Wetterfahne – 3. Gefror'ne Tropfen fallen – 4. Ich such' im Schnee vergebens – 5. Am Brunnen vor dem Tore – 6. Manche Trän' aus meinen Augen – 7. Der du so lustig rauschtest – 8. Es brennt mir unter beiden Sohlen – 9. In die tiefsten Felsengründe – 10. Nun merk' ich erst, wie müd ich bin – 11. Ich träumte von bunten Blumen – 12. Wie eine trübe Wolke; —Part II—: 13. Von der Straße her ein Posthorn klingt – 14. Der Reif hat einen weißen Schein – 15. Eine Krähe war mit mir aus der Stadt gezogen – 16. Hie und da ist an den Bäumen – 17. Es bellen die Hunde – 18. Wie hat der Sturm zerrissen – 19. Ein Licht tanzt freundlich vor mir her – 20. Was vermeid' ich denn die Wege – 21. Auf einen Totenacker hat mich mein Weg gebracht – 22. Fliegt der Schnee mir ins Gesicht – 23. Drei Sonnen sah ich – 24. Drüben hinterm Dorfe steht ein Leiermann	February; 1827 (Part I started); October; 1827 (Part II started)	Text by Müller, W.; Two versions for Nos. 7, 10, 11, 22 and 23; Music of No. 19 partly based on D 732 No. 11
912	912	151p (1845)	XVI; No. 28	III, 4 No. 59	Schlachtlied, D 912	Mit unserm Arm ist nichts getan	28/2/1827	Text by Klopstock, from Oden (other setting: D 443); For TTBBTTBB
913	913	139pII (1846)	XVI; No. 1	III, 1	Nachtgesang im Walde	Sei uns stets gegrüßt, o Nacht!	April 1827	Text by Seidl; For ttbb and four horns
914	914	(1897)	XXI, 4 No. 36a	III, 4 No. 60	Frühlingslied, D 914	Geöffnet sind des Winters Riegel	April 1827	Text by Pollak; Music reappears in other setting D 919); For ttbb
915	915	(1870)	XI No. 12	VII/2, 5	Allegretto, D 915	C minor	26/4/1827	For piano
916	916	(1961)		III, 4 Anh. II No. 4	Das stille Lied	Schweige nur, süßer Mund	May 1827	Text by Seegemund; For ttbb; Sketch
	916A			IV, 14	Liedentwurf, D 916A	C major	May 1827?	Sketch without text
	916B	(1978)		VII/2, 5 Anh.	Piano piece, D 916B	C major	summer– fall 1827?	Sketch
	916C	(1978)		VII/2, 5 Anh.	Piano piece, D 916C	C minor	summer– fall 1827?	Sketch
917	917	115p,1 (1829)	XX, 9 No. 543	IV, 14	Das Lied im Grünen	Ins Grüne, ins Grüne	June 1827	Text by Reil
918	918	(1868) (1962)		II, 17	Der Graf von Gleichen	(Opera in two acts)	started 19/6/1827	Text by Bauernfeld; For ssssttbbbbbbSATB and orchestra; Music for Nos. 1–20f (sketches); No. 13 partly based on D 260 and No. 20c on D 102; Completions of No. 1 publ. in 1868, as "Morgengesang im Walde", and of No. 14 in 1962; Act I: Nos. 1–11 – Act II: Nos. 12–22
919	919	(1897)	XXI, 4 No. 36b	IV, 14	Frühlingslied, D 919	Geöffnet sind des Winters Riegel	spring 1827?	Text by Pollak; Music based on other setting D 914
920; 921	920	135p (1840) (1891)	XVI; No. 14; XVIII; No. 4	III, 3 No. 38	Ständchen, D 920, a.k.a. Notturno	Zögernd leise	July 1827	Text by Grillparzer; For a, choir and piano; Two versions: choir TTBB in 1st, and SSAA in 2nd (which was D 921, publ. as Op. posth. 135)
922	922	106,1 (1828) (1895)	XX, 9 No. 544	IV, 5	Heimliches Lieben	O du, wenn deine Lippen mich berühren	September; 1827	Text by Klen(c)ke; Two versions: 2nd is Op. 106 No. 1
923	923	165p,5 (1862) (1895) (1971)	XX, 9 No. 545	III, 2b No. 24; IV, 14	Eine altschottische Ballade	Dein Schwert, wie ist’s von Blut so rot	September; 1827	Text by Herder after "Edward, Edward" from Percy's Reliques of Ancient English Poetry; For male voice, female voice and piano; Three versions: 1st is Op. posth. 165 No. 5 – 2nd for voice and piano – 3rd publ. in 1971
924	924	91 (1828)	XII; No. 7	VII/2, 7a	Twelve Grazer Waltzes	Various keys	September; 1827?	For piano
925	925	(1828)	XII; No. 24	VII/2, 7a	Grazer Galopp	C major	September; 1827?	For piano
926	926	106,2 (1828)	XX, 9 No. 546	IV, 5	Das Weinen	Gar tröstlich kommt geronnen	fall 1827– early 1828	Text by Leitner
927	927	106,3 (1828)	XX, 9 No. 547	IV, 5	Vor meiner Wiege	Das also, das ist der enge Schrein	fall 1827– early 1828	Text by Leitner
928	928	(1870)	IX, 1 No. 7	VII/1, 4	March, D 928, a.k.a. Kindermarsch	G major	12/10/1827	For piano duet
929	929	100 (1828) (1975)	VII, 2 No. 4	VI, 7 No. 2 & Anh.	Piano Trio No. 2	E♭ major	started Nov. 1827	Allegro – Andante con moto – Scherzando – Allegro moderato; Shortened version, in AGA, is Op. 100
930	930	104p (1829)	XIX; No. 2	III, 2a No. 15	Der Hochzeitsbraten	Ach liebes Herz, ach Theobald	November; 1827	Text by Schober; For stb and piano
931	931	(1835)	XX, 9 No. 548	IV, 14	Der Wallensteiner Lanzknecht beim Trunk	He! schenket mir im Helme ein!	November; 1827	Text by Leitner
932	932	(1832)	XX, 9 No. 549	IV, 14	Der Kreuzzug	Ein Münich steht in seiner Zell	November; 1827	Text by Leitner
933	933	(1835)	XX, 9 No. 550	IV, 14	Des Fischers Liebesglück	Dort blinket durch Weiden	November; 1827	Text by Leitner
934	934	159p (1850)	VIII; No. 5	VI, 8 No. 8	Fantasy, D 934	C major	December; 1827	For violin and piano; Reuses music of D 741
935	935	142p (1839)	XI No. 3	VII/2, 5 & Anh.	Impromptus Nos. 5–8	F minor – A♭ major – B♭ major – F minor	December; 1827	For piano; 7th Impromptu reuses music of D 797
936	936	(1892)	XVII; No. 15	III, 2a No. 16	Kantate für Irene Kiesewetter a.k.a. Cantate zur Feier der Genesung der Irene Kiesewetter	Al par del ruscelletto chiaro	26/12/1827	for ttbbSATB and piano duet

== Sources ==
Multi-volume editions, websites and catalogues

- Alte Gesamt-Ausgabe (AGA) = Franz Schubert's Works: Schubert, Franz (1884–1897). Johannes Brahms; Ignaz Brüll; Anton Door; Julius Epstein; Johann Nepomuk Fuchs; Josef Gänsbacher; Joseph Hellmesberger Sr.; Eusebius Mandyczewski (eds.). Franz Schubert's Werke: Kritisch durchgesehene Gesammtausgabe (in German). Leipzig: Breitkopf & Härtel. Reprints of several volumes by Kalmus and Dover Publications; Franz Schubert's Werke (Series I–XIX and XXI), Series XX, Revisionsbericht: Scores at the International Music Score Library Project
- Deutsch catalogue (D) = Schubert Thematic Catalogue:
  - Deutsch, Otto Erich; et al. (Donald R. Wakeling) (1951). Schubert: Thematic Catalogue of all his Works in Chronological Order (1st ed.). London: Dent. 1995 reprint, with errata correction: Deutsch, Otto Erich; et al. (Donald R. Wakeling) (1995). The Schubert Thematic Catalogue (Dover ed.). Mineola, N.Y.: Dover Publications. ISBN 0486286851.
  - Deutsch, Otto Erich (1978). Walther Dürr; Arnold Feil; Christa Landon [in German]; Werner Aderhold (eds.). Franz Schubert: Thematisches Verzeichnis seiner Werke in chronologischer Folge. New Schubert Edition (in German). Kassel: Bärenreiter. ISBN 9783761805718. ISMN 9790006305148.
    - Series VIII (Supplement)
    - Volume 4
- Hoboken catalogue (Hob.): "Joseph Haydn (1732–1809): Werke sortiert nach Hob (Hoboken-Verzeichnis, 1957-78)" (in German). Kaiserslautern: Klassika.
- Köchel catalogue (K.): "Wolfgang Amadeus Mozart (1756–1791): Werke sortiert nach KV^{6} (Köchel-Verzeichnis, 6. Auflage, 1964)" (in German). Kaiserslautern: Klassika.
- Neue Schubert-Ausgabe (NSA) = New Schubert Edition:
  - NSA scores: Schubert, Franz (1968–2019). International Schubert Association (Tübingen) (ed.). Franz Schubert (1797–1828): New Edition of the Complete Works (in German). Kassel: Bärenreiter. [over 80 volumes in eight series] Individual volumes:
    - NSA II, 15: Schubert, Franz; Neumann, Johann Philipp (2008). Jahrmärker, Manuela; Aigner, Thomas (eds.). Sacontala. New Schubert Edition (in German). Kassel: Bärenreiter. ISMN 9790006497294.
      - Series II (Stage Works), Vol. 15
    - NSA VIII, 4: See above Deutsch (1978)
  - NSA website: "New Schubert Edition". Tübingen: International Schubert Association.
- Schubert Online: "www.schubert-online.at: Schubert music manuscripts, first and early editions online". Vienna: Austrian Academy of Sciences (ÖAW).
- The LiederNet Archive: Ezust, Emily; et al. (LiederNet contributors). "Composer: Franz Peter Schubert (1797 - 1828)". Ontario: LiederNet Corporation.

Other

- Badura-Skoda, Eva; Branscombe, Peter, eds. (2008). Schubert Studies: Problems of Style and Chronology. Cambridge University Press. ISBN 0521088720.
  - Walther Dürr "Schubert's Songs and Their Poetry" pp. 1–24
  - Rufus Hallmark "Schubert's 'Auf dem Strom'" pp. 25–46
  - Elaine Brody "Schubert and Sulzer Revisited" pp. 47–60
  - Marius Flothuis "Schubert Revises Schubert" pp. 61–84
  - Elizabeth Norman McKay "Schubert as Composer of Operas" pp. 85–104
  - Peter Branscombe "Schubert and the Melodrama" pp. 105–142
  - Christoph Wolff "Schubert's 'Der Tod und dad Mädchen'" pp. 143–172
  - Peter Gülke on String Quintet D 956 pp. 173–186
  - Paul Badura-Skoda on Schubert's 'Great' C major Symphony pp. 187–208
  - Robert Winter "Paper Studies and the Future of Schubert Research" pp. 209–276
  - Eva Badura-Skoda "The Chronology of Schubert's Piano Trios" pp. 277–296
  - Reinhard Van Hoorickx "The Chronology of Schubert's Fragments and Sketches" pp. 297–326
  - Arnold Feil "Rhythm in Schubert" pp. 327–346
  - Alexander Weinmann on Leopold Puschl and Schubert's sojourn in Zseliz pp. 347–356
- Elsholz, Gunter (1982). Vogel, Reimut (ed.). Franz Schubert: Sinfonie in E-Dur 1825. Stuttgart: Goldoni. ISBN 3922044050. OCLC 987719669.
- Hilmar, Ernst; Jestremski, Margret, eds. (2004). Schubert-Enzyklopädie (in German). Vol. 1. Introduction by Alfred Brendel. Tutzing: Hans Schneider. ISBN 3795211557.
- Keefe, Simon P., ed. (2006). Mozart Studies. Cambridge University Press. ISBN 0521851025.
- Kube, Michael (2009). "Franz Schuberts Deutsche Trauermesse (D 621) als Problem der Text- und Stilkritik". In Mitterauer, Gertraud; Müller, Ulrich; Springeth, Margarete; Vitzthum, Verena (eds.). Was ist Textkritik?: Zur Geschichte und Relevanz eines Zentralbegriffs der Editionswissenschaft (in German). Walter de Gruyter. pp. 129–140. ISBN 3484970782.
- Mozart, Wolfgang Amadeus; Haydn, Joseph; Haydn, Michael (2008). Kircher, Armin (ed.). Chorbuch Mozart • Haydn VII: Kanonsammlung [Choral Collection Mozart • Haydn, Vol. VII: Canon Collection] (in German, Latin, English, and Italian). Stuttgart: Carus-Verlag. OCLC 274222567.
- Newbould, Brian (1999). Schubert: The Music and the Man. University of California Press. ISBN 0520219570.
- Reed, John (1997). The Schubert Song Companion. Manchester University Press. ISBN 1901341003.
- Van Hoorickx, Reinhard (1971). "Franz Schubert (1797–1828) List of the Dances in Chronological Order". Revue belge de Musicologie / Belgisch Tijdschrift voor Muziekwetenschap. 25 (1). Belgian Musicological Society: 68–97. doi:10.2307/3686180. ISSN 0771-6788. JSTOR 3686180.
- Van Hoorickx, Reinhard (1974–1976). "Thematic Catalogue of Schubert's Works: New Additions, Corrections and Notes". Revue belge de Musicologie / Belgisch Tijdschrift voor Muziekwetenschap. 28–30. Belgian Musicological Society: 136–171. doi:10.2307/3686053. ISSN 0771-6788. JSTOR 3686053.
