= Impromptu =

Musical form

An impromptu (/ɪmˈprɒmptjuː/, French: [ɛ̃pʁɔ̃pty], loosely meaning "offhand") is a free-form musical composition with the character of an ex tempore improvisation as if prompted by the spirit of the moment, usually for a solo instrument, such as piano. According to Allgemeine musikalische Zeitung, Johann Baptist Cramer began publishing piano pieces under the (sub-)title of "impromptu." (AMZ, Mar. No II, 1815, col. 6), which seems to be the first recorded use of the term impromptu in this sense.

== Form usage ==
Since the very concept of unpremeditated, spur-of-the-moment inspiration without studied care is at the heart of Romantic artistic theory, it did not take long before the first generation of Romantic composers took up the idea. Others were:

- Frédéric Chopin composed 4 Impromptus, including the famous Fantaisie-Impromptu.
- Jan Václav Voříšek was the first one to compose impromptus published under that title, in 1822.
- Franz Schubert published two sets of four Impromptus for piano, Op. 90 and Op. 142 (1827). After his death three more unnamed piano compositions (Klavierstücke) were sometimes named Impromptus.
- Robert Schumann wrote some Impromptus, published as Op. 5 (1833).
- Charles-Valentin Alkan composed two sets of four Impromptus, published as Op. 32 (No. 1 in 1848, and No. 2 in 1849).
- Franz Liszt composed an Impromptu in F sharp (sometimes called Nocturne) and a piano piece named Valse-Impromptu.
- Alexander Scriabin is known to have written at least nine impromptus for the piano in his early period.
- Jean Sibelius composed six impromptus for piano op. 5 (1893)

The impromptu genre remained popular all throughout the 19th century and was prominent throughout the romantic era.

In the 20th century, there are also several examples of composers naming their compositions "Impromptu", such as:

- Gabriel Fauré composing six Impromptus between 1881 and 1913.
- Richard Rodney Bennett composing five Impromptus for guitar in 1968
- Maurice Journeau composing six Impromptus between 1971 and 1974.
- Donald Martino composing Fantasies and Impromptu in 1980.
- Nikolai Kapustin composing four Impromptus between 1991 and 1997.
- Lowell Liebermann composing Three Impromptus Op.68 in 2000 and Two Impromptus Op.131 in 2016.
- Vince Mendoza's Epiphany, performed by the London Symphony Orchestra and published in 1999. The first piece of the album is named Impromptu.
- One of Queen's songs, performed at Wembley Stadium and other performances is named Impromptu.
