= Mozart's compositional method =

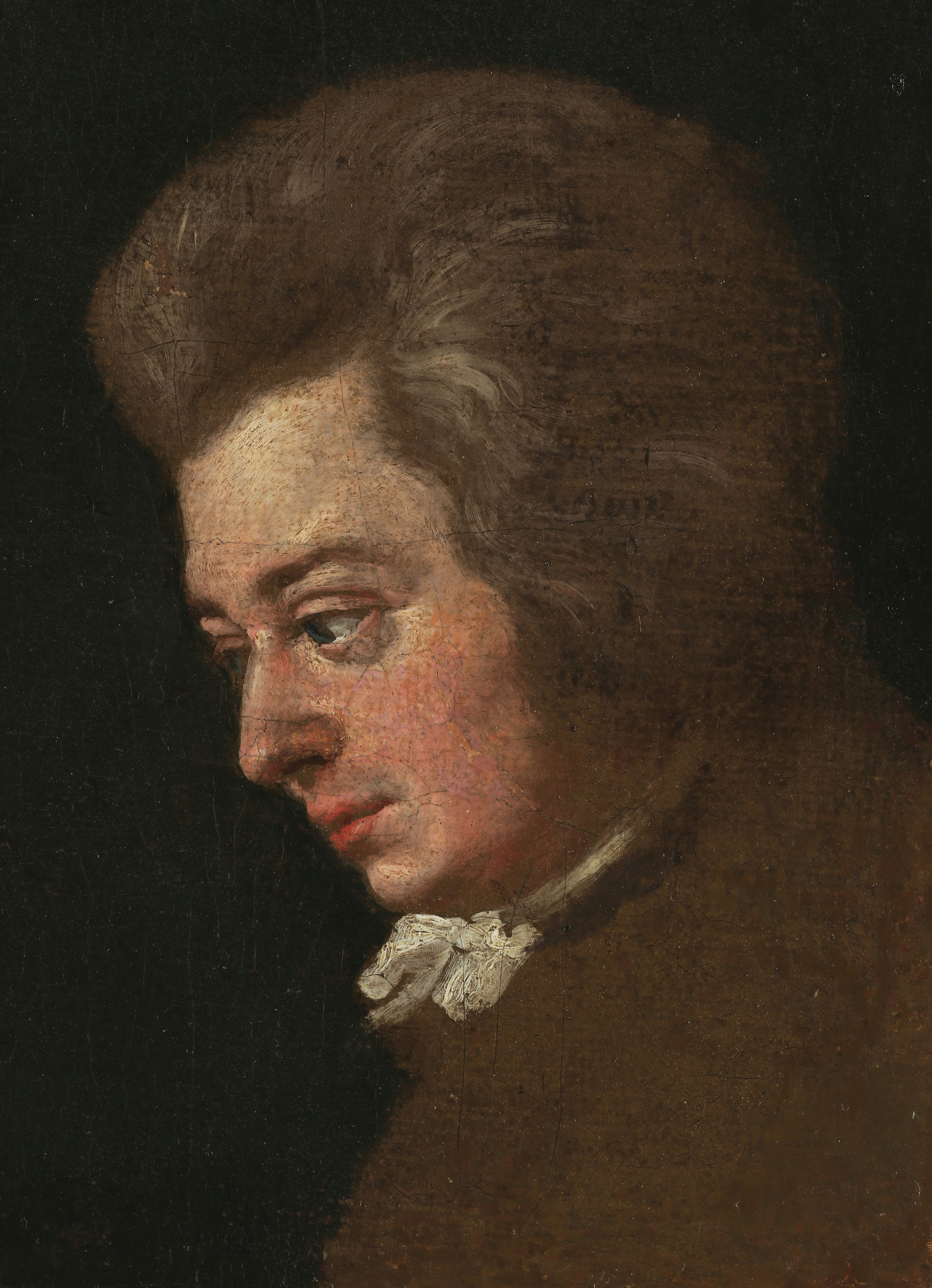
Mozart portrayed by his brother-in-law Joseph Lange

Scholars have long studied how Wolfgang Amadeus Mozart created his works. Nineteenth-century views on this topic were often based on a romantic, mythologizing conception of the process of composition. More recent scholarship addresses this issue by systematically examining authenticated letters and documents, and has arrived at rather different conclusions.

== Mozart's approach to composition ==
A surviving letter of Mozart's to his father Leopold (31 July 1778) indicates that he considered composition an active process:

You know that I plunge myself into music, so to speak—that I think about it all day long—that I like experimenting—studying—reflecting.

One cannot quite determine from these words alone whether Mozart's approach to composition was a conscious method, or more inspired and intuitive.

== Sketches ==
Mozart often wrote sketches, from small snippets to extensive drafts, for his compositions. Though many of these were destroyed by Mozart's widow Constanze, about 320 sketches and drafts survive, covering about 10 percent of the composer's work.

Ulrich Konrad, an expert on the sketches, describes a well-worked-out system of sketching that Mozart used, based on examination of the surviving documents. Typically the most "primitive" sketches are in casual handwriting, and give just snippets of music. More advanced sketches cover the most salient musical lines (the melody line, and often the bass), leaving other lines to fill in later. The so-called "draft score" was one in an advanced enough state for Mozart to consider it complete, and therefore enter it (after 1784) into the personal catalog that he called Verzeichnüss aller meiner Werke ("Catalog of all my works"). However, the draft score did not include all of the notes: it remained to flesh out the internal voices, filling out the harmony. These were added to create the completed score, which appeared in a highly legible hand.

This procedure makes sense of another letter Mozart wrote to Leopold, discussing his work in Munich on the opera Idomeneo (30 December 1780), where Mozart distinguishes "composed" from "written":

I must finish [writing this letter] now, because I've got to write at breakneck speed—everything's composed—but not written yet.

In Konrad's view, Mozart had completed the "draft score" of the work, but still needed to produce the completed, final version.

Of the sketches that survive, none are for solo keyboard works. Konrad suggests that "Improvisation [at which Mozart was highly skilled; see below] or the actual trying out of particularly challenging imaginative possibilities could compensate in these cases for the lack of sketches."

== Use of a keyboard ==
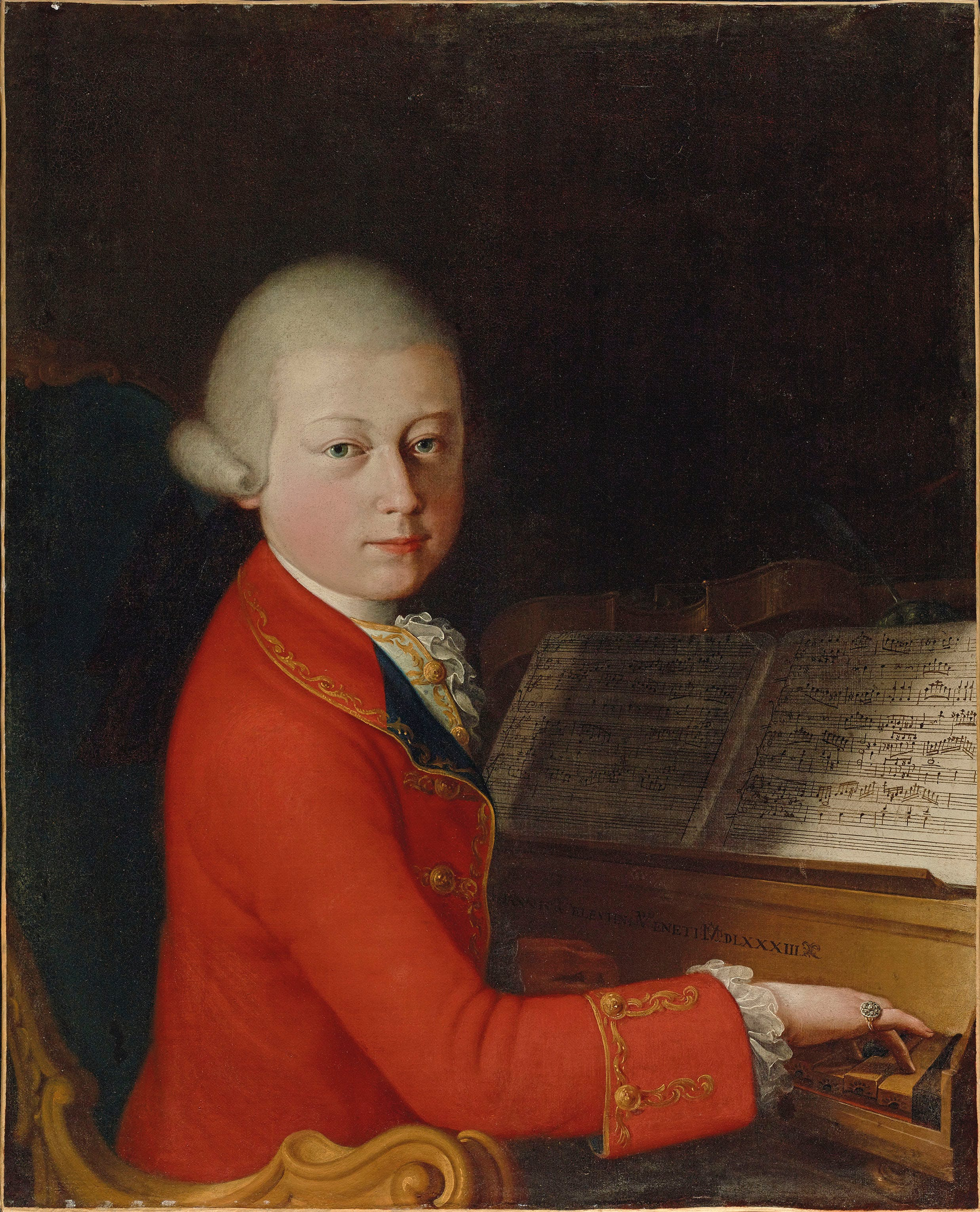
1770 Verona portrait of Mozart, which shows the composer playing a harpsichord

Mozart sometimes used a keyboard to work out his musical thoughts. This can be deduced from his letters and other biographical material. For instance, on 1 August 1781, Mozart wrote to his father Leopold concerning his living arrangements in Vienna, where he had recently moved:

My room that I'm moving to is being prepared—I'm just off now to hire a keyboard, because I can't live there until that's been delivered, especially as I've got to write just now, and there isn't a minute to be lost.

Konrad cites a similar letter written from Paris that indicates that Mozart didn't compose where he was staying, but visited another home to borrow the keyboard instrument there. Similar evidence is found in early biographies based on Constanze Mozart's memories.

On the other hand, Mozart was in fact able to compose without a keyboard, according to various sources. German musicologist Hermann Abert cited Mozart's first biographer Franz Xaver Niemetschek in his book, who originally wrote: "He never went to the keyboard when composing." Mozart's wife, Constanze, also stated the same thing and added that he "only tried out a movement when it was finished".

== Incomplete works ==
About 150 of Mozart's surviving works are incomplete, roughly a quarter of the total count of surviving works. A number of completed works can be shown (e.g., by inspecting watermarks or inks) to be completions of fragments that had long been left incomplete. These include the piano concertos K. 449, K. 488, K. 503, and K. 595, as well as the Clarinet Concerto K. 622.

It is not known why so many works were left incomplete. In a number of cases, the historical record shows that what Mozart thought was an opportunity for performance or sale evaporated during the course of composition. Braunbehrens (1990) observes: "Most pieces ... were written on request or with a specific performance in mind, if not for the composer's own use. Mozart frequently emphasized that he would never consider writing something for which there was no such occasion. Indeed, hardly a single work of his was not written for a particular occasion, or at least for use in his own concerts."

== Improvisation ==
Mozart evidently had a prodigious ability to "compose on the spot"; that is, to improvise at the keyboard. This ability was apparent even in his childhood, as the Benedictine priest Placidus Scharl recalled:

Even in the sixth year of his age he would play the most difficult pieces for the pianoforte, of his own invention. He skimmed the octave which his short little fingers could not span, at fascinating speed and with wonderful accuracy. One had only to give him the first subject which came to mind for a fugue or an invention: he would develop it with strange variations and constantly changing passages as long as one wished; he would improvise fugally on a subject for hours, and this fantasia-playing was his greatest passion.

A meeting of the composer André Grétry and the young Mozart apparently took place in 1766. Grétry recalled:

Once in Geneva I met a child who could play everything at sight. His father said to me before the assembled company: So that no doubt shall remain as to my son's talent, write for him, for to-morrow, a very difficult Sonata movement. I wrote him an Allegro in E-flat; difficult, but unpretentious; he played it, and everyone, except myself, believed that it was a miracle. The boy had not stopped; but following the modulations, he had substituted a quantity of passages for those which I had written ...

As a teenager visiting Italy, Mozart gave a concert in Venice (5 March 1771). According to a witness, "An experienced musician gave him a fugue theme, which he worked out for more than an hour with such science, dexterity, harmony, and proper attention to rhythm, that even the greatest connoisseurs were astounded."

Mozart continued to improvise in public as an adult. For instance, the highly successful concert of 1787 in Prague that premiered his "Prague Symphony" concluded with a half-hour improvisation by the composer. For other instances, see Mozart's Berlin journey and Dora Stock.

=== Improvisation as a time-saving device ===
Braunbehrens suggests that on at least one occasion, Mozart met a deadline by simply not writing down part of the music and improvising it instead while performing before the audience. This was evidently true of the Piano Concerto in D, K. 537, premiered 24 February 1788. In this work, the second movement opens with a solo passage for the pianist. The autograph (composer-written) score of the music gives the notes as follows:

Performance
By Lili Kraus in 1955

Braunbehrens and other scholars infer that Mozart could not conceivably have opened a movement with a completely unadorned melody line, and instead improvised a suitable accompaniment for the left hand. Similar passages occur throughout the concerto.

The work was published only in 1794, three years after Mozart's death, and the publisher Johann Anton André found some other composer (whose identity is unknown) to fill in the missing passages; these interpolations have become the standard for performance.

== Mozart's memory ==
Mozart appears to have possessed an excellent memory for music, though probably not the quasi-miraculous ability that has passed into legend. In particular, the use of keyboards and sketches to compose, noted above, would not have been necessary for a composer who possessed superhuman memory. Various anecdotes attest to Mozart's memory abilities.

Two of the violin sonatas gave rise to anecdotes to the effect that Mozart played the piano part at the premiere from memory, with only the violinist playing from the music. This is true for the Violin Sonata in G, K. 379/373a, where Mozart wrote in a letter to Leopold (8 April 1781) that he wrote out the violin part in an hour the night before the performance "but in order to be able to finish it, I only wrote out the accompaniment for Brunetti and retained my own part in my head." A similar story survives that concerns the Violin Sonata in B-flat, K. 454, performed before the Emperor in the Kärntnertortheater on 29 April 1784.

One may question whether, in these instances, Mozart remembered the entire keyboard part note-for-note. Given the independent testimony (above) for his ability to fill in gaps through improvisation, it would seem that Mozart could have done this as well in performing the violin sonatas.

Another instance of Mozart's powerful memory concerns his purported memorization and transcription of Gregorio Allegri's Miserere in the Sistine Chapel as a 14-year-old. Here again, various factors suggest great skill on Mozart's part, but not a superhuman miracle. The work in question is somewhat repetitive, alternating the same four and five-part settings, and Maynard Solomon suggested that Mozart may have seen another copy earlier, but added that he "certainly had the capacity to write out the Miserere from memory". Furthermore, Mozart may have already heard the piece when he was in London in 1764-65 and thus recalled it when he heard it in Rome.

== 19th-century views ==
Konrad describes the views that were prevalent during the 19th century period of Mozart scholarship. In particular, "The 'making of music' was ... mythologized as a creative act." The 19th century regarded Mozart's compositional process as a form "of impulsive and improvisatorial composition ... an almost vegetative act of creation." Konrad states that the 19th century also mythologized Mozart's abilities in the area of musical memory.

=== The Rochlitz letter ===
An important source for earlier conceptions concerning Mozart's composition method was the work of the early 19th century publisher Friedrich Rochlitz. He propagated anecdotes about Mozart that were long assumed authentic, but with more recent research are now widely doubted. Among other things, Rochlitz published a letter, purporting to be by Mozart but now considered fraudulent, concerning his method of composition. This letter was taken as evidence concerning two points considered dubious by modern scholars. One is the idea that Mozart composed in a kind of passive mental process, letting the ideas simply come to him:

When I am, as it were, completely myself, entirely alone, and of good cheer; say traveling in a carriage, or walking after a good meal, or during the night when I cannot sleep; it is on such occasions that my ideas flow best and most abundantly. Whence and how they come I know not, nor can I force them. Those ideas that please me, I retain in ... memory, and am accustomed, as I have been told, to hum them to myself. If I continue in this way, it soon occurs to me, how I may turn this or that morsel to account, so as to make a good dish of it, that is to say, agreeably to the rules of counterpoint, to the peculiarities of the various instruments, &c.

Rochlitz's forged letter also was used in earlier study to bolster the (apparently false) story that Mozart could compose relying entirely on his memory, without the use of keyboard or sketches:

All this fires my soul, and provided I am not disturbed, my subject enlarges itself, becomes methodized and defined, and the whole, though it be long, stands almost finished and complete in my mind, so that I can survey it, like a fine picture or a beautiful statue, at a glance. Nor do I hear in my imagination the parts successively, but I hear them, as it were, all at once... When I proceed to write down my ideas, I take out of the bag of my memory, if I may use that phrase, what has previously been collected into it, in the way I have mentioned. For this reason, the committing to paper is done quickly enough, for everything is, as I said before, already finished; and it rarely differs on paper from what it was in my imagination.

The contents of the Rochlitz letter were relayed by such authorities as the mathematician Henri Poincaré and the musician Albert Lavignac and had a great influence on the popular view of Mozart's compositional process. And as late as 1952 a volume of collected papers from a symposium on the creative process reproduces the letter, albeit with a warning that "the authenticity of this letter remains in doubt".

But although it has been influential in historical conceptions of Mozart, the letter has more recently not been regarded as an accurate description of Mozart's compositional process. On the other hand, there is still no reason to suppose that even if Rochlitz did forge the letter, he would have wanted to misrepresent what he knew of Mozart's actual compositional practice any more than he would have wanted to misrepresent his handwriting. Moreover, in direct support of Rochlitz's account, Mozart's first biographer, in collaboration with Mozart's wife, related a congruent description of how Mozart composed:

Mozart wrote everything with a facility and rapidity, which perhaps at first sight could appear as carelessness or haste; and while writing he never came to the klavier. His imagination presented the whole work, when it came to him, clearly and vividly. ... In the quiet repose of the night, when no obstacle hindered his soul, the power of his imagination became incandescent with the most animated activity, and unfolded all the wealth of tone which nature had placed in his spirit ... Only the person who heard Mozart at such times knows the depth and the whole range of his musical genius: free and independent of all concern his spirit could soar in daring flight to the highest regions of art.

== Notes ==
Sources

- Braunbehrens, Volkmar (1990). Mozart in Vienna: 1781–1791. New York: Grove Weidenfeld.
- Deutsch, Otto Erich (1965). Mozart: A Documentary Biography. Stanford, California: Stanford University Press.
- Irving, John (2006). "Sonatas". In Cliff Eisen; Simon P. Keefe (eds.). The Cambridge Mozart Encyclopedia. Cambridge: Cambridge University Press.
- Keefe, Simon P. (2006). "Rochlitz, (Johann) Friedrich". In Cliff Eisen; Simon P. Keefe (eds.). The Cambridge Mozart Encyclopedia. Cambridge: Cambridge University Press.
- Konrad, Ulrich (2006). "Compositional method". In Cliff Eisen; Simon P. Keefe (eds.). The Cambridge Mozart Encyclopedia. Cambridge: Cambridge University Press.
- Niemetschek, Franz (1798). Leben des K.K. Kapellmeisters Wolfgang Gottlieb Mozart, nach Originalquellen beschrieben (in German).
- Solomon, Maynard (1995). Mozart: A Life. New York: Harper Perennial.
- Zaslaw, Neal (1994). "Mozart as a working stiff". In James M. Morris (ed.). On Mozart. Cambridge University Press. An influential assertion of the practicality of Mozart's motivations in composition, attacking older conceptions as romanticized and unrealistic.
