= Op. 142 =

In music, Op. 142 stands for Opus number 142. Compositions that are assigned this number include:

- Schubert – Four Impromptus, D. 935
- Schumann – 4 Gesänge
- Shostakovich – String Quartet No. 14
