= Allgemeine musikalische Zeitung =

German music periodical

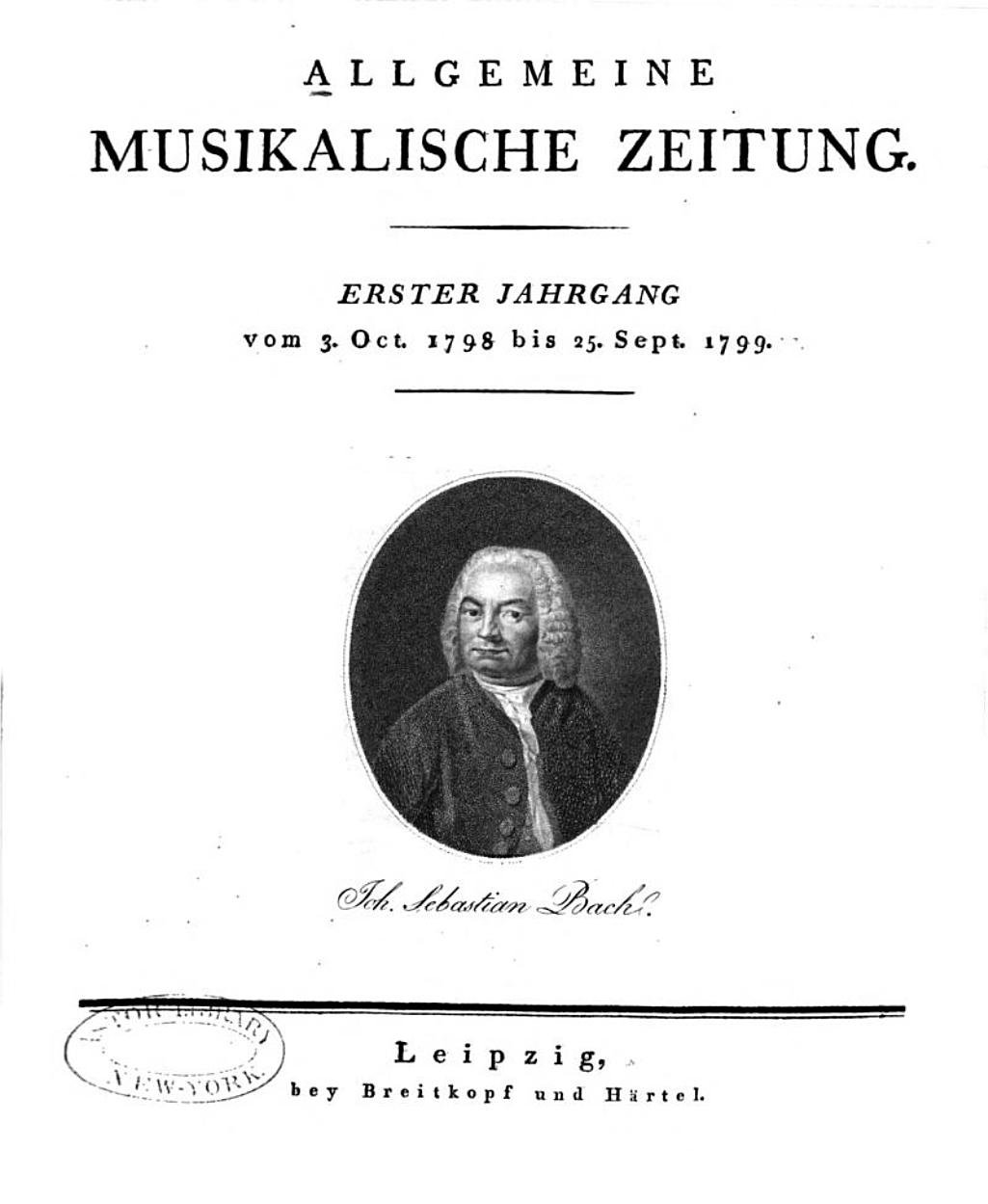
Title page of the first volume, showing a portrait of J. S. Bach

The Allgemeine musikalische Zeitung (General music newspaper) was a German-language periodical published in the 19th century. Comini (2008) has called it "the foremost German-language musical periodical of its time". It reviewed musical events taking place in many countries, focusing on the German-speaking nations, but also covering France, Italy, Russia, Britain, and even occasionally America.

Its impartiality and adherence to basic principles of credibility and discretion regarding the personal position of those reviewed, assured and established itself in a high position as a periodical in the musical German society of the time, exercising great influence on the period.

== History ==
The periodical appeared in two series: a weekly magazine published between 1798 and 1848, and a revived version which lasted from 1866 to 1882. The publisher was Breitkopf & Härtel in Leipzig for the first period of publication and for the first three years of the second period; for the remainder of the periodical's history it was published by J. Reiter-Biedermann. For a time during the second era it went by the title Leipziger Allgemeine musikalische Zeitung ("AmZ of Leipzig").

Much important material appeared in the magazine, including the serialized first version of Georg August Griesinger's biography of Joseph Haydn, and articles by scholar Gustav Nottebohm and critic Eduard Hanslick. The journal employed the famous critic E. T. A. Hoffmann and published his influential review of Beethoven's Fifth Symphony. Both Robert Schumann and Franz Liszt published in the journal.

Somewhat less to its credit, the magazine also published the so-called "Rochlitz anecdotes," a series of vignettes about Wolfgang Amadeus Mozart written by the first editor. Today these anecdotes are widely considered to be heavily contaminated by material coming entirely from Rochlitz's own imagination (see Biographies of Mozart and Mozart's compositional method).

=== Editors ===
The editors of the Allgemeine musikalische Zeitung during its first 50-year period were:

- Johann Friedrich Rochlitz, for the first twenty years; he continued to contribute material for another seventeen.
- Gottfried Christoph Härtel, the owner of the journal's publishing house, anonymously taking on editorship of the journal for ten years
- Gottfried Wilhelm Fink, who edited for fourteen years
- Carl Ferdinand Becker, a Leipzig organist, in 1842
- Moritz Hauptmann, cantor at St. Thomas Church, Leipzig in 1843
- a three-year hiatus without an editor
- Johann Christian Lobe, for the last two and a half years.

=== Répertoire international de la presse musicale ===
The Répertoire international de la presse musicale has published volumes on both series:

- Ole Hass, Allgemeine musikalische Zeitung 1798–1848. 14 vols. Répertoire International de la Presse Musicale (Baltimore, Maryland: RIPM, 2009).
- Karl Kügle, Allgemeine musikalische Zeitung 1863–1882. 7 vols. Répertoire International de la Presse Musicale (Ann Arbor, Michigan: UMI, 1995.

The Allgemeine musikalische Zeitung is not to be confused with the Berliner allgemeine musikalische Zeitung, a different musical journal which was published in Berlin, or with the Wiener allgemeine musikalische Zeitung which was published in Vienna.
