= Gottfried Christoph Härtel =

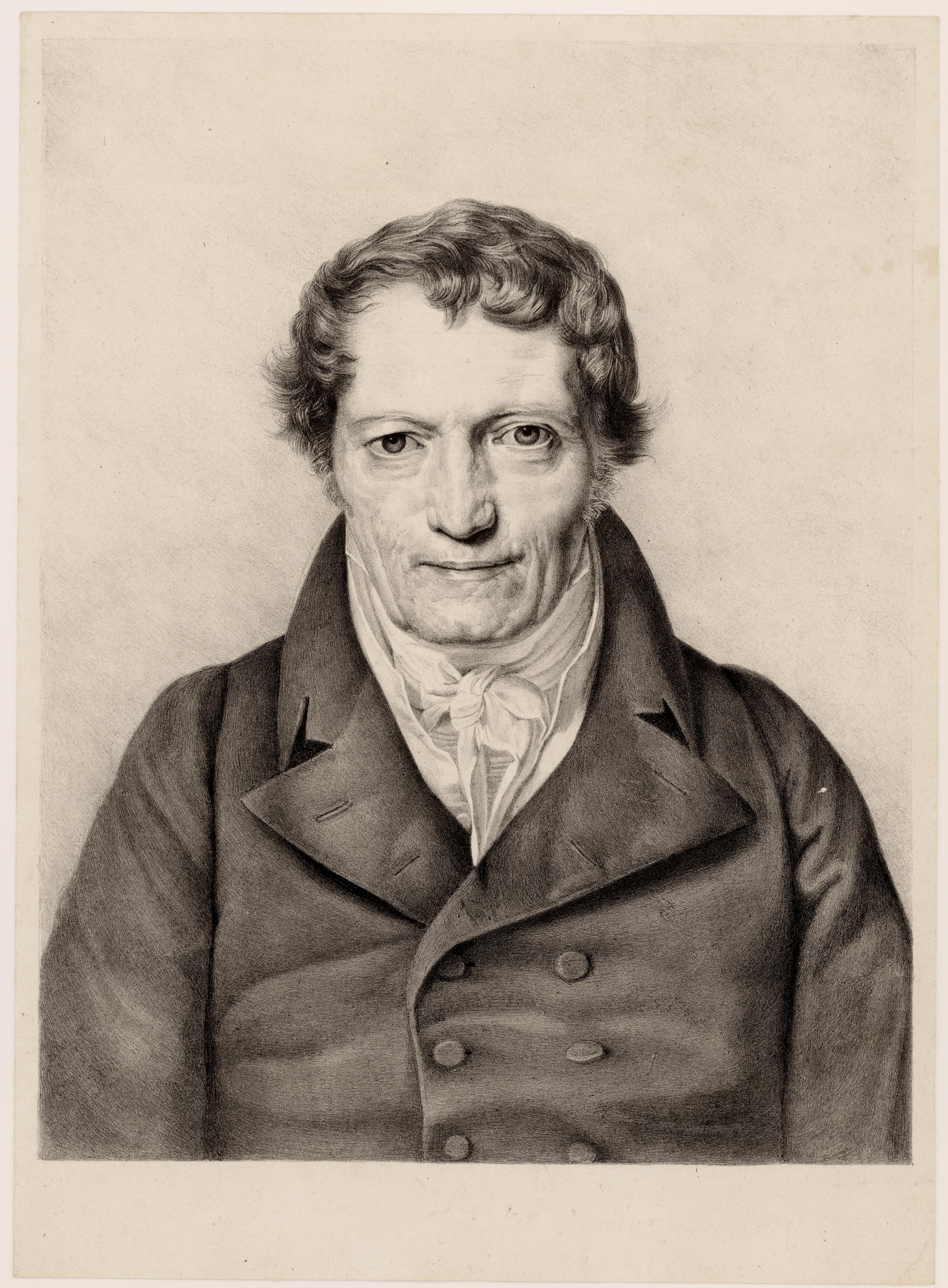
Gottfried Christoph Härtel

Gottfried Christoph Härtel (January 27, 1763 – July 25, 1827) was a music publisher in Leipzig, companion to Bernhard Christoph Breitkopf. He took over their company, Breitkopf & Härtel, in 1796 from Breitkopf, who was having financial difficulties.

Härtel was also one of the founders of the Allgemeine musikalische Zeitung (General musical newspaper), one of the most important musical journals of the 19th century, which he started in 1798, along with Friedrich Rochlitz.
