= Piano Concerto No. 25 (Mozart) =

1786 composition by W. A. Mozart

- by W. A. Mozart
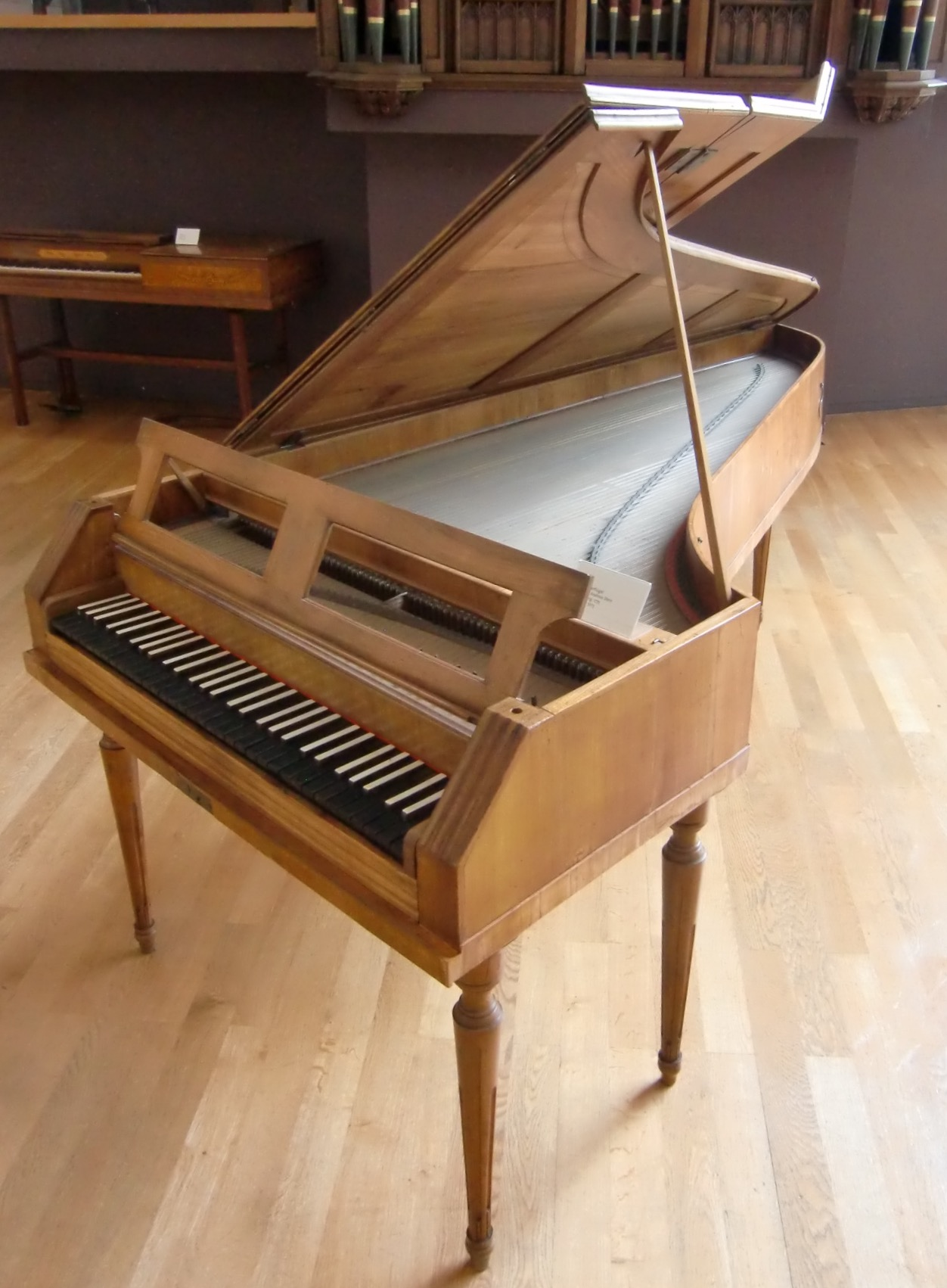
- Fortepiano by Johann Andreas Stein (Augsburg, 1775) – Berlin Musical Instrument Museum
- Key: C major
- Catalogue: K. 503
- Composed: 1786
- Movements: Three (Allegro maestoso, Andante, Allegretto)
- Scoring: Piano; orchestra

The Piano Concerto No. 25 in C major, K. 503, was completed by Wolfgang Amadeus Mozart on 4 December 1786, alongside the Prague Symphony, K. 504. Two more concertos (No. 26, K. 537 and No. 27, K. 595) followed, but this work is the last of what are considered the 12 great piano concertos written in Vienna between 1784 and 1786. Chronologically the work is the 21st of Mozart's 23 original piano concertos.

K. 503 is now widely recognized "by common consent" as "one of Mozart's greatest masterpieces in the concerto genre", but it was long neglected in favor of Mozart's other "more brilliant" concertos, such as No. 21, K. 467. Though Mozart performed it on several occasions, it was not performed again in Vienna until after his death, and it gained acceptance in the standard repertoire only in the later part of the 20th century. It was one of seven of Mozart's concertos his pupil Johann Nepomuk Hummel arranged for chamber music ensemble.

== Music ==
I. Allegro maestoso

II. Andante

III. Allegretto
Rudolf Serkin, Cleveland Orchestra, George Szell, 1955

The concerto is scored for solo piano, flute, two oboes, two bassoons, two horns in C, two trumpets in C, timpani and strings. It is one of Mozart's longest concertos, with average performance durations of 29–33 minutes.

The concerto has the following three movements:

1. Allegro maestoso, 4/4
2. Andante in F major, 3/4
3. Allegretto, 2/2

The C major concerto is frequently compared to Mozart's Jupiter Symphony; Eric Blom writes that the concerto "reveals a concentration of workmanship and a grandeur which make it the counterpart to the Jupiter Symphony among the concertos". Girdlestone considers its closest parallel to be the String Quintet in C, K. 515.

The expansive first movement (in sonata form) is one of Mozart's most symphonic concerto movements. This movement subtly slips in and out of the minor several times. One of the movement's secondary themes is a march that often reminds people of "La Marseillaise" and may have been an inspiration for the soon to be written "La Marseillaise". This theme dominates the development section. Beethoven references this concerto in his own Fourth Piano Concerto. In addition, the famous motif in the first movement of Beethoven's Fifth Symphony resembles one found in this concerto. Also, Mozart's Symphony No. 25 and Beethoven's 5th concerti have a strong march-like theme in the first movement that is first played in minor and then reappears in major.

The tranquil second movement is in sonata form but lacks a development section. It extensively uses the winds.

The third movement is a sonata-rondo that opens with a gavotte theme from Mozart's opera Idomeneo. Girdlestone considers this movement very serious-minded. Like the first movement, it touches upon the minor, but it ends assuredly and joyfully.

== Critical reception ==
In 1798, music critic Johann Friedrich Rochlitz called K. 503 "the most magnificent and difficult of all [Mozart's] hitherto known concertos" and "[maybe] the most magnificent of all the concertos which have ever been written."

According to Simon P. Keefe, K. 503 is now regarded "by common consent one of Mozart's greatest masterpieces in the concerto genre." It is often viewed as a "kindred spirit" or "the rival and the complement" of Mozart's great C minor piano concerto, K. 491, completed a few months earlier. Keefe mentions and quotes Donald Tovey, Cuthbert Girdlestone, and Alfred Einstein as among the musicologists who uphold K. 503 as exemplary.

== Notes ==
=== Sources ===
- Keefe, Simon P. (2007). Mozart's Viennese Instrumental Music: A Study of Stylistic Re-invention. Boydell Press. ISBN 9781843833192.
- Mackie, P. (2021). Mozart in Motion: His Work and His World in Pieces. Farrar, Straus and Giroux.
- Steinberg, Michael (1998). The Concerto: A Listener's Guide. Oxford.
