= The Lady in the Van (soundtrack) =

The Lady in the Van: Original Motion Picture Soundtrack

Film score and Soundtrack album by George Fenton
- Released: November 6, 2015 (UK); December 11, 2015 (US)
- Recorded: April 2015
- Genre: Classical music
- Length: Unknown
- Label: Sony Classical Records

The Lady in the Van is the original soundtrack album for the 2015 film of the same name. Composed by George Fenton, it was released through Sony Classical Records, a subsidiary of Sony Music Entertainment that specialises in classical music and compositions.

== Track listing ==
All of the music not otherwise indicated was composed by George Fenton.

No.	Title	Length
1.	"Miss Shepherd's Waltz"	1:57
2.	"Moving In"	1:38
3.	"Two Women: Tango"	2:36
4.	"Re-Parking"	1:39
5.	"In Care"	0:49
6.	"The Neighbours"	1:58
7.	"Special Paint"	1:52
8.	"Collision and Confession"	3:32
9.	"Piano Concerto No. 1 in E minor, Op. 11" (Frédéric Chopin)	1:19
10.	"The New Van"	1:50
11.	"Broadstairs"	1:11
12.	"Impromptu No. 3 in G-flat major, Op. 90, D. 899" (Franz Schubert)	2:14
13.	"Curtain Down"	2:59
14.	"Alive and Well"	0:52
15.	"Freewheeling"	1:11
16.	"The Day Centre"	2:10
17.	"A Sepulchre"	2:56
18.	"Remembering Miss Shepherd"	0:53
19.	"Walk Through the Cemetery"	2:18
20.	"The Ascension (Miss Shepherd's Waltz)"	3:29
21.	"Impromptu No. 3 in G-flat major, Op. 90, D. 899" (Schubert; feat. Clare Hammond)	6:27
22.	"Piano Concerto No. 1 in E minor, Op. 11: II. Romanze: Larghetto" (Chopin)	9:59
23.	"Piano Concerto No. 1 in E minor, Op. 11: III: Rondo: Vivace" (Chopin)	2:27
Total length:		58:16
