= Gottfried Wilhelm Fink =

German composer and musicologist

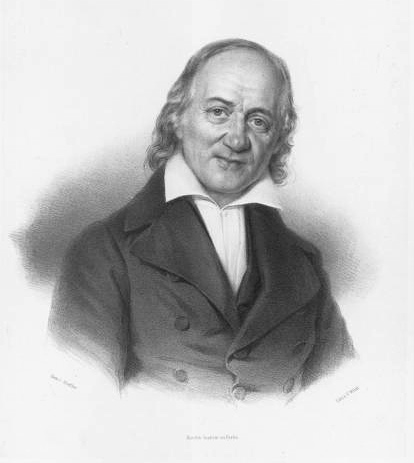
- Gottfried Wilhelm Fink (bust by Carl Wildt)
- Born: 8 March 1783; Sulza, Holy Roman Empire
- Died: 27 August 1846 (aged 63); Leipzig, Kingdom of Saxony
- Education: University of Leipzig
- Occupations: Composer; Music theorist Poet; Clergyman

Gottfried Wilhelm Fink (8 March 1783 – 27 August 1846) was a German composer, music theorist, poet, and a Protestant clergyman.

== Life ==
From 1804 until 1808 Fink studied theology at the University of Leipzig where he joined the Corps Lusatia. There he made his first attempts at composition and poetry. Most of his song compositions are attributed to this period. From 1811 he held the office of vicar in Leipzig for some years, where he also founded an educational institution which he led until 1829. Since the beginning of the 19th century he worked for the Allgemeine musikalische Zeitschrift ("General musical magazine"). In 1827 he became the magazine's editor-in-chief, a position he held for 15 years.

From 1838 Fink worked as a lecturer at the University of Leipzig. In 1841 he became a Privatdozent of musicology at the university. In the same year he became a member of the Prussian Academy of Arts in Berlin and a year later he was appointed the music director of the university.

Fink was highly appreciated throughout his life as a music theorist and composer. Numerous honors and awards were bestowed on him at home as well as abroad. In 1838, the Faculty of Philosophy at Leipzig University awarded him an honorary doctorate.

His compositions consist mainly of songs, song collections, and ballads. He wrote the lyrics for most of his song compositions himself. He also made a name for himself as the author of important works on music theory and music history. However, he was best known as the editor of the Musikalischer Hausschatz der Deutschen ("Musical house treasure of Germans"), a collection of about 1,000 songs and chants, as well as the Deutsche Liedertafel ("German song board"), a collection of polyphonic songs sung by men.

== Works ==
=== Compositions ===
- Häusliche Andachten in christlichen mehrstimmigen Liedern (Domestic devotions in Christian polyphonic songs)
- Romanzen und Balladen (Romances and ballads)
- Volkslieder mit und ohne Klavierbegleitung (Folk songs with and without piano accompaniment)
- Kindergesangbuch (Children's hymns)

=== Writings ===
- Musikalische Grammatik oder theoretisch-praktischer Unterricht in der Tonkunst (Musical grammar or theoretical-practical classes in music)
- Die Umwelt des Alten Testaments (The environment of the Old Testament)
- System der musikalische Harmonielehre (System of musical harmony)
- Der musikalische Hauslehrer oder theoretisch-praktische Anleitung (The theoretical and practical guide for the music teacher)
- Musikalische Kompositionslehre (Theory of musical composition)
