= Ständchen, D 920 (Schubert) =

Lied composed by Franz Schubert

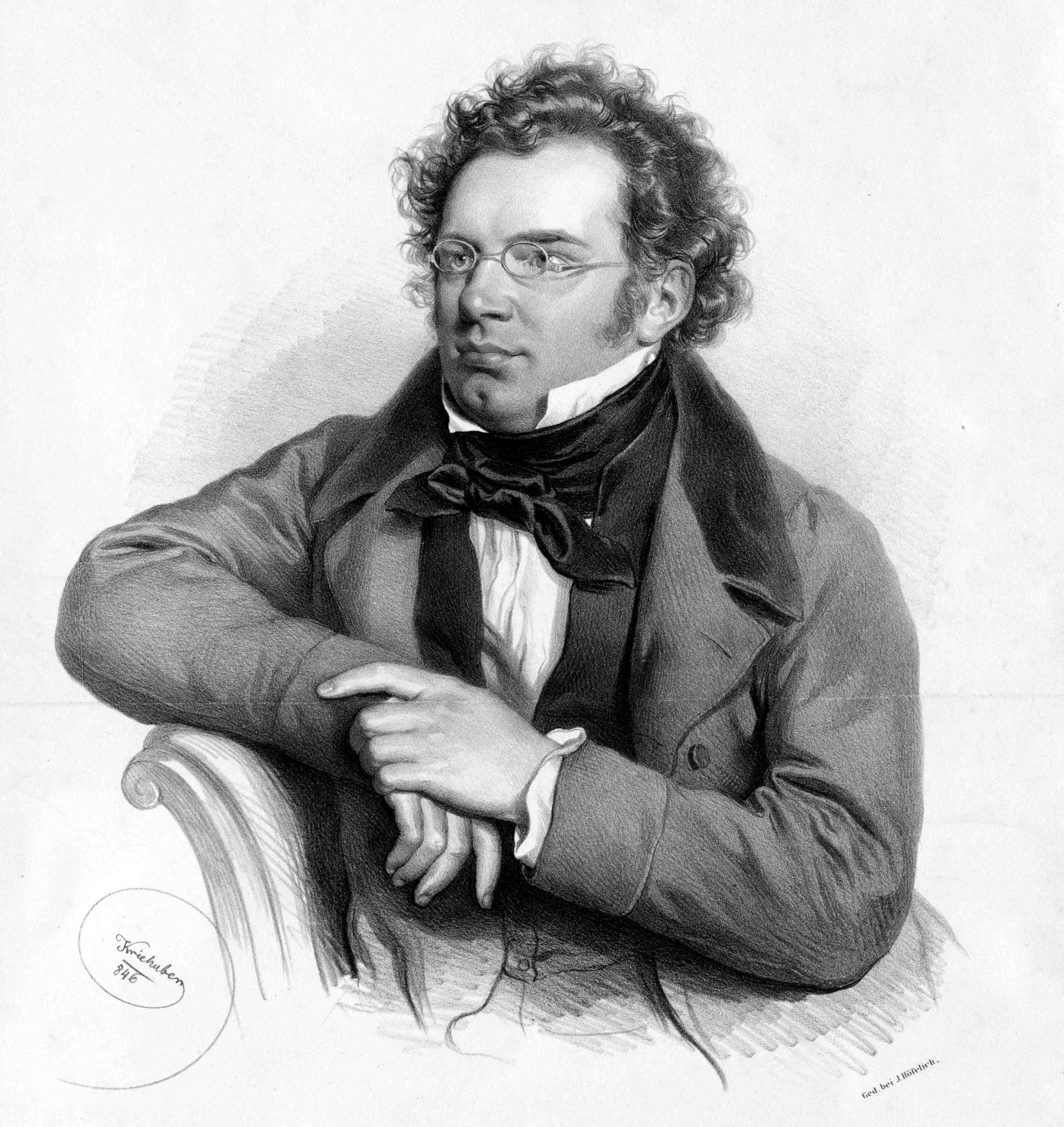
Posthumous lithograph of Franz Schubert by Joseph Kriehuber

"Ständchen", D 920/921 (also known as "Notturno") is a part song for alto solo, chorus, and piano by Franz Schubert. He composed it in Vienna in July 1827, setting words by Franz Grillparzer ("Zögernd leise, in des Dunkels nächt'ger Hülle").

Schubert wrote two versions, for male and female chorus, originally catalogued as:

- D 920, for alto solo, TTBB chorus & piano
- D 921, for alto solo, SSAA chorus & piano, Op. 135(p)

The latest update of Deutsch's catalogue places both versions under D 920, and D 921 is no longer used.

== History ==
The poem which Schubert set was specially commissioned from Franz Grillparzer by Anna Fröhlich, a singing teacher in Vienna, to celebrate the birthday (or name-day) of her pupil Louise Gosmar. Fröhlich showed Grillparzer's poem to Schubert and asked him to set it to music, who obliged within a few days with the version for mezzo-soprano and men's voices (D. 920 in Otto Deutsch's chronological catalogue).

However, Fröhlich was unhappy because she wanted a setting for Gosmar to sing with her female friends. So Schubert swiftly produced a re-scored version with SSAA chorus, D. 921. The composer failed to turn up at the public performance and had to be fetched from a nearby beer-house.

Schubert only set two other poems by Grillparzer: "Bertas Lied in der Nacht", D 653, and "Mirjams Siegesgesang", D 942.

== Manuscripts and publication ==
The version with women's choir was published in 1839 or 1840 by Anton Diabelli, as "Ständchen", Op. [posth.] 135. The title may be Diabelli's own: the extant autograph of D 920 (men's choir version, July 1827) is headed 'Chor mit Alt=Solo / Gedicht von Grillparzer'.

== See also ==
- List of compositions by Franz Schubert
- Schubert opus/Deutsch number concordance
