= Impromptus, Op. 142 (Schubert) =

1839 set of four musical works for solo piano

Four Impromptus
- Impromptu by Franz Schubert
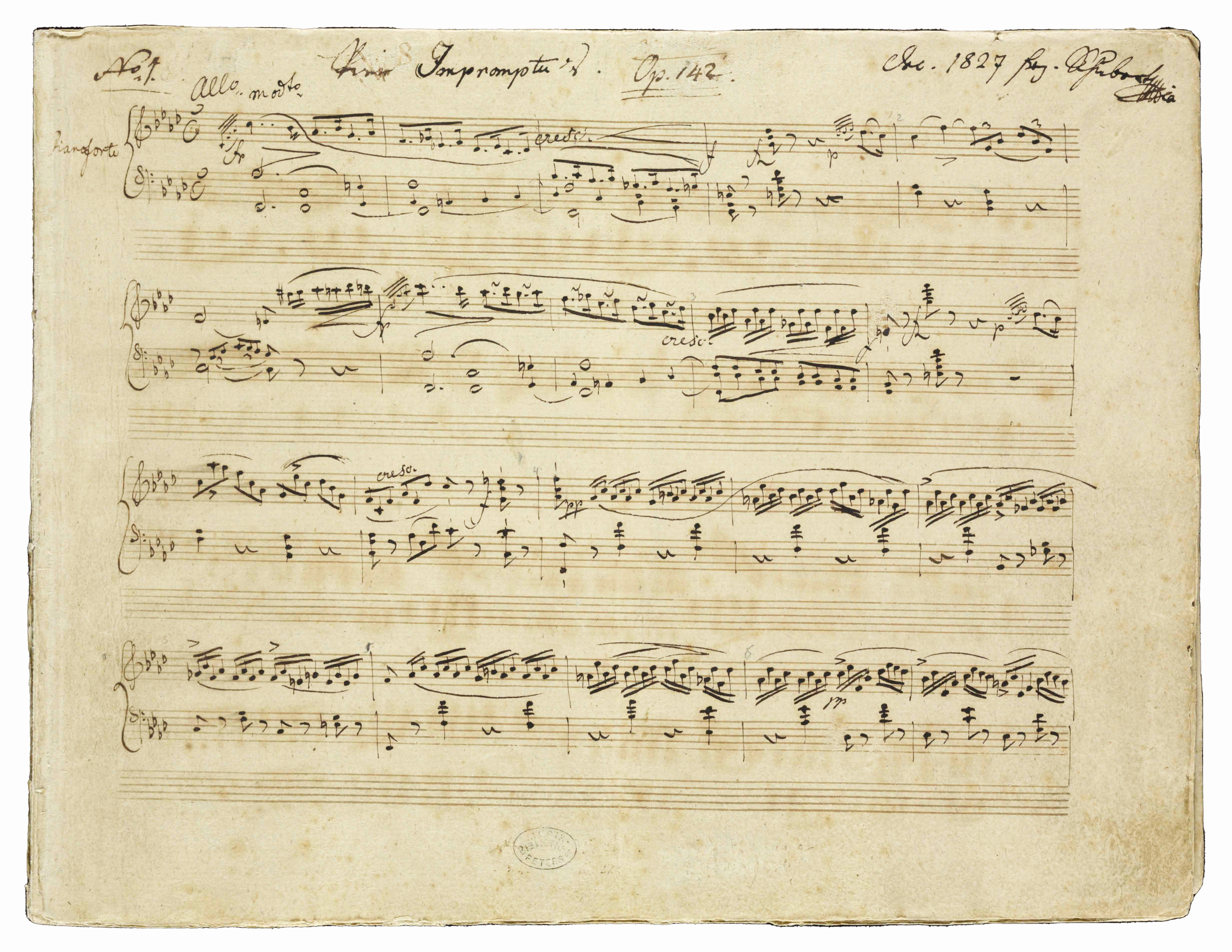
- Manuscript
- Catalogue: D. 935
- Opus: 142
- Composed: 1827
- Published: 1839

The Impromptus, Op. posth. 142, D. 935, are a set of four impromptus for solo piano composed by Franz Schubert in 1827. They were written in the same year as the Impromptus, Op. 90, but were not published until 1839, more than a decade after his death. Together with the preceding set, they have become a cornerstone of the piano repertoire.

The first Impromptu in F minor follows the form of a sonata exposition and recapitulation. The second Impromptu in A♭ major is written in the standard minuet form. The third Impromptu in B♭ major is a theme with variations. Finally, the fourth Impromptu in F minor is highly virtuosic and the most technically demanding of the set. Due to their structural and thematic links, some envisioned the four Impromptus as parts of a multi-movement sonata, a conjecture which is subject of debate among musicologists and scholars.

== Background ==
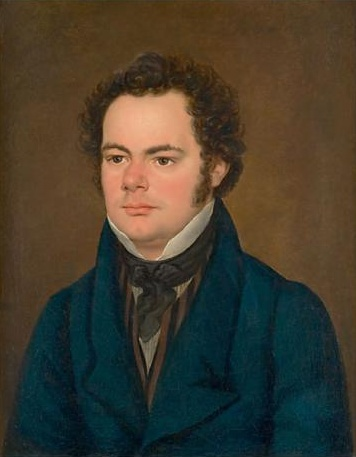
Portrait of Schubert (1827)

Schubert was a prolific composer, and despite his personal struggles, he produced a plethora of works in the late 1820s. The Impromptus were composed during a particularly creative period in 1827, which included the Piano Trio No. 1, Piano Trio No. 2, the Impromptus, Op. 90, the Fantasy for violin and piano and some 30 other works.

The Impromptus were part of the broader Romantic trend of composing short, self-contained piano pieces, a genre popularized in the 1820s. Other composers such as Johann Baptist Cramer, Carl Czerny, Heinrich Marschner, Ignaz Moscheles and Franz Liszt also wrote Impromptus published around this time, though Schubert's clearly structured Impromptus largely do not conform to the improvisational traits implied by the literary term "impromptu".

The autograph of the Impromptus, Op. 142 is dated to December 1827, and they were first mentioned in a letter from Schubert to the publisher Schott in February 1828. There is no documentary record of the first performance, though it is likely that they were first performed at a house concert in Vienna in early 1828 by Carl Maria von Bocklet, who had also premiered the Piano Trio No. 2.

Schubert had difficulty getting the Impromptus, Op. 142 published. His publisher Tobias Haslinger had already published two other Impromptus (Nos. 1 and 2 from Op. 90) and was not interested in the new set. Similarly, they were rejected in October 1828 by Schott as being too difficult and therefore "unmarketable in France". The work was published posthumously in 1839 by Anton Diabelli in Vienna.

== Structure ==
=== No. 1 in F minor ===
No. 1 in F minor
Performed by Chiara Bertoglio

The first Impromptu is an Allegro moderato in F minor. The first half of this piece has the structure of a sonata exposition that leads to an expressive dialogue between treble and bass in A♭ minor and A♭ major, with an arpeggiated accompaniment in the middle register. All of this material is then recapitulated in F minor and F major before the piece concludes in F minor.

=== No. 2 in A♭ major ===
No. 2 in A♭ major

The second Impromptu (Allegretto) is written in the standard minuet form. Its main section features a melody with chordal accompaniment. The opening bars of the melody are highly reminiscent of a similar theme from the opening of Beethoven's Piano Sonata in A♭, Opus 26. Alfred Einstein has mentioned another similar theme by Beethoven – in the third movement of the Piano Trio, Op. 70, No. 2. The middle section of the Impromptu, marked Trio as standard in minuets, is contrasted in character with the main section. It is written in D♭ major, and features continuous triplet motion. The second part of the Trio moves to D♭ minor (written in the same key signature but with accidentals added), then climaxes on A major (written without a key signature), fortissimo, and finally calms down and repeats the major-mode first phrase.

=== No. 3 in B♭ major ===
No. 3 in B♭ major

The third Impromptu (Andante) in B♭ major is a theme with variations. The main theme resembles a theme from the incidental music that Schubert composed for the play Rosamunde, which also appears in the second movement of his 13th string quartet. The variations follow the classic pattern utilized and developed by Beethoven – elements include increasing subdivision and ornamentation, and a modulation prior to a return to the tonic for the final full variation – see the Arietta of Beethoven's Op. 111, and most prominently, the Diabelli Variations. Like the variations movement in the Trout Quintet, this modulation is achieved by following a tonic-minor variation with one in the flat submediant, following which a brief free passage modulates back to the tonic.

=== No. 4 in F minor ===
No. 4 in F minor

The fourth Impromptu (Allegro scherzando) displays Schubert's rhythmic vitality and unpredictable accentuation. Its contrasting middle section reaches a climax in scale passages for both hands, culminating in a swift, four-octave descent in A major across the entire keyboard. Schubert concludes the piece with a powerful, virtuosic coda employing octaves in both hands.

The work is the most technically demanding of the Impromptus, employing a wide variety of keyboard writing, including scale runs (at times in unison), arpeggios, broken chords, quick passages in thirds, and trills.

== Sonata theory ==
It is speculated that Schubert himself may have regarded the four Impromptus as a multi-movement sonata, due to their structural and thematic connections, notably by Robert Schumann and Alfred Einstein, who claim that Schubert called them Impromptus and allowed them to be individually published to enhance their sales potential. However, this claim has been disputed by contemporary musicologists such as Charles Fisk, who established important differences between the set of Impromptus and Schubert's acknowledged multi-movement works. It is also believed that the set was originally intended to be a continuation of the previous set, as Schubert originally numbered them as Nos. 5–8.

== Legacy ==
In a review published in the Neue Zeitschrift für Musik in December 1838, Robert Schumann lauded Impromptus 1, 2 and 4 as "one more beautiful memory of Schubert"; however, he dismissed the third as merely a "series of largely unremarkable variations on an equally unremarkable theme". He further remarked that would Schubert "had lived to see how people now revere him, this would have inspired him to the highest degree".

The Impromptus have since become a staple of the piano repertoire, praised for their lyrical beauty, complex structure, and expressive depth. They are emblematic of Schubert's mature style, characterized by a combination of directness and intimacy of expression, poetic sensitivity, and structural control and grandeur. They also contributed to the evolution of the genre of the short piano piece, influencing later Romantic composers.

Today, the two sets of impromptus, along with his last piano sonatas and the Wanderer Fantasy, form the core of Schubert's piano oeuvre.

== See also ==
- Impromptus (Schubert)
