= Der Graf von Gleichen =

Unfinished 1827 opera

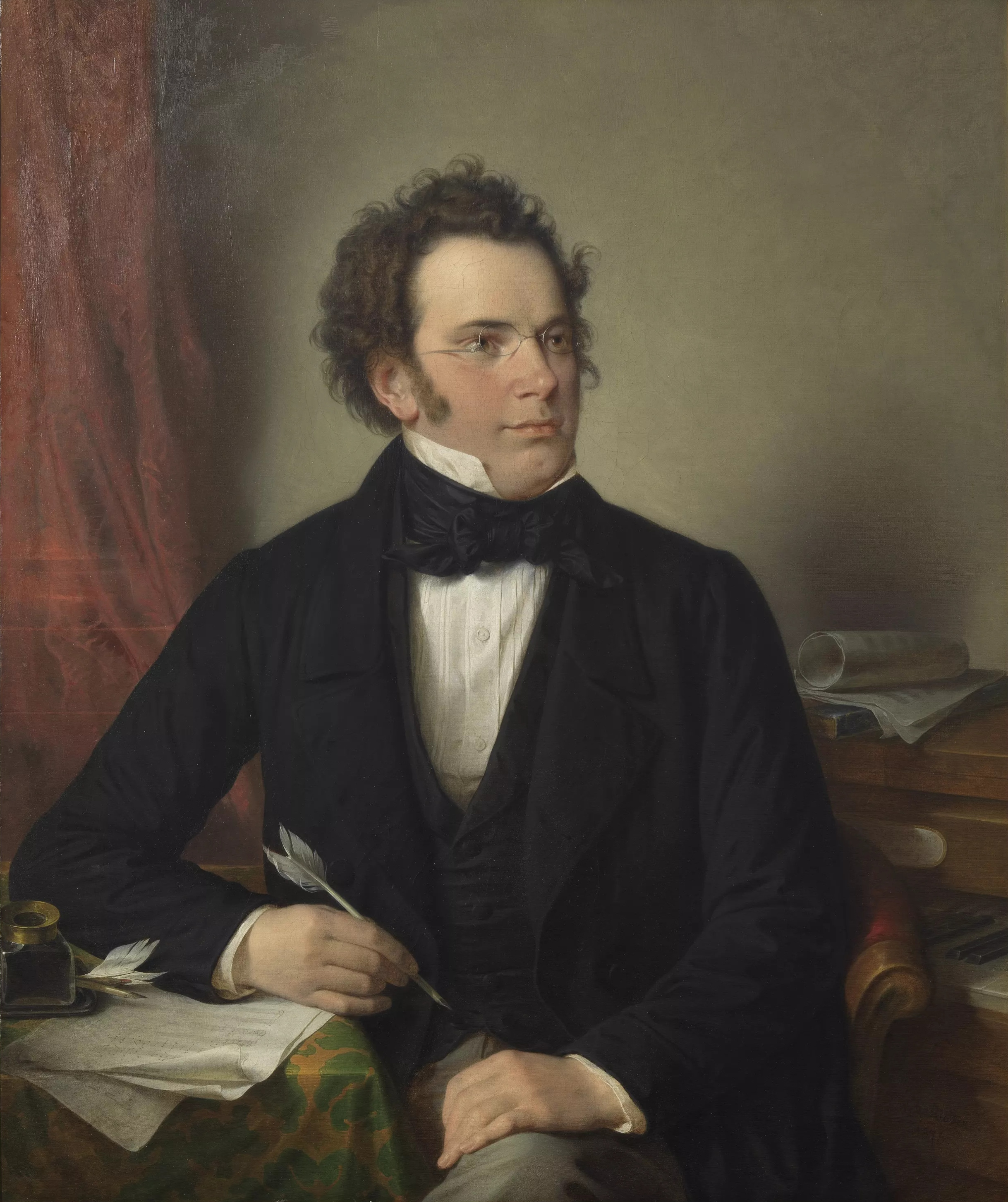
Franz Schubert

Der Graf von Gleichen D 918 is an unfinished 1827 opera in two acts by Franz Schubert after a libretto by Eduard Bauernfeld.

== Composition ==
The opera is for four sopranos, two tenors, six basses, mixed choir and orchestra. Sketches of eleven numbers for Act I and nine numbers for Act II are extant:

Akt I

1. Introduktion: Es funkelt der Morgen (sketch)
2. Rezitativ und Cavatine: O Himmel kannst du mir; Mein Weib, o Gott (sketch)
3. Terzett: Wart nur wart (sketch)
4. Duett: Ein Schiff? ein Schiff? (sketch)
5a. Arie: Ihr Blumen, ihr Bäume (sketch)
5b. Rezitativ und Duettritornell: Suleika! Mein Herr und Freund! (sketch)
5c. Duett: Ich wünscht um dich zu schmücken (sketch)
6. Marsch, Rezitativ, Arie und Chor: Ha! Was ist das? (sketch)
7. Quintett: Wie Mondlicht durch die Wolken glänzt (sketch)
8. Rezitativ und Arie: Himmel was mußt’ ich hören?; Ja ich lieb’ ihn (sketch)
9. Lied: Tausend Frauen konnt’ ich schauen (sketch)
10. Duett: Ob ich verstehe? (sketch)
11. Finale I: Sie wird kommen (sketch)

Akt II

12. Chor: Laßt uns nicht feyern (sketch)
13. Arie: Trocknet nicht Thränen der ewigen Liebe (sketch)
14. Chor: Vaterland nimm uns auf in deinen Arm (sketch)
15. Rezitativ und Arie: Burg meiner Väter; O Vater der Güte (sketch)
16a. Rezitativ und Duett mit Chor: Wo ist er?; Laß ab mir sprengts die Brust (sketch)
16b. Rezitativ und Chor: Doch sprich, wo ist mein süßer Knabe? (sketch)
17a. Terzett: Das Zeichen wars, das er versprach (sketch)
17b. Rezitativ und Quintett: Oh sieh, sie kommt; Meine Arme öffnen sich (sketch)
18. Lied mit Chor: Vor Allem müßt ihr wissen (sketch)
19. Quartett: Gratulire! nun ich habe nichts dagegen (sketch)
20a. Rezitativ und Arie: Sie schläft; Deine Liebe, deine Milde (sketch)
20b. Duett: Wohlan! Sprich zu dem frommen Kinde (sketch)
20c. Arie: Gütter Gott nimm aus dem Herzen (sketch)
20d. Rezitativ und Duett: Angelika!; Schlage nicht die Augen nieder (sketch)
20e. Terzett: Ihr seyd bewegt was ist geschehen? (sketch)
20f. Quintett: Es geht schön im Kreise der volle Pokal (sketch)

== Recordings ==
- Der Graf von Gleichen completed by Richard Dünser, following the completion occasion of the Styriarte Graz 1997, Symphonieorchester Voralberg, Christoph Eberle Oehms 2006
