= Karl Gottfried von Leitner =

Austrian author

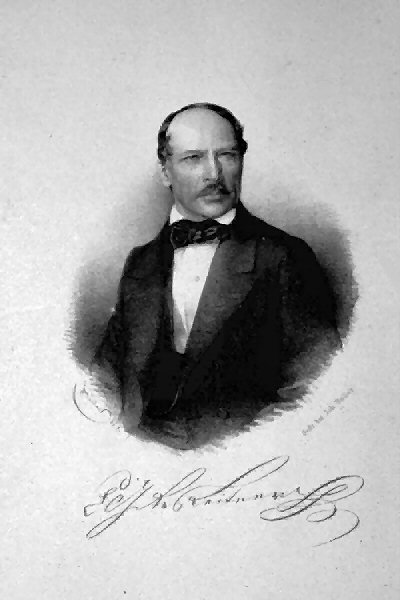
Karl Gottfried Ritter von Leitner.

Karl (or Carl) Gottfried Ritter von Leitner (November 18, 1800 – June 20, 1890) was an Austrian writer and publicist from Graz, Styria, Austria.

From 1837 to 1854 he was the first Secretary to the Estates in Styria. He was the editor of the newspaper Steiermark Zeitschrift (Styria Times). He was the curator of the Landesmuseum Joanneum (Joanneum National Museum) in Graz from 1858 to 1864, and co-founded the Historical Association for Styrian Friendship with Peter Rosegger.

Some of his ballads were set to music by Franz Schubert.
