= Impromptus, Op. 90 (Schubert) =

Set of compositions for piano by Franz Schubert

Four Impromptus
- by Franz Schubert
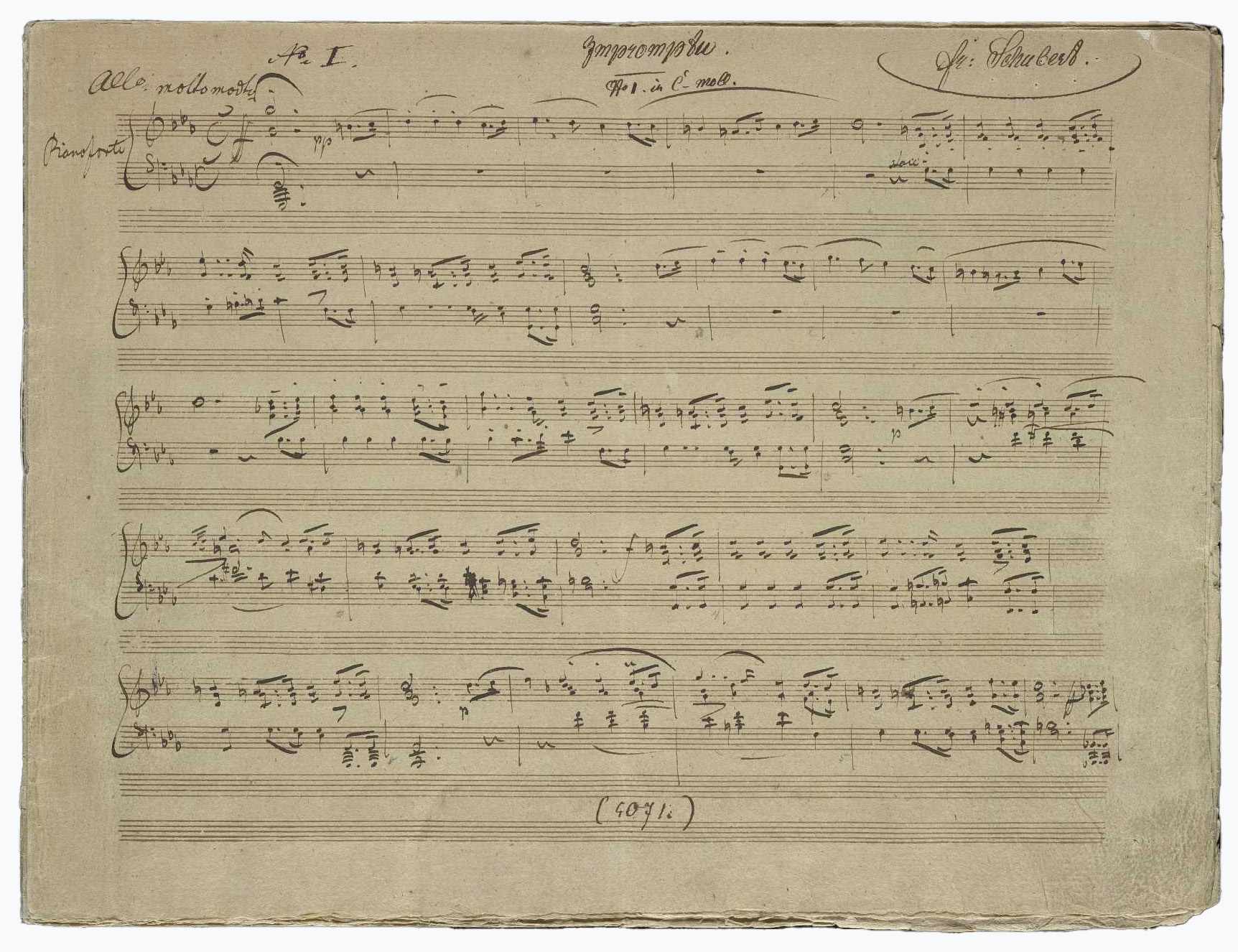
- Catalogue: D. 899
- Opus: 90
- Composed: 1827
- Published: 1827 (Nos. 1 and 2); 1857 (Nos. 3 and 4)

The Impromptus, Op. 90, D. 899, are a set of four impromptus for solo piano composed by Franz Schubert in 1827. They were written in the same year as the Impromptus, Op. 142, though only the first two pieces were published during Schubert's lifetime. Together with the latter set, they have become a cornerstone of the piano repertoire.

The first Impromptu in C minor blends elements of sonata, variation, and through-composed structures. The second Impromptu in E♭ major is a swift moto perpetuo with a ternary design. The third Impromptu is a flowing and meditative piece in G♭ major, characterized by long melodic lines and unbroken triadic accompaniment. The fourth and final Impromptu, in A♭ major, starts in A♭ minor and is characterized by cascading arpeggios and a chordal response.

== Background ==
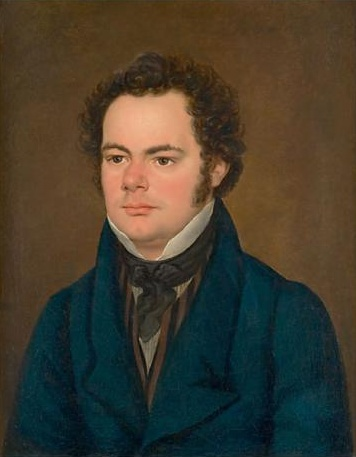
Portrait of Schubert (1827)

Schubert was a prolific composer, and despite his personal struggles, he produced a plethora of works in the late 1820s. The Impromptus were composed during a particularly creative period in 1827, which included the Piano Trio No. 1, Piano Trio No. 2, the Impromptus, Op. 142, the Fantasy for violin and piano and some 30 other works.

The Impromptus were part of the broader Romantic trend of composing short, self-contained piano pieces, a genre popularized in the 1820s. Schubert's publisher, Tobias Haslinger, assigned the title "Four Impromptus", potentially in response to the 1821 publication of similarly titled works by Bohemian composer Jan Václav Voříšek. However, other composers such as Johann Baptist Cramer, Carl Czerny, Heinrich Marschner, Ignaz Moscheles and Franz Liszt also wrote Impromptus published around this time, though Schubert's clearly structured Impromptus largely do not conform to the improvisational traits implied by the literary term "impromptu".

In Schubert's lifetime, only the first two pieces appeared in print, and it remains unclear why the latter two were not published until long after his death. Tobias Haslinger had personally prepared the autograph for printing but the pieces were not published until 1857, in a new edition by his son Carl Haslinger.

== Structure ==
=== No. 1 in C minor ===
No. 1 in C minor

The first Impromptu (Allegro molto moderato), written in C minor, is a distinctive mixture of sonata, variation, and through-composed elements. It starts boldly with dominant octaves serving as the background to a muted funeral march contrasted with an imitative, sensuously Italianate closing theme. It is also the only piece in the set not cast in ternary form. The main theme in C minor is introduced quietly, creating a processional rhythm that's maintained throughout the piece. The evocative narrative is reminiscent of Schubert's song cycles.

The piece commences with two widely spaced G octaves, leaving the key of the piece ambiguous. The piece continues into a march-like melody played first without accompaniment. The melody is repeated with a chordal accompaniment. The march theme is embellished, then leads slowly into the key of A♭ major, where an apparently new melody is introduced. This melody is actually based on the opening melody: the first three notes are spread out more in their intervals but the following three repeated notes remain. Its lyrical quality, accompanied by triplets in the bass, contrasts with the march quality of the opening. An extension of this melody takes the final turn and repeats it several times in different registers. When the main theme returns for the first time, it has combined with the triplet pattern of the previous section. Later, a new pattern with straight (non-triplet) semiquavers is used as accompaniment, modulating to G minor and then an off-beat version asserts itself in quavers. This theme is based on the second theme, and therefore leads into the extension of the second theme again, this time in G major, using the end of the theme's tonic chord as an effective dominant chord transition into the main theme. The theme gradually dies away and leads to C major, resolving the piece's tension into tranquility. This is the longest impromptu in this set.

=== No. 2 in E♭ major ===
No. 2 in E♭ major

Set in E♭ major, the second Impromptu (Allegro) is a swift moto perpetuo with a ternary design, a common structure among the impromptus. It features rapid passagework based on descending scales and arpeggios. The inner section is more declamatory or lyrical episode all'ongarese in B minor.

The piece begins with a lively scale-based and often chromatic melody in triplets; it is in compound ternary form (the A section is in ternary form itself). The middle subsection of the A section is in E♭ minor and is naturally darker than the opening though still very lyrical. The section ends with two oscillating figures which act as an important bridge both here and later. The first subsection repeats but moves quickly into a codetta which reasserts E♭ minor and the darker feeling of the middle subsection. A quick ascending scale leads to the B section in B minor (which however contrasting, is based rhythmically on the implied accents in the structure of the A section (123123123123)). This section is based on a figure alternating a widely spaced bare octave and an offbeat accented triplet. The alternation of octave and triplet becomes closer towards the end and the oscillating figures played at the end of the E♭ minor section return to lead back into the opening A section of the work. The coda is a modified version of the B section, starting in B minor but alternating that key with E♭ minor, in which key the work ends. It is one of few single-movement pieces that begin in a major key and end in the parallel minor (another example being the Rhapsody in E♭ major from Brahms's Four Pieces for Piano, Op. 119).

=== No. 3 in G♭ major ===
No. 3 in G♭ major

The third Impromptu (Andante) is an epitome of slow-moving Schubert melody over a flowing arpeggiated accompaniment. This lyrical and meditative work remains unified in mood and texture throughout.

The work was initially published in G major instead of G♭ major due to concerns over the difficulty for amateur performers. This facilitated reading but not playing, as the original key of G♭ major lies comfortably under the fingers. Schubert's double bars were also divided in 4/2 time, resulting in the loss of natural flow.

The piece is a classic example of Schubert's penchant for long melodic lines. There is little interruption in the fluttering harp-like broken triad accompaniment, creating a tense contrast with the spacious and languid melody—an anticipation of Felix Mendelssohn's Songs Without Words. With no repeats, the melody develops into a shadowy and frequently modulating middle section before returning to its relaxed flow.

The third Impromptu is Schubert's only instrumental movement in the key of G♭ major and is one of the first pieces ever written in it. The unusual choice of key may be related to the ending of the preceding piece.

=== No. 4 in A♭ major ===
No. 4 in A♭ major
All performed by Chiara Bertoglio

The fourth Impromptu (Allegretto), in A♭ major, actually begins in A♭ minor, though this is written as A♭ major with accidentals. The opening theme consists of cascading arpeggios followed by murmuring chordal responses. These are repeated and developed, going through C♭ major and B minor before finally reaching A♭ major. There is a subordinate theme, accompanied by the arpeggio, varied with triplets. In the central section, in C♯ minor, the arpeggios are replaced by a chordal accompaniment. This section ventures into the major mode towards its conclusion, but reverts to the minor. The opening section is repeated and the work ends in A♭ major.

== Legacy ==
The Impromptus have become a staple of the piano repertoire, praised for their lyrical beauty, complex structure, and expressive depth. They are emblematic of Schubert's mature style, characterized by a combination of directness and intimacy of expression, poetic sensitivity, and structural control and grandeur. They also contributed to the evolution of the genre of the short piano piece, influencing later Romantic composers.

Today, the two sets of impromptus, along with his last piano sonatas and the Wanderer Fantasy, form the core of Schubert's piano oeuvre.

== See also ==
- Impromptus (Schubert)
