= Impromptus (Schubert) =

Series of eight piano pieces by Schubert

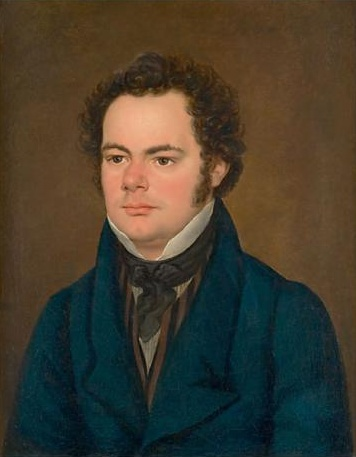
Portrait by Anton Depauly, of Schubert near the end of his life

Franz Schubert's Impromptus are a series of eight pieces for solo piano composed in 1827. They were published in two sets of four impromptus each: the first two pieces in the first set were published in the composer's lifetime as Op. 90; the second set was published posthumously as Op. 142 in 1839 (with a dedication added by the publisher to Franz Liszt). The third and fourth pieces in the first set were published in 1857 (although the third piece was printed by the publisher in G major, instead of G♭ as Schubert had written it, and remained available only in this key for many years). The two sets are now catalogued as D. 899 and D. 935 respectively. They are considered to be among the most important examples of this popular early 19th-century genre.

Three other unnamed piano compositions (D. 946), written in May 1828, six months before the composer's death, are known as both "Impromptus" and Klavierstücke ("piano pieces").

The Impromptus are often considered companion pieces to the Six moments musicaux, and they are often recorded and published together.

It has been said that Schubert was deeply influenced in writing these pieces by the Impromptus, Op. 7 (1822) of Jan Václav Voříšek and by the music of Voříšek's teacher Václav Tomášek.

== Four Impromptus, D. 899 (Op. 90) ==
The first set was composed in 1827, though only the first two were published during Schubert's lifetime.

The first Impromptu in C minor blends elements of sonata, variation, and through-composed structures. The second Impromptu in E♭ major is a swift "moto perpetuo" with a ternary design. The third Impromptu is a flowing and meditative piece in G♭ major, characterized by long melodic lines and unbroken triadic accompaniment. The fourth and final Impromptu, in A♭ major, starts in A♭ minor and is characterized by cascading arpeggios and a chordal response.

== Four Impromptus, D. 935 (Op. posth. 142) ==
The second set was also composed in 1827, but the pieces were not published until 1839.

The first Impromptu in F minor follows the form of a sonata exposition. The second Impromptu in A♭ major is written in the standard minuet form. The third Impromptu in B♭ major is a theme with variations. Finally, the fourth Impromptu in F minor is highly virtuosic and the most technically demanding of the set. Due to their structural and thematic links, some envisioned the four Impromptus as parts of a multi-movement sonata, a conjecture which is subject of debate among musicologists and scholars.

== Drei Klavierstücke, D. 946 ==
The Drei Klavierstücke D. 946, or "Three Piano Pieces", are solo pieces composed by Schubert in May 1828, just six months before his early death. They were conceived as a third set of four Impromptus, but only three were written. They were first published in 1868, edited by Johannes Brahms, although his name appears nowhere in the publication. In comparison with the D. 899 and D. 935 sets, these works are largely neglected and are not often heard in the concert hall or recorded. There is space for doubts, though, as to whether these pieces actually constitute a cycle or they were arbitrarily united by Brahms (the third piece was written on different paper sheets than the first two even though there were empty sheets after the second one). For the same reasons, the dating of the third piece is rather problematic.

Some musicologists refrain from naming these pieces Impromptus though, since whereas the Impromptus D. 899 and D. 935 tend to be closer to sonata-allegro form, the construction of the pieces D. 946 is different and is rather closer to the Moments musicaux, both in how Schubert treats the inner sections of the pieces and how he introduces second themes.

Pianists who have recorded the pieces include Imogen Cooper on Ottavo and Avie; Noël Lee on Disques Valois; András Schiff on Decca; Claudio Arrau, Alfred Brendel, and Mitsuko Uchida on Philips; Wilhelm Kempff, Maria João Pires, Maurizio Pollini, and Grigory Sokolov on Deutsche Grammophon; Steven Osborne on Hyperion; Thomas Larcher on ECM Records; Sviatoslav Richter on Melodiya and BMC Records; Yulianna Avdeeva on Mirare; Michael Endres on Oehms Classics and Eliso Virsaladze on Live Classics. Peter Katin, András Schiff and Jos Van Immerseel have recorded them on period (early-nineteenth-century) instruments.

=== No. 1 in E♭ minor ===
The main section (allegro assai) is in 2/4 time, though, as it is largely in triplets, the effect is like 6/8 for much of the time. It soon moves to E♭ major. As originally written, the piece had two trios, the first in B major, andante in alla breve time, and the second in A♭ major, andantino in 2/4. Schubert crossed out the second, but Brahms included it when editing the first published edition, and it is sometimes played; recordings by Arrau, Pires, Sokolov and Uchida include the second trio.

=== No. 2 in E♭ major ===
This is the most commonly heard of the set and is a highly lyrical piece and very long if all repeats are observed. The first appearance of the main section and both trios are each in two sections, each repeated. The main section is an allegretto in 6/8 time. The first trio is in C minor and major (no change in meter or time signature). The second one is in A♭ minor (l'istesso tempo in alla breve time), with modulations to B minor halfway.

=== No. 3 in C major ===
Impromptu Op. post. D 946 No. 3 in C major (4:58)
Performed by Kimiko Douglass-Ishizaka

By far the shortest of the three, as it only includes one trio instead of two, this is a lively piece (allegro) in 2/4. The main section exhibits a great deal of syncopation. The trio is in two sections with repeats written out in a varied form. It is in D♭ major and 3/2 time with no change in tempo indication. There is a substantial coda, again with syncopation.

== Cultural references ==
Impromptu No. 1 in C minor was featured in Stanley Kubrick's 1975 British–American period drama film Barry Lyndon, which won the Award for Best Musical Score at the 48th Academy Awards for Leonard Rosenman's arrangements of Schubert.

The song Questions on the 1976 album The Roaring Silence by progressive rock group Manfred Mann's Earth Band is based on the main theme of Schubert's Impromptu in G♭ major.

In the 1997 film Gattaca directed by Andrew Niccol, an arrangement of the Impromptu in G♭ major, Op. 90, No. 3 by Michael Nyman is played in a concert by a genetically "enhanced" pianist with twelve fingers. The protagonist, who is genetically defective (has myopia, a fragile body, etc.), and is hiding his condition so as not to be discriminated against, is astonished that someone could be accepted and admired despite being outside the norm and says, "Twelve fingers or one, it's how you play." To his dismay his partner responds, "That piece can only be played with twelve fingers".

Impromptu No. 2 in E♭ major was performed in its entirety by Françoise Rosay in a segment of the 1948 anthology film Quartet starring Dirk Bogarde and Honor Blackman.

Impromptus Nos. 2 (in E♭ major) and 3 (in G♭ major) featured prominently in the 1989 French film Trop Belle Pour Toi, starring Gérard Depardieu.

In the 2002 French film L'homme du train, the old Monsieur Manesquier (played by Jean Rochefort) is more than once depicted playing a part of the Impromptu in A♭ major, Op. 142, No. 2, on his grand piano.

In Howard Jacobson's 2010 Man Booker Prize winning novel The Finkler Question, Impromptu Opus 90 No.3 is referred to as having been played by the character Libor's dead wife Malkie.

Impromptus Nos. 1 and 3, D.899 appeared in Michael Haneke's Palme d'Or winning film Amour. The pieces, played by Alexandre Tharaud, were released in a soundtrack album by EMI Classics.

Impromptus Nos. 3 and 4 from the D.899 set were played in the 1996 film of The Portrait of a Lady, from the novel by Henry James.

The Klavierstück No. 2 in E♭ major, D. 946, was played in the 1985 film The Shooting Party by Edward Fox's character.

The 2015 film The Lady in the Van contains a diegetic performance of Impromptu No. 3 in G♭ major (Op. 90), also appearing on the film's soundtrack.
