= Johann Friedrich Rochlitz =

German playwright, musicologist and art and music critic

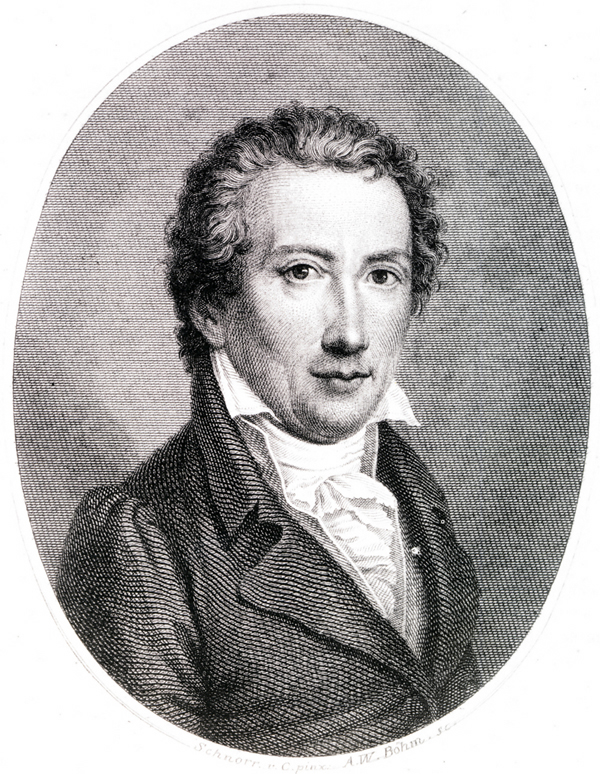
Friedrich Rochlitz, portrait by Veit Hanns Schnorr von Carolsfeld, c. 1820

Johann Friedrich Rochlitz (12 February 1769 – 16 December 1842) was a German playwright, musicologist and art and music critic. His most notable work is his autobiographical account Tage der Gefahr (Days of Danger) about the Battle of Leipzig in 1813 — in Kunst und Altertum, Goethe called it "one of the most wondrous productions ever to have been written". A Friedrich-Rochlitz-Preis for art criticism is named after him — it is awarded by the Leipzig Gesellschaft für Kunst und Kritik and was presented for the fourth time in 2009.

== Life ==
Friedrich Rochlitz was born in Leipzig, where he attended the Thomasschule, and where, from 1789 to 1791, he studied theology, before working as a private tutor. In 1798 he founded the Allgemeine musikalische Zeitung, along with Gottfried Christoph Härtel, serving as its editor until 1818. He planned to marry the harpist Therese Emilie Henriette Winkel and so Duke Karl August made him a privy councillor of the Duchy of Saxe-Weimar on 14 September 1800, but the marriage did not materialise. Instead, on 23 February 1810 he married his childhood sweetheart Henriette Winkler née Hansen (1770–1834) on 23 February 1810. Her previous husband had been the Leipzig businessman Daniel Winkler and she brought Winkler's precious art collection (including a Rembrandt painting) with her on her marriage to Rochlitz.

Rochlitz was a friend of several cultural figures of his era, including Johann Wolfgang von Goethe, Friedrich Schiller, E. T. A. Hoffmann and the composers Louis Spohr and Carl Maria von Weber — Weber dedicated his Piano Sonata No 4 in E minor (J287, Op 70) to Rochlitz. During a stay in Vienna, Rochlitz also got to know Beethoven and Franz Schubert, with the latter setting three poems by Rochlitz to music in 1827. Rochlitz died in Leipzig, aged 73.

== The "Rochlitz anecdotes" ==
As noted above, Rochlitz served for a time as the editor of the Allgemeine musikalische Zeitung (AMZ), a journal published by the music publishing firm Breitkopf & Hartel. Motivated by the wish to publicize the company's edition-in-progress of the composer's works, he published a number of anecdotes about Wolfgang Amadeus Mozart, many of them vivid and entertaining. However, since the research of Maynard Solomon in 1991, Mozart scholars have considered Rochlitz's stories so contaminated by Rochlitz's own fictional additions that they must be considered completely unreliable. It has proven difficult to extirpate Rochlitz's falsehoods and the anecdotes continue to play a role in forming the popular image of the composer.

The anecdotes now form something of a thorn in the side of Mozart scholars. The eminent Mozartist Ruth Halliwell (1998) writes acerbically:

Though it now seems that [the publisher's and Rochlitz's] exercise was a cynical marketing activity, of which biographical truth was the least important consideration, these anecdotes have taken tenacious hold; like weeds, however many times they appear to have been killed, they sprout up somewhere else.

== Works ==
- Charaktere interessanter Menschen, 4 volumes, Züllichau 1799–1803
- Kleine Romane und Erzählungen, 3 volumes, Frankfurt 1807
- Neue Erzählungen, 2 volumes, Leipzig 1816
- Für ruhige Stunden, 2 volumes, Leipzig 1828
- Für Freunde der Tonkunst, 4 volumes, Leipzig 1824–1832; 3rd edition 1868 [a collection of music essays]
- Auswahl des Besten aus Rochlitz' sämtlichen Werken, 6 Bände, Züllichau 1821-1822 [a collection of music essays]
