= List of compositions by Franz Schubert (1826) =

Franz Schubert's compositions of 1826 are mostly in the Deutsch catalogue (D) range D 863–895, and include:

- Instrumental works:
  - String Quartet No. 15, D 887
  - Rondo in B minor for violin and piano, D 895
  - Piano Sonata in G major, D 894
- Vocal music:
  - Deutsche Messe, D 872
  - "Im Frühling", D 882
  - "Ständchen", D 889
  - "An Sylvia", D 891

== Table ==
=== Legend ===
Legend to the table
column		content
1	D '51	Deutsch number in the first version of the Deutsch catalogue (1951)
2	D utd	most recent (utd = up to date) Deutsch catalogue number; the basic collation of the list is according to these numbers – whether or not the possibility to adjust the sorting according to the content of other columns is available depends on the device with which the table is displayed.
3	Op. pbl	Opus number (Op.; p indicates Post. = posthumous) and date of first publication (pbl; between brackets; when there is more than one date the earlier dates indicate partial publications). The column sorts to Opus number, then (earliest of) the publication date(s)
4	AGA	Alte Gesamt-Ausgabe = Franz Schubert's Werke: Kritisch durchgesehene Gesammtausgabe. Indicates genre/instrumentation: Series I: Symphonien (Nos. 1-8) (Johannes Brahms, 1884); Series II: Overtüren und Andere Orchesterwerke (Johann Nepomuk Fuchs, 1886); Series III: Oktette (Nos. 1-3) and IV: Streichquintett (Eusebius Mandyczewski, 1889); Series V: Streichquartette (Nos. 1-15) (Joseph Hellmesberger and Eusebius Mandyczewski, 1890); Series VI: Trio für Streichinstrumente (Eusebius Mandyczewski, 1892); Series VII: Trios, Quartets and Quintets with Piano and VIII: Pianoforte und Ein Instrument (Ignaz Brüll, 1886); Series IX: Pianoforte zu vier Händen (Anton Door, 1888); Series X: Sonaten für Pianoforte (Julius Epstein, 1888); Series XI: Fantasie, Impromptus und andere Stücke für Pianoforte (Julius Epstein, 1888); Series XII: Tänze für Pianoforte (Nos. 1-31) (Julius Epstein, 1889); Series XIII: Messen (Nos. 1-7) (Eusebius Mandyczewski, 1887); Series XIV: Kleinere Kirchenmusikwerke (Nos. 1-22) (Eusebius Mandyczewski, 1888); Series XV: Dramatische Musik (Johann Nepomuk Fuchs, 1893); Series XVI: Werke für Männerchor (Nos. 1-46) (Eusebius Mandyczewski, 1891); Series XVII: Werke für gemischten Chor (Nos. 1-19) (Josef Gänsbacher, Eusebius Mandyczewski, 1892); Series XVIII: Werke für Drei und mehr Frauenstimmen mit Pianoforte-Begleitung (Nos. 1-6) (Josef Gänsbacher, Eusebius Mandyczewski, 1891); Series XIX: Kleine Gesangswerke (Nos. 1-36) (Josef Gänsbacher and Eusebius Mandyczewski, 1892); Series XX: Sämtliche einstimmige Lieder und Gesänge (Eusebius Mandyczewski, 1894-1895); Series XXI: Supplement (Eusebius Mandyczewski, 1897); 1. Instrumentalmusik No. 1-5; 2. Instrumentalmusik No. 6-13; 3. Instrumentalmusik No. 14-; 4. Gesangsmusik; Series XXII: Revisionsbericht
5	NSA	NGA/NSA/NSE = New Schubert Edition, also indicates genre/instrumentation: Series I: Church Music; Series II: Stage Works; Series III: Part Songs; Series IV: Lieder; Series V: Orchestral Works; Series VI: Chamber Music; 1. Octet and Nonet; 2. String Quintet; 3. String Quartets I; 4. String Quartets II; 5. String Quartets III; 6. String Trios; 7. Works for Piano and several instruments; 8. Works for Piano and one instrument; 9. Dances for several instruments; Series VII: Piano Music; 1. Works for Piano Four Hands; 2. Works for Piano Two Hands; Series VIII: Supplement, 2. Schubert's Studies
6	Name	unique name, with, if available, a link to the relevant encyclopedia article; sorts by name with initial definite ("Der", "Die", "Das", ...) or indefinite ("Ein", "A", ...) articles, and numbers, moved after the expression they qualify: e.g. "Die Hoffnung, ..." sorts as "Hoffnung, Die, ..." – "Thirty Minuets ..." sorts as "Minuets, 30, ...".
7	Key / incipit	incipit mostly for songs (linking to lyrics and their translation, for instance at The LiederNet Archive, when available), other compositions by key, except for Schubert's stage works: type of composition in brackets.
8	Date	(presumed) date of composition, or, for copies and arrangements, date of Schubert's autograph. Sorts to earliest possible date of completion, unlike the chronology of the Deutsch catalogue that generally collates according to earliest date associated with the composition: e.g. Schubert started the composition of his 3rd String Quartet on 19 November 1812 and completed it on 21 February 1813 – in the Deutsch catalogue the composition is grouped with other compositions from 1812: when using the sort function of the 8th column the composition is grouped with compositions completed in 1813
9	Additional info	may include: Information about the text (lyrics, libretto) of vocal compositions: e.g., "Text by [text author]", "Text: [standard lyrics]", "... from [literary work]"; "other settings: D ..." indicates Schubert's other settings of the same text; for fields starting with "Text ..." this column sorts by text author (last name, first name—or pen name when such name is more established), then incipit of the lyrics (alternatively, when the incipit is rarely used, title of the work); Information about the authenticity of the composition: the work is without doubt Schubert's unless when marked as "Doubtful", "Spurious?" or "Spurious" (in the last case columns 3–8 give no further information about the composition); Forces needed for performance ("For ..."): may be omitted when the type of composition makes the instrumentation clear (e.g. String Quartet → two violins, viola and cello), and, for vocal music, when the setting is for voice and piano; "s", "a", "t" and "b" refer to a single soprano, alto, tenor and bass singer respectively, while "S", "A", "T" and "B" to choral parts for the same types of singers (see SATB).; Specifications regarding movements (e.g. "Allegro – Minuet – Rondo") or sections (e.g. "No. 1 ..."); Information about the completeness of the extant work: the work is considered complete as extant unless when marked "Sketch", "Incomplete", "Unfinished", "Fragment" or "Lost"; Information about versions (e.g. "Two versions: ...")

=== List ===
Compositions by Franz Schubert listed in the Deutsch catalogue for 1826
D '51	D utd	Op. pbl	AGA	NSA	Name	Key / incipit	Date	Additional info
863	863			IV, 13	An Gott	Kein Auge hat dein Angesicht geschaut	1827 or earlier	Text by Hohlfeld (setting by Rindler publ. 1826); Music lost
864	864			IV, 13	Das Totenhemdchen	Starb das Kindlein	1825 or later	Text by Bauernfeld; Music lost
865	865	105,1 (1828)	XVI; No. 12	III, 3 No. 34; IV, 5	Widerspruch	Wenn ich durch Busch und Zweig	1826?–1828?	Text by Seidl; Two versions: 1st for ttbb and piano
866	866	95 (1828)	XX, 8 Nos. 508– 511	IV, 5	Vier Refrainlieder: 1. Die Unterscheidung – 2. Bei dir allein – 3. Die Männer sind méchant – 4. Irdisches Glück	1. Die Mutter hat mich jüngst gescholten – 2. Bei dir allein empfind ich, daß ich lebe – 3. Du sagtest mir es, Mutter – 4. So mancher sieht mit finstrer Miene	Summer; 1828?	Text by Seidl
867	867	105,2 (1828)	XX, 8 No. 512	IV, 5	Wiegenlied, D 867	Wie sich der Äuglein kindlicher Himmel	1826?–1828?	Text by Seidl
869	869	(1832)	XX, 8 No. 496	IV, 14	Totengräber-Weise	Nicht so düster und so bleich	1826	Text by Schlechta
870	870	80,1 (1827)	XX, 8 No. 506	IV, 4	Der Wanderer an den Mond	Ich auf der Erd', am Himmel du	1826	Text by Seidl
871	871	80,2 (1827) (1979)	XX, 8 No. 507	IV, 4	Das Zügenglöcklein	Kling die Nacht durch, klinge	1826	Text by Seidl; Two versions: 2nd, in AGA, is Op. 80 No. 2
872	872	(1854) (1870)	XIII, 2 No. 7	I, 6	Deutsche Messe mit dem Anhang "Das Gebet des Herrn" (German Mass with The Lord's Prayer appended): 1. Zum Eingang – 2. Zum Gloria – 3. Zum Evangelium und Credo – 4. Zum Offertorium – 5. Zum Sanctus – 6. Nach der Wandlung – 7. Zum Agnus Dei – 8. Schlussgesang – Anh.: Das Gebet des Herrn	1. Wohin soll ich mich wenden – 2. Ehre, Ehre sei Gott in der Höhe! – 3. Noch lag die Schöpfung formlos da – 4. Du gabst, o Herr, mir Sein und Leben – 5. Heilig, heilig, heilig, heilig ist der Herr! – 6. Betrachtend deine Huld und Güte – 7. Mein Heiland, Herr und Meister! – 8. Herr, du hast mein Flehn vernommen – Anh.: Anbetend deine Macht und Größe	summer or early fall 1827	Text by Neumann; Two versions: 1st for SATB and organ – 2nd, in AGA, adds winds, and optional double bass; Ferd. Schubert started publishing his arrangements from before 1838; Vocal score publ. in 1854
873	873	(1974)		III, 4 Anh. II No. 2 VIII, 2 No. 29	Canon, D 873	A major	January; 1826?	For six voices; Sketch
	873A			III, 4 Anh. II No. 3	Nachklänge		January; 1826?	For ttbb; Sketch
874	874			IV, 14	O Quell, was strömst du rasch und wild	O Quell, was strömst du rasch und wild	January; 1826?	Text by Schulze; Sketch
875	875	102 (1831)	XVI; No. 27	III, 3 No. 35	Mondenschein	Des Mondes Zauberblume lacht	January; 1826	Text by Schober; For ttbbb and piano (only voices in AGA, piano score in 1st ed. not original)
	875A			III, 2b Anh. No. 8	Die Allmacht, D 875A	Groß ist Jehova, der Herr!	January; 1826	Text by Pyrker (other setting: D 852); For SATB and piano; Sketch
876	876	(1838)	XX, 8 No. 487	IV, 14	Im Jänner 1817 a.k.a. Tiefes Leid	Ich bin von aller Ruh' geschieden	January; 1826	Text by Schulze
877	877	62 (1827)	XX, 8 Nos. 488– 491	III, 2b No. 23; IV, 3	Gesänge aus Wilhelm Meister (Songs from Wilhelm Meister): 1. Mignon und der Harfner – 2.–4. Lied der Mignon	1.&4. Nur wer die Sehnsucht kennt – 2. Heiß mich nicht reden, heiß mich schweigen – 3. So laßt mich scheinen, bis ich werde	January; 1826	Text by Goethe, from Wilhelm Meister's Apprenticeship (other settings: D 310, 359, 469, 481, 656, 726 and 727); No. 1 for two voices and piano; No. 2 has two versions; No. 4 reuses music of D 403
878	878	105,3 (1828)	XX, 8 No. 492	IV, 5	Am Fenster	Ihr lieben Mauern hold und traut	March 1826	Text by Seidl
879	879	105,4 (1828)	XX, 8 No. 493	IV, 5	Sehnsucht, D 879	Die Scheibe friert, der Wind ist rauh	March 1826	Text by Seidl
880	880	80,3 (1827)	XX, 8 No. 494	IV, 4	Im Freien	Draußen in der weiten Nacht	March 1826	Text by Seidl
881	881	96,4 (1828) (1895)	XX, 8 No. 495	IV, 5	Fischerweise	Den Fischer fechten Sorgen und Gram und Leid nicht an	March 1826	Text by Schlechta; Two versions: 2nd is Op. 96 No. 4
882	882	101p,1 (1828)	XX, 8 No. 497	IV, 5	Im Frühling	Still sitz' ich an des Hügels Hang	March 1826	Text by Schulze
883	883	(1832)	XX, 8 No. 498	IV, 14	Lebensmut, D 883	O wie dringt das junge Leben	March 1826	Text by Schulze
884	884	108,1 (1829)	XX, 8 No. 500	IV, 5	Über Wildemann	Die Winde sausen am Tannenhang	March 1826	Text by Schulze
885	885	66 (1826)	IX, 1 No. 5	VII/1, 4	Grande Marche Héroique	A minor	c. 3/9/1826	For piano duet
887	887	161p (1851)	V No. 15	VI, 5 No. 16	String Quartet No. 15	G major	20– 30/6/1826	Allegro molto moderato – Andante un poco mosso – Scherzo – Allegro assai
888	888	(1850)	XX, 8 No. 502	IV, 14	Trinklied, D 888	Bacchus, feister Fürst des Weins	July 1826	Text by Shakespeare from Antony and Cleopatra II, 7, transl. by Mayerhofer von Grünbühel and Bauernfeld
889	889	(1830)	XX, 8 No. 503	IV, 14	Ständchen, D 889	Horch, horch! die Lerch im Ätherblau	July 1826	Text by Shakespeare from Cymbeline II, 3, transl. by Schlegel, A. W.
890	890	(1830)	XX, 8 No. 504	IV, 14	Hippolits Lied	Laßt mich, ob ich auch still verglüh	July 1826	Text by Gerstenberg
891	891	106,4 (1828)	XX, 8 No. 505	IV, 5	An Sylvia a.k.a. An Silvia a.k.a. Gesang, D 891	Was ist Silvia, saget an	July 1826	Text by Shakespeare from The Two Gentlemen of Verona IV, 2, transl. by Bauernfeld
892	892	134p (1839)	XVI; No. 13	III, 3 No. 36	Nachthelle	Die Nacht ist heiter	September; 1826	Text by Seidl; For tenor solo, ttbb and piano
893	893	(1827)	XVI; No. 41	III, 4 No. 57	Grab und Mond	Silberblauer Mondenschein fällt herab	September; 1826	Text by Seidl; For ttbb
894	894	78 (1827)	X No. 12	VII/2, 3 No. 16	Piano Sonata, D 894 ("Fantasie")	G major	October; 1826	Molto moderato e cantabile – Andante – Minuet – Allegretto
895	895	70 (1827)	VIII; No. 1	VI, 8 No. 7	Rondo, D 895, a.k.a. Rondeau brillant	B minor	October; 1826	For violin and piano

== Sources ==
Multi-volume editions, websites and catalogues

- Alte Gesamt-Ausgabe (AGA) = Franz Schubert's Works: Schubert, Franz (1884–1897). Johannes Brahms; Ignaz Brüll; Anton Door; Julius Epstein; Johann Nepomuk Fuchs; Josef Gänsbacher; Joseph Hellmesberger Sr.; Eusebius Mandyczewski (eds.). Franz Schubert's Werke: Kritisch durchgesehene Gesammtausgabe (in German). Leipzig: Breitkopf & Härtel. Reprints of several volumes by Kalmus and Dover Publications; Franz Schubert's Werke (Series I–XIX and XXI), Series XX, Revisionsbericht: Scores at the International Music Score Library Project
- Deutsch catalogue (D) = Schubert Thematic Catalogue:
  - Deutsch, Otto Erich; et al. (Donald R. Wakeling) (1951). Schubert: Thematic Catalogue of all his Works in Chronological Order (1st ed.). London: Dent. 1995 reprint, with errata correction: Deutsch, Otto Erich; et al. (Donald R. Wakeling) (1995). The Schubert Thematic Catalogue (Dover ed.). Mineola, N.Y.: Dover Publications. ISBN 0486286851.
  - Deutsch, Otto Erich (1978). Walther Dürr; Arnold Feil; Christa Landon [in German]; Werner Aderhold (eds.). Franz Schubert: Thematisches Verzeichnis seiner Werke in chronologischer Folge. New Schubert Edition (in German). Kassel: Bärenreiter. ISBN 9783761805718. ISMN 9790006305148.
    - Series VIII (Supplement)
    - Volume 4
- Hoboken catalogue (Hob.): "Joseph Haydn (1732–1809): Werke sortiert nach Hob (Hoboken-Verzeichnis, 1957-78)" (in German). Kaiserslautern: Klassika.
- Köchel catalogue (K.): "Wolfgang Amadeus Mozart (1756–1791): Werke sortiert nach KV^{6} (Köchel-Verzeichnis, 6. Auflage, 1964)" (in German). Kaiserslautern: Klassika.
- Neue Schubert-Ausgabe (NSA) = New Schubert Edition:
  - NSA scores: Schubert, Franz (1968–2019). International Schubert Association (Tübingen) (ed.). Franz Schubert (1797–1828): New Edition of the Complete Works (in German). Kassel: Bärenreiter. [over 80 volumes in eight series] Individual volumes:
    - NSA II, 15: Schubert, Franz; Neumann, Johann Philipp (2008). Jahrmärker, Manuela; Aigner, Thomas (eds.). Sacontala. New Schubert Edition (in German). Kassel: Bärenreiter. ISMN 9790006497294.
      - Series II (Stage Works), Vol. 15
    - NSA VIII, 4: See above Deutsch (1978)
  - NSA website: "New Schubert Edition". Tübingen: International Schubert Association.
- Schubert Online: "www.schubert-online.at: Schubert music manuscripts, first and early editions online". Vienna: Austrian Academy of Sciences (ÖAW).
- The LiederNet Archive: Ezust, Emily; et al. (LiederNet contributors). "Composer: Franz Peter Schubert (1797 - 1828)". Ontario: LiederNet Corporation.

Other

- Badura-Skoda, Eva; Branscombe, Peter, eds. (2008). Schubert Studies: Problems of Style and Chronology. Cambridge University Press. ISBN 0521088720.
  - Walther Dürr "Schubert's Songs and Their Poetry" pp. 1–24
  - Rufus Hallmark "Schubert's 'Auf dem Strom'" pp. 25–46
  - Elaine Brody "Schubert and Sulzer Revisited" pp. 47–60
  - Marius Flothuis "Schubert Revises Schubert" pp. 61–84
  - Elizabeth Norman McKay "Schubert as Composer of Operas" pp. 85–104
  - Peter Branscombe "Schubert and the Melodrama" pp. 105–142
  - Christoph Wolff "Schubert's 'Der Tod und dad Mädchen'" pp. 143–172
  - Peter Gülke on String Quintet D 956 pp. 173–186
  - Paul Badura-Skoda on Schubert's 'Great' C major Symphony pp. 187–208
  - Robert Winter "Paper Studies and the Future of Schubert Research" pp. 209–276
  - Eva Badura-Skoda "The Chronology of Schubert's Piano Trios" pp. 277–296
  - Reinhard Van Hoorickx "The Chronology of Schubert's Fragments and Sketches" pp. 297–326
  - Arnold Feil "Rhythm in Schubert" pp. 327–346
  - Alexander Weinmann on Leopold Puschl and Schubert's sojourn in Zseliz pp. 347–356
- Elsholz, Gunter (1982). Vogel, Reimut (ed.). Franz Schubert: Sinfonie in E-Dur 1825. Stuttgart: Goldoni. ISBN 3922044050. OCLC 987719669.
- Hilmar, Ernst; Jestremski, Margret, eds. (2004). Schubert-Enzyklopädie (in German). Vol. 1. Introduction by Alfred Brendel. Tutzing: Hans Schneider. ISBN 3795211557.
- Keefe, Simon P., ed. (2006). Mozart Studies. Cambridge University Press. ISBN 0521851025.
- Kube, Michael (2009). "Franz Schuberts Deutsche Trauermesse (D 621) als Problem der Text- und Stilkritik". In Mitterauer, Gertraud; Müller, Ulrich; Springeth, Margarete; Vitzthum, Verena (eds.). Was ist Textkritik?: Zur Geschichte und Relevanz eines Zentralbegriffs der Editionswissenschaft (in German). Walter de Gruyter. pp. 129–140. ISBN 3484970782.
- Mozart, Wolfgang Amadeus; Haydn, Joseph; Haydn, Michael (2008). Kircher, Armin (ed.). Chorbuch Mozart • Haydn VII: Kanonsammlung [Choral Collection Mozart • Haydn, Vol. VII: Canon Collection] (in German, Latin, English, and Italian). Stuttgart: Carus-Verlag. OCLC 274222567.
- Newbould, Brian (1999). Schubert: The Music and the Man. University of California Press. ISBN 0520219570.
- Reed, John (1997). The Schubert Song Companion. Manchester University Press. ISBN 1901341003.
- Van Hoorickx, Reinhard (1971). "Franz Schubert (1797–1828) List of the Dances in Chronological Order". Revue belge de Musicologie / Belgisch Tijdschrift voor Muziekwetenschap. 25 (1). Belgian Musicological Society: 68–97. doi:10.2307/3686180. ISSN 0771-6788. JSTOR 3686180.
- Van Hoorickx, Reinhard (1974–1976). "Thematic Catalogue of Schubert's Works: New Additions, Corrections and Notes". Revue belge de Musicologie / Belgisch Tijdschrift voor Muziekwetenschap. 28–30. Belgian Musicological Society: 136–171. doi:10.2307/3686053. ISSN 0771-6788. JSTOR 3686053.
