= Schubert's last sonatas =

Final three piano sonatas by Franz Schubert (1828)

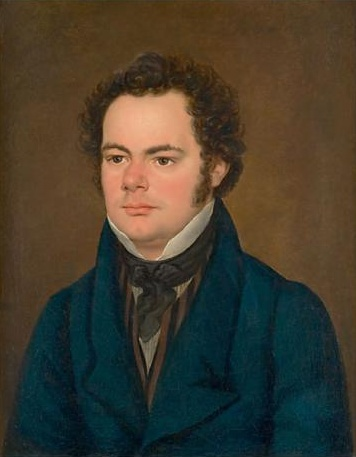
Portrait by Anton Depauly, of Schubert at the end of his life

Franz Schubert's last three piano sonatas, D. 958–960, are his last major compositions for solo piano. They were written during the last months of his life, between the spring and autumn of 1828, but were not published until about ten years after his death, in 1838–39. Like the rest of Schubert's piano sonatas, they were mostly neglected in the 19th century. By the late 20th century, however, public and critical opinion had changed, and these sonatas are now considered among the most important of the composer's mature masterpieces. They are part of the core piano repertoire, appearing regularly on concert programs and recordings.

One of the reasons for the long period of neglect of Schubert's piano sonatas seems to be their dismissal as structurally and dramatically inferior to the sonatas of his contemporary Beethoven. In fact, the last sonatas contain distinct allusions and similarities to works by Beethoven, a composer Schubert venerated. Nevertheless, musicological analysis has shown that these sonatas maintain a mature, individual style which they are praised for, manifested in unique features such as a cyclical formal and tonal design, chamber music textures, and a rare depth of emotional expression.

Each one of the three sonatas is cyclically intraconnected by diverse structural, harmonic and melodic elements tying together all movements, as well as interconnecting all three sonatas together. Consequently, they are often regarded as a trilogy. They also contain specific allusions and similarities to other Schubert compositions, such as his Winterreise song cycle; these connections point to turbulent emotions expressed in the sonatas, often understood as highly personal and autobiographical. Indeed, some researchers have suggested specific psychological narratives for the sonatas, based on historical evidence concerning the composer's life.

== Historical background ==
The last year of Schubert's life was marked by growing public acclaim for the composer's works, but also by the gradual deterioration of his health. On March 26, 1828, together with other musicians in Vienna, Schubert gave a public concert of his own works, which was a great success and earned him a considerable profit. In addition, two new German publishers took an interest in his works, leading to a short period of financial well-being. However, by the time the summer months arrived, Schubert was again short of money and had to cancel some journeys he had previously planned.

Schubert had been struggling with syphilis since 1822–23, and suffered from weakness, headaches and dizziness. However, he seems to have led a relatively normal life until September 1828, when new symptoms such as effusions of blood appeared. At this stage he moved from the Vienna home of his friend Franz von Schober to his brother Ferdinand's house in the suburbs, following the advice of his doctor; unfortunately, this may have actually worsened his condition. However, up until the last weeks of his life in November 1828, he continued to compose an extraordinary amount of music, including the three last sonatas.

Schubert probably began sketching the sonatas sometime around the spring months of 1828; the final versions were written in September. These months also saw the appearance of the Three Piano Pieces, D. 946, the Mass in E♭ major, D. 950, the String Quintet, D. 956, and the songs published posthumously as the Schwanengesang collection (D. 957 and D. 965A), among others. The final sonata was completed on September 26, and two days later, Schubert played from the sonata trilogy at an evening gathering in Vienna. In a letter to Probst (one of his publishers), dated October 2, 1828, Schubert mentioned the sonatas amongst other works he had recently completed and wished to publish. However, Probst was not interested in the sonatas, and by November 19, Schubert was dead.

In the following year, Schubert's brother Ferdinand sold the sonatas' autographs to another publisher, Anton Diabelli, who would only publish them about ten years later, in 1838 or 1839. Schubert had intended the sonatas to be dedicated to Johann Nepomuk Hummel, whom he greatly admired. Hummel was a leading pianist, a pupil of Mozart, and a pioneering composer of the Romantic style (like Schubert himself). However, by the time the sonatas were published in 1839, Hummel was dead, and Diabelli, the new publisher, decided to dedicate them instead to composer Robert Schumann, who had praised many of Schubert's works in his critical writings.

== Structure ==
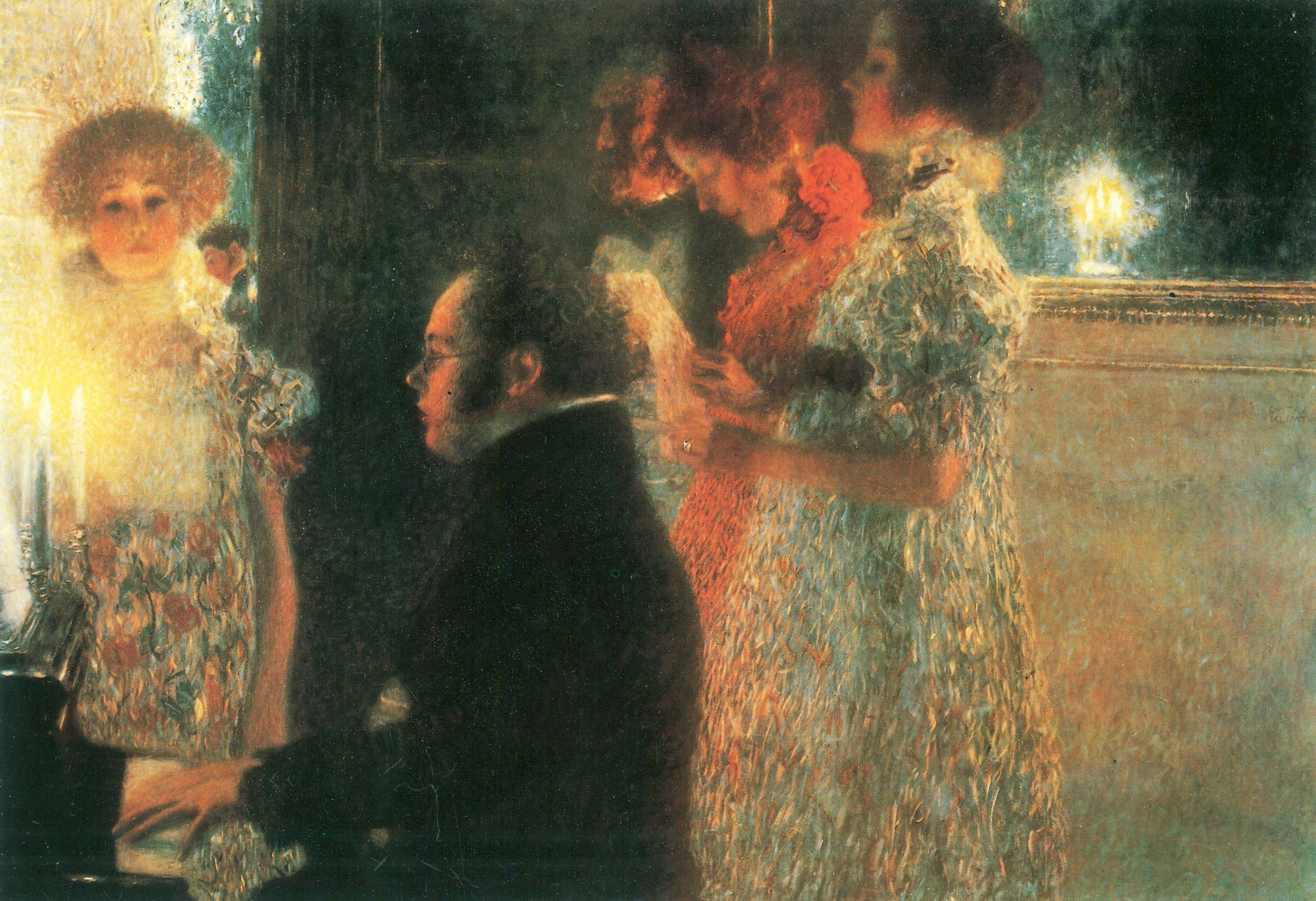
Schubert at the Piano by Gustav Klimt

Schubert's three last sonatas have many structural features in common. D. 958 can be considered the odd one of the group, with several differences from the remarkably similar structure of D. 959 and D. 960. First, it is in a minor key, and this is the primary departure that determines its other differences from its companions. Accordingly, the major/minor scheme is alternated, with main material being minor, and digressions and the slow movement set in the major. Its opening Allegro is considerably more concise than those of the other two sonatas and does not make use of the expansive time-dilating modulatory quasi-development passages that so strongly characterize the other two opening movements. Furthermore, its slow movement follows an ABABA form instead of the ABA form of the other two sonatas. Its third movement, instead of a scherzo, is a slightly less lively, more subdued minuet. Finally, the finale is in a sonata form rather than rondo-sonata form.

However, these differences are relative and are significant only in comparison to the extreme similarity of D. 959 and D. 960. Those two are similar to the extent that they can be considered variations on an identical compositional template, having no major structural differences.

All three sonatas, most importantly, share a common dramatic arc and make considerable and identical use of cyclic motives and tonal relationships to weave musical-narrative ideas through the work. Each sonata consists of four movements, in the following order:

1. The first movement is in moderate or fast tempo and in sonata form. The exposition consists of two or three thematic and tonal areas and, as common in the Classical style, moves from tonic to dominant (in major-mode works) or to the relative major (in minor mode works). However, as often with Schubert, the harmonic scheme of the exposition involves additional, intermediate tonalities, which may be quite remote from the tonic-dominant axis and sometimes imbue certain expository passages with the character of a development section. The main themes of the exposition are often in ternary form, with their middle section digressing to a different tonality. The themes generally do not form symmetrical periods, and irregular phrase lengths are prominent. The exposition ends with a repeat sign.
  The development section opens with an abrupt turn into a new tonal area. A new theme, based on a melodic fragment from the second thematic group of the exposition, is presented in this section over recurrent rhythmic figuration, and then developed, undergoing successive transformations. The first thematic group returns in the recapitulation with different or additional harmonic digressions; the second group returns unaltered, only transposed a fourth up. The short coda maintains the tonic key and mainly soft dynamics, achieving a resolution of the movement's conflicts and ending pianissimo.
2. The second movement is slow, in a key different from the tonic, and in ABA (ternary) or ABABA form. The main sections (A and B) are contrasted in key and character, A is slow and meditative; B is more intense and animated. The movement begins and ends slowly and quietly.
3. The third movement is a dance (a scherzo or minuet) in the tonic, in overall ABA ternary form, with a trio in either ternary or binary form, and in a conventionally related key (relative major, subdominant, and parallel minor respectively). They are based on their sonata's first movements, with a similar tonal scheme and/or motivic reference. The B section of each piece features tonalities serving important dramatic functions in previous movements. Each features animated, playful figurations for the right hand and abrupt changes in register.
4. The finale is in moderate or fast tempo and in sonata or rondo-sonata form. The themes of the finales are characterized by long passages of melody accompanied by relentless flowing rhythms. The exposition has no repeat written in. The development section is more ordinary in style than that of the first movement, with frequent modulations, sequences, and fragmentation of the exposition's first theme (or the main theme of the rondo).
  The recapitulation closely resembles the exposition, with the minimal harmonic changes needed to end the section in the tonic: the first theme returns in a shortened version; the second theme returns unaltered, only transposed a fourth up. The coda is based on the exposition's first theme. It is composed of two parts, the first quiet and attenuated, creating a sense of expectation, the second animated, dissipating the final tension in decisive, agitated motion and ending with fortissimo tonic chords and octaves.

== The sonatas ==
=== Sonata in C minor, D. 958 ===
Piano Sonata in C minor
- by Franz Schubert
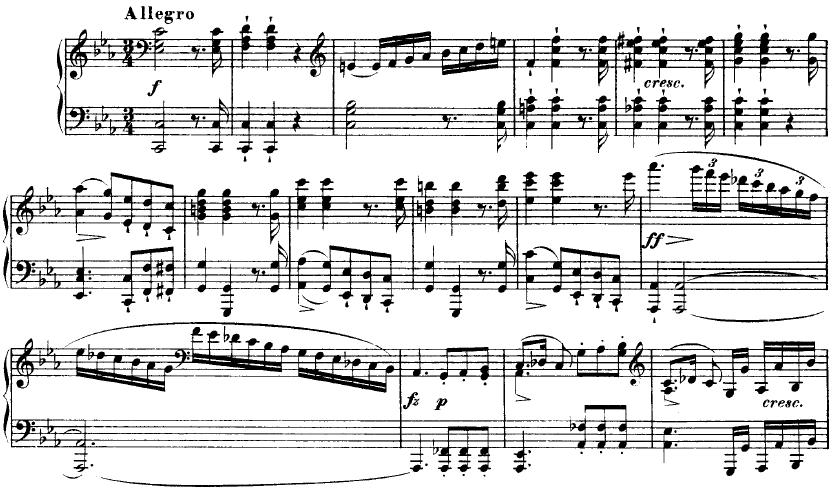
- Opening of the first movement
- Catalogue: D. 958
- Composed: 1828, Vienna
- Published: 1839
- Duration: c. 30 minutes
- Movements: 4
- Scoring: Solo piano

==== I. Allegro ====
The opening is dramatic, with a fully voiced, forte C-minor chord. The voice leading of this passage outlines a chromatic ascent to A♭ – this will be the first instance of a remarkable degree of chromaticism in the sonata as a whole. The most salient feature of the first theme is the sudden modulatory digression to A♭ major, established by a rushing downward scale initiated by the final achievement of this key in the ascending voice of the minor theme. The exposition shifts from the tonic to the relative major (E♭ major), touching midway upon its parallel minor (E♭ minor), all in accordance with Classical practice. This second theme, a hymn-like E♭ major melody in four-part harmony, greatly contrasts with the first, though its melodic contour is prefigured in the sudden A♭ major departure. Both themes progress somewhat in the style of variations and are structured with irregular phrase lengths.

The development section is highly chromatic and is texturally and melodically distinct from the exposition. The recapitulation is once again traditional, staying in the tonic and stressing subdominant tonalities (D♭, the lowered second degree – in the first theme). The coda returns to the material of the development section but with stable tonality, dying out in a dark series of cadences in low register.

==== II. Adagio ====
The second movement is in A♭ major, ABABA form. Nostalgic in its traditional Classical character (one of the few instrumental Adagios Schubert wrote), the opening theme of this movement is an elegant, touching melody that eventually undergoes remarkable tonal and cadential treatment, undermining the peaceful setting. Charles Fisk has pointed out that the voice leading of the first phrase, 1–7–1–2–3–4–3, is based on the initial A♭ digression in the beginning of the Allegro. The unorthodox, chromatic harmonic structure of this movement is generated from a short progression that appears towards the end of the A section, leading to a plagal cadence in the subdominant key (D♭), chromatically colored with its own minor subdominant chord (G♭ minor). The importance of this progression and of D♭ in general is emphasized by its quotation in a climax of the finale's exposition. This diversion of the main theme's expected cadence leads to the haunted atmosphere of the B section, which is full of chromatic modulations and startling sforzandos.

In the second appearance of the A and B sections, almost the entire music is shifted a semitone up, further cementing the importance of the ascending minor second in the sonata as a whole. The focal plagal progression returns transformed at the end of the movement, with even subtler chromatic coloration and more distant modulations, touching on C major, before the piece finally ends in the tonic, the theme now weakened and given an illusory quality due to the evasion of cadences, free modulation, and tendency toward digression into troubled minor passages.

==== III. Menuetto: Allegro – Trio ====
The third movement is somber, quite distinct from the typical atmosphere of dance movements. It is relatively conservative in its key scheme, moving to the relative major key and back to the tonic. In the B section, a sequence of hemiolas is interrupted by a dramatic interpolation in A♭ major, referencing the departure to this key in the opening of the Allegro with the added minor sixth. The second A section is a transformation of the first, interrupted every four bars by a silent bar, creating a mysterious atmosphere. The trio is in A♭ major, ternary form, with a B section beginning in E♭ major colored by its own minor sixth and modulating to G♭ major via the parallel minor.

==== IV. Allegro ====
This movement is written in 6/8 and in tarantella style and is characterised by a relentless galloping rhythm calling on demanding pianistic effects with frequent hand-crossing and leaps across registers. It employs the three-key exposition, a recurrent element in Schubert's style. The first theme shifts from C minor to C major – another Schubertian feature, and contains many allusions to D♭ major, which finally becomes established in a climactic reference to the Adagio's characteristic plagal cadence. The second theme, proceeding with the enharmonic parallel minor of this cadence (C♯ minor), further develops the cadence in its alternation of tonic and subdominant tonalities. After a series of modulations, the exposition ends in the traditional relative major, E♭.

The development section begins in B major with a new theme, derived from the last bars of the exposition. Later on, additional material from the exposition is developed, gradually building up towards a climax. The recapitulation is also written in three keys; the first theme is drastically shortened, and this time the second theme veers to B♭ minor, the result being that the closing section appears in the traditional tonic.

The coda begins with a long anticipatory passage which stresses A♭, the submediant, and then reintroduces the first theme, restoring most of the music omitted from its reprise. This last passage is characterized by sweeping arpeggios with violent dynamic contrasts – a series of subito fortissimo decaying to piano, following the rise and fall of the melody. On the last iteration, the melody hits triple forte at the zenith of its register and then plunges four octaves in a descending arpeggio, marked poco a poco diminuendo al pianissimo. An emphatic cadence then concludes the piece.

=== Sonata in A major, D. 959 ===
Piano Sonata in A major
- by Franz Schubert
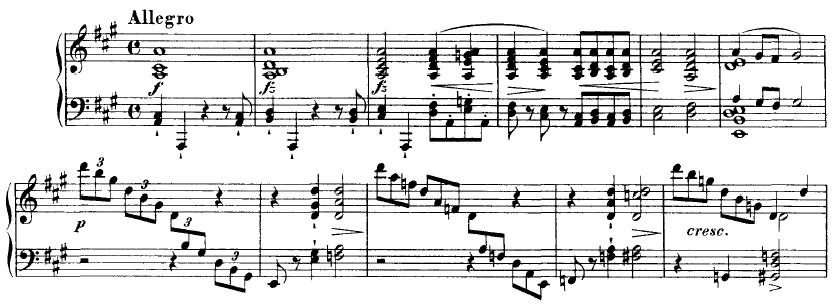
- Opening of the first movement
- Catalogue: D. 959
- Composed: 1828, Vienna
- Published: 1839
- Duration: c. 40 minutes
- Movements: 4
- Scoring: Solo piano

==== I. Allegro ====
I. Allegro

The sonata begins with a forte, heavily textured chordal fanfare emphasizing a low A pedal and duple-meter stepwise diatonic ascent in thirds in the middle voices, followed immediately by quiet descending triplet arpeggios punctuated by light chords outlining a chromatic ascent. These highly contrasting phrases provide the motivic material for much of the sonata. The second theme is a lyrical melody written in four-part harmony. The exposition follows standard classical practice by modulating from tonic (A) to dominant (E) for the second theme, even preparing the latter tonality with its own V – the only first movement to do so in the mature Schubert. Despite this traditional approach, both exposition themes are built in an innovative ternary form, and in each resulting 'B' section a highly chromatic development-like section based on the exposition's second phrase modulates through the circle of fourths, only to return to the tonic. This novel structure creates a sense of harmonic movement without actually committing to a thematic modulation, and is one of the techniques Schubert uses to achieve a sense of scale in the movement.

The development proper is based on a scalar variation of the second theme heard at the end of the exposition. Here, in contrast to the striking modulatory excursions nested in the exposition, the tonal plan is static, shifting constantly between C major and B major (later B minor). After the development theme is finally stated in the tonic minor, the dramatic retransition has the unconventional role of only shifting to the major mode to prepare the recapitulation, rather than fully preparing the tonic key (which in this case has already been established).

The recapitulation is traditional – staying in the tonic, and emphasizing the tonic minor and the flat submediant (F major) as subdominant tonalities. The coda restates the first theme, this time in a much more 'hesitant' manner, pianissimo and with further allusions to subdominant tonalities. The movement ends with serene arpeggios; however, for the penultimate chord, Schubert chose a striking Italian sixth on ♭II, instead of the more usual dominant or diminished seventh chords. This choice is not arbitrary – it is a final statement of the chromatically based ascending minor second motive that pervaded the movement, a motive that will be reversed into a descending minor second in the following movement.

==== II. Andantino ====
II. Andantino

The second movement is in F♯ minor, in ABA form. The A section presents a sparse, lamenting, poignant melody, full of sighing gestures (portrayed by descending seconds). This theme, despite its vastly different character, references the opening bars of the Allegro, an aforementioned source of much of the sonata's material – the Andantino's first measure shares with the fanfare a second-beat bass note 'echo' after the downbeat on A, creating an audible rhythmic affinity; additionally, the quiet close of the A theme features the fanfare's characteristic pattern of stepwise thirds in the middle voices enclosed between tonic octaves.

The middle section is of an improvisatory, fantasia-like character, with extremely harsh modulations and sonorities, culminating in C♯ minor with fortissimo chords. The chromaticism, triplet emphasis, and modulatory patterns of this section are all reminiscent of the developments nested within the Allegro's exposition. After the C♯ minor climax (according to Fisk, a key of great importance in the cycle due to its relation to "Der Wanderer"), a recitative section with startling sforzando outbursts emphasizing an ascending minor second leads to a serene phrase in the major mode (C♯ major), which in turn leads (as the dominant of F♯ minor) back to the A section, here somewhat transformed, with new accompanimental figuration. The final bars of the movement feature rolled chords that prefigure the opening of the following Scherzo.

==== III. Scherzo: Allegro vivace – Trio: Un poco più lento ====
III. Scherzo: Allegro vivace – Trio: Un poco più lento

The A section of the scherzo uses a playful leaping rolled chord figure that is rhythmically and harmonically reminiscent of the opening bars of the sonata. The B section is dominated by the juxtaposition of two distant tonal realms. It commences in C major for a rollicking theme that is abruptly interrupted by a downward-rushing C♯ minor scale without any modulatory preparation, in a striking cyclic reference to the climax of the preceding movement's middle section. Following this outburst, the B section quietly ends in C♯ minor a grace-note melody identical in contour to a figure from the theme of the Andantino (2–1–7–1–3–1), before modulating back to the movement's tonic. C major returns in the concluding A section, this time more tonally integrated into its A-major surroundings, by modulatory sequences. The ternary form trio in D major uses hand crossing to add melodic accompaniment to the chordal theme, and is rhythmically and harmonically based on the opening of the Allegro.

==== IV. Rondo: Allegretto – Presto ====
IV. Rondo: Allegretto – Presto
All performed by Paul Pitman

This lyrical rondo movement consists of flowing triplet movement and endless songful melody. Its form is a sonata-rondo (A–B–A–development–A–B–A–coda). The rondo's main and opening theme is taken from the slow movement of the sonata D. 537 of 1817. Charles Fisk has pointed out that this theme would make musical sense as a response subsequent to the questioning leading tone that closes the Allegro's opening fanfare; in this capacity the Rondo's lyricism is the dramatically delayed final goal of the sonata. The second thematic group is written in the traditional dominant key; however, it is very long, modulating through many different subdominant tonalities.

The development section, in contrast, culminates in a long passage in C♯ minor with a climax characterized by a tension-building ambiguity between E major and C♯ minor and a greatly prolonged evasion of a cadence. This leads to a false recapitulation in F♯ major, which then modulates to begin again in the home key.

In the coda, the main theme returns fragmented, with full bar pauses, which lead each time to unexpected changes of key. This is followed by an agitated Presto section, based on the final bars of the main theme, and the sonata concludes with a bold evocation of its very opening measures, with an ascending arpeggio (essentially an inversion of the descending figure from the Allegro's second phrase), followed by a fortissimo full statement of the opening fanfare in retrograde.

=== Sonata in B♭ major, D. 960 ===
Piano Sonata in B♭ major
- by Franz Schubert
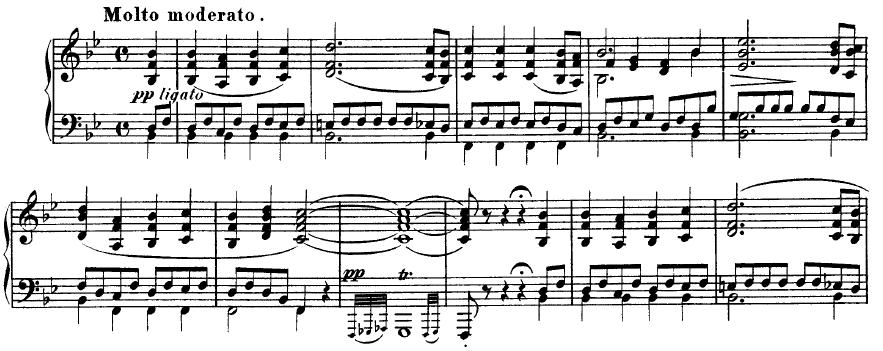
- Opening of the first movement
- Catalogue: D. 960
- Composed: 1828, Vienna
- Published: 1839
- Duration: c. 45 minutes
- Movements: 4
- Scoring: Solo piano

==== I. Molto moderato ====
I. Molto moderato

This movement employs a three-key exposition. The first theme introduces a G♭ trill that anticipates the following harmonic events – a shift to G♭ major in the central section of the main theme, and, after a return to the tonic, an enharmonic shift to F♯ minor at the start of the second theme. After a colorful harmonic excursion, the third tonal area arrives in the traditional dominant key (F major).

In contrast to the previous sonatas, here the development section elaborates on several different themes from the exposition. It reaches a dramatic climax in D minor, in which the first theme is presented, fluctuating between D minor and the home key, in a manner similar to the parallel passage from the previous sonata (see above). In the recapitulation, the bass line in the first theme rises to B♭ instead of descending to F (as in the exposition), and the second theme enters in B minor, instead of F♯ minor. The rest of the exposition is repeated without alterations, transposed a fourth up, meaning that it returns to the home key, B♭, for the third tonal area. The coda once again recalls the first theme, although only fragmentarily.

During the development of this movement, starting at bar 151 in D♭, Schubert quotes the opening motif of the piano part of his own lied composition "Der Wanderer" (D. 489).

==== II. Andante sostenuto ====
II. Andante sostenuto

This movement is written in ternary form, and is in the key of C♯ minor – "the most tonally remote inner movement in Schubert's mature instrumental works in sonata form". In the main section, a somber melody is presented over a relentless rocking rhythm in a texture swimming in pedal. The central section is written in A major and presents a choral melody over an animated accompaniment; it later touches upon B♭ major, the sonata's home key. The main section returns with a variant of the original accompanying rhythm. This time, the tonal scheme is more unusual: after a half cadence on the dominant, a sudden, mysterious harmonic shift introduces the remote key of C major. This eventually turns into E major, and proceeds as before. The coda shifts to the tonic major but is still haunted by glimpses of the minor mode.

==== III. Scherzo: Allegro vivace con delicatezza – Trio ====
III. Scherzo: Allegro vivace con delicatezza – Trio

The first part of the scherzo proper cadences not in the tonic or dominant but in the subdominant. The second, B part, continues to modulate by ascending fourths, until it reaches the key of D♭ major. In this key, a new theme is presented, emphasizing the local subdominant (G♭ major, a further fourth upward) – first in the major mode, then in the minor, with an enharmonic shift to F♯ minor. This harmonic excursion eventually leads, through A major and a B diminished triad, back to the tonic and the opening section. The trio is in binary form and in B♭ minor, the first presentation of the tonic minor in the sonata.

==== IV. Allegro ma non troppo – Presto ====
IV. Allegro ma non troppo – Presto
All performed by Bernd Krueger

The finale has the same structure as that of the previous sonata. Many elements of this movement imply large-scale resolution of harmonic and thematic conflicts established earlier in this and even the two previous sonatas. The main rondo theme opens with an 'empty' octave on G, which resolves to C minor, subsequently interpreted as ii in B♭ major. Alfred Brendel asserts that this theme, beginning in the ambiguous G/Cm, functions as a resolution of the troubling G♭ trill presented in the very beginning of the sonata, using G♭ to resolve to F major as dominant of B♭. The second theme, in ternary form, is written in the traditional key of the dominant, with a central section in D major; it consists of an extended, characteristically Schubertian stepwise melody played over an uninterrupted flow of semiquavers. This second theme uses the same melodic contour (5–8–7–6–6–5–(5–4–4–3)) of the remarkable C-major modulation in the final A section of the second movement, implying further connotations of conflict resolution.

After an abrupt end to the second theme and a pregnant pause, a minor dotted-rhythm chordal theme in F-minor suddenly enters fortissimo, elaborating and modulating before sublimating into a pianissimo version of itself in the parallel major. This third theme is highly similar in rhythm and melodic contour as well as left-hand pattern to the tarantella of the C minor sonata, which may not be a coincidence when considering the overall high level of cyclic connection between the sonatas. This theme evolves into a rhythmic segue that leads seamlessly back to the main theme of the rondo.

The development section, based entirely on the rhythmic pattern of the main rondo theme, is characterised by juxtaposed eighth notes and triplets, reaching a climax on C♭ major, from which the bass descends in chromatic modulation eventually to G in an extended diminuendo to return to the main theme.

In the coda, the main theme is fragmented in a manner also similar to the finale of the previous sonata; in a highly chromatic and unstable progression, the octave on G here descends through G♭ to F, in an extension of the G-G♭-F resolution of the theme. After finally reaching this dominant preparation for the final time, the movement closes with an exceedingly triumphant and affirming presto section that totally resolves all dramatic conflicts in the sonata and the series.

== Compositional process ==
The compositional process of the last sonatas can be studied owing to the almost complete survival of their manuscripts. According to these, the sonatas were written in two stages – a preliminary sketch (the first draft) and a full, mature final version (the fair copy).

The sketches were written during the spring and summer of 1828, possibly even earlier. The inner movements were sketched up to the final bar, while the outer, sonata-form movements were only sketched up to the beginning of the recapitulation and in the coda. In the sketches, passages from different movements (or even different sonatas) sometimes appear on the same leaf; such evidence suggests that the last two sonatas were composed in parallel, at least in part. Furthermore, in the B♭ Sonata, Schubert sketched the finale before completing the first movement, unlike his usual practice, in which finales were conceived at a later stage.

The final versions of the sonatas convey the impression of a single unit and were likely notated in close succession during September 1828. The sonatas were labeled Sonate I, II, III, respectively, and Schubert wrote at the bottom of the last folio of the third sonata the date September 26. As compared to the sketches, the final versions are written much more neatly and orderly, with full notation and greater care for small details.

A thorough study of the emendations that Schubert edited into the final versions, in comparison with his sketches, reveals many insights. "Examination of Schubert's sketches for the sonatas reveals him as highly self-critical; moreover, it shows that the 'heavenly lengths' of the sonatas were actually a later addition, not conceived from the start. In his subsequent corrections, Schubert elaborated on his themes and expanded them, giving them more 'musical space'", in Alfred Brendel's words. In the revision, Brendel continues, "proportions are rectified, details start to tell, fermatas suspend time. Rests clarify the structure, allowing breathing space, holding the breath or listening into silence".

The major emendations in the final versions can be summarized as follows:

1. The most frequent modification is expansion of the original material. The expansions frequently repeat preceding measures or consist of rests or left-hand figurations without the melody, providing a pause in the motion. This is especially noticeable in the Adagio, minuet and finale of the C minor Sonata, the middle section of the Andantino in the A major Sonata, and the first movement of the B♭ Sonata.
2. Changes in the tempo or meter indications, mainly in the opening movements: D.958/I was originally marked Allegro moderato; D.959/I was originally in alla breve time; D.959/II was originally marked Andante; and D.960/I was originally marked Moderato.
3. Some of the major cyclic elements in the sonatas were only added in the final version. This includes the final bars of the A major Sonata, which consist of a cancrizans of its opening; and the arpeggiation at the end of the slow movement of the same work, which anticipates the opening of the scherzo.
4. Classical-type sonata-form transitions, going from tonic to dominant, were also modified. In the opening movement of the A major Sonata, the transition was originally written a fourth higher; as it appears, only after figuring out the recapitulation, did Schubert decide to transpose the transition in the exposition in accordance with the recapitulation's harmonic scheme, thus creating the more Classical type transition that establishes V of V, found in no other opening movement in late Schubert. In the analogous place in the finale of the same sonata, Schubert started writing the transition but eventually discarded it and started again, once he realized he was still in the tonic, rather than establishing the dominant. These examples demonstrate the weakening of the tonic-dominant axis in Schubert's harmonic thinking and his general "aversion to the dominant".
5. Two passages in the sonatas were radically modified: the development section in the finale of the A major Sonata, and the middle section in the slow movement of the B♭ Sonata.

In addition to the differences mentioned above, numerous other, local modifications of the structure, harmony or texture were applied to the original material. In these modifications, certain uniquely 'daring' original progressions were occasionally toned down, whereas in other places, the new version was even bolder than its predecessor.

== Unifying elements and cyclicism ==
Schubert composed his three last sonatas in close succession. He intended to publish them together as a set, as evident by the sonatas' titles. In support of this view that the sonatas are a single unity, pianist and scholar Alfred Brendel has found profound musical links between the sonatas. He has argued that the sonatas complement each other in their contrasting characters and demonstrated that the entire sonata trilogy is based on the same basic group of intervallic motifs. Moreover, each of the sonatas contains a complex network of inner harmonic and motivic connections linking together all movements, and passages from one movement often reappear, usually transformed, in later movements. Most of these connections are too subtle to be detected during casual listening. In some cases, however, Schubert quotes a theme or passage from an earlier movement with little alteration, inserting it in structurally significant locations, creating an immediately audible allusion. Such explicit connections are related to the cyclic form, one of the musical forms associated with the Romantic period in music.

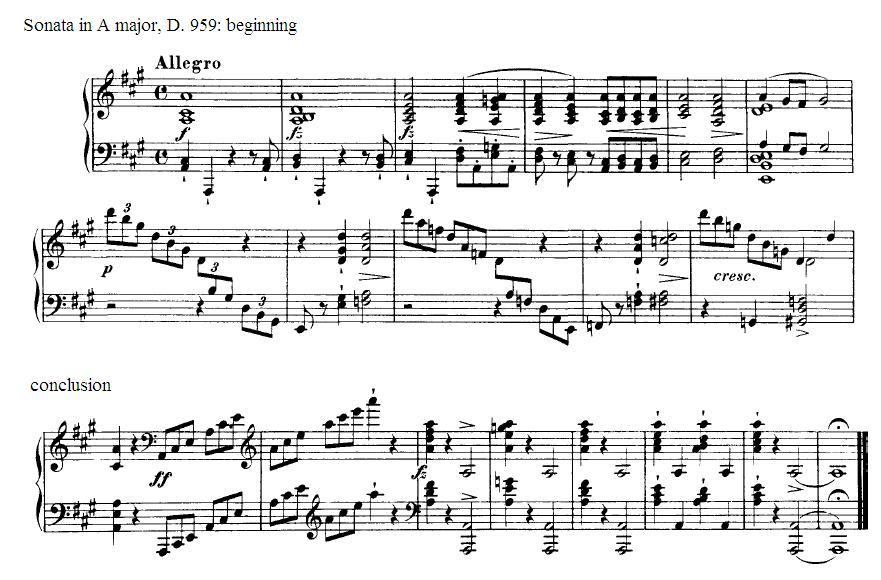
The opening and closing bars of the Sonata in A major. Note the cancrizans relationship in pitch.

The most manifestly cyclical work of the three sonatas is the Sonata in A major. In the sonata's scherzo, a joyous passage in C major is suddenly interrupted by a fierce downward rushing scale in C♯ minor, which closely recalls a parallel passage at the climax of the preceding movement. This is followed in the scherzo by a dance theme whose melody is derived from the Andantino's opening melody. This unique moment is one of the most explicit, audible cyclic references in the sonata trilogy. Another important cyclic element in the A major Sonata is the subtle similarities and connections that exist between each movement's ending and the following movement's opening; the connection between the opening and ending of the sonata as a whole, is even bolder: the sonata ends in a cancrizans of its opening, a framing device which is probably unprecedented in the sonata literature.

As regards the harmonic connections between the sonatas, all three sonatas prominently feature the keys of C major/C minor, D♭ major/C♯ minor, G♭ major/F♯ minor, A major and B♭ major/B♭ minor at points of structural significance. The appearance of these keys throughout the different sonatas is noteworthy as a binding harmonic geography across the trilogy, especially since many of such tonal intrusions would make little sense within the harmonic context of each individual sonata on its own. For example, the keys of C♯ minor and F♯ minor are closely related to the main key of the A major sonata (in which also the major versions of such keys, C♯ major and F♯ major, are featured in the second and fourth movements, respectively); however, the insistently recurring influence of C♯ minor and D♭ major (enharmonic of C♯ major) throughout the C minor sonata, and the even more pervasive presence of D♭ major/C♯ minor and G♭ major/F♯ minor all throughout the B♭ major sonata, could hardly be explained as close tonal relationships; their presence is rendered consistent by their systematic reappearance throughout the trilogy. The same applies to the abrupt juxtapositions of C major and C♯ minor in the second and third movements of the A major sonata, and in the second movement of the B♭ major sonata, which in both cases are reminiscent echoes of the C minor sonata in its C–D♭/C♯ struggle throughout all its four movements. Similarly, the key of A major strikingly ushers into D958's slow movement and in D960's first movement's recapitulation, second movement's middle section and briefly in the third movement; whilst the sonority of B♭ (major or minor) prominently infiltrates the very final cadence of D959's first movement and the recapitulation of D958's fourth movement.

Charles Fisk, also a pianist and music scholar, has described another cyclic element in Schubert's last sonatas – a unifying tonal design, which follows a similar, basic dramatic scheme in each of the three works. According to Fisk, each sonata presents, at its very beginning, the generative kernel of a musical conflict from which all the ensuing music will derive. The first movement, beginning and ending in the sonata's home key, confronts this key with a contrasting tonality or tonal stratum. This dichotomous tonal design is also manifested in both third and final movements, whose openings are variants of the first movement's opening. Moreover, the contrasting tonality becomes the main key of the second movement, thus increasing the harmonic tension in the middle of the sonata, while projecting the first movement's tonal design (home key – contrasting tonality – home key) on the sonata as a whole. In the first half of each sonata, the musical material in the contrasting tonality is presented in sharp conflict with the material in the home key – in each appearance boldly detached from its surroundings. However, in the third movements and especially in the finales, this contrasting tonal realm is gradually integrated into its environment, bringing a sense of unity and resolution to the tonal conflict which was presented at the beginning of the sonata. Fisk goes further to interpret the dramatic musical scheme manifested in the tonal design of the sonatas, as the basis of a unique psychological narrative (see below).

== Allusions to other works by Schubert ==
Besides the internal references that they often make to earlier passages within them, Schubert's last sonatas contain distinct allusions and resemblances to some of his previous works, mostly earlier piano works, as well as many of his songs. Important similarities also exist between certain passages in the sonatas and works from other genres that were composed in parallel, during the same months in 1828.

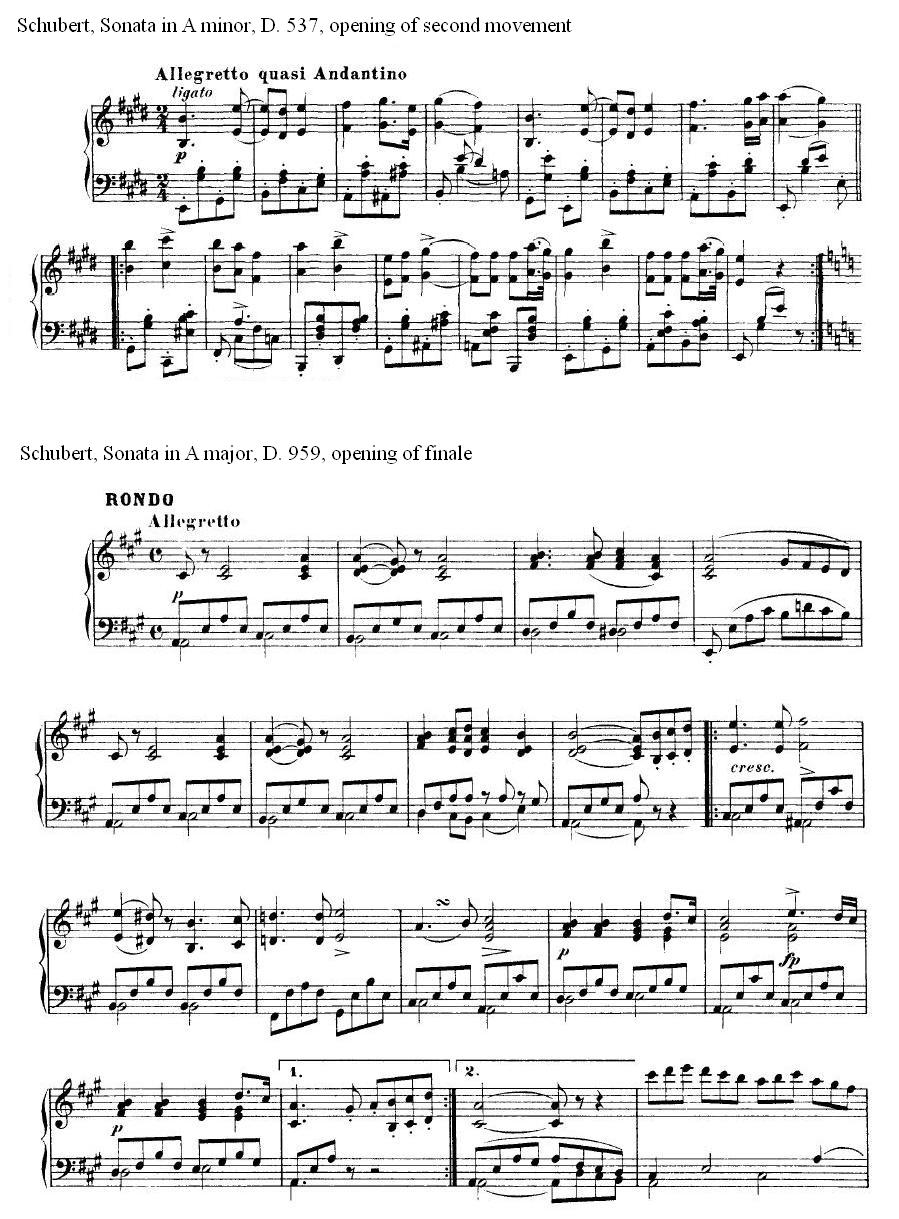
The finale of the A major Sonata uses as its main theme, a transformation and transposition of an earlier theme from the second movement of the Piano Sonata in A minor, D. 537.

The finale of the A major Sonata, uses as its main theme, a transformation of an earlier theme from the second movement of the Piano Sonata in A minor, D. 537. Schubert introduced some changes to the original melody, which make it conform better with the sonata's basic motifs, in accordance with the cyclical scheme of the sonata. Another allusion to an earlier piano work appears in the middle of the sonata's slow movement: after the climax in the middle section of the Andantino, appears a passage (bars 147–158) that closely recalls bars 35–39 from the Impromptu in G♭ major, D. 899.

One important, unique work for solo piano written by Schubert stands apart from his sonatas yet is closely related to them in its concept and style: the Wanderer Fantasy of 1822. The harmonic scheme inherent in each of Schubert's last sonatas, according to Charles Fisk, of a tonal conflict gradually resolved through musical integration, finds its precedent in the Fantasy. Moreover, a tonal stratum which plays a unique role throughout the sonata trilogy – C♯ minor/F♯ minor, is also precedented in the Fantasy as well as the song on which it was based, "Der Wanderer" (of 1816) (Fisk calls C♯ minor "the wanderer's key"). In these two earlier works, and likewise in the last sonatas, passages written in the C♯ minor/F♯ minor stratum portray a sense of alienation, of wandering and homelessness, according to Fisk. The allusion to the song "Der Wanderer" becomes fully explicit when, in the development section of the B♭ Sonata's opening movement, the new theme first presented in this section, undergoes a transformation (in bars 159–160) to become an almost literal quotation of the song's piano introduction.

Another composition from the song genre, also mentioned by Fisk and others as intimately related to the last sonatas and also depicting a feeling of wandering and homelessness, is the Winterreise (A Winter's Journey) song cycle. Numerous connections between different songs from the cycle and the sonatas, especially the C minor Sonata, have been mentioned. For example: in the C minor Sonata, the first movement's development section recalls the songs "Erstarrung" and "Der Lindenbaum"; the second movement and the finale recall the songs "Das Wirtshaus", "Gefror'ne Tränen", "Gute Nacht", "Auf dem Flusse", "Der Wegweiser", and "Einsamkeit". These allusions to Winterreise retain the alienated, lonely atmosphere of its songs.

Several of Schubert's last songs (the Schwanengesang collection), composed during the period of the sketching of the last sonatas, also portray a deep sense of alienation and bear important similarities with specific moments in the sonatas. These include the songs "Der Atlas" (which recalls the opening of the C minor Sonata), "Ihr Bild" (the B♭ major/G♭ major conflict at the opening of the B♭ Sonata), "Am Meer", and "Der Doppelgänger". Additional songs that have been mentioned in analogy to specific passages in the last sonatas include "Im Frühling" (the opening of the A major Sonata's finale), and "Pilgerweise" (the main section of the Andantino in the A major Sonata).

Schubert's famous String Quintet was written in September 1828, together with the final versions of the sonatas. The slow movements of the Quintet and the B♭ Sonata bear striking similarities in their main sections: both employ the same unique textural layout, in which two-three voices sing long notes in the middle register, accompanied by the contrasted, short pizzicato notes of the other voices, in the lower and upper registers; in both movements, the long notes over the relentless ostinato rhythm, convey an atmosphere of complete stillness, of arrest of all motion and time. String quintet textures also appear elsewhere, throughout the sonata trilogy.

== Extramusical connotations and suggestions of a narrative ==
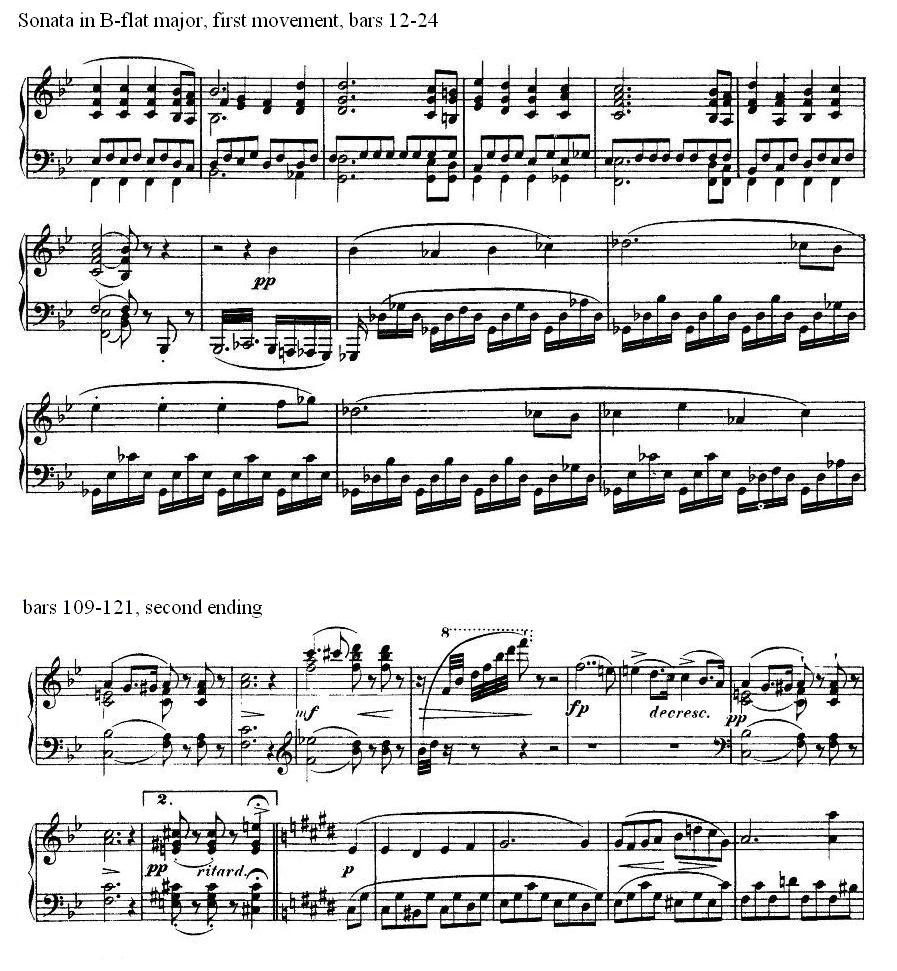
Two sudden, swift changes of tonality, texture, and mood, in the opening movement of the B♭ Sonata, bars 19–20 and 116–17. The tonalities depicted in these two transitions represent, according to Charles Fisk, three distinct tonal strata, conveying contrasting moods, which dominate the entire sonata (these are: B♭–F major; G♭–D♭ major; and C♯–F♯ minor).

Schubert's mature music often manipulates the listener's sense of time and forward movement. Passages creating such an effect appear frequently in the last sonatas, mainly in the first and second movements. Two harmonic devices are employed in the sonatas to create this effect:

- Tonal detachment of passages or complete movements from their home-key surroundings. These passages are often introduced by sudden, "magical" harmonic shifts that closely juxtapose the home key (or a closely related key such as the dominant) with the new, distant tonality. Two examples of this procedure, from the opening movement of the B♭ Sonata, are shown on the right.
- Creation of tonal stasis by rapid oscillation between two contrasting tonalities. Such a device appears in the development sections of the A major and B♭ sonatas, opening movements.

Harmonic manipulations of this kind create a sense of standstill, of arrest of time and motion; they often suggest a feeling of detachment, of entering a new dimension, independent of the preceding material, such as the realm of dreams and memories (if the preceding material is conceived as reality); some tonally detached passages may convey a feeling of an alienated, inhospitable environment, an exile (if the preceding material is conceived as home).

The emotional effect of these passages is often further enhanced by textural and/or cyclical devices, such as a sudden shift of musical texture, concomitant with the shift in tonality; the use of mechanically repetitive accompanimental patterns, such as ostinati and repeated chords, in the tonally remote or oscillating passages; and the allusion to previously stated material, which appeared earlier in the piece, in tonally detached passages. Schubert's frequent use of similar harmonic, textural and cyclical devices in his settings of poems depicting such emotional states, only strengthens the suggestion of these psychological connotations.

Extramusical connotations of this kind have sometimes been used as a basis for the construction of a psychological or biographical narrative, attempting to interpret the musical program behind Schubert's last sonatas. Charles Fisk has suggested that the sonatas portray a protagonist going through successive stages of alienation, banishment, exile, and eventual homecoming (in the A major and B♭ Sonatas), or self-assertion (in the C minor Sonata). Discrete tonalities or tonal strata, appearing in complete musical segregation from one another at the beginning of each sonata, suggest contrasting psychological states, such as reality and dream, home and exile, etc.; these conflicts are further deepened in the ensuing slow movements. Once these contrasts are resolved at the finale, by intensive musical integration and the gradual transition from one tonality to the next, a sense of reconciliation, of acceptance and homecoming, is invoked. Fisk's hypothetical narrative is grounded on the basis of the ample cyclic connections within the sonatas and their unique tonal design, as well as their musical similarities to songs such as Der Wanderer and the Winterreise song cycle; and on biographical evidence concerning Schubert's life, including a story written by Schubert (Mein Traum – My Dream). Fisk suggests that the sonatas convey Schubert's own feelings of loneliness and alienation; by their striving towards musical and tonal integration, the writing of these works offered Schubert a release from his emotional distress, particularly deepened after finishing the composition of the lonely, depressive and hopeless songs of Winterreise, during the preceding year.

It is often suggested that the Last Sonata, in B♭ major, is a farewell work in which Schubert faces his own death (somewhat analogous to the myths surrounding Mozart's Requiem); this is usually ascribed to the relaxed, meditative character which dominates the two opening movements. Death scenes are also associated, somewhat more explicitly, with the more tragic C minor Sonata; Charles Fisk, for example, mentions ghosts and a 'dance of death', in the outer movements. However, when judging from a biographical point of view, the notion that Schubert felt his imminent death at the time of composing the last sonatas is questionable.

== Beethoven's influence ==
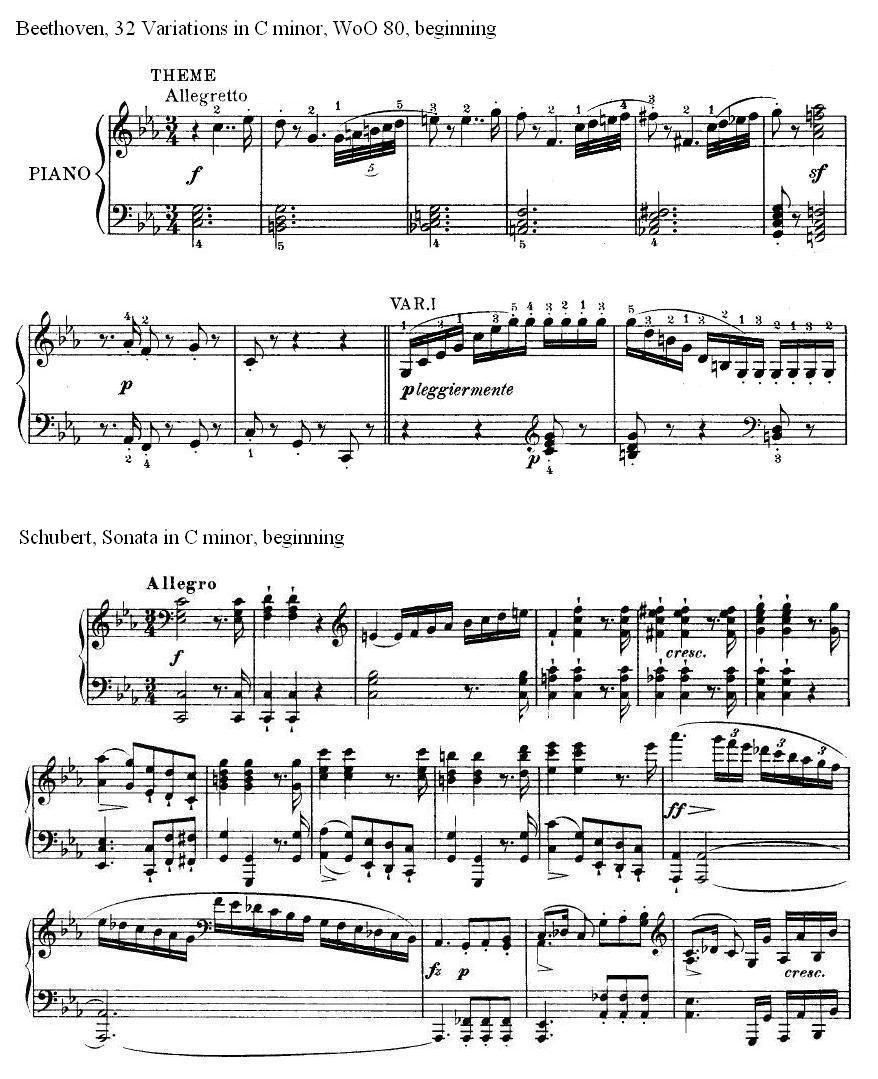
The opening bars of the C minor Sonata quote the theme of Beethoven's 32 Variations written in the same key

It is well acknowledged that Schubert was a great admirer of Beethoven, and that Beethoven had an immense influence on Schubert's writing, especially on his late works. Schubert often borrowed musical and structural ideas from the works of Beethoven, to combine them into his own compositions. There are two outstanding examples for this practice in the last piano sonatas:

1. The opening of the Sonata in C minor is "taken almost note-for-note" from the theme of Beethoven's 32 Variations in C minor, WoO 80.
2. The structure of the finale of the Sonata in A major is borrowed from the finale of Beethoven's Piano Sonata, Op. 31, No. 1, as evident through numerous parallels in structural features.

Numerous additional, less obvious similarities to works by Beethoven have been frequently mentioned in the literature. In these cases, the question of whether or not Schubert had actually borrowed his ideas from Beethoven is open to musicological debate. Here are some examples:

- in the C minor Sonata, certain passages in the first two movements resemble parallel passages from the Piano Sonata No. 8, Op. 13 (the Pathétique), written in the same key.
- in the A major Sonata, bars 200–206 from the end of the development section in the finale recall bars 51–55 from the first movement of the Piano Sonata in C♯ minor, Op. 27, No. 2 (the Moonlight Sonata).
- in the B♭ Sonata, the opening theme of the first movement recalls the opening of the "Archduke" Trio, Op. 97, whereas bars 34–39 recall bars 166–169 from the first movement of the Fifth Piano Concerto, the Emperor; in the latter case, both passages are similarly modified in the recapitulations. The opening of the sonata's finale, in turn, recalls the opening of the rewritten finale from the String Quartet No. 13 B♭ major, Op. 130.

A striking feature of many of these alleged borrowings from Beethoven is that they retain, in their borrowed state, the same structural position they had in Beethoven's original design – they appear in the same movements, at the same structural points. However, despite all this evidence in support of Schubert's borrowing from Beethoven, "he evokes the memory of Beethoven and the classical style, but is no docile follower", as Alfred Brendel points out. "On the contrary, his familiarity with Beethoven's works taught him to be different... Schubert relates to Beethoven, he reacts to him, but he follows him hardly at all. Similarities of motif, texture or formal pattern never obscure Schubert's own voice. Models are concealed, transformed, surpassed". A good example of Schubert's departure from Beethoven's line can be found in his most overt quotation of Beethoven – the opening of the Sonata in C minor. Once Schubert's theme has reached A♭ – the highest note in Beethoven's theme – instead of the original, witty cadence in the tonic, Schubert's theme continues to ascend to higher pitches, culminating fortissimo on another A♭, an octave higher, tonicized as a downward rushing A♭ major scale. From this A♭ major interlude – an evasion of the opening material's harmonic goal, the main generative thematic material for the entire sonata will arise. In this way, what had initially appeared to be a mere note-to-note plagiarism of Beethoven has eventually given way to a radically different continuation, one which invokes Schubert's own, idiosyncratic compositional style.

But perhaps the best example of Schubert's departure from the style of his idol is the finale of the A major Sonata. Although starting from themes of equal length, Schubert's movement is much longer than Beethoven's. The added length comes from the episodes within the rondo structure:

- Schubert's second theme (the B section of the rondo) indulges in a long harmonic and melodic excursion, going through the keys of the subdominant and flat submediant. Beethoven's more traditional short and simple theme merely consists of alternating tonic and dominant harmonies.
- Schubert's development section ends with a long passage in C♯ minor, with no parallel in Beethoven's finale.

Charles Rosen, who unraveled this unique borrowing of a Beethovenian structure in Schubert's A major Sonata, has also referred to Schubert's departure from the former's style in this instance: "Schubert moves with great ease within the form which Beethoven created. He has, however, considerably loosened what held it together, and stretched its ligaments unmercifully... the correspondence of part to whole has been considerably altered by Schubert, and explains why his large movements often seem so long, since they are being produced with forms originally intended for shorter pieces. Some of the excitement naturally goes out of these forms when they are so extended, but this is even a condition of the unforced melodic flow of Schubert's music". Rosen adds, however, that "with the finale of the A major Sonata Schubert produced a work that is unquestionably greater than its model".

== Reception, criticism and influence ==
Schubert's piano sonatas seem to have been mostly neglected during the entire nineteenth century, often dismissed for being too long, lacking in formal coherence, being un-pianistic, etc. However, references to the last sonatas can be found among two nineteenth-century Romantic composers who took serious interest in Schubert's music and were influenced by it: Schumann and Brahms.

Schumann, the last sonatas' dedicatee, reviewed the works in his Neue Zeitschrift für Musik in 1838, upon their publication. He seems to have been largely disappointed by the sonatas, criticizing their "much greater simplicity of invention" and Schubert's "voluntary renunciation of shining novelty, where he usually sets himself such high standards", and claiming the sonatas "ripple along from page to page as if without end, never in doubt as to how to continue, always musical and singable, interrupted here and there by stirrings of some vehemence which, however, are rapidly stilled". Schumann's criticism seems to fit the general negative attitude maintained towards these works during the nineteenth century.

Brahms's attitude towards the last sonatas was different. Brahms found special interest in Schubert's piano sonatas, and expressed his wish to "study them in depth". In her diary, Clara Schumann mentioned Brahms's playing of the B♭ Sonata, and praised his performance. In Brahms's works dating from the early 1860s, a clear Schubertian influence can be observed, in features such as closed lyrical themes, distant harmonic relationships, and use of the three-key exposition. Two of these works, the First String Sextet and the Piano Quintet, contain specific features that resemble Schubert's B♭ Sonata.

The negative attitude towards Schubert's piano sonatas persisted well into the twentieth century. Only around the centennial of Schubert's death did these works begin to receive serious attention and critical acclaim, with the writings of Donald Francis Tovey, and the public performances of Artur Schnabel and Eduard Erdmann. During the following decades, the sonatas, and especially the final trilogy, received growing attention, and by the end of the century, came to be regarded as essential members of the classical piano repertoire, frequently appearing on concert programs, studio recordings, and musicological writings. Some late twentieth century scholars have even argued that Schubert's last sonatas should rank together with Beethoven's most mature sonatas.

== Legacy ==
Schubert's last sonatas mark a distinct change of compositional style from his earlier piano sonatas, with several important differences. The typical movement length has increased, due to the use of long, lyrical, fully rounded-off, ternary-form themes, the insertion of development-like passages within expositions, and the lengthening of the development section proper. Texturally, the orchestral grandeur of the middle-period sonatas gives way to a more intimate writing that resembles a string ensemble. New textures appear in the last sonatas – scale-like melodic elements, free counterpoint, free fantasia, and simple accompanimental patterns such as Alberti bass, repeated chords, and ostinati; the orchestral unison texture, abundant in the preceding sonatas, has disappeared. The harmonic language has also changed: more distant key relationships are explored, longer modulatory excursions, more major/minor shifts of mode, and more chromatic and diverse harmonic progressions and modulations, using elements such as the diminished seventh chord. In general, the last sonatas seem to enact a return to an earlier, more individual and intimate Schubertian style, here combined with the compositional craftsmanship of Schubert's later works.

Certain features of Schubert's last sonatas have been mentioned as unique among his entire output, or even that of his period. Here one can mention the profound level of cyclic integration (especially the cancrizans which "parenthesize" the A major Sonata); fantasia-like writing with a harmonic daring looking forward to the style of Liszt and even of Schoenberg (in the slow movement of the A major Sonata, middle section); exploitation of the piano's ability to produce overtones, both by use of the sustain pedal (in the slow movement of the B♭ Sonata), and without it (in the A major Sonata); and the creation of tonal stasis by oscillating between two contrasting tonalities (in the development sections of the opening movements of the A and B♭ major sonatas).

As mentioned above, Schubert's last sonatas have long been historically neglected, dismissed as inferior in style to Beethoven's piano sonatas. However, the negative view has changed during the late twentieth century, and today these works are usually praised for their conveying of an idiosyncratic, personal Schubertian style, indeed quite different from Beethoven's, but holding its own virtues. In this mature style, the Classical perception of harmony and tonality, and the treatment of musical structure, are radically altered, generating a new, distinct type of sonata form.

Schubert's last sonatas are sometimes compared to Mozart's last symphonies, as unique compositional achievements: both consist of trilogies with one tragic, minor-key work, and two major-key works; both were created during an astoundingly short period of time; and both creating a culmination of the composer's lifetime achievement in their respective genres.

== Performance issues ==
Several key issues are routinely raised by musicians and music scholars, when discussing the performance of Schubert's compositions for piano. These discussions also concern the last piano sonatas. For most of these issues, no general agreement has been reached; for example, to what extent should the sustain pedal be used, how to combine triplets with dotted rhythms, whether to allow tempo fluctuations within the course of a single movement, and whether to observe each repeat sign meticulously.

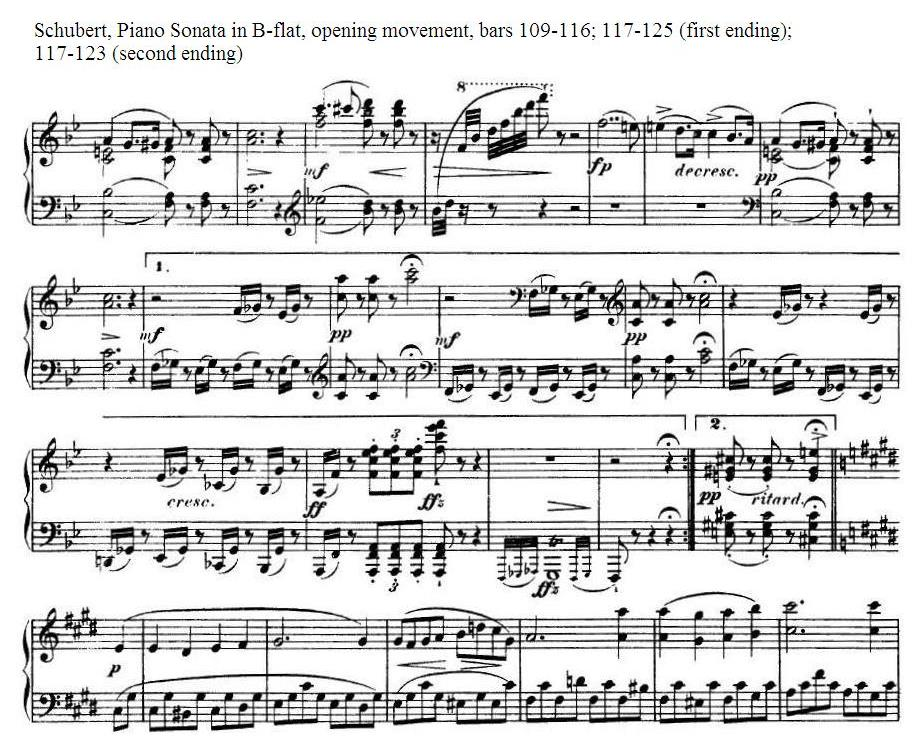
The first ending of the exposition in the B♭ Sonata's opening movement contains nine bars of unique material, which is not repeated elsewhere within the piece.

The issue of repeat signs has been debated particularly in the context of the opening movements of the two last sonatas. Here, as in many of Schubert's sonata form movements, a repeat sign is written for an exceedingly long exposition, while the material of the exposition is repeated a third time in the recapitulation with little alteration. This has led some musicians to omit the exposition repeat when performing these movements. In the last two sonatas, however, unlike other movements, the first ending of the exposition contains several additional bars of music, leading back to the movement's opening. When performing the movement without the repeat, the music in these bars is totally omitted from the performance, as it does not appear in the second ending. Furthermore, in the B♭ sonata, these added bars contain strikingly novel material, which does not appear anywhere else in the piece, and is radically different from the second ending. Pianist András Schiff has described the omission of the repeat in these two movements as "the amputation of a limb". Brendel, on the other hand, considers the additional bars as unimportant and prefers to omit the repeats; with regard to the B♭ sonata, he further claims that the transitional bars are too unconnected to the rest of the movement, and believes that their omission actually contributes to the coherence of the piece.

Another performance issue pertains to the choice of tempi, which is of special relevance in Schubert's major instrumental works, particularly in the opening movements. Schubert often notated his opening movements with moderate tempo indications, the extreme case being the Molto moderato of the B♭ piano sonata. The latter movement in particular, has been interpreted in vastly different speeds. Ever since the famous performances by Sviatoslav Richter, taking the opening movement at an extremely slow pace, similar tempo interpretations for this movement have been frequent. However, the majority of Schubert scholars tend to dismiss such an interpretation, arguing instead for a more flowing pace, a measured allegro.

Some Schubert performers tend to play the entire trilogy of the last sonatas in a single recital, thereby stressing their interrelatedness, and suggesting that they form a single, complete cycle. However, since each of these sonatas is rather long (as compared, for instance, with most of Mozart's or Beethoven's sonatas), such a program may prove exhausting to some listeners. One of the solutions to this problem is to shorten the program by omitting repeats, mainly those of the opening movements' expositions (however, this practice is highly disputed, as noted above). The pioneers of the Schubert sonata performance, Artur Schnabel and Eduard Erdmann, are known to have played the entire trilogy in one evening; more recently, so have Alfred Brendel, Maurizio Pollini, Mitsuko Uchida, and Paul Lewis.

== Available editions and recordings ==
Several highly acclaimed editions of Schubert's last sonatas are available, namely those of Bärenreiter, Henle, Universal, and Oxford University Press. These editions have, however, occasionally received some criticism for the wrong interpretation or notation of Schubert's intentions, on issues such as deciphering the correct pitches from the manuscript, notating tremoli, discriminating between accent and decrescendo markings, and reconstructing missing bars.

The sonatas have been performed and recorded by numerous pianists. Many, especially the devoted Schubert performers, have recorded the entire sonata trilogy (and often all of Schubert's sonatas or his entire piano repertoire altogether). Others have sufficed with only one or two of the sonatas. Of the three sonatas, the last (in B♭) is the most famous and most often recorded. The following is an incomplete list of pianists who have made notable commercial recordings of the sonata trilogy, in full or in part:

- Entire sonata trilogy: Leif Ove Andsnes, Claudio Arrau, Daniel Barenboim, Alfred Brendel (several recordings), Richard Goode, Jenő Jandó, Wilhelm Kempff, Walter Klien, Stephen Kovacevich, Paul Lewis, Alexander Lonquich, Radu Lupu, Murray Perahia, Maurizio Pollini, András Schiff, Martino Tirimo, Mitsuko Uchida, Christian Zacharias.
- Sonata in C minor: Nikolai Lugansky, Sviatoslav Richter.
- Sonata in A major: Vladimir Ashkenazy, Jorge Bolet, Christoph Eschenbach, Eric Lu, Artur Schnabel, Rudolf Serkin, Arcadi Volodos, Krystian Zimerman.
- Sonata in B♭ major: Khatia Buniatishvili, Clifford Curzon, Jörg Demus, Leon Fleisher (two recordings), Marc-André Hamelin, Clara Haskil, Vladimir Horowitz (two recordings), Evgeny Kissin, Anna Malikova, Maria João Pires, Menahem Pressler, Sviatoslav Richter (four recordings), Arthur Rubinstein (two recordings), Artur Schnabel, Rudolf Serkin (two recordings), Grigory Sokolov, Vladimir Sofronitsky, Maria Yudina, Krystian Zimerman.

Recordings on fortepianos:

- Entire sonata trilogy: Andreas Staier (Johann Fritz, Vienna, c. 1825), Tobias Koch (Conrad Graf, Vienna, c. 1835), Paul Badura-Skoda (fortepianos by Conrad Graf and J. M. Schweighofer), Ronald Brautigam (sonatas in A and B♭ only, Paul McNulty after Conrad Graf, 1819), Jan Vermeulen (Nannette Streicher, 1826), András Schiff (Franz Brodmann, Vienna, c. 1820), John Khouri (Joseph Böhm, Vienna, c. 1828).
- Sonata in C minor: Aurelia Vişovan (Robert Brown, 2015, after Jakob Bertsche, c. 1815)
- Sonata in A: Stanley Hoogland (Joseph Böhm, Vienna, c. 1822)
- Sonata in B♭: Gert Hecher (Joseph Brodmann, Vienna, c. 1810), Gerrit Zitterbart (Nannette Streicher und Sohn, 1829), Alain Roudier (Conrad Graf, 1828), Ayako Ito (Chris Clarke, 2000, after Conrad Graf, 1826), Kikuko Ogura (Chris Maene after Steinway, 1836).

== Notes ==
Piano sonatas (2 hands) by Franz Schubert
Preceded by Sonata in G major D. 894	AGA, Series 10 (15 sonatas); No. 13 (D. 958) – No. 14 (D. 959) – No. 15 (D. 960)
Preceded by Sonata in G major D. 894	21 Sonatas numbering system No. 19 (D. 958) – No. 20 (D. 959) – No. 21 (D. 960)
Preceded by Sonata in G major D. 894	23 Sonatas numbering system No. 21 (D. 958) – No. 22 (D. 959) – No. 23 (D. 960)
