= Josef Slavík =

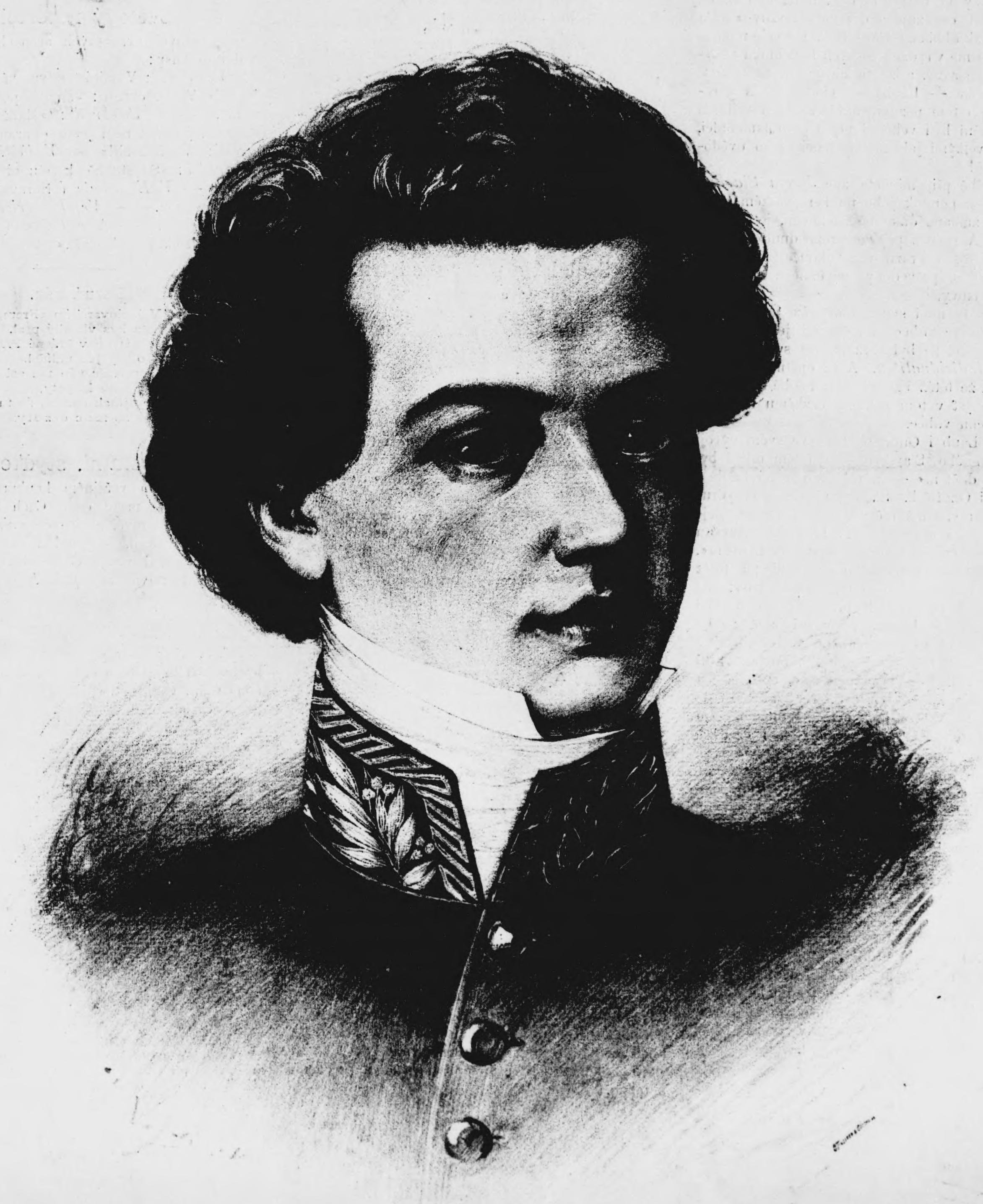

Background information
- Born: 26 March 1806; Jince, Bohemia, Austrian Empire
- Died: 30 May 1833 (aged 27) Budapest, Austrian Empire
- Instrument: Violin

Josef Slavík (26 March 1806 – 30 May 1833) was a Czech violin virtuoso and composer. He was expected by Viennese musical critics to become Paganini's successor after composing a supposedly unplayable Concerto in F♯ minor and teaching himself to play Paganini's "La Campanella" after a single hearing.

== Career ==
The first son of Barbora (born Krásová) and Antonín Slavík, teacher and musician, who started to teach Josef violin in the age of four.

Later on, he was a student of violin by Friedrich Wilhelm Pixis and music theory and composition by Friedrich Dionys Weber at the Prague Conservatory. Before leaving Prague, Slavík played his final concert. He went to Vienna in 1825 and became enjoyed critical success. He was then a young man of nineteen, but already technically superior to other violinists that had been heard in the Austrian capital. The celebrated Mayseder called him a "second Lipinski".

Frédéric Chopin who heard Slavík on several occasions described his skills as: "With the exception of Paganini, I have never heard a player like him. Ninety-six staccatos in one bow! It is almost incredible! He plays like a second Paganini, but a rejuvenated one, who will perhaps in time surpass the first. Slavík fascinates the listener and brings tears into his eyes... he makes humans weep, more he makes tigers weep."

Franz Schubert composed two violin sonata-like pieces for Slavík and pianist Carl Maria von Bocklet: the Rondo in B minor, D 895 (1826), and the Fantasy in C major, D 934 (1827).

His last performance was in 1833 in Vienna, immediately prior to a scheduled tour to Hungary. He was suffering from influenza and played while ill. Shortly after arriving in Budapest, the fever came back and Slavik died, at the age of 27.

== Works ==
- Variations in E major (1820)
- Violin Concerto No.1 in F♯ minor (Conservatory graduation work, 1823)
- "Caprice" in D major, for violin solo (1824)
- "Grand-Potpourri" in E major, for Violin and Orchestra (1825/26)
- "Rondino" for violin and piano (1826)
- Violin concerto No.2 in A minor (orchestration Decledek, 1827)
- Piano Polonese in D major (1828)
- Variations "Il Pirata" (Vincenzo Bellini) on the G-String for Violin and Piano (1832)

== Sources ==
- Niecks, Frederick (2018). Frederick Chopin as a Man and Musician. Books on Demand. ISBN 978-3-73404-572-1.
