= Wilhelmine von Schwertzell =

German author

Wilhelmine von Schwertzell (1787–1863) was a German author, lieder composer, and folklorist who helped Wilhelm Grimm collect fairy tales.

Schwertzell was born in Willingshausen to Luise Freiin von Bozenburg-Stadtfeld and Georg von Schwertzell. Little is known about her education. She met Wilhelm Grimm through her brother Fritz, who studied with Wilhelm in Kassel and Marburg. Wilhelm and Wilhelmine corresponded extensively; at least 75 of their letters survive.

The Brothers Grimm (Jacob and Wilhelm) collected folk or fairy tales from many sources. Schwertzell contributed at least one: Gevatter Tod (Grim Reaper). She also wrote a story about a rune stone and a buried treasure as a gift to Wilhelm on his birthday.

Schwertzell’s music was published by Heinrich Albert Probst (later Kistner & Siegel). Her publications include:

== Book ==
- Leben und liebe eine Novelle [Life and Love: A Novella] (with Franz Horn and Julie von Reutern)

== Fairy Tale ==
- Gevatter Tod (Grim Reaper)

== Music ==
- 12 Lieder for 1, 2, und 3 Singstimmen mit Pianoforte
  - no. 1. “Lied der Vöglein” (text by Ernst Conrad Friendrich Schulze)
  - no. 2. “Jägerlied” (text by Johann Wolfgang von Goethe)
  - no. 3. “Geistliches Abendlied” (text by anonymous)
  - no. 4. “Abschied” (text by Johann Ludwig Uhland)
  - no. 5. “Wächteruf” (text by Johann Peter Hebel)
  - no. 6. “Aus die Fischerin” (text by Goethe)
  - no. 7. “Herbstlied” (text by Johann Ludwig Tieck)
  - no. 8. “Einkehr” (text by Uhland)
  - no. 9. “Aus Genoveva” (text by Tieck)
  - no. 10. “Trost” (text by Friedrich Heinrich Karl and Freiherr de La Motte-Fouqué)
  - no. 11. “Bundeslied” (text by Goethe)
  - no. 12. “An den Mond” (text by Goethe)
