= An Sylvia =

Lied Schubert

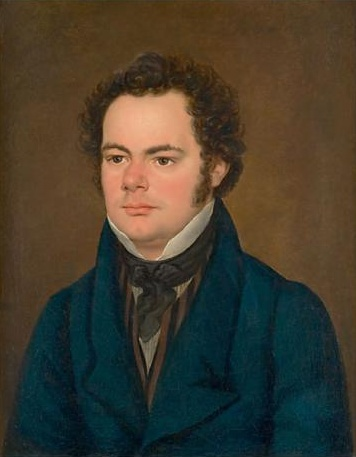
Franz Schubert by Franz Eybl (1827)

"An Sylvia", D 891; Op. 106, No. 4, is a Lied for voice and piano composed by Franz Schubert in 1826 and published in 1828. Its text is a German translation by Eduard von Bauernfeld of "Who is Silvia?" from act 4, scene 2, of The Two Gentlemen of Verona by William Shakespeare. "An Sylvia" was composed during a peak in Schubert's career around the time he was writing the Ninth Symphony "Great" (D 944), two years before his death.

== Creation ==
Although considered to be myth, it is said that Schubert first came up with the idea to write "An Sylvia" as he was walking in Vienna and entered a beer garden with friends. There, he found a volume of Shakespeare on a table and as he was reading, he apparently exclaimed, "Oh! I have such a pretty melody running in my head. If only I had some paper!" His friend drew staves on the back of a menu, and, as it came to his head, Schubert spontaneously wrote melodies to the words he was reading in the play.

The handwritten score was originally entitled "Gesang" and appeared within a small booklet labeled Währing, July 1826 (Währing was a town outside of Vienna where Schubert stayed with his friend Franz von Schober). The score had no tempo markings and served as Schubert's only draft of "An Sylvia" which allowed him to write additional notes in the score over time as ideas came to him. In addition, the title "Gesang" was crossed out and instead "An Sylvia" was written in its place. "An Sylvia" became one of three Shakespeare texts set to music by Schubert; the other two are "Ständchen" ("Hark, hark! the lark") and "Trinklied" ("Bacchus, feister Fürst des Weins", D 888).

Schubert's friend, Franz von Schober, kept the original manuscript and managed Schubert's music after the composer's death. After the Lithographic Institute of Vienna published "An Sylvia" in 1828, Schober published it himself shortly after. In 1829, "An Sylvia" was assigned opus number 106 after Anton Diabelli published the work.

== Composition ==
Schubert-An Sylvia-D 891 n 4, performed by Petrica Ariton and Paloma Camacho during the 2023 International Course for the Interpretation of Lied Wolfram Rieger in Barcelona

"An Sylvia" is written in the key of A major with a time signature of alla breve. A four-bar introduction by the piano is followed by 25 bars, a strophic form identical for each stanza.

== Text ==
The poem introduces Sylvia who is characterized as a beautiful, fair, and innocent woman admired by her suitors. The question becomes whether or not Sylvia is as kind as she is attractive, because only kindness can make her beautiful. When Sylvia is in love with one of the suitors, her eyes appear softer, helping the suitor to see that she is a kind and caring person.

Was ist Sylvia, saget an,
dass sie die weite Flur preist?
Schön und zart seh' ich sie nahn,
auf Himmels Gunst und Spur weist,
|: dass ihr Alles unterthan. :|

Ist sie schön und gut dazu?
Reiz labt wie milde Kindheit;
ihrem Aug' eilt Amor zu,
dort heilt er seine Blindheit,
|: und verweilt in süßer Ruh'. :|

Darum Sylvia tön', o Sang,
der holden Sylvia Ehren!
Jeden Reiz besiegt sie lang,
den Erde kann gewähren:
|: Kränze ihr und Saitenklang! :|

Who is Silvia? What is she,
That all our swains commend her?
Holy, fair, and wise is she;
The heaven such grace did lend her,
That she might admired be.

Is she kind as she is fair?
For beauty lives with kindness.
Love doth to her eyes repair,
To help him of his blindness,
And, being helped, inhabits there.

Then to Silvia let us sing,
That Silvia is excelling;
She excels each mortal thing
Upon the dull earth dwelling:
To her let us garlands bring.

(In fact Kindheit means "childhood" in German, not "kindness". Peter Low's Translating Song: Lyrics and Texts argues that this is not simply a mistranslation as is often stated, but an intelligent trade-off by Bauernfeld to preserve the rhyme at the expense of the meaning; he notes that it is not incompatible with the sense since "Sylvia is presumably young, innocent and good".)

== Dedicatee ==
Schubert dedicated "An Sylvia" to one of his donors, Marie Pachler, a successful woman, talented pianist and composer from Graz who knew Beethoven personally and enjoyed bringing musicians over to her house for entertainment.
