= Der Doppelgänger =

Song composed by Franz Schubert

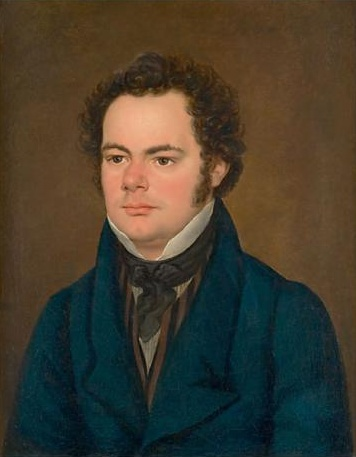
Franz Schubert by Franz Eybl (1827)

"Der Doppelgänger" is one of the six songs from Franz Schubert's Schwanengesang that sets words by Heinrich Heine for piano and tenor voice. It was written in 1828, the year of Schubert's death.

== Text ==
The title "Der Doppelgänger" is Schubert's; in Heine's Buch der Lieder (1827) the poem is untitled, making the ending a surprise. Heine used the spelling "Doppeltgänger".

Still ist die Nacht, es ruhen die Gassen,
In diesem Hause wohnte mein Schatz;
Sie hat schon längst die Stadt verlassen,
Doch steht noch das Haus auf demselben Platz.

Da steht auch ein Mensch und starrt in die Höhe,
Und ringt die Hände, vor Schmerzensgewalt;
Mir graust es, wenn ich sein Antlitz sehe, -
Der Mond zeigt mir meine eigne Gestalt.

Du Doppelgänger! du bleicher Geselle!
Was äffst du nach mein Liebesleid,
Das mich gequält auf dieser Stelle,
So manche Nacht, in alter Zeit?

The night is quiet, the streets are calm,
In this house my beloved once lived:
A long time ago she left the town,
But the house still stands, here in the same place.

A man stands there also and looks to the sky,
And wrings his hands, overwhelmed by pain:
I am terrified – when I see his face,
The moon shows me my own form!

O you Doppelgänger! you pale comrade!
Why do you ape the pain of my love
Which tormented me upon this spot
So many a night, so long ago?

== Context ==
Heine's Buch der Lieder is divided into five sections; all the poems set in Schwanengesang are from the third, Die Heimkehr (The Homecoming). In Schwanengesang, this song stands at the end of the Heine songs, although Heine's order is different and it has been argued that the sequence works better dramatically when the songs are performed in their order of appearance in the Buch der Lieder.

This song's context requires some background in the Doppelgänger mythology to parse. Seeing one's own Doppelgänger in this mythology implies that you are dead, so the middle of the piece reaches a peak as the singer realizes that the stranger is his Doppelgänger.

== Music ==
"Der Doppelgänger" is through-composed; each stanza's setting is different, but not altogether different: the song is a kind of passacaglia on the theme of the first four bars of the piano part. This ambiguous harmonic progression is made of chords that lack one note, leaving it unclear what the harmony is. The first chord lacks a third, so could be B major or B minor. The second has only the interval of a third, so it is unclear whether it is the second inversion of a D♯ minor chord or the first inversion of F♯ major. This ambiguity is only resolved with the entry of the voice, when the harmony of B minor with its dominant, F♯ major, is established.

The piano part, consisting almost entirely of block chords that gradually become denser, dominates the song and does much to give it its feeling of inexorability, and its brief abandonment (displaced by a succession of increasingly dissonant chords) at the climax of the song signals the frantic horror of the poet. At this point, the initially ambiguous harmony returns with a modulation to D♯ minor on the words Was äffst du nach mein Liebesleid (bar 47).

The song is 63 bars long, and in a typical performance lasts between 4 and 5 minutes. It is in the key of B minor, the same as Schubert's Unfinished Symphony.

== References in other medias ==
The poem is referenced in the intro of the PlayStation version of Persona 2 Innocent Sin and also throughout the game's scenario.
