= Johann Gabriel Seidl =

Austrian archeologist, poet, storyteller and dramatist

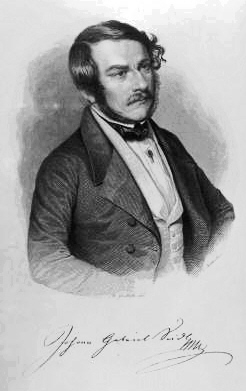
Johann Gabriel Seidl

Johann Gabriel Seidl (21 June 1804 – 18 July 1875) was an Austrian archeologist, poet, storyteller and dramatist. He wrote the lyrics to "Gott erhalte, Gott beschütze unsern Kaiser, unser Land!" This was the 1854 version of the Austrian Imperial Anthem, music by Joseph Haydn ("Gott erhalte Franz den Kaiser").

Born in Vienna, Johann Gabriel Seidl was the son of a lawyer and studied law himself. In 1829, he began to teach at a gymnasium in Celje, Slovenia. In 1840 he became curator at the Coin and Antiquities Museum (Münz- und Antikenkabinett) in Vienna. From 1856 until 1871, he was responsible for the treasury. He spent most of his life in Vienna and died there in 1875.

Besides his scientific studies, Seidl published numerous poems and short stories, including the first poems by Nikolaus Lenau. Many of his poems were set to music by Franz Schubert (such as "Die Taubenpost" from Schwanengesang) and Carl Loewe (for example "Die Uhr"). Besides having written poems in standard German, Seidl also wrote in the Austrian dialect.
