= Ständchen, D 889 (Schubert) =

Lied for solo voice and piano by Franz Schubert

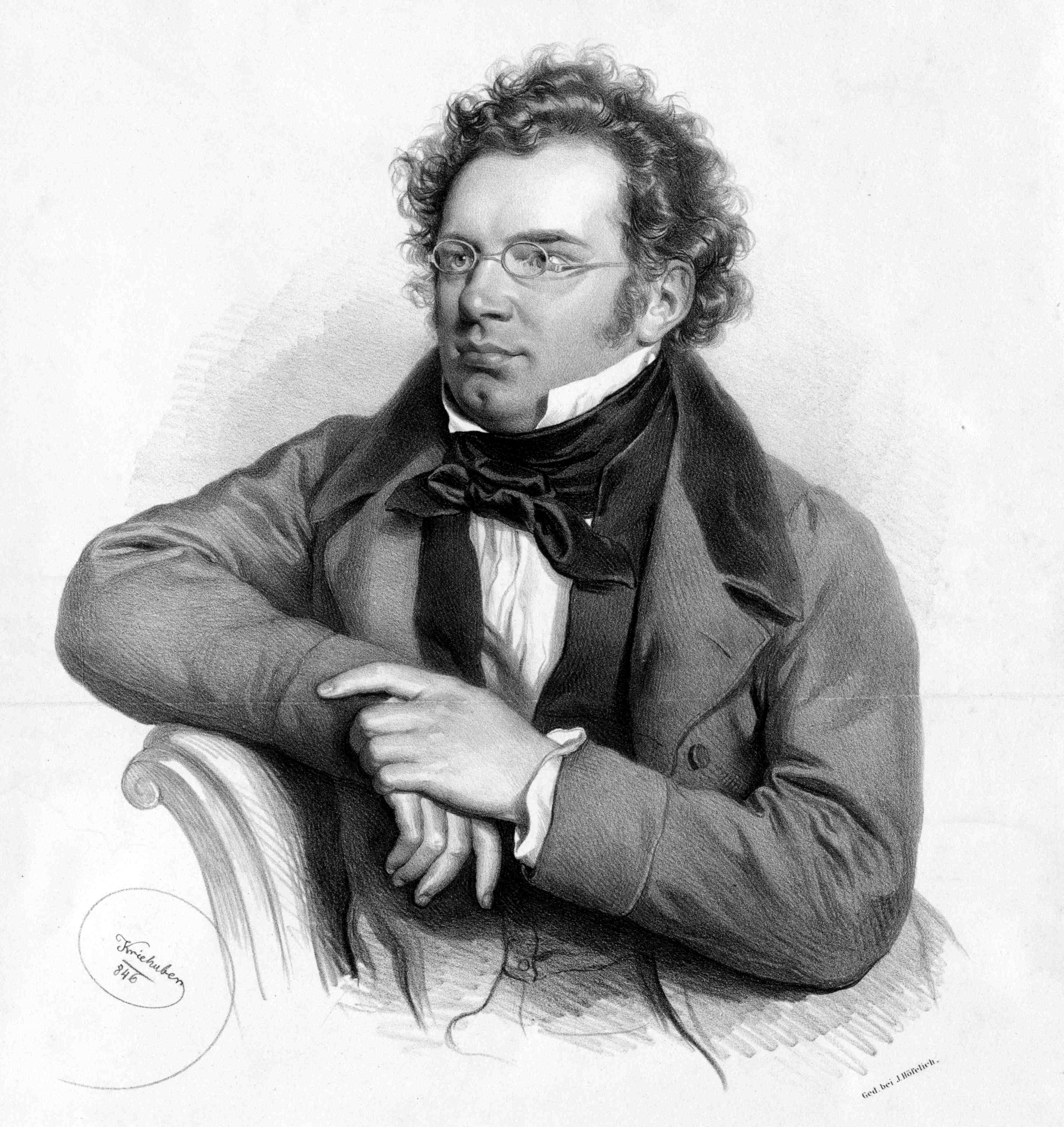
Schubert by Josef Kriehuber (1846 lithograph)

"Ständchen" (known in English by its first line "Hark, hark, the lark"), D 889, is a lied for solo voice and piano by Franz Schubert, composed in July 1826 in the village of Währing (now a suburb of Vienna). It is a setting of the "Song" in Act 2, scene 3 of Shakespeare's Cymbeline. The song was first published by Anton Diabelli in 1830, two years after the composer's death. The song in its original form is relatively short, and two further verses by Friedrich Reil were added to Diabelli's second edition of 1832.

Although the German translation which Schubert used has been attributed to August Wilhelm Schlegel (apparently on the basis of various editions of Cymbeline bearing his name published in Vienna in 1825 and 1826), the text is not exactly the same as the one which Schubert set: and this particular adaptation of Shakespeare had already been published as early as 1810 as the work of Abraham Voß, and again – under the joint names of A. W. Schlegel and Johann Joachim Eschenburg – in a collective Shakespeare edition of 1811.

== Song title ==
In German translations of Cymbeline, the short lyric which Schubert set to music is simply titled Lied (Song). Schubert's title, "Ständchen", is usually translated into English as Serenade, to be sung in the evening, from French: soir. The words of the poem, and its context within the play, indicate that it is unquestionably to be sung in the morning: if there were any doubt, the lines which immediately precede the text of the 'Song' include this snippet of dialogue:

Cloten: It's almost morning, is't not?
First Lord: Day, my lord.

The German word Ständchen is unspecific about the time of the homage. As others have pointed out, and as H. H. Furness in his 'Variorum Edition' of Cymbeline makes abundantly clear, "This present song is the supreme crown of all aubades..." The Schirmer edition of Liszt's transcription for solo piano clarifies the context with the title of Morgenständchen (morning serenade), and the German title of Schubert's song would be more accurately rendered in English as Aubade.

== History ==
The text of the 'Lied' from Shakespeare's Cymbeline which Schubert set differs only very slightly in its orthography ('Ätherblau' etc.) from that of Abraham Voß ('Aetherblau', etc.), which dates from at least 1810. This 'Ätherblau' version was published in 1812 under the names of A. W. Schlegel and J. J. Eschenburg, and then in at least four slightly differing printings of the 'Vienna Shakespeare Editions' in 1825 and 1826, with and without Schlegel's name on the title-page.

A story about the song's creation was recounted by a boyhood friend of Schubert to the composer's biographer, Heinrich Kreissle von Hellborn in his Life of Franz Schubert. Sir George Grove relates Kreissle's anecdote verbatim, although it has been called "pretty, but untrue", "apocryphal", and "legend".

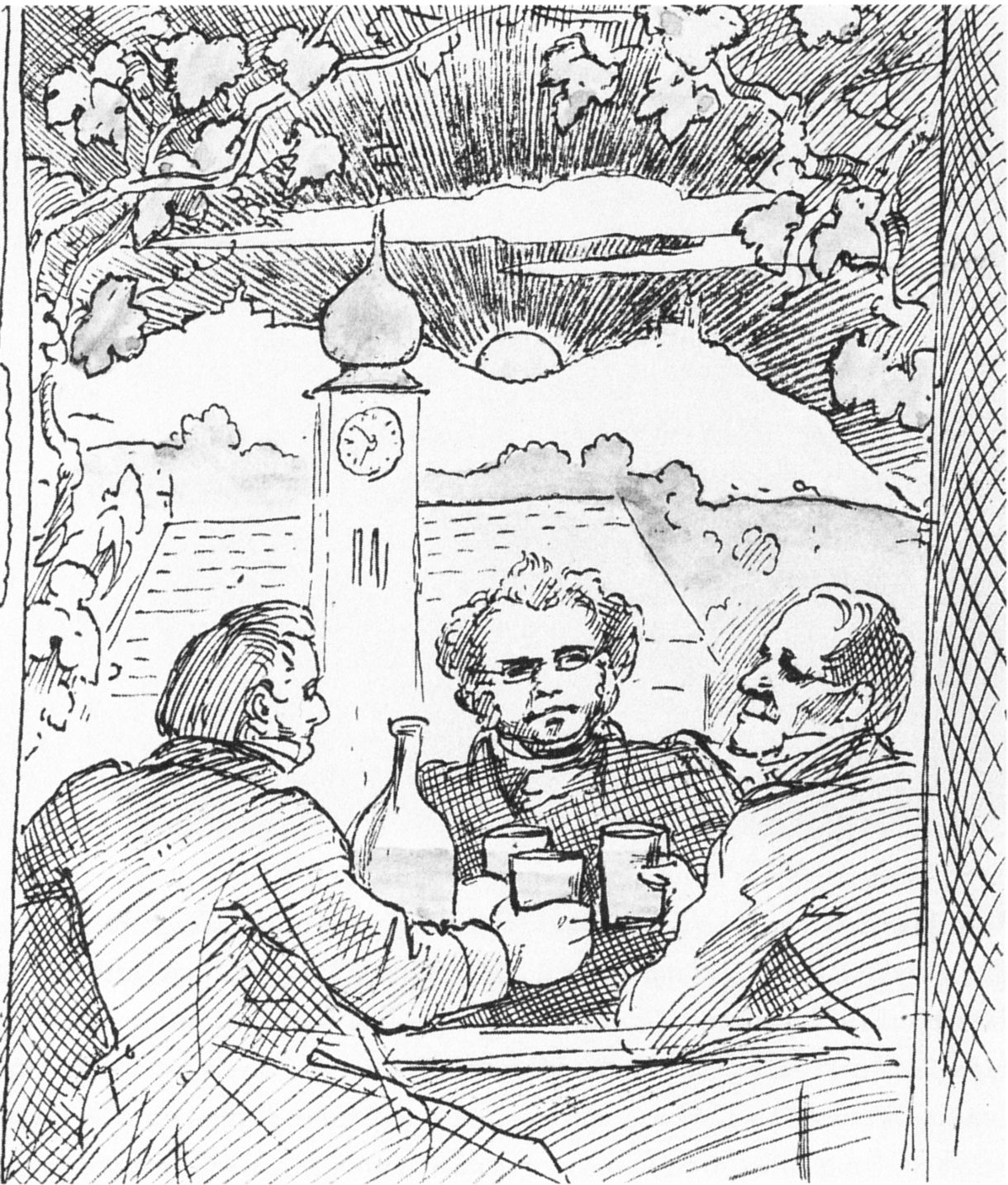
Schubert (centre) at a heuriger in Grinzing with Franz Lachner (l.) and Eduard von Bauernfeld. (Note: Bauernfeld, with F. Mayrhofer von Grünbühel, translated The Two Gentlemen of Verona, from which Schubert set the words "Who is Sylvia?".) Sketch by Moritz von Schwind.

Herr Franz Doppler (of the musical firm of Spina) told me the following story in connection with the "Ständchen": "One Sunday, during the summer of 1826, Schubert, with several friends (Doppler amongst the number), was returning from Pötzleinsdorf to the city, and, on strolling along through Währing, he saw his friend Tieze sitting at a table in the garden of the "Zum Biersack". The whole party determined on a halt in their journey. Tieze had a book lying open before him, and Schubert soon began to turn over the leaves. Suddenly he stopped, and pointing to a poem, exclaimed, "Such a delicious melody has just come into my head, if I but had a sheet of music-paper with me." Herr Doppler drew a few music lines on the back of a bill-of-fare, and in the midst of a genuine Sunday hubbub, with fiddlers, skittle players, and waiters running about in different directions with orders, Schubert wrote that lovely song.

Maurice J. E. Brown, in his critical biography of Schubert, partially debunks the story, showing that the garden of the "Zum Biersack" in Währing was next door to that of the poet Franz von Schober, and that Schubert spent some time there in the summer of 1826 with the painter Moritz von Schwind, although not necessarily staying overnight more than once or twice. Brown thinks that Doppler may have been confused about the place where the incident took place. Brown in his book only mentions Titze twice in passing, however, and not in connection with the story of the menu.

The earliest surviving Schubert autograph manuscript (MS) (Note: Catalogue number LQH0248377 (previously MH 116/c [PhA 1176]) (Deutsch 1978, p. 560).) is in the Wienbibliothek im Rathaus. It consists of four Lieder (of which the "Ständchen" is the second) in a pocket-sized MS book with staves hand-ruled by Schubert. At the top of the first page, in Schubert's hand, is written: Währing, July 1826, followed by his signature. Schubert set the lied in the key of C major.

1. "Trinklied", D888 – (Antony & Cleopatra, act 2, scene 7 – trans. Eduard Bauernfeld & Ferdinand Mayrhofer von Grünbühel)
2. "Ständchen", D889 ("Hark, hark, the lark") – (Cymbeline, act 2, scene 3 – possibly not trans. by Schlegel)
3. "Hippolits Lied", D890 – by Friedriech von Gerstenberg
4. Gesang, D891 ("Was ist Sylvia?") – (Two Gentlemen of Verona, act 4, scene 2 – trans. Bauernfeld alone)

=== Text ===
1. Modern English version

Hark, hark, the lark at heaven's gate sings ,
and Phoebus 'gins arise ,
His steeds to water at those springs
on chalic'd flowers that lies :
And winking Mary-buds begin
to ope their golden eyes
With every thing that pretty is,
my Lady sweet arise :
Arise, arise.

2. Schubert MS, 1826; 1st edition, 1828

Horch, horch, die Lerch' im Ätherblau,
und Phöbus, neu erweckt,
tränkt seine Rosse mit dem Tau,
der Blumenkelche deckt.
Der Ringelblume Knospe schleusst
die goldnen Äuglein auf;
mit allem, was da reitzend ist;
du, süsse Maid, steh auf!
Steh auf, steh auf.

3. Fairly literal translation

Hark, hark, the lark in the aether blue,
and Phoebus, fresh awake
Waters his steeds with the dew
which covers the flowers' chalice.
The marigold's bud ope[n]s
its little golden eye;
with everything that is adorable;
Thou, sweet maid, arise!
arise, arise.

The German translation that Schubert set has the same metre/rhythm as Shakespeare's lyric, which allows the music to be sung to the original English words.

== Critical reception ==
Schubert's biographer John Reed (1909–1999) says that the song "celebrates the universality of two of the world's greatest song-writers." Richard Capell in his survey of Schubert's songs, called the Ständchen "very pretty" but "a trifle overrated [...] the song is hardly one to be very fond of. Not a lifetime of familiarity with it can bridge the gap that yawns between the Elizabethan's verse and the Austrian's tune." On the other hand, while discussing the variorum readings of Shakespeare's play, Howard Furness refers to "the version which Schubert sets to peerless music", and Sir George Grove describes how "that beautiful song, so perfectly fitting the words, and so skilful and happy in its accompaniment, came into perfect existence."

=== Publication ===
Schubert's song was published posthumously as "Ständchen von Shakespeare" in part seven of Diabelli's first edition of Schubert's songs (Schubert 1830, p. 3). See § Ex. 2 above. The text of Schubert's autograph is exactly reproduced in the first published edition of the song (Schubert 1830, pp. 14–15 [16–17]), except for some very minor punctuation. (Note: Namely, the comma after du in the last line, which the 1832 edition (Schubert 1832) correctly omits, although it also removes the comma after "Phöbus". In the manuscript, Schubert appears to use a sort of rounded u sign (or more like a long horizontal bar rounded at the end), in order to distinguish clearly all instances of the letter u without umlaut (diaresis) from a ü. In "Was ist Sylvia?" he uses a vertical sign looking like a walking-stick to highlight the inserted bars of the piano accompaniment.) Fair autograph copies of two of the four songs in the Vienna Library MS ("Trinklied" and "Was ist Silvia?") are held in the Hungarian National Library (National Széchényi Library).

Two further verses were added to the song by Friedrich Reil (1773–1843) for the second edition (Schubert 1832); the Peters edition in the original key retains the attribution to 'Shakespeare'. Both the Breitkopf & Härtel edition of 1894–95, and in the Peters edition for low voice credit A. W. Schlegel with the words. Otto Deutsch in his 1951 Schubert Thematic Catalogue entry for D889 also gives "deutsch von August Wilhelm Schlegel", with no further details.

=== Arrangements ===
"Ständchen" has been arranged for various instrumental combinations, including Franz Liszt's transcription for solo piano, published by Diabelli in 1838 as no. 9, "Ständchen von Shakespeare", of his 12 Lieder von Franz Schubert, S.558.

== Sources ==
- Blinn, Hansjürgen; Schmidt, Wolf Gerhard (2003). Shakespeare – deutsch: Bibliographie der Übersetzungen und Bearbeitungen (in German). Berlin: Erich Schmidt Verlag. ISBN 9783503061938.
- Brown, Maurice J. E. (1958). Schubert: a critical biography. London, New York: Macmillan / St. Martin's Press.
- Capell, Richard (1929). Schubert's songs. New York: E. P. Dutton.
- Dahms, Walter (1918). Schubert (in German). Berlin: Schuster & Loeffler.
- Deutsch, Otto (1978). Franz Schubert, thematisches Verzeichnis seiner Werke in chronologischer Folge (in German). Kassel: Bärenreiter. ISBN 9783761805718.
- Drewing, Lesley M. (1993). Voß Shakespeare translation. An assessment to the contribution made by Johann Heinrich Voß and his sons to the theory and practice of Shakespeare translation in Germany (PDF) (D. Phil. dissertation) (in English and German). University of Durham.
- Eschenburg, J. J. (1805). William Shakspeare's Schauspiele / Neue, ganz umgearbeitete Ausgabe von Johann Joachim Eschenburg / Eilfter Band. Vol. 11. (contains Cymbelin, Titus Andronikus, König Lear). Zürich: Orell, Füßli & Co.
- Feurzeig, Lisa (2014). Schubert's Lieder and the Philosophy of Early German Romanticism. Ashgate Publishing. ISBN 9781472401298.
- Fischer-Dieskau, Dietrich (1976). Schubert: a biographical study of his songs. London: Cassell.
- Furness, Howard Horace, ed. (1913). A New Variorum Edition of Shakespeare: The Tragedie of Cymbeline. Philadelphia and London (John Street, Adelphi): J. B. Lippincott.
- Grove, George (1951). Beethoven – Schubert – Mendelssohn. London: Macmillan & Co.
- Hanmer, Thomas (1744). The works of Shakespear in 9 volumes. With a glossary. Carefully printed from the Oxford edition in quarto, 1744. Nil ortum tale. Hor. London: J. and P. Knapton et mult. al. (For Horace, see Stone 2005, p. 286)
- Hubbard, James Mascarene (1880). Catalogue of the works of William Shakespeare / original and translated / together with the Shakespeariana embraced in the Barton Collection of the Boston Public Library. Boston: Printed by order of the Trustees.
- Johnson, Graham (1996). "Ständchen 'Horch, horch! die Lerch', D889". Hyperion Records.
- Johnson, Graham (1996). "An Silvia 'Gesang an Silvia', D891". Hyperion Records.
- Keßler, Georg Wilhelm (trans.) (1809). Shakespeare's Cymbeline. Berlin: Julius Eduard Hißig. was reprinted in (C90. Mehrer Verfassen)
- Kreissle von Hellborn, Heinrich (1869). Coleridge, Arthur D.; Grove, George (eds.). The Life of Franz Schubert. (in 2 volumes). London: Longman, Green and Co. Volume 1 Volume 2
- Pohl, Carl Ferdinand (1900). "Kreissle von Hellborn, Heinrich" . In Grove, George (ed.). A Dictionary of Music and Musicians. Vol. 2.3. London: Macmillan and Company. p. 71.
- Pope, Alexander (1723). The Works of Mr. William Shakespear / Volume the Sixth / consisting of / Tragedies from Fable. The works of Shakespear in six volumes.
- Pope, Alexander; Warburton, William (1747). The Works of Shakespear: Volume the Seventh. Containing, Julius Caesar. Antony and Cleopatra. Cymbeline. Troilus and Cressida. Dublin: Printed for R. Owen, J. Leathley, G. and A. Ewing, W. and J. Smith, G.Faulkner, P. Crampton, A. Bradley, T. Moore, E. and J. Exshaw.
- Reed, John (1997). The Schubert Song Companion. Manchester University Press. ISBN 9781901341003.
- Tieck, Dorothea; Baudissin, Wolf, eds. (1833). William Shakespeares dramatische Werke / Uebersetz von A. W. Schlegel, ergänzt und erläutert von Ludwig Tieck. Vol. 9. Translated by Schlegel, A. W. Berlin: G. Reimer.
- Schubert, Franz (July 1826). "Sammelmanuskript [fing. Titel]" (in German). [contains MS of "Trinklied", "Ständchen", "Hyppolits Lied" and "Gesang" ("Was ist Silvia?"), D888–891].
- Schubert, Franz (26 October 1830). Franz Schubert's nachgelassene musikalische Dichtungen für Gesang und Pianoforte (in German). (Plate no. 3704). Vienna: Ant.[on] Diabelli & Comp.[agnie]. The actual page:
- Schubert, Franz (1832). Diabelli, Anton (ed.). Ständchen von Shakespeare. (Horch, horch, die Lerch' im Aetherblau) / in Musik gesetzt von Franz Schubert. Philomele : eine Sammlung der beliebtesten Gesänge mit Begleitung des Pianoforte / eingerichtet und hrsg. von Anton Diabelli; No. 294 (in German). Plate number D. et C. No 4059. Vienna: Diabelli et Comp.
- Stone, Jon R. (2005). Routledge Dictionary of Latin Quotations: The Illiterati's guide to Latin Maxims, Mottoes, Proverbs, and Sayings. New York, London: Routledge. ISBN 0-415-96909-3.
- Vincent, Charles, ed. (1916). Fifty Shakespere songs for high voice. Boston: Oliver Ditson Company.
- Voß, Abraham (1828). Shakespeare's Schauspiele / von Johann Heinrich Voß / und dessen Söhne / Heinrich Voß und Abraham Voß /mit Erläuterungen/ Achtes Bandes erste Abtheilung. (also contains Hamlet by J. H Voß, and Die lustige Weiber von Windsor by Heinrich Voß). Stuttgart: J. B. Metzler'chen Buchhandlung.
- Voß, Heinrich; Voß, Abraham (trans.) (1810). Schauspiele von William Shakespeare: Erster Band [Macbeth & Cymbeline] (in German). Tübingen: J. G. Cotta'schen Buchhandlung. Title page, p. 125
- Youens, Susan (1997). "Schubert and his poets: issues and conundrums". In Gibbs, Christopher H. (ed.). The Cambridge Companion to Schubert. Cambridge University Press. ISBN 9780521484244.
