= Rondo in B minor for violin and piano, D 895 (Schubert) =

Piece of music by Franz Schubert

Rondo in B minor for violin and piano Rondeau brillant, D 895
Performed by Dénes Zsigmondy (violin) and Anneliese Nissen (piano)

Franz Schubert's Rondo in B minor for violin and piano, D 895 was composed in 1826.

It was the first piece for violin and piano that Schubert had composed for almost a decade. It was written for the twenty-year-old Czech violinist Josef Slavik (who also commissioned Schubert's Fantasy in C, D 934 in 1827), and was first performed by Slavík with the pianist Karl Maria von Bocklet in 1827.

Artaria published the score in April 1827 as Rondeau brillant, Op. 70, and is the only one of Schubert's six violin-piano works to reach print during his lifetime.

== Structure ==
The composition starts with an introductory "Andante", followed by an "Allegro" (A-B-A-C-A). The ensuing coda contains reminiscences of the theme of the "Andante" and of the "B" episode of the "Allegro". It ends in a section marked "Più mosso" in the score, in B major.
