= Schwanengesang =

Collection of songs written by Franz Schubert

First volume of Schubert's Schwanengesang as originally published in 1829

Schwanengesang (Swan Song), D. 957, is a collection of 14 songs written by Franz Schubert at the end of his life and published posthumously:

1. Liebesbotschaft (text: Ludwig Rellstab)
2. Kriegers Ahnung (Rellstab)
3. Frühlingssehnsucht (Rellstab)
4. Ständchen (Rellstab)
5. Aufenthalt (Rellstab)
6. In der Ferne (Rellstab)
7. Abschied (Rellstab)
8. Der Atlas (Heinrich Heine)
9. Ihr Bild (Heine)
10. Das Fischermädchen (Heine)
11. Die Stadt (Heine)
12. Am Meer (Heine)
13. Der Doppelgänger (Heine)
14. Die Taubenpost (alternative: D. 965a) (Johann Gabriel Seidl)

The autograph manuscript of the collection is preserved in the Morgan Library & Museum.

== Background ==
Named by its first publisher, Tobias Haslinger, who presumably wished to present it as Schubert's last testament, Schwanengesang differs from the earlier Die schöne Müllerin and Winterreise song-cycles by including settings of more than one poet. Seven texts by Ludwig Rellstab (1799–1860) are followed by six by Heinrich Heine (1797–1856); inclusion of the last song, to words by Johann Gabriel Seidl (1804–1875), may or may not reflect Schubert's wishes. In any case, all 14 songs were composed in 1828 and the collection was published in 1829, a few months after the composer's death.

== Composition and publication ==
4. "Ständchen" ("Serenata")
Sung in Italian by Beniamino Gigli accompanied by members of the orchestra of La Scala, conducted by Carlo Sabajno (1933)

8. "Der Atlas" (choir)
Performed by Kammerchor Nikolasseee, Berlin (2:10)

13. "Der Doppelgänger" (3:21)
Ukrainian words by M. Rylski. Sung by Mark Serdyuk accompanied by Grigory Hansburg (piano)

The Rellstab and Heine settings were copied in a single sitting on consecutive pages of the manuscript in Schubert's hand, and Seidl's Die Taubenpost is considered to be Schubert's last Lied — thus the basis for Haslinger's sequence, one accepted by posterity together with his conceit that a cycle exists at all. (The true cycles Die schöne Müllerin and Die Winterreise had sold well, motivating the publisher.) The title Schwanengesang is not the composer's but all the song titles are; Heine, for one, did not name his poems.

=== An uncertain cycle ===
On 2 October 1828, after the manuscript had been written, Schubert offered the Heine set of six songs to a Leipzig publisher by the name of Probst. We can assume, then, that Schubert, at least in the beginning, intended two separate single-poet collections. Furthermore the order of nos. 8–13, as they appear in the manuscript, differs from that of the poems as Heine published them: 10, 12, 11, 13, 9, 8, which in any case were not consecutive, as the table below shows. It was customary for Schubert to respect the poet's sequence; the manuscript may not represent Schubert's desired order. The Seidl song, "Die Taubenpost", has no connection to the rest of the cycle and was appended by Haslinger at the end to round up all of Schubert's last compositions.

== The songs ==
The songs of Schwanengesang as found in Schubert's manuscript:

Poems by Ludwig Rellstab:
Title	Order in ms.	Key	Subject
"Liebesbotschaft" ("Message of love")	1	G major	The singer invites a stream to convey a message to his beloved.
"Kriegers Ahnung" ("Warrior's foreboding")	2	C minor	A soldier encamped with his comrades sings of how he misses his beloved, and how he fears the prospect of dying, or losing his courage, in battle.
"Frühlingssehnsucht" ("Longing in spring time")	3	B♭ major	The singer is surrounded by natural beauty but feels melancholy and unsatisfied until his beloved can "free the spring in my breast".
"Ständchen" ("Serenade")	4	D minor–major	The singer exhorts his lover to make him happy.
"Aufenthalt" ("Resting place")	5	E minor	The singer is consumed by anguish for reasons we aren't told, and likens his feelings to the river, forest and mountain around him.
"In der Ferne" ("In the distance")	6	B minor	The singer has fled his home, broken-hearted, and complains of having no friends and no home; he asks the breezes and sunbeams to convey his greetings to the one who broke his heart.
"Abschied" ("Farewell")	7	E♭ major	The singer bids a cheery but determined farewell to a town where he has been happy but which he must now leave.

Poems by Heinrich Heine:
Title	Order in ms.	in Heine's Heimkehr	Key	Subject
"Der Atlas"	8	24	G minor	Having wished for an eternity of either happiness or wretchedness, the narrator blames himself for the weight of sorrow that he now bears, like the giant Atlas.
"Ihr Bild" ("Her image")	9	23	B♭ minor	The singer imagines that the beloved's portrait favoured him with a smile and a tear; but alas, he has lost her.
"Das Fischermädchen" ("The fisher-maiden")	10	8	A♭ major	The singer tries to sweet-talk a fishing girl into a romantic encounter, drawing parallels between his heart and the sea.
"Die Stadt" ("The city")	11	18	C minor	The singer is in a boat rowing towards the city where he lost the one he loved; it comes foggily into view.
"Am Meer" ("By the sea")	12	14	C major	The singer tells of how he and his beloved met in silence beside the sea, and she wept; since then he has been consumed with longing — she has poisoned him with her tears.
"Der Doppelgänger" ("The double")	13	20	B minor	The singer looks at the house where his beloved once lived, and is horrified to see someone standing outside it in torment — it is, or appears to be, none other than himself, aping his misery of long ago.

Poem by Johann Gabriel Seidl:
Title	Order in ms.	Key	Subject
"Die Taubenpost" ("The pigeon post")	14	G major	This song is often considered the last Lied that Schubert ever wrote. It was included into the cycle by the first editor and is almost always included in modern performances. In it, the singer declares that he has a carrier pigeon whose name is "Longing".

== Another Schwanengesang ==
Schubert had earlier in his career set to music a single poem titled Schwanengesang, his D. 744, by Johann Senn.

== Liszt transcriptions ==
Franz Liszt later transcribed the entire set for solo piano. While staying faithful to Schubert's original, he often changes the piano texture as a way of providing a personal commentary on the text and music. Liszt reordered the songs in the following way: 11, 10, 5, 12, 7, 6, 4, 9, 3, 1, 8, 13, 14 and 2.

== See also ==
- List of songs by Franz Schubert
- List of compositions by Franz Schubert
