= Im Frühling =

1826 lied by Franz Schubert

- Lied by Franz Schubert
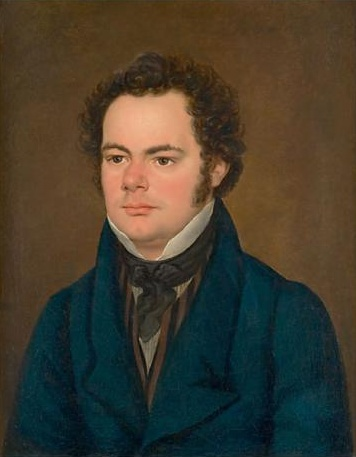
- Portrait of Franz Schubert by Franz Eybl (1827)
- Key: G major
- Catalogue: D. 882
- Opus: 101
- Text: "Im Frühling" by Ernst Schulze
- Language: German
- Composed: 1826
- Scoring: voice; piano

"Im Frühling" ("In Spring") (Op. 101, no. 1, D. 882) in G major is a Lied by Austrian composer Franz Schubert.

Schubert composed the song in 1826 to a poem by Ernst Schulze (1789–1817) as part of ten poems by Schulze he set to music; they were part of Schulze's Poetic Diary which he wrote from 29 June 1813 until 17 February 1817. Schulze's original title was "On the 31st of March 1815". The poems were published by Brockhaus in 1822, the most probable source for Schubert.

== Text ==
Still sitz' ich an des Hügels Hang,
der Himmel ist so klar,
das Lüftchen spielt im grünen Tal.
Wo ich beim ersten Frühlingsstrahl
einst, ach so glücklich war.

Wo ich an ihrer Seite ging
so traulich und so nah,
und tief im dunkeln Felsenquell
den schönen Himmel blau und hell
und sie im Himmel sah.

Sieh, wie der bunte Frühling schon
aus Knosp' und Blüte blickt!
Nicht alle Blüten sind mir gleich,
am liebsten pflückt ich von dem Zweig,
von welchem sie gepflückt!

Denn alles ist wie damals noch,
die Blumen, das Gefild;
die Sonne scheint nicht minder hell,
nicht minder freundlich schwimmt im Quell
das blaue Himmelsbild.

Es wandeln nur sich Will und Wahn,
es wechseln Lust und Streit,
vorüber flieht der Liebe Glück,
und nur die Liebe bleibt zurück,
die Lieb und ach, das Leid.

O wär ich doch ein Vöglein nur
dort an dem Wiesenhang
dann blieb ich auf den Zweigen hier,
und säng ein süßes Lied von ihr,
den ganzen Sommer lang.
