= Eduard von Bauernfeld =

Austrian dramatist

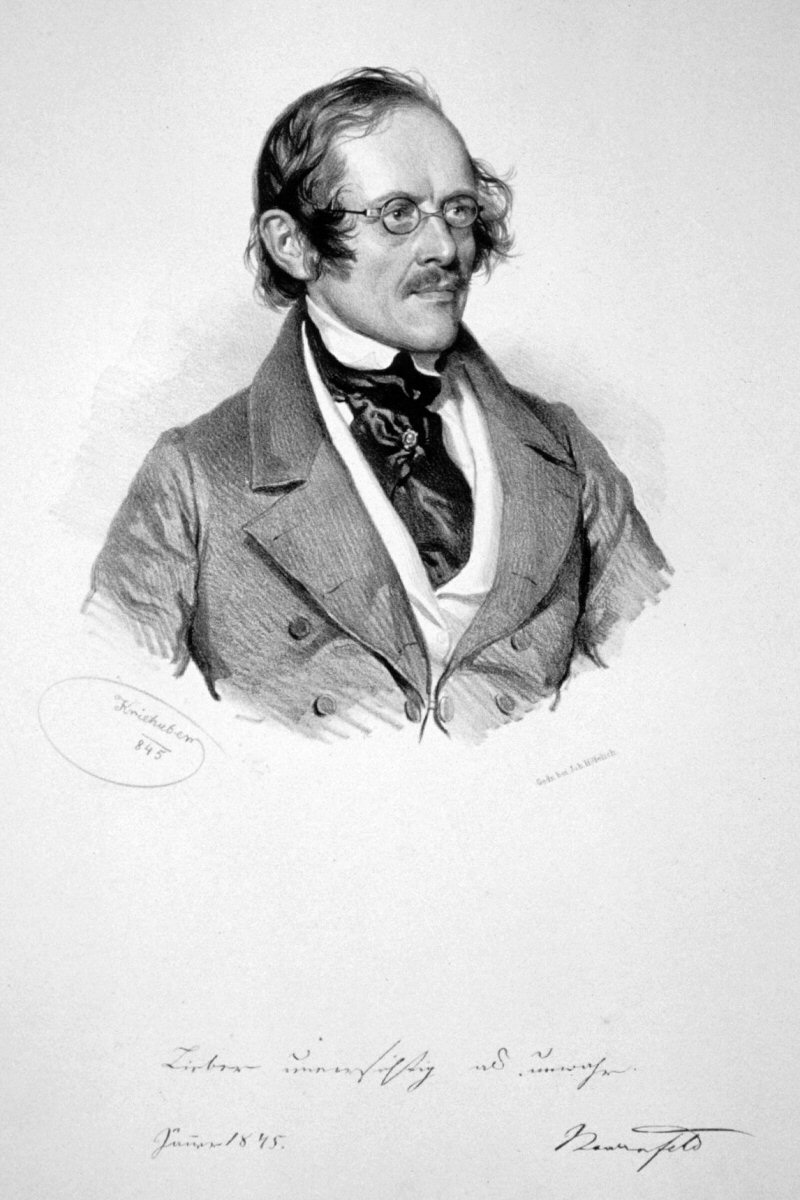
- Born: 13 January 1802
- Died: 9 August 1890 (aged 88)
- Other name: "Rusticocampus" or "Feld"
- Occupation: Playwright

Eduard von Bauernfeld (13 January 1802 – 9 August 1890) was an Austrian dramatist, born in Vienna.

== Life ==
Having studied jurisprudence at the University of Vienna, he entered the government service in a legal capacity, and after holding various minor offices was transferred in 1843 to a responsible post on the Lottery Commission. He had already embarked upon politics, and severely criticized the government in a pamphlet, Pie Desideria eines österreichischen Schriftstellers (1842); and in 1845 he made a journey to England, after which his political opinions became more pronounced. After the Revolution, in 1848, he quit the government service in order to devote himself entirely to letters. He lived in Vienna until his death, and was ennobled for his work.

As a writer of comedies and farces, Bauernfeld takes high rank among the German playwrights of the century; his plots are clever, the situations witty and natural and the diction elegant. His earliest essays, the comedies Leichtsinn aus Liebe (1831); Des Liebes-Protokoll (1831) and Die ewige Liebe (1834); Burgerlich und Romantisch, (1835) enjoyed great popularity. Later he turned his attention to so-called Salonstücke (drawing-room pieces), notably Aus der Gesellschaft (1866); Moderne Jugend (1869), and Der Landfrieden (1869), in which he portrays in fresh, bright and happy sallies the social conditions of the capital in which he lived.

A complete edition of Bauernfeld's works, Gesammelte Schriften, appeared in 12 vols. (Vienna, 1871–1873); Dramatischer Nachlass, ed. by F. von Saar (1893); selected works, ed. by E. Horner (4 vols., 1905). See A. Stern, Bauernfeld, Ein Dichterporträt (1890), Rudolf von Gottschall, "E. von Bauernfeld" (in Unsere Zeit, 1890), and E. Horner, Bauernfeld (1900).

From about 1825 (though he had met him earlier, and enjoyed some of his stage works) until his death in 1828, Bauernfeld was a friend of the composer Franz Schubert. The famous Schubert song An Sylvia used Bauernfeld's translation of Shakespeare: Schubert also set a handful of original Bauernfeld poems. At his death Schubert left an unfinished opera Der Graf von Gleichen to a libretto by Bauernfeld. There are Memoirs of Schubert and his circle (including the painter Moritz von Schwind who Bauernfeld had known from the Gymnasium (school) in Vienna and remained close friends with until old age) from Bauernfeld in Deutsch's book Schubert Memoirs by his friends.

Bauernfeld's secret beloved was Clotilde Dornau (1805–1885).

He also used the pseudonyms "Rusticocampus" or "Feld".

== See also ==
- List of Austrian writers
