= Rita Steblin =

Canadian musicologist (1951–2019)

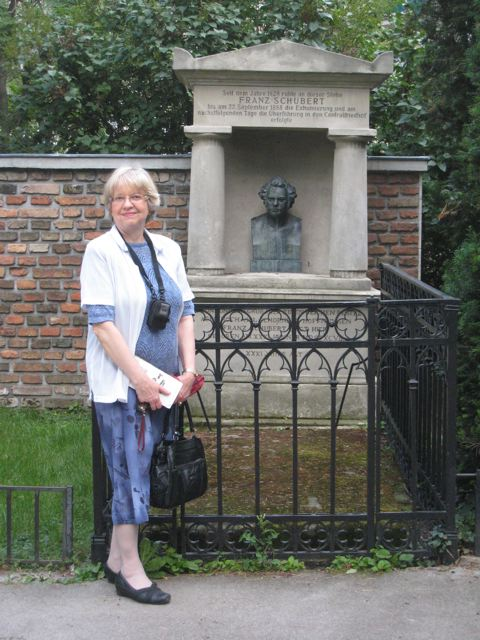
- Steblin at the grave of Franz Schubert in Währing, Vienna, June 2012
- Born: April 22, 1951; Chilliwack, British Columbia, Canada
- Died: September 3, 2019 (aged 68); Vienna, Austria
- Education: PhD University of Illinois at Urbana–Champaign
- Occupation: Musicologist
- Writing career
- Subject: Music
- Notable works: History of Key Characteristics; Die Unsinnsgesellschaft

Rita Katherine Steblin (April 22, 1951 – September 3, 2019) was a musicologist, specializing in archival work combining music history, iconography and genealogical research.

Steblin was born in Chilliwack, British Columbia, Canada; she died in Vienna, Austria. She was the daughter of Sergei and Renata Steblin, a co-founder of Richmond Baptist Church.

After obtaining degrees in Vancouver, Toronto and Urbana, Illinois, and studying at the University of Music and Performing Arts Vienna, Steblin worked in Canada (mainly in Vancouver) and since 1991 in Vienna first at the Internationales Franz-Schubert-Institut and then as an independent researcher on Ludwig van Beethoven, Franz Schubert and social life in late eighteenth and early nineteenth-century in Austria (including Hungary and Bohemia).

== Controversy about Schubert's sexuality ==
In the debate over Franz Schubert's sexuality, she was one of the fiercest critics of musicologist Maynard Solomon, who in 1989 was the first to openly expound the much-discussed theory of Schubert's homosexuality within a scholarly framework. She published numerous articles on the subject and was in turn criticised by Solomon and others for her theories. In 1994 she wrote: "Perhaps we should study what it is about Schubert that makes him so attractive to fashionable political ideologies. Why did the Nazis abuse Schubert to promote their theories of pure Aryan race? […] And why, when the evidence is so questionable, is Schubert being promoted now with such passion as a homosexual composer?" For this, she was again criticised, for example by Charles Rosen.

== Selected bibliography ==
=== On Beethoven ===
- Steblin, Rita (1999), "So wurde nach Ferd. Schubert's Entwurfe Beethovens Grabmahl aufgeführt," in: Wiener Beethoven-Gesellschaft Mitteilungsblatt 30/3–4: pp. 9–16.
- Steblin, Rita (2000): "Hoechle's 1827 Sketch of Beethoven's Studio: A Secret Tribute to Schubert?" Beethoven Forum, vol. 8, pp. 1–23.
- Steblin, Rita (2001): Letter to the Editor on the Immortal Beloved (re: Almerie Esterházy). Beethoven Society Journal, vol. 16/1, pp. 45–48.
- Steblin, Rita (2001): "Beethoven's Immortal Beloved: Evidence against Almerie Esterházy". Abstracts of Papers Read at the Meeting of the American Musicological Society, Sixty-Seventh Annual Meeting, November 15–18, p. 56.
- Steblin, Rita (2002), "Josephine Gräfin Brunswick-Deyms Geheimnis enthüllt: Neue Ergebnisse zu ihrer Beziehung zu Beethoven." (Josephine Countess Brunsvik-Deym's Secret Revealed: New Results about her Relationship to Beethoven.) Österreichische Musikzeitschrift 57/6 (June), pp. 23–31.
- Steblin, Rita (2003): "'Höchle zeichnete mir diesen Leichenzug'. Anton Gräffer, Johann Nepomuk Hoechle und die verschollene Zeichnung von Beethovens Begräbnisfeier." Wiener Geschichtsblätter, vol. 58/4, pp. 299–315.
- Steblin, Rita (2005), "Reminiscences of Beethoven in Anton Gräffer's unpublished memoirs: a legacy of the Viennese biography project of 1827." Bonner Beethoven-Studien 4, pp. 149–189.
- Steblin, Rita (2006): "Who Died? The Funeral March in Beethoven's Eroica Symphony." The Musical Quarterly, vol. 89/1, pp. 62–79.
- Skwara, Dagmar/Steblin, Rita (2007): "Ein Brief Christoph Freiherr von Stackelbergs an Josephine Brunsvik-Deym-Stackelberg." (A Letter by Christoph Baron von Stackelberg to Josephine Brunsvik-Deym-Stackelberg.) Bonner Beethoven-Studien, vol. 6, pp. 181–187.
- Steblin, Rita (2007): "'Auf diese Art mit A geht alles zugrunde'. A New Look at Beethoven's Diary Entry and the 'Immortal Beloved'." Bonner Beethoven-Studien, vol. 6, pp. 147–180.
- Steblin, Rita (2007): "Beethovens Beziehungen zu Wiener Klavierbauern um 1800 im Licht neuer Dokumente der Familie Brunswick," in: Das Wiener Klavier bis 1850, ed. Beatrix Darmstädter, Alfons Huber, Rudolf Hopfner (Tutzing: Hans Schneider), pp. 73–82.
- Steblin, Rita (2009). "'A dear, enchanting girl who loves me and whom I love': New Facts about Beethoven's Beloved Piano Pupil Julie Guicciardi". Bonner Beethoven-Studien. 8: 89–152.
- Steblin, Rita (2009): "Beethovens 'Unsterbliche Geliebte': des Rätsels Lösung." (Beethoven's "Immortal Beloved": the Riddle Solved.) Österreichische Musikzeitschrift 64/2, pp. 4–17.
- Steblin, Rita (2009): "Beethoven's Name in Viennese Conscription Records." Beethoven Journal 24/1, pp. 4–13.
- Steblin, Rita (2010): Letter to the Editor, "Beethoven's beloved." The Musical Times, vol. 151 (Autumn), pp. 2–4.
- Steblin, Rita (2012), "Beethoven Mentions in Documents of the Viennese Tonkünstler-Societät", in: Bonner Beethoven-Studien 10, pp. 139–188.
- Steblin, Rita (2013): Beethoven in the Diaries of Johann Nepomuk Chotek, Bonn: Verlag Beethoven-Haus, Carus. ISBN 978-3-88188-133-3.
- Steblin, Rita (2014): "Who was Beethoven's 'Elise'? A new solution to the mystery." In: The Musical Times 155, pp. 3–39.

=== On portraits and death mask of Beethoven ===
- Steblin, Rita & Samuel Geiser (1991): "The Unknown Portrait of Beethoven as a Thirteen-Year-Old," The Beethoven Newsletter 6: 57, pp. 64–67.
- Steblin, Rita (1992), "The newly discovered Hochenecker portrait of Beethoven (1819), 'das ähnlichste Bildnis Beethovens'", Journal of the American Musicological Society, Vol. 45, no. 3, pp. 468–497.
- Steblin, Rita (1993/1994): "Beethoven's Life Mask of 1812 Reconsidered." Beethoven Newsletter, vol. 8/3 & 9/1, pp. 66–70.
- Steblin, Rita (1996), "Beethovens Lebendmaske in einem Bericht von C. F. Pohl," in: Wiener Beethoven-Gesellschaft Mitteilungsblatt 27/1: pp. 1–4.
- Steblin, Rita (2001): "Ein wenig bekanntes Beethoven-Porträt," in: Wiener Beethoven-Gesellschaft Mitteilungsblatt 32/2: pp. 1–4.
- Steblin, Rita (2007): "Joseph Deym and His Wax Museum: A Transitional Artist Important to Mozart and Beethoven." International Musicological Society Meeting, Zürich.

=== On Schubert ===
- Steblin, Rita (1991): "Neue Gedanken zu Schuberts 'Toten-Maske'." Schubert durch die Brille, vol. 6, pp. 66–70.
- Steblin, Rita (1992), "Ein unbekanntes frühes Schubert-Porträt? Franz Schubert und der Maler Josef Abel." Jahresgabe [...] für die Mitglieder des Internationalen Franz-Schubert-Instituts (IFSI) und der Deutschen Schubert-Gesellschaft e.V., Tutzing. ISBN/ISMN: 3795207436.
- Steblin, Rita (1992): "Franz Schubert und das Ehe-Consens Gesetz von 1815." Schubert durch die Brille, vol. 9, pp. 32–42. In French in: Cahiers F. Schubert 2 (1993), pp. 17–26.
- Steblin, Rita (1992): "Die Atzenbrugger Gäste-Listen – neu entdeckt. Ein wichtiger Beitrag zur Schubert-Ikonographie" Schubert durch die Brille, vol. 9, pp. 65–80.
- Steblin, Rita (1993): "Nochmals die Atzenbrugger Gäste-Listen." Schubert durch die Brille, vol. 10, pp. 35–41.
- Steblin, Rita (1993): "Schwinds Porträtskizze 'Schubert am Klavier'" Schubert durch die Brille, vol. 10, pp. 45–52.
- Steblin, Rita (1993): "Neue Forschungsaspekte zu Caroline Esterházy." Schubert durch die Brille, vol. 11, pp. 21–33.
- Steblin, Rita (1993): "Schubert und der Maler Josef Teltscher." Schubert durch die Brille, vol. 11, pp. 118–132.
- Steblin, Rita (1993), "The Peacock's Tale: Schubert's Sexuality Reconsidered." 19th-Century Music. – Berkeley, California: University of California Press, ISSN 0148-2076, ZDB-ID 4395712, T 17., 1, pp. 5–33.
- Steblin, Rita (1994): "Le mariage malheureux de Caroline Esterházy. Une histoire authentique, telle que'elle est retracée dans les lettres de la famille Crenneville." Cahiers F. Schubert, vol. 5, pp. 17–34.
- Steblin, Rita (1994): "Unbekannte Dokumente über Schubert und die Klavierwerkstatt von Conrad Graf in Währing." Schubert durch die Brille, vol. 12, pp. 49–53.
- Steblin, Rita (1994): "Friedrich Lieders Schubert-Porträt von 1827." Schubert durch die Brille, vol. 12, pp. 92–100.
- Steblin, Rita (1996), Babette und Therese Kunz: neue Forschungen zum Freundeskreis um Franz Schubert und Leopold Kupelwieser, Wien: Vom Pasqualatihaus. ISBN/ISMN: 3901254161.
- Steblin, Rita (1997), "Schubert's 'Nina' and the True Peacocks." The Musical Times 138, pp. 13–19.
- Steblin, Rita (1997): "Schubert durch das Kaleidoskop" (English version: "Schubert Through the Kaleidoscope"). Österreichische Musikzeitschrift, vol. 52/1–2 (Schubert Special 1997), pp. 52–61.
- Steblin, Rita (1998). "Schubert's Relationship with Women: An Historical Account". In Newbould, Brian (ed.). Schubert Studies. Ashgate. pp. 159–182. ISBN 978-1-85928-253-3.
- Steblin, Rita (1998), "Schubert and the Pfarre Rossau." Studien zur Musikwissenschaft, Vol. 46, pp. 153–173.
- Steblin, Rita (1998). Die Unsinnsgesellschaft: Franz Schubert, Leopold Kupelwieser und ihr Freundeskreis. Böhlau. ISBN 3-205-98820-5.
  - Branscombe, Peter (2000), "Review Rita Steblin Die Unsinnsgesellschaft. Franz Schubert, Leopold Kupelwieser und ihr Freundeskreis", Modern Language Review, Vol. 95/4 (October 2000), pp. 1127–1128.
  - Feuerzeig, Lisa (2000), "Review Rita Steblin Die Unsinnsgesellschaft. Franz Schubert, Leopold Kupelwieser und ihr Freundeskreis", MLA Notes 57/2 (December 2000), pp. 391–393.
  - Reul, Barbara (2001), "Review Rita Steblin Die Unsinnsgesellschaft. Franz Schubert, Leopold Kupelwieser und ihr Freundeskreis", Die Musikforschung 54, H. 2 (April – June 2001), pp. 197–198
- Steblin, Rita (1998). "In Defense of Scholarship and Archival Research: Why Schubert's Brothers Were Allowed to Marry". Current Musicology. 62: 7–17.
- Steblin, Rita (1999): "Schubert's Role in the Unsinnsgesellschaft as Revealed by Clues from Schiller and Aschenschlägel," in: Eva Badura-Skoda et al. (ed.): Franz Schubert und seine Freunde, Vienna: Böhlau, pp. 238–245.
- Steblin, Rita (1999): Letter to the Editor. "Antwort an M. Solomon von Rita Steblin." Österreichische Musikzeitschrift, vol. 54/9, pp. 70–71.
- Steblin, Rita (1999), "Schubert's Elise. Das Dörfchen and the 'Unsinnsgesellschaft'." The Musical Times 140, pp. 33–43.
- Steblin, Rita (2001), "Schubert's Problematic Relationship with Johann Mayrhofer: New Documentary Evidence", in: Barbara Haggh (ed.): Essays on Music and Culture in Honor of Herbert Kellman, pp. 465–495.
- Steblin, Rita (2001), "Franz Schubert – das dreizehnte Kind." Wiener Geschichtsblätter, 3, pp. 245–265.
- Steblin, Rita (2002), "The Schober family's 'tiefe sittliche Verdorbenheit' as revealed in spy reports from 1810 about Ludovica and her mother." Schubert durch die Brille 29. Hans Schneider, Tutzing, pp. 39–65.
- Steblin, Rita (2002), "Unknown Documents about Kremsmünster Students in the Schubert Circle." Schubert: Perspektiven 2, pp. 57–116.
- Steblin, Rita (2002): "Schubert's Beloved Singer Therese Grob: New Documentary Research." Schubert durch die Brille, vol. 28, pp. 55–100.
- Steblin, Rita (2003), "Schubert's Hidden Past as Caricatured by the Unsinngesellschaft: the Painter Carl Zimmermann and the Jewish Connection/" The Past in the Present Vol. 1, pp .263–286.
- Steblin, Rita; Stocken, Frederick (2007), "Studying with Sechter: newly Recovered Reminiscences about Schubert by his Forgotten Friend, the Composer Joseph Lanz." Music & Letters, Oxford: University Press, ISSN 0027-4224, vol. 88, pp. 226–265.
- Steblin, Rita (2007): "Schuberts Cousine Lenchen: Magdalena Sandler und ihre Familie." Wiener Geschichtsblätter, vol. 62/4, pp. 30–47.
- Steblin, Rita (2008): "The Child Schubert in Conrad Graf's Piano Workshop in Währing." The Schubertian, vol. 59, pp. 6–14.
- Steblin, Rita (2008), "Schober's Love Affair with Marie von Spaun and the Role Played by Helene Schmith, the Wife of Mozart's First Violinist." Schubert: Perspektiven 8, pp. 48–86.
- Steblin, Rita (2008), "Schubert's Pepi: His Love Affair with the Chambermaid Josepha Pöcklhofer and Her Surprising Fate." The Musical Times, pp. 47–69.
- Steblin, Rita (2009): "The Repertoire of the Hofmusikkapelle (1808–1812) as Cited in Johann Nepomuk Chotek's Diary." Schubert: Perspektiven, vol. 9/1, pp. 90–107.
- Steblin, Rita (2010): "Who Commissioned Schubert's Oratorio Lazarus? A Solution to the Mystery. Salieri and the Tonkünstler-Societät." Schubert:Perspektiven. 9, 2010, pp. 145–181.
- Steblin, Rita (2010): "Michael Holzer, Schubert's Music Teacher in Lichtental: A New Genealogical Study", in: Schubert: Perspektiven, vol. 10/1, pp. 10–44.
- Steblin, Rita (2010): "New Thoughts on Schubert's Role in the Unsinnsgesellschaft." in: Schubert: Perspektiven, vol. 10/2, pp. 191–223.
- Steblin, Rita (2011): "Der Komponist Joseph Lanz (1797–1873): Ein vergessener Freund Franz Schuberts aus Oberösterreich." in: Streifzüge II. Beiträge zur oberösterreichischen Musikgeschichte, ed. Klaus Petermayr and Erich Wolfgang Partsch (Linz: OÖ Volksliedwerk), pp. 77–107.

=== On Mozart ===
- Steblin, Rita (1991): "Eine Violine aus dem Besitz von Leopold Mozart?" Gerhard Stradner (ed.): Die Klangwelt Mozarts. Vienna: Kunsthistorisches Museum, pp. 32–37, 194–195.
- Steblin, Rita (2009): "A Problem Solved: The Identity of Georg Friedrich Richter, Virtuoso 'Claviermeister' from Holland, Mozart's Friend and Partner in the Trattnerhof Subscription Concerts of 1784." Newsletter of the Mozart Society of America, vol. 13/2, pp. 5–9.

=== On Handel ===
- Steblin, Rita (1984), "Did Handel Meet Bononcini in Rome?" The Music Review 45, pp. 179–193.

=== On Haydn ===
- Steblin, Rita (1986), "Key Characteristics and Haydn's Operas." Internationaler Joseph Haydn Kongress Wien 1982, ed. Eva Badura-Skoda, Munich: Henle, pp. 91–100.
- Steblin, Rita (2000): "Haydn's Orgeldienst in der damaligen Gräfl. Haugwitzischen Kapelle." Wiener Geschichtsblätter, vol. 55/2, pp. 124–134.

=== On Weber ===
- Steblin, Rita (2009), "Weber-Notizen eines Prager Adligen: Johann Nepomuk von Choteks Tagebücher 1813–1823 in Bezug auf Carl Maria von Weber." Weberiana, vol. 19.

=== On Paganini ===
- Steblin, Rita (2005): "Anton Gräffer's Reminiscences of Paganini's 1828 Concert Tour in Vienna: An Inside View of the First Rehearsal and the Break with Antonia Bianchi." Ad Parnassu (Bologna: Ut Orpheus Edizioni) vol. 3/6, pp. 1–24.

=== On Johann Strauß ===
- Steblin, Rita (2010): "Neue Fakten zu Johann Strauß und Joseph Lanner: Die Frauen-Freundschaft zwischen Magdalena Schubert, Therese Grob und Anna Streim." Wiener Geschichtsblätter, vol. 65/4, pp. 265–279.

=== On other subjects ===
- Steblin, Rita (1983), A History of Key Characteristics in the Eighteenth and Early Nineteenth Centuries. Ann Arbor: UMI Research Press, ISBN 0-8357-1418-7. Second edition: Rochester University Press 2002. ISBN 1-58046-041-0.
  - Arnn, John (1983), "Review Rita Steblin: A History of Key Characteristics in the Eighteenth and Early Nineteenth Centuries", MLA Notes, pp. 287–289.
  - Ambrose, Jane (1984), "Review Rita Steblin: A History of Key Characteristics in the Eighteenth and Early Nineteenth Centuries", The American Recorder, pp. 147–148.
  - Berger, Karol (1984), "Review Rita Steblin: A History of Key Characteristics in the Eighteenth and Early Nineteenth Centuries", Music & Letters 66, pp. 388–391.
- Steblin, Rita (1987), "Towards a History of Absolute Pitch Recognition." College Music Symposium 27, pp. 141–153.
- Steblin, Rita (1990), "Death as a Fiddler: the Study of a Convention in European Art, Literature and Music." Basler Jahrbuch für historische Musikpraxis. Vol. 14, pp. 271–322.
- Steblin, Rita (1992): "Healey Willan's Inscribed Copy of John Coulter's Deirdre of the Sorrows." Canadian University Music Review, vol. 12, pp. 113–122.
- Steblin, Rita (1995): "The Gender Stereotyping of Musical Instruments in the Western Tradition." Canadian University Music Review. Voices of Women: Essays in Honour of Violet Archer, vol. 16/1, pp. 128–144.
- Steblin, Rita (2007), "Anton Walter's Difficult Early Years in Vienna: New Documents, 1772–1779." Journal of the American Musical Instrument Society, vol. 33, pp. 41–75.
- Steblin, Rita (2008), "Viennese Woodwind Makers in the Classical Era, with Emphasis on Friedrich Lempp's Request for Protection in 1768." Journal of the American Musical Instrument Society, vol. 34, pp. 26–73.
- Steblin, Rita (2009): "Early Viennese Fortepiano Production: Anton Walter and New Inventions by Johann Georg Volkert in 1777–1783." Studien zur Musikwissenschaft, vol. 55, pp. 269–302.
- Steblin, Rita (2012): "Paul Wranitzky (1756–1808): New Biographical Facts from Vienna's Archives." Mozart Studien, vol. 21, pp. 369–395.
- Steblin, Rita (2013): "Mälzel's Early Career to 1813. New Archival Research in Regensburg and Vienna." in: colloquium collegarum. Festschrift für David Hiley zum 65. Geburtstag (= Regensburger Studien zur Musikgeschichte, vol. 10), ed. Wolfgang Horn and Fabian Weber (Tutzing: Hans Schneider), pp. 161–210.
