= Unsinnsgesellschaft =

19th century Viennese society

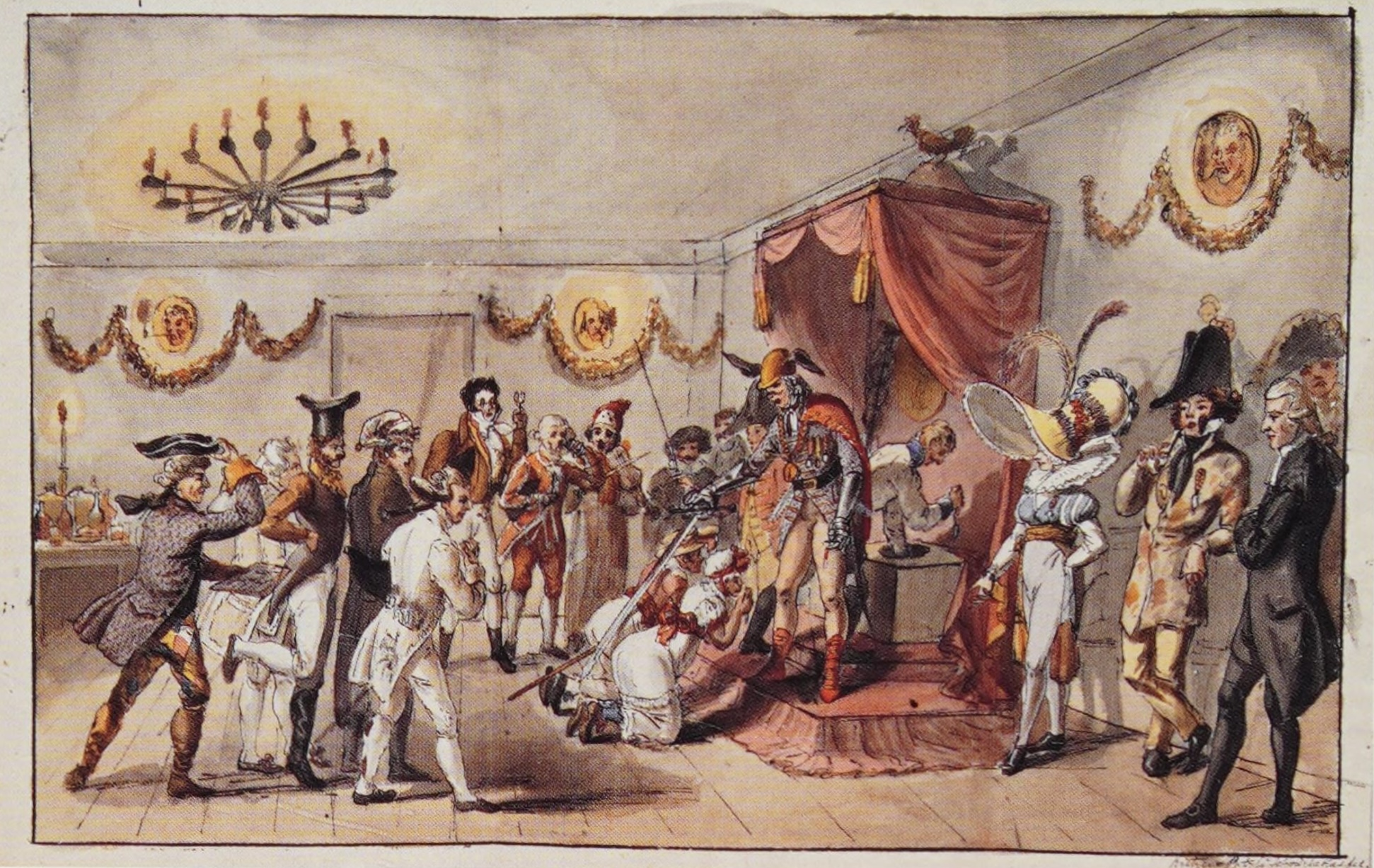
Zur Unsinniade 4. Gesang. Watercolour by Ernst Welker (31 December 1817)

The Unsinnsgesellschaft (Nonsense Society) was a brotherhood of artists in Vienna that met regularly from April 1817 to the end of 1818. Its members included important artists of the Biedermeier period such as August von Kloeber, Johann Nepomuk Hoechle, August Kopisch, Josef and Leopold Kupelwieser, and Franz Schubert.

All 25-30 members but one, the proprietress of the inn where they met, were men. Although two took women's names within the club, of which still-life painter Johann Carl Smirsch was known for dressing in women's clothing and wearing peacock feathers.

== Activities of the Unsinnsgesellschaft ==
The members met once a week, on Thursdays, in the inn "Zum rothen Hahn" at Landstraßer Hauptstraße 40 in Vienna.

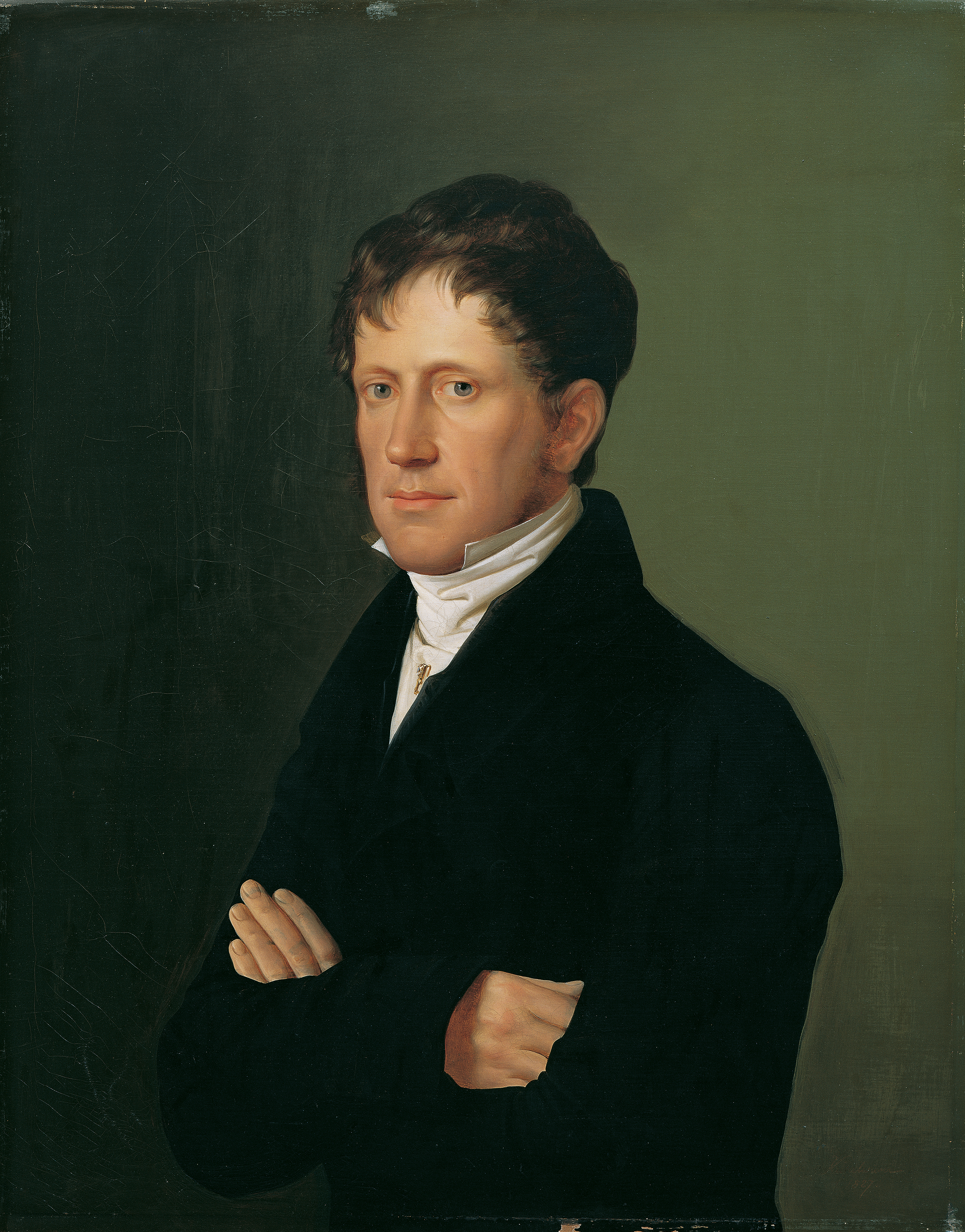
Leopold Kupelwieser

=== Archiv des menschlichen Unsinns ===
The handwritten, weekly club magazine Archiv des menschlichen Unsinns - ein langweiliges Unterhaltungsblatt für Wahnwitzige (Archive of Human Nonsense - a boring entertainment magazine for the insane) contained various texts, essays, short plays and illustrations (such as watercolours). Because many members were talented painters, the resulting pictures are an important part of the overall artistic production. Among other things, they also travesty the academic painting of the time. The illustrations of two elaborately designed parties provide insight into the exuberant young artistic community. 29 booklets (out of 86) have been preserved.

The texts contain numerous allusions to current affairs, political events, parodies of classics as well as a comic epyllion in elegiac distichs (Die Unsinniade by Joseph Kupelwieser). By means of partly crude jokes, ambiguous puns and metaphors, but also comedies, sarcastic texts and absurdist plays, they mock the private affairs of the association, and topics such as current events, new discoveries, art, literature and everyday life.

==== Size, layout and sections ====
The booklets - all in the same format with a picture - were passed around the circle. They each start with a witty motto, such as:

Take up the brushes, let's wax [or wank] bravely!

— Spitznabels Nudelino, 2. Jahrgang, Booklet Nr. 20, 28 Mai 1818,

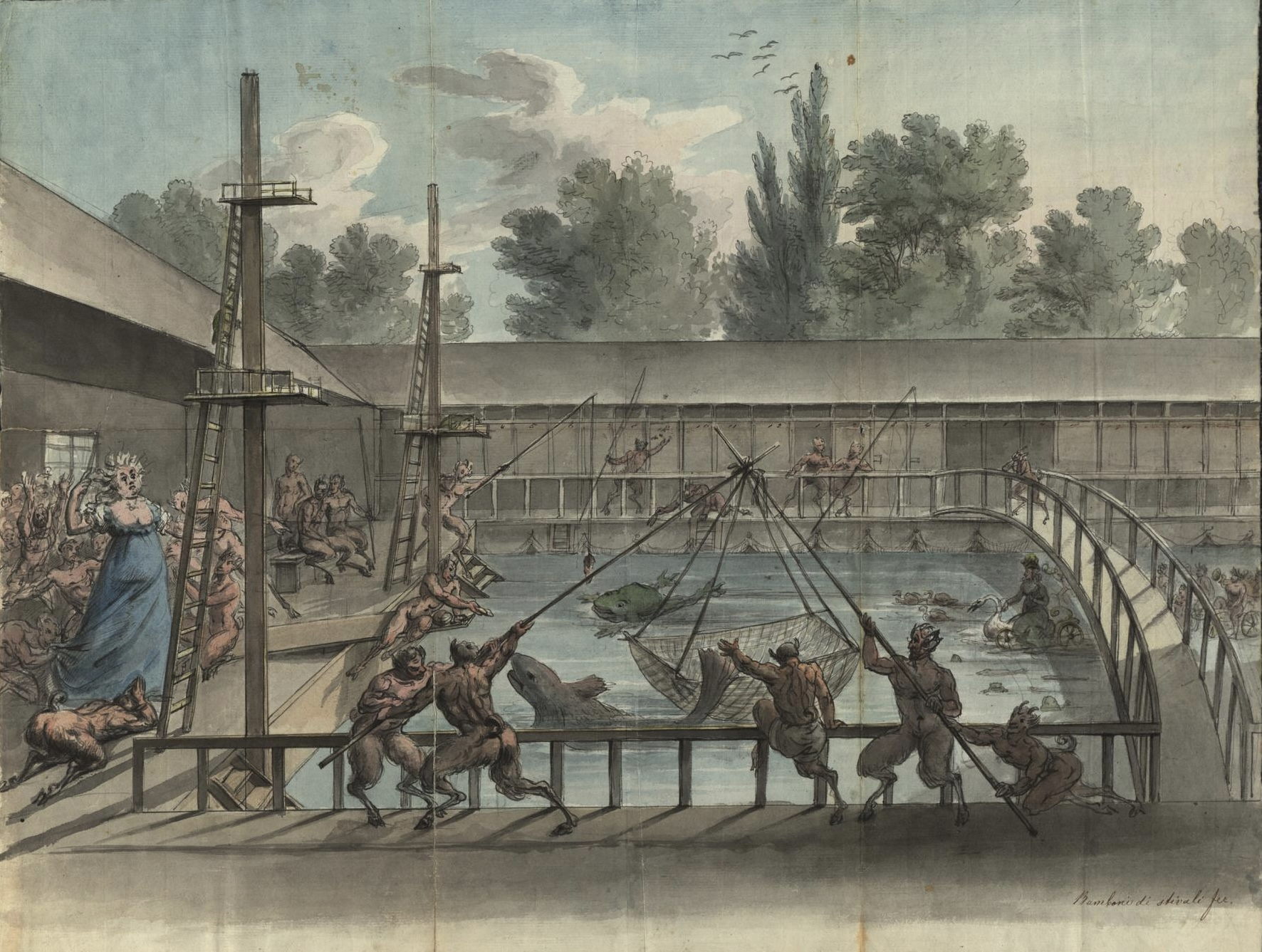
Illustration of Fang des Fisches und des Frosches (Part zwo of Musas Fluch und die Verwandlung der Jünglinge). Watercolour by Tobias Raulino (12 February 1818).

All booklets are divided into sections:

- Politica or Politisches Allerlei
- Schöne Literatur: Short stories (f.e. Die Fee Musa oder die verwandelten Jünglinge), short plays (Barbarey ohne Größe oder Mord, Brand, Blut, Dolch und Frevel), poems
- Wissenschaftliche Gegenstände (Naturgeschichte des Bockes, Abhandlung über die Brüche)
- Avertissements (in the first year) or Intelligenzblatt (in the second year): Information, Classifieds, Advertisements
- Zum Kupfer: Description of the illustration (one watercolour or pen and ink drawing each)

=== Unsinniaden ===
Two big parties, so-called Unsinniaden, were planned in the first year and celebrated in private homes: New Year's Eve 1817 was celebrated at Peter Senft's ("Ephraim Spitznabel") and the first foundation anniversary party of the association on 18 April 1818 at Gottfried Beyer's ("the new quartermaster"). Both lived in the house of Café Wallner at Landstraßer Hauptstraße 32.

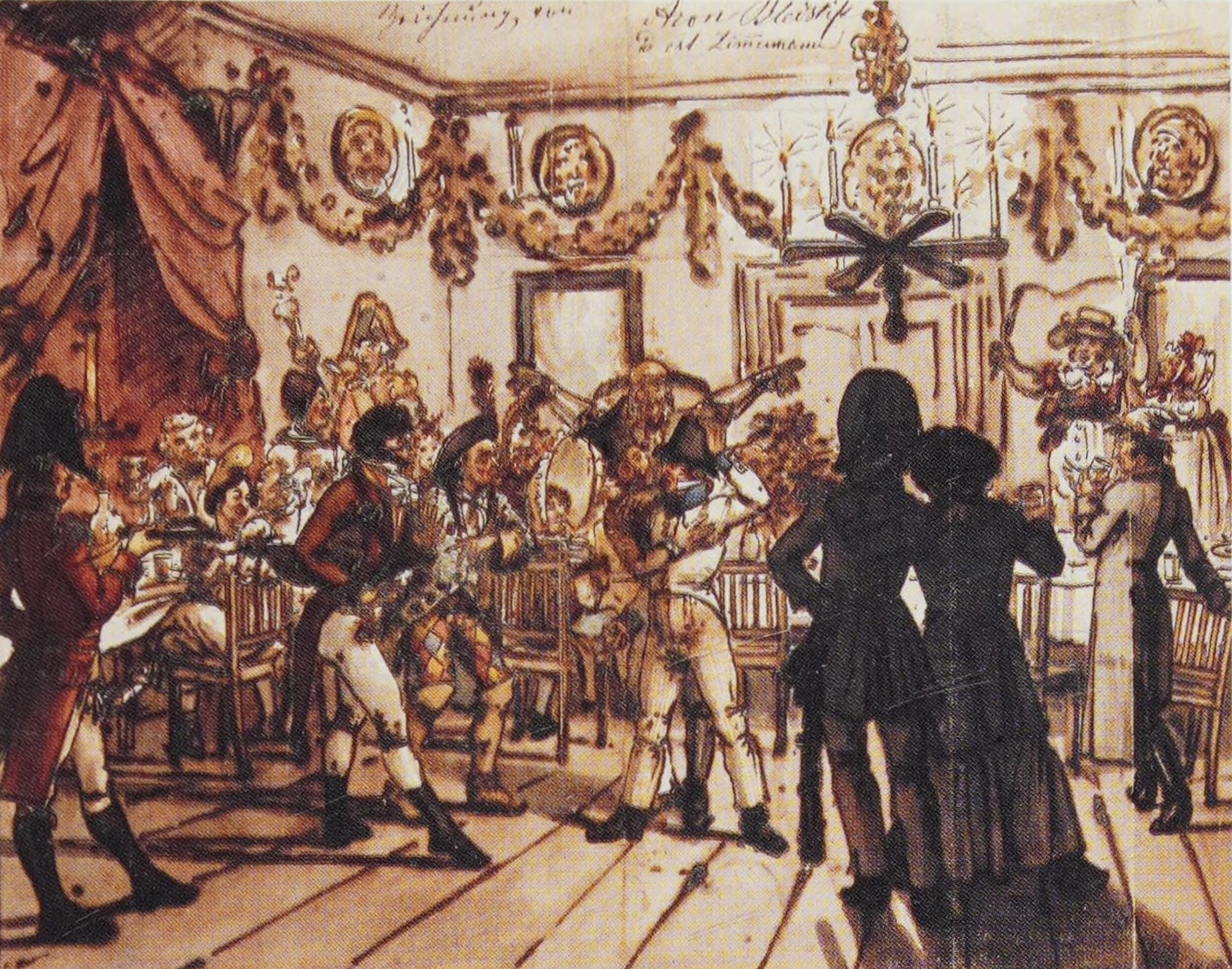
Zur Unsinniade 1. Gesang. Watercolour by Carl Friedrich Zimmermann (31 December 1817)-

The festivities, or already the preparations for them, were announced in the booklets. In order to depict these "thrusting" days - as it is formulated in the description of the first feast - for posterity, the members produced the illustrated feast acts, which are now kept in the Historical Museum in Vienna. A third (smaller) celebration was the name day of the "Generalquartiermeisterin" (Therese Fellner) on Theresientag (15 October) 1818. On this occasion a poem, a drama, a picture and several smaller contributions - almost the entire booklet - were dedicated to her. On 3 December 1818, plans were already being made for the next upcoming New Year's Eve celebration. Because the last issues are lost, it is not known whether this actually took place.

== Members ==
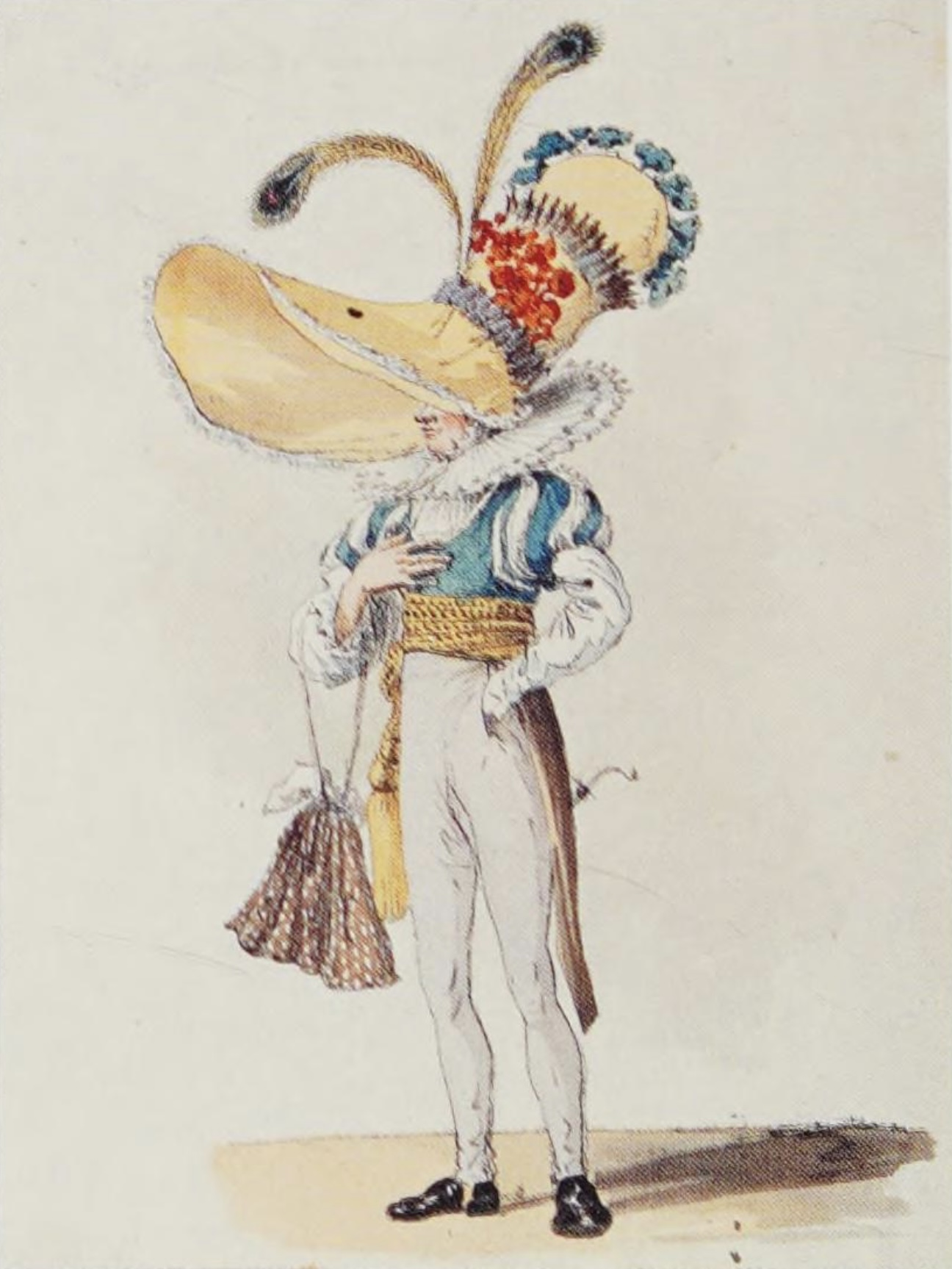
Johann Carl Smirsch alias Nina Wutzerl.

The members of the Nonsense Society had aliases within their circle. These are broken down with the plain names in the first issue of the society's journal Archiv des menschlichen Unsinns (17 April 1817):

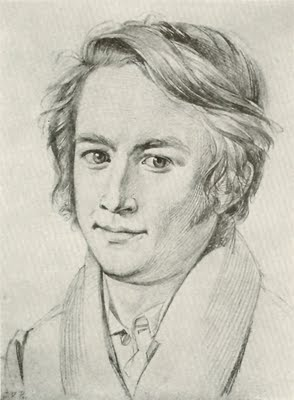
August Kopisch

- Eduard Anschütz: „Schnautze Redacteur“
- Gustav Anschütz: „Sebastian Haarpuder"
- Ferdinand Dörflinger: „Elise von Antifi, geb. Gagarnadl“
- Carl Peter Goebel: „Rafaele van der Riso di Zaardam“
- Franz Goldhann: „Ultimus“
- Johann Nepomuk Höchle: „Kratzeratti Klanwinzi“
- Johann Georg Kettel: „Primo Amoroso“
- August von Kloeber: „Goliath Pinselstiel“
- August Kopisch: „Galimathias Hirngespinst“
- Ludwig Kraißl: „Pinselmo Schmieraliri“
- Josef Kupelwieser: „Blasius Leks“
- Johann Kupelwieser: „Chrisostomus Schmecks“
- Leopold Kupelwieser: „Damian Klex“
- Tobias Dionys Raulino: „Bubone di Stivali“
- Johann Peter Senft: „Ephraim Spitznabel“
- Johann Carl Smirsch: „Nina Wutzerl“
- Franz Swoboda: „Thadäus Baron von Buh“
- Julius Swoboda: „Crispinus Baron von Buh“
- Ernst Welker: „Kritzli Batzli“
- Georg Wiedermann: „Semprestà“
- Carl Friedrich Zimmermann: „Aaron Bleistift“, auch „Inkoff“
- Franz Seraphicus Zöpfl: „Zeisig, Vice Redacteur, Serafino Pittura“
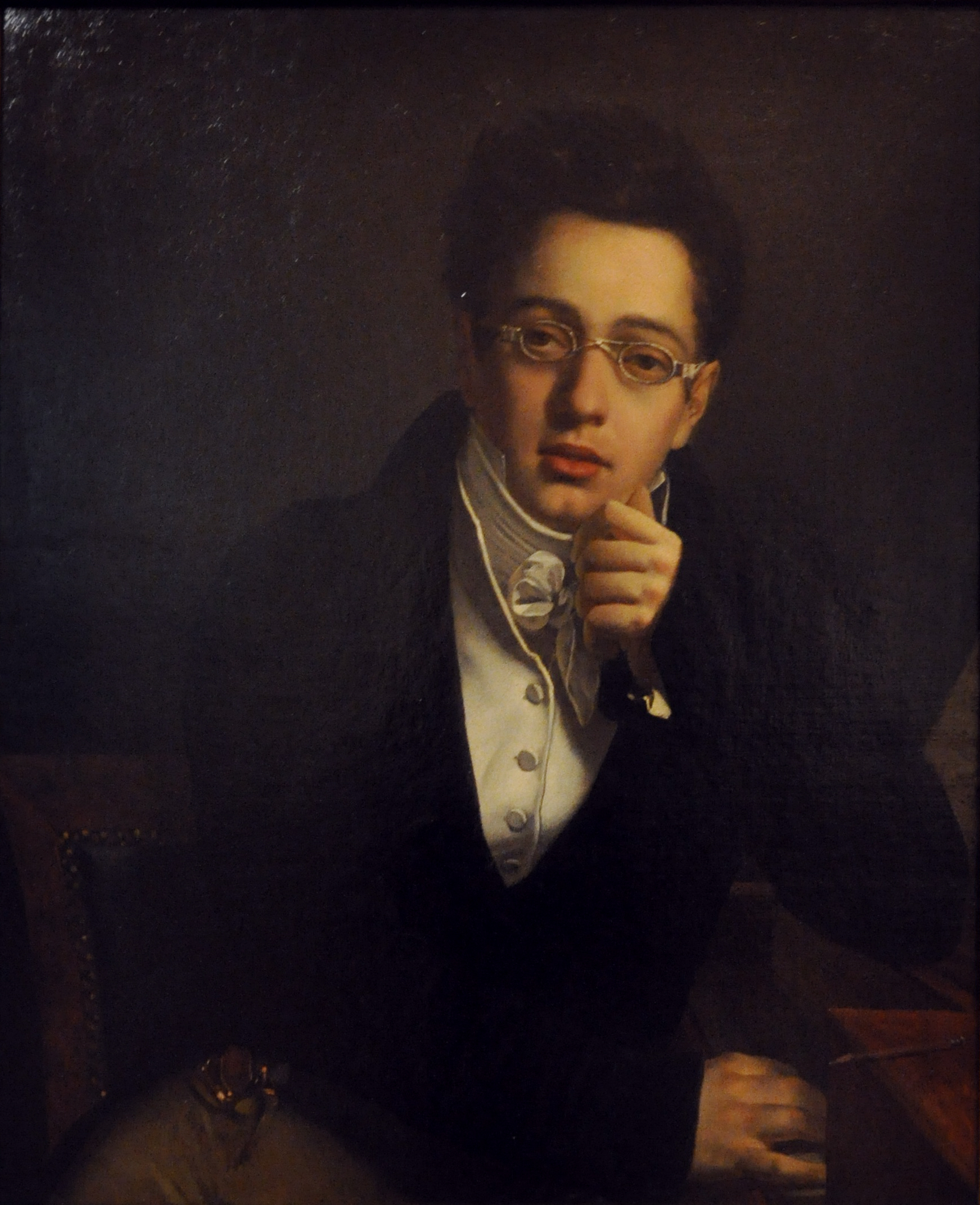
  Possible portrait of the young Franz Schubert c. 1814, attributed to Josef Abel

According to Heinrich Anschütz, Franz Schubert was also one of the members of this nonsense society:

Franz Schubert was one of the most active members of the former merry nonsenses society. My brothers had been socialising with him there for years in the most intimate way and through my siblings he also came to my house.

— Heinrich Anschütz, Erinnerung aus dessen Leben und Wirken - Nach eigenhändigen Aufzeichnungen und mündlichen Mitteilungen,

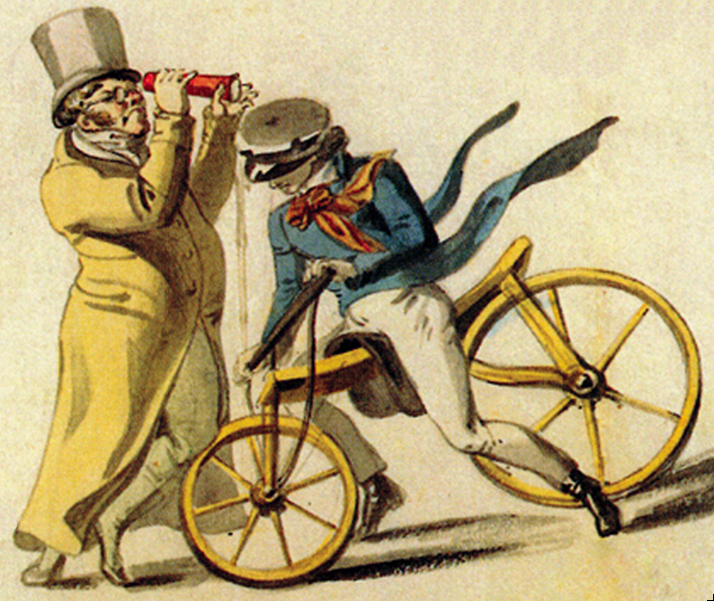
Das Kaleidoskop und die Draisine, Leopold Kupelwieser’s Caricature of himself and Schubert (16 July 1818).

== Literature ==
- Eduard Anschütz (Hrsg.): Archiv des menschlichen Unsinns: Ein langweiliges Unterhaltungsblatt für Wahnwitzige (1817). 9 booklets, digital copy at Wienbibliothek im Rathaus.
- Eduard Anschütz (Hrsg.): Archiv des menschlichen Unsinns: Ein langweiliges Unterhaltungsblatt für Wahnwitzige (1818). 20 booklets, digital copy at Wienbibliothek im Rathaus.
- Rita Steblin: Die Unsinnsgesellschaft: Franz Schubert, Leopold Kupelwieser und ihr Freundeskreis. Wien: Böhlau (1998). ISBN 978-3-205-98820-5.
- Ilija Dürhammer: Schuberts literarische Heimat: Dichtung und Literaturrezeption der Schubert-Freunde, Böhlau-Verlag, Wien/Köln/Weimar 1999, ISBN 978-3-205-99051-2
