= Rudolfov =

- Town
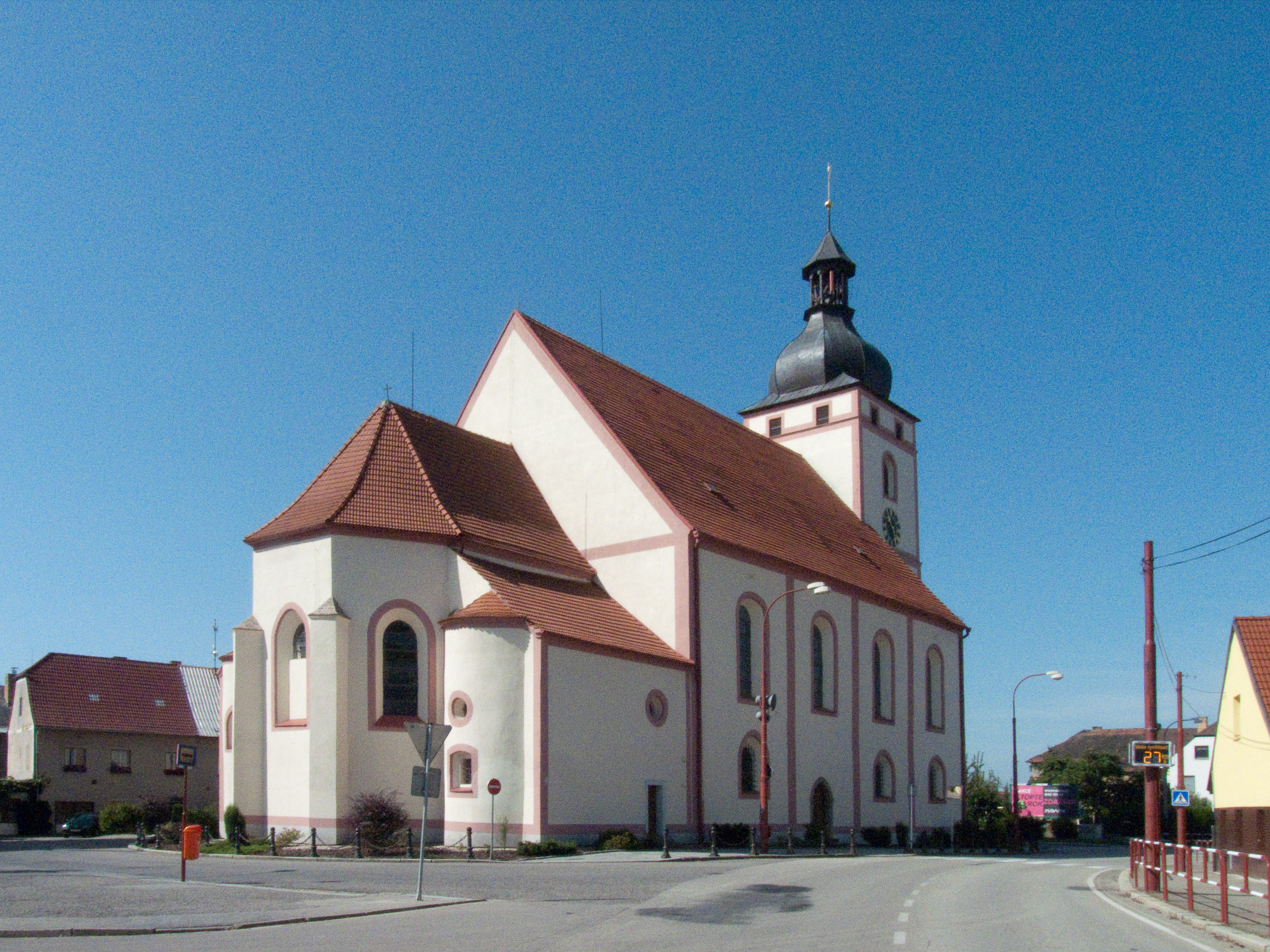
- Church of Saint Vitus

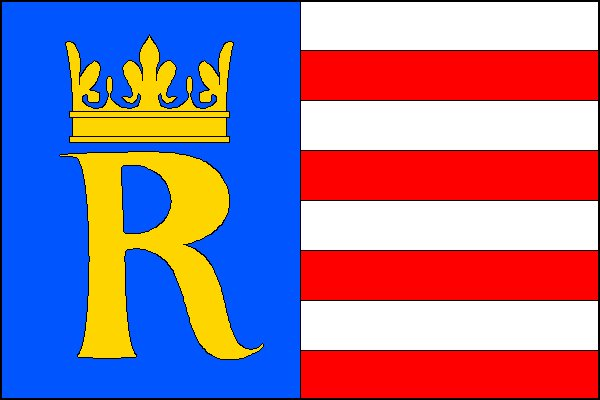
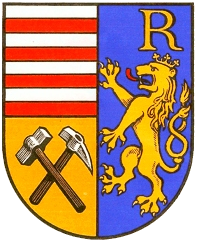
- Flag Coat of arms

- Location in the Czech Republic
- Coordinates: 48°59′36″N 14°32′30″E
- Country: Czech Republic
- Region: South Bohemian
- District: České Budějovice
- First mentioned: 1570

Government
  - Mayor: Vít Kavalír

Area
  - Total: 3.19 km^{2} (1.23 sq mi)
- Elevation: 480 m (1,570 ft)

Population (2026-01-01)
  - Total: 2,617
  - Density: 820/km^{2} (2,120/sq mi)
- Time zone: UTC+1 (CET)
  - Summer (DST): UTC+2 (CEST)
- Postal code: 373 71
- Website: www.mestorudolfov.cz

Rudolfov (Czech pronunciation: [ˈrudolfof]; German: Rudolfstadt) is a town in České Budějovice District in the South Bohemian Region of the Czech Republic. It has about 2,600 inhabitants. The town is located in the Třeboň Basin.

== Administrative division ==
Rudolfov consists of two municipal parts (in brackets population according to the 2021 census):

- Rudolfov (2,301)
- Hlinsko (188)

Hlinsko forms an exclave of the municipal territory.

== Etymology ==
The name is derived from the personal name Rudolf, meaning "Rudolf's (town)".

== Geography ==
Rudolfov is located about 4 kilometres (2 mi) east of České Budějovice. It lies in the Třeboň Basin. The highest point is at 555 m (1,821 ft) above sea level. The Čertík Stream flows through the town and supplies there a system of several fishponds.

== History ==
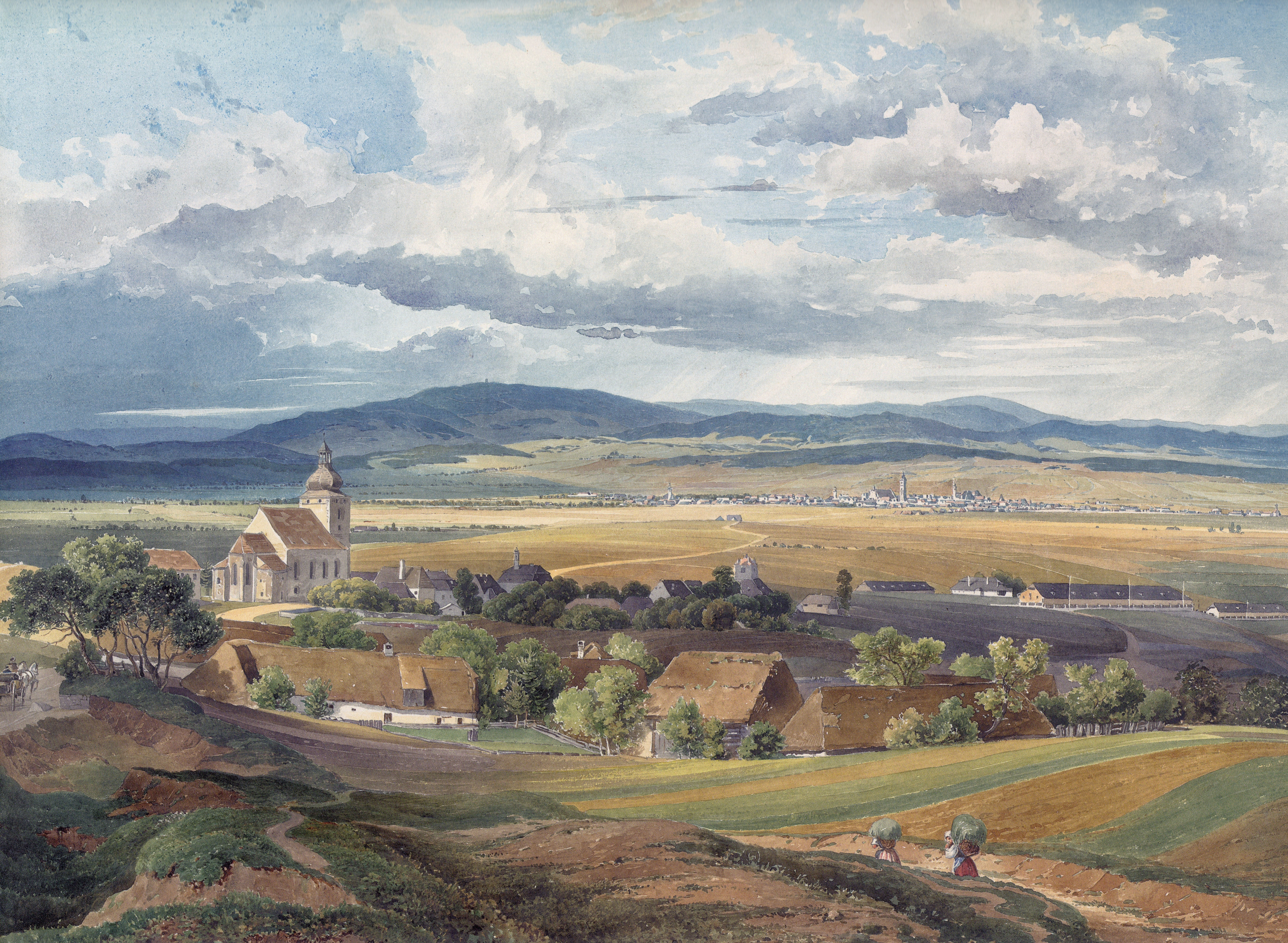
Rudolfov in 1840 in a painting by Eduard Gurk

The first mention of silver mining in the area is from 1385. The first written mention of Rudolfov is from 1570. In the late 16th century, mining had become intense, and it was the most important silver mining area in Bohemia alongside Kutná Hora and Jáchymov. In 1585, the mining settlement was promoted to a royal mining town by Emperor Rudolf II.

As early as the end of the 16th century, there was a decline in mining due to problems with the drainage of flooded mines. In 1619, during the Bohemian Revolt, the town was looted. The destroyed town became a property of the city of České Budějovice in 1620. In 1623, Rudolfov was resettled. From 1656, it was referred to as a village. From 1720, it was a town again.

== Demographics ==
Historical population

Year	Pop.	±%
1869	1,320	—
1880	1,403	+6.3%
1890	1,591	+13.4%
1900	1,623	+2.0%
1910	1,940	+19.5%

Year	Pop.	±%
1921	2,096	+8.0%
1930	1,979	−5.6%
1950	1,926	−2.7%
1961	1,741	−9.6%
1970	1,877	+7.8%

Year	Pop.	±%
1980	2,142	+14.1%
1991	2,303	+7.5%
2001	2,390	+3.8%
2011	2,418	+1.2%
2021	2,489	+2.9%

Source: Censuses

== Transport ==
There are no railways or major roads passing through the municipality.

== Sights ==
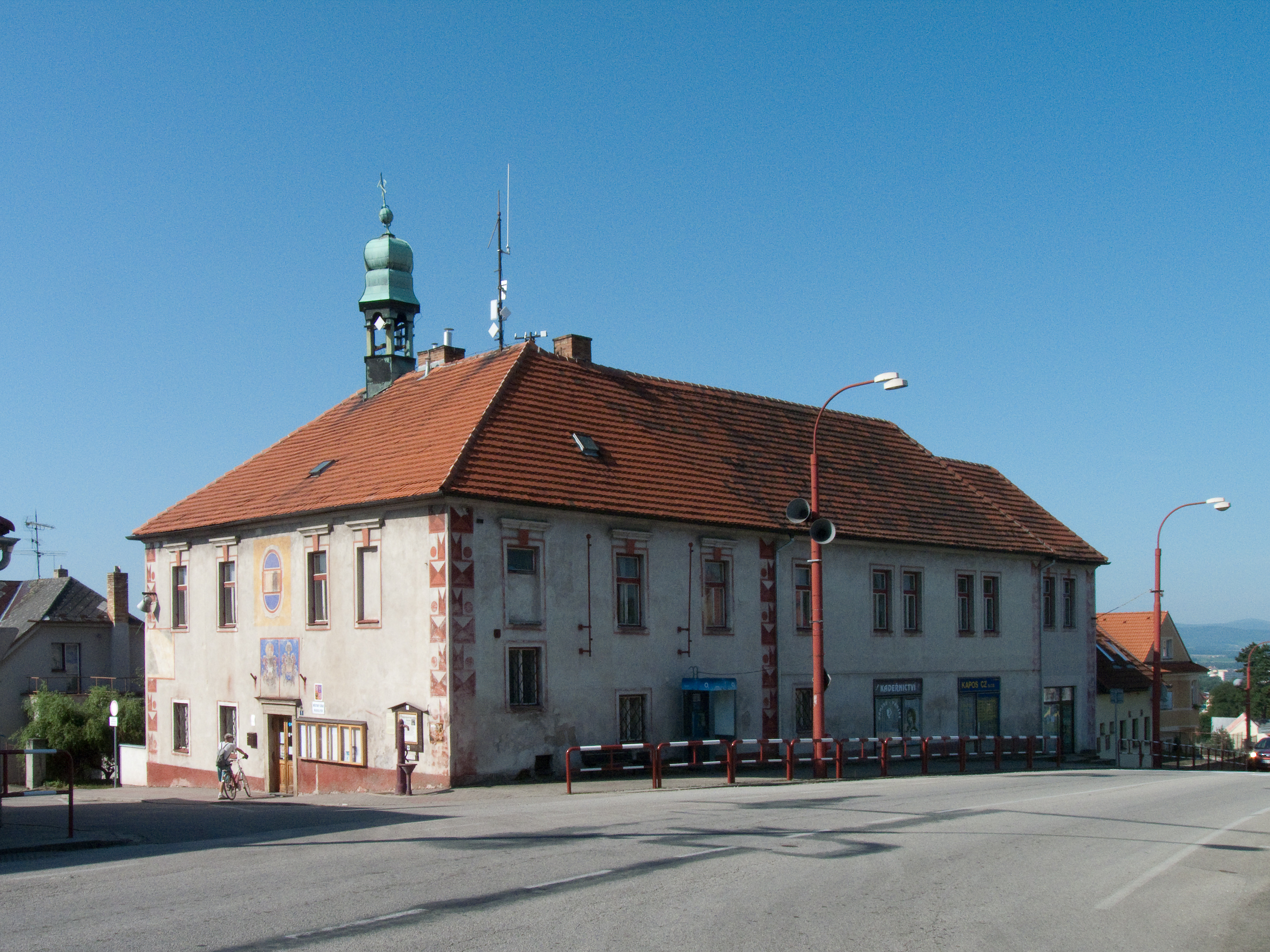
Former town hall, now a museum

The main landmark is the Church of Saint Vitus. It was built as a Protestant temple in 1583. The second landmark is the building of the former mining office and until 2009 the town hall, with Renaissance decorations and a turret. Today it houses a small mining museum.

A monument is also a small Renaissance castle. Today the premises are used as offices.

== Twin towns – sister cities ==
Rudolfov is twinned with:

- Sandl, Austria
