= Josef Blauhorn =

Josef Blauhorn (19 June 1883 Vienna – 1944 London) was an Austrian Jewish lawyer and refugee from the Nazis.

== Career ==
Trained as a lawyer, Blauhorn was employed by the Vienna bank of the Gutmann Brother from 1916 to 1939, when he escaped Austria after the Anschluss with Nazi Germany. He was managing director of Gebrüder Gutmann and a partner in Rothschild as well as a board member of Hanf-, Jute- und Textil-Industrie AG and of the supervisory board of Österreichische Waffenfabriks-Gesellschaft and a partner in the Vienna trading company M. G. Pinter & Co.

He married Auguste "Gusti" Koppel (1886–1961) with whom he had three children: Karl Max, Anna Lisbeth and Hans Georg. The family lived in Vienna's 3rd district.

== Art collection ==
Blauhorn's art collection consisted of about 200 works, mostly by Austrian nineteenth- and twentieth-century artists.

== Nazi era ==
When the Nazis came to power in 1933, the Blauhorns were persecuted because of their Jewish heritage. The paintings were confiscated by the Gestapo and handed over to the Chief Finance President in Vienna "for safekeeping". In 1941 the Vienna Gestapo seized his assets and initiated denaturalization proceedings for the Blauhorn family.

Josef Blauhorn died in early 1944 in exile in London.

== Claims and restitutions ==
In 1945, Blauhorn's widow married jurist Rudolf Franz Bienenfeld, who had also fled to London. With her surviving sons, Karl and Georg (their daughter Anna Lisbeth had died in 1937), she applied unsuccessfully for restitution of the artworks in October 1948. The villa was however returned.

In 2012, the Belvedere Museum in Vienna restituted two paintings, "The Magi" by Leopold Kupelwieser and "The Valley of Chamonix" by Ludwig Ferdinand Schnorr von Carolsfeld.

Most of Blauhorn's collection is still missing.
