= Joseph Kupelwieser =

Austrian librettist (1791–1866)

- Born: 14 January 1791; Vienna, Habsburg monarchy
- Died: 2 February 1866 (aged 75); Rudolfsheim, Austrian Empire
- Occupations: Playwright, librettist, dramaturge
- Organizations: Vienna Court Opera; Theater in der Josefstadt

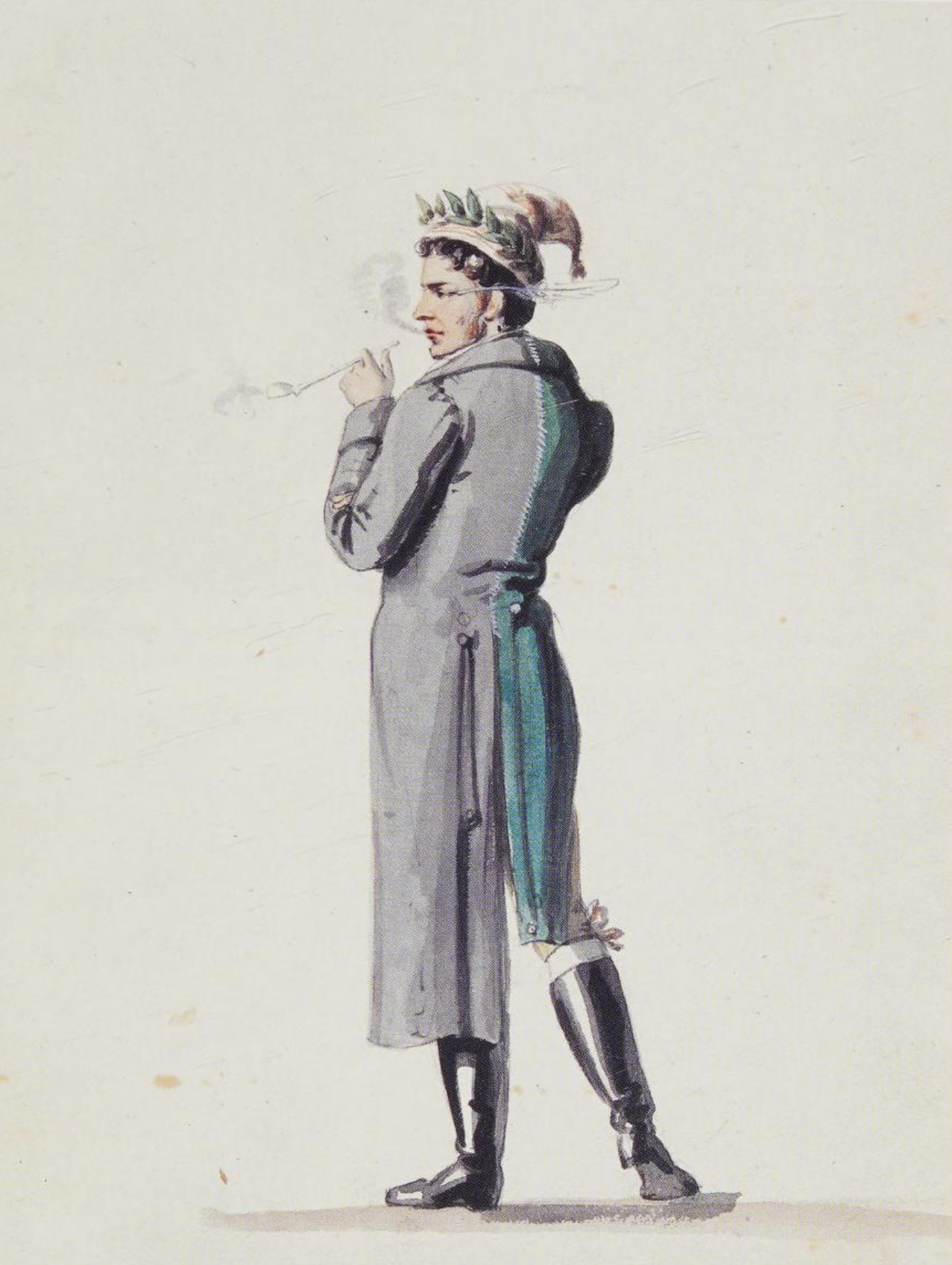
Joseph Kupelwieser alias Blasius Lecks. Drawing by Leopold Kupelwieser (1817).

Joseph Kupelwieser (14 January 1791 – 2 February 1866) was an Austrian playwright, librettist, dramaturge and theatre director. Working at Vienna theatres for decades, he wrote the libretto for Franz Schubert's opera Fierrabras.

== Biography ==
Kupelwieser was born in Vienna, the son of Johann Kupelwieser (1760–1813), a tinware manufacturer with factories in Markt Piesting, Guntramsdorf and Vienna. From 1801 to 1802, Joseph attended the Akademisches Gymnasium and the Erziehungsinstitut (a boarding school) operated by Gaetano Giannatasio del Rio (1764–1828). He also studied briefly at the K.k. Akademie für Orientalische Sprachen, before becoming a soldier. He ran the factory of his father, which went bankrupt in 1822.

In 1812, he married Anna Nödel, and they had at least five children. He was a member of the Unsinnsgesellschaft (Nonsense Society) from 1817, a group of painters, actors, writers and musicians (like Franz Schubert), who participated in revelries ostensibly devoted to the god "Insanius" (Unsinn). From 1823, he also belonged to a literary society Ludlamshöhle, named after a play by Adam Oehlenschläger. Although apparently a benign social club, it was banned in 1826 for "endangering the state".

From 1821, Kupelwieser worked for two years as the dramaturge at the Vienna Court Opera, where he began his activities as a translator, poet and librettist. He became involved in an affair with the actress Emilie Neumann. The play Rosamunde by Helmina von Chézy was apparently written for her at his request. Eventually, his wife left him and took their children. He also lost his job but had a successful career with engagements in Graz, to where he followed Neumann, and then from 1825 in Pressburg (today Bratislava). He moved to Agram (today Zagreb) in 1829, where he served as director for two months. From 1836 to 1862, he once again worked as a dramaturge, now at the Theater in der Josefstadt. His second wife was Elise Sedelmeyer.

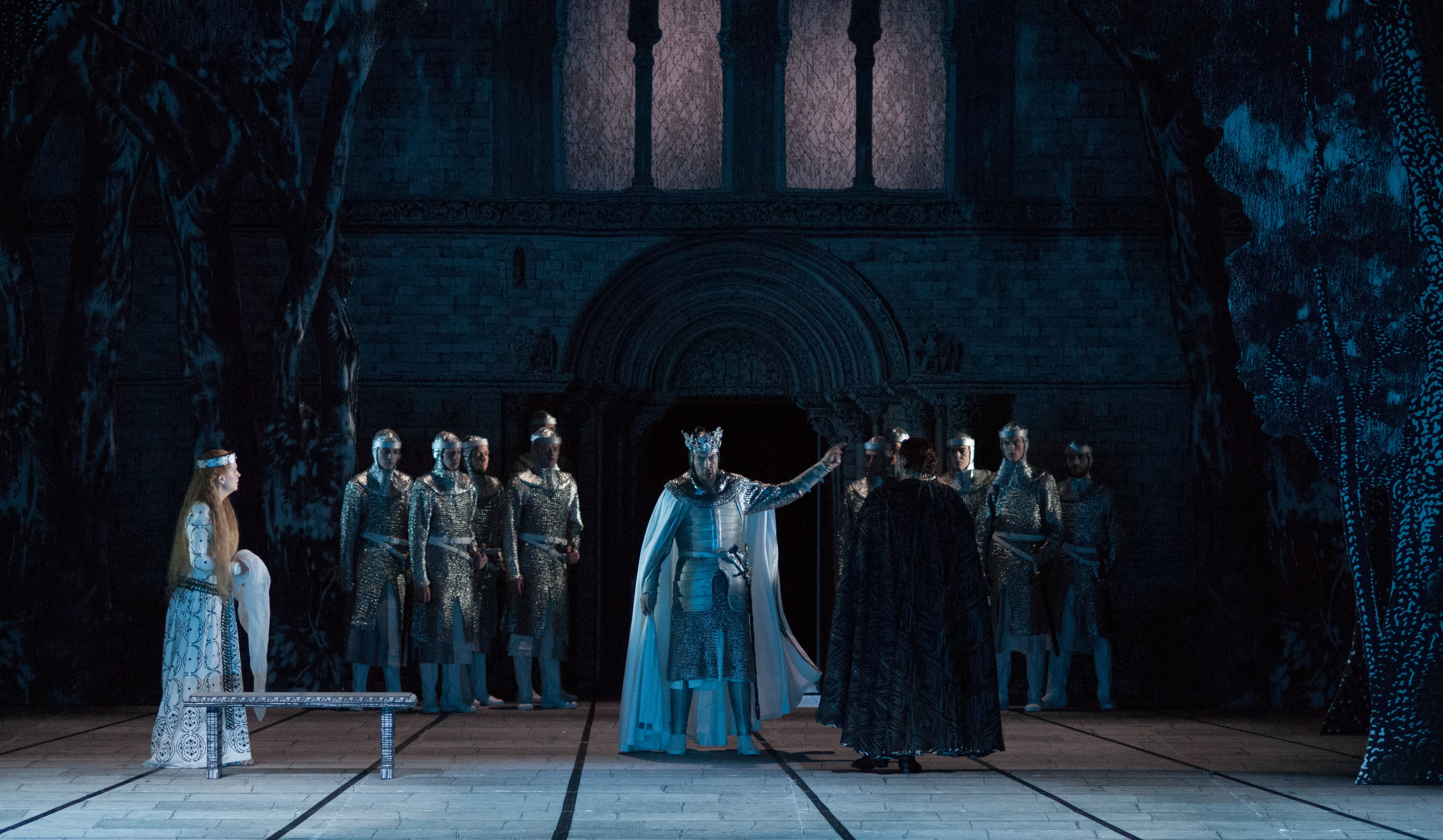
Scene from a performance of Schubert's Fierrabras at the Salzburg Festival in 2014

His best-known work is the libretto for the opera Fierrabras, by Franz Schubert, whom he had befriended at the Nonsense Society. Although written and approved by the censors in 1823, it was not performed at the court theatre then. Schubert blamed the librettist, writing in a letter to Leopold Kupelwieser that the opera written by his brother "has been declared to be unusable, and in consequence, there has been no demand for my music". A concert version was performed in 1835, and a staged version finally played in 1897. Kupelwieser also wrote the libretto for Die Müllerin von Burgos, a "comédie en vaudevilles" by Franz von Suppé, in addition to translating and editing librettos for operas, mostly from French to German for performances in Vienna, including Boieldieu's Les voitures versées, Meyerbeer's Il crociato in Egitto, Rossini's Le siège de Corinthe and Matilde di Shabran, Donizetti's Les martyrs and Maria di Rohan, Michael William Balfe's The Bohemian Girl, and Ferdinand Hérold's Zampa. Kupelwieser died in Rudolfsheim, now part of Vienna.

Leopold Kupelwieser, his younger brother, was a well-known painter.
