= Eduard Gurk =

Austrian painter (1801–1841)

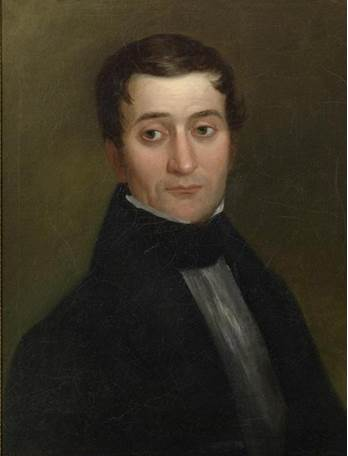
Self-portrait (date unknown)

Eduard Gurk (17 November 1801 – 31 March 1841) was an Austrian landscape painter and printmaker, who worked for the Habsburg Court under the Emperors Francis I and Ferdinand I. He was especially well known as a watercolorist.

== Biography ==
He was born in Vienna. His father was Joseph Ignaz Gurk (1773–1835), a painter who served as head of the art gallery and library of Nikolaus II, Prince Esterházy. He accompanied his parents on a trip through Northern Europe, ending in England, where he was first attracted to watercolor painting. Upon returning to Vienna in 1819, he enrolled at the Academy of Fine Arts and held his first exhibition in 1822. The following year, together with his father, he published a book containing 80 views of Viennese monuments and buildings, engraved and colored by hand.

This attracted attention in high places, and he was soon being sponsored by Klemens von Metternich, who found him employment as chief assistant to the court painter, Johann Baptist Hoechle (1754–1832). In that position, he accompanied Archduke John of Austria and Crown Prince Ferdinand on many of their travels, and produced an album of scenes from Ferdinand's coronation as King of Hungary in 1830. Three years later, he and the new court painter, Johann Baptist's son, Johann Nepomuk Hoechle, collaborated on a series of watercolors showing Ferdinand's pilgrimage to Mariazell.

In 1835, Ferdinand became Emperor and Hoechle died unexpectedly, after having been court painter for only two years, so Gurk was appointed to replace him. Once again, much of his work involved travelling with the Royal Family.

In 1840, he took a voyage to the Middle East with the Austrian fleet, by invitation of Rear Admiral Francesco Bandiera. Disembarking at Beirut, he continued down the coast, documenting the exploits of Archduke Friedrich, who had recently been awarded the Military Order of Maria Theresa. However, when Gurk arrived in Jerusalem, already ill from the voyage, he came down with typhoid fever and died three days later.

== Selected paintings ==
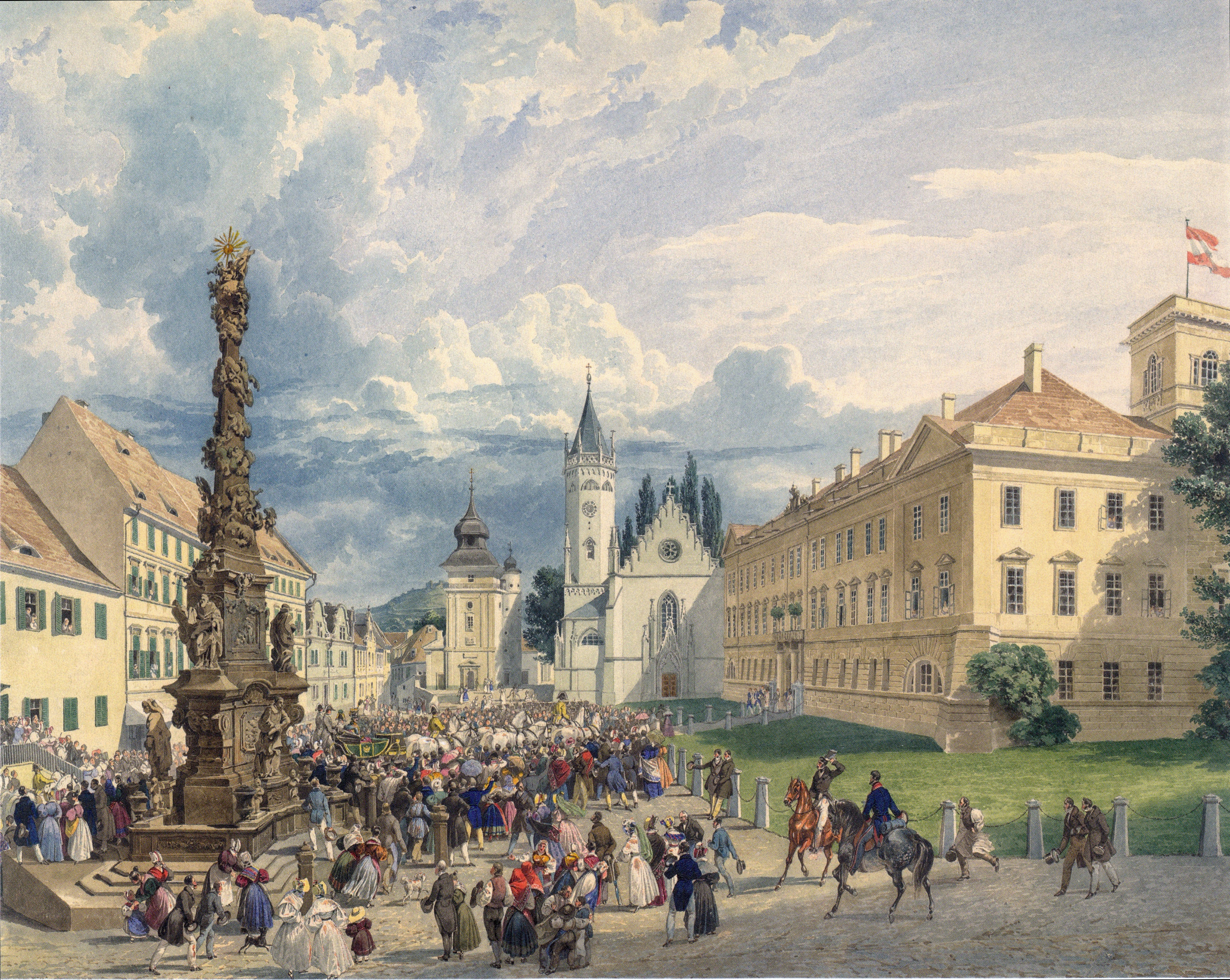
The "Kaiserbesuch" in Teplitz (1836)

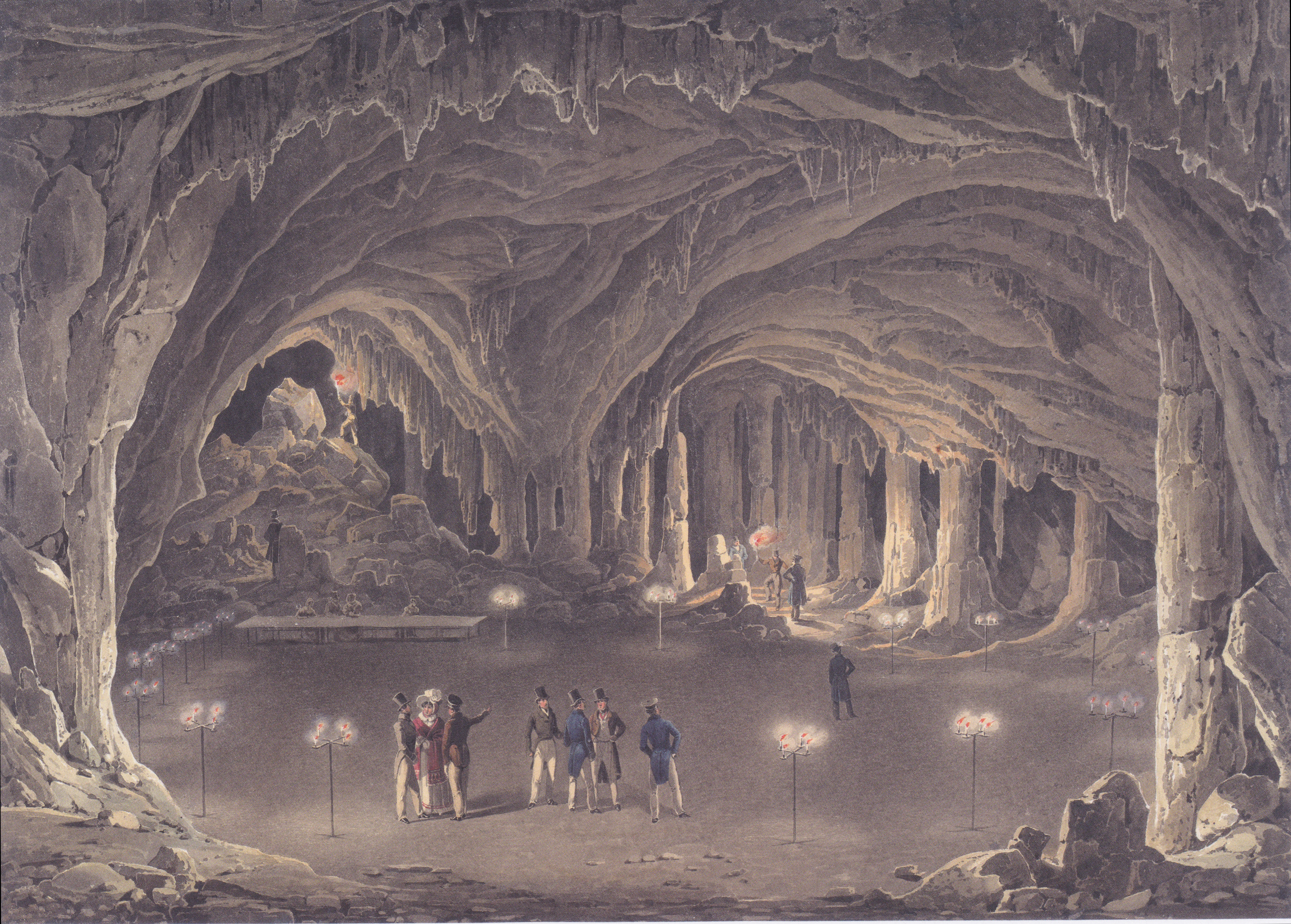
Adelsberger Grotte (1834)

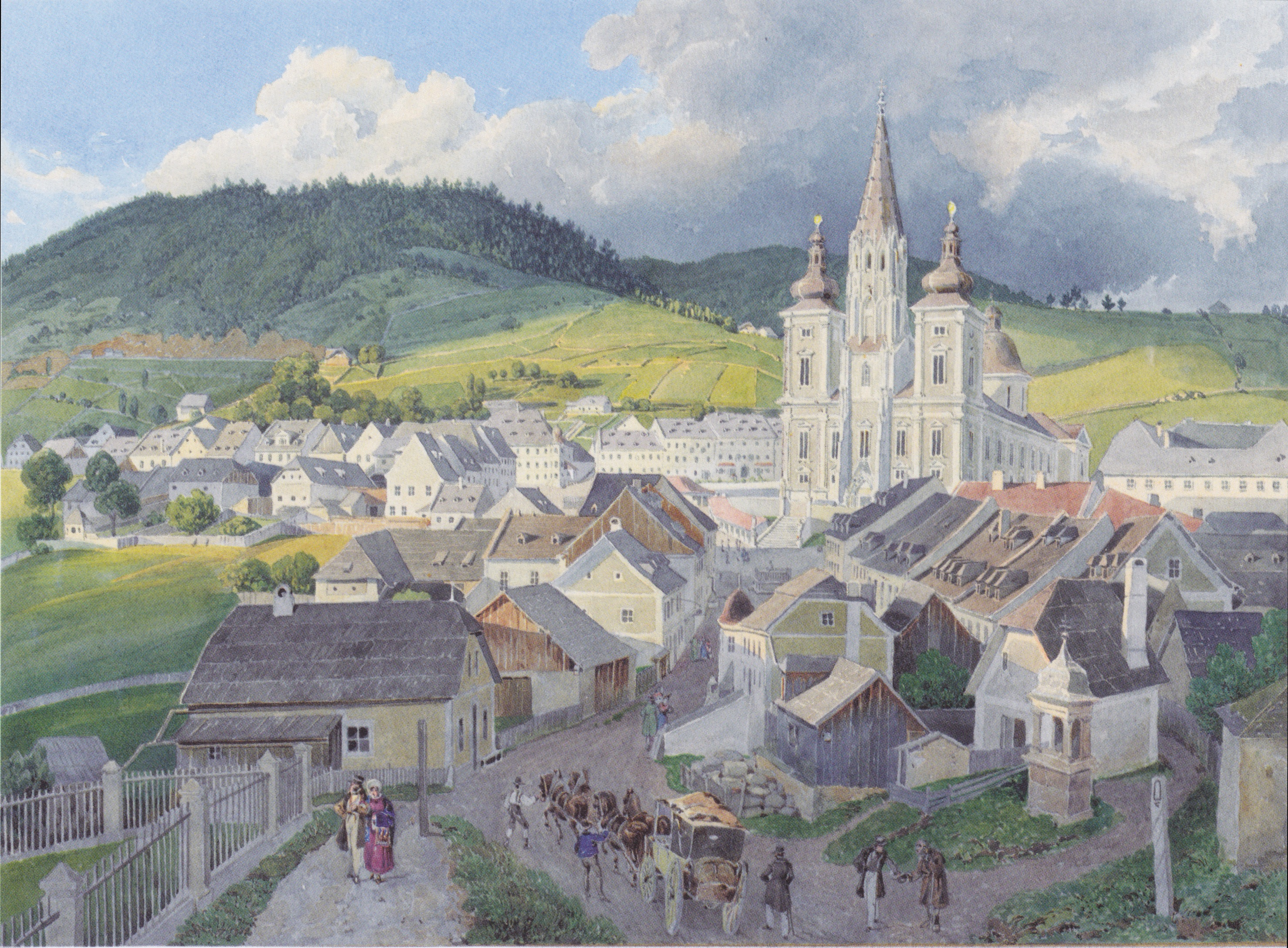
Grace Church in Mariazell (1833)

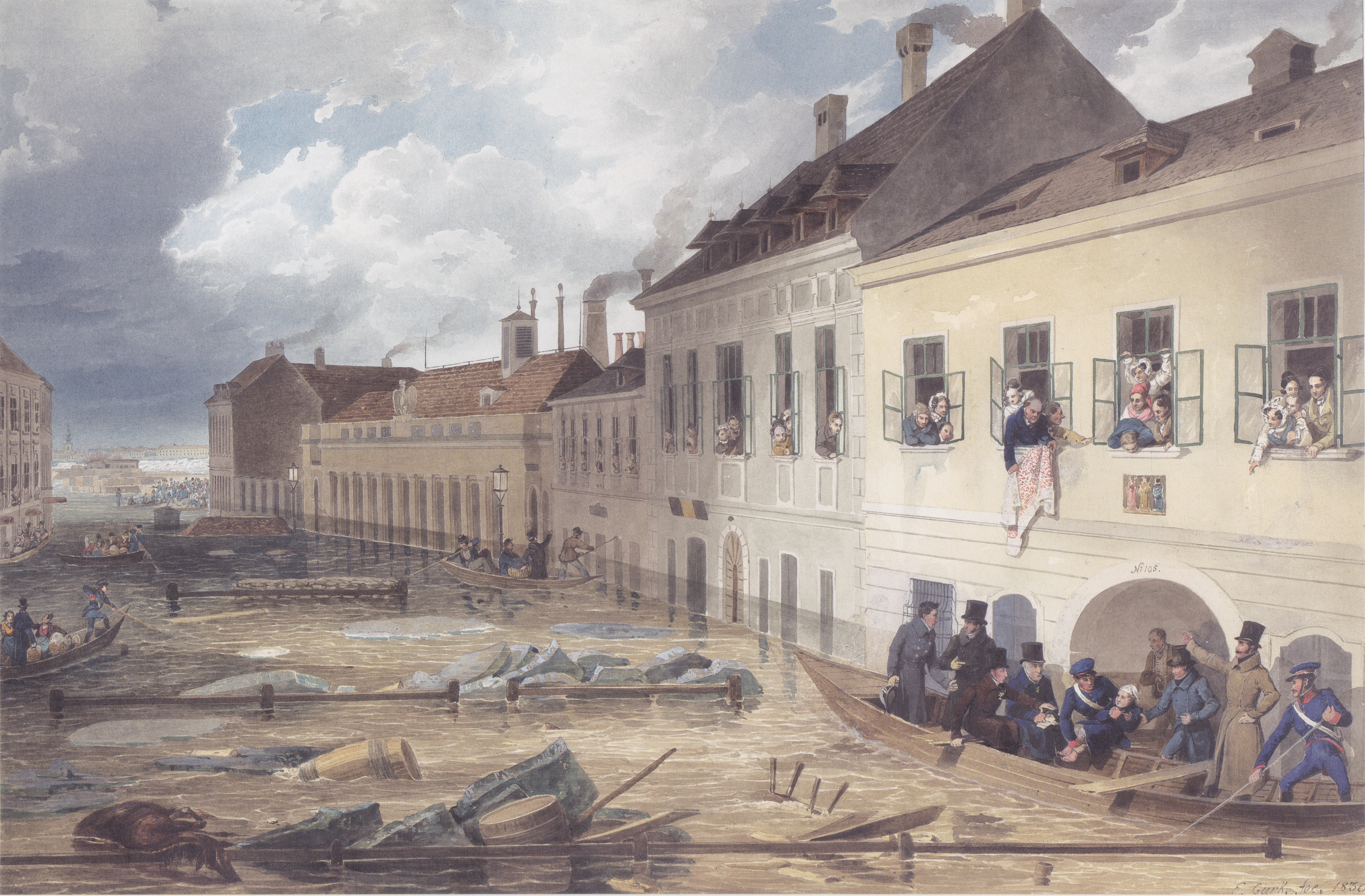
The Great Flood of 1830
in Vienna
