= Leopold Kupelwieser =

Austrian painter (1796–1862)

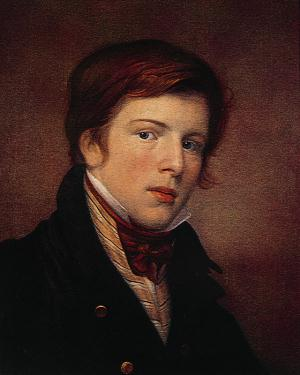
- Self-portrait (c. 1813)
- Born: Leopold Kupelwieser; 17 October 1796; Markt Piesting, Habsburg monarchy
- Died: 17 November 1862 (aged 66); Vienna, Austrian Empire
- Occupation: Painter

Leopold Kupelwieser (17 October 1796 – 17 November 1862) was an Austrian painter, often associated with the Nazarene movement.

== Biography ==
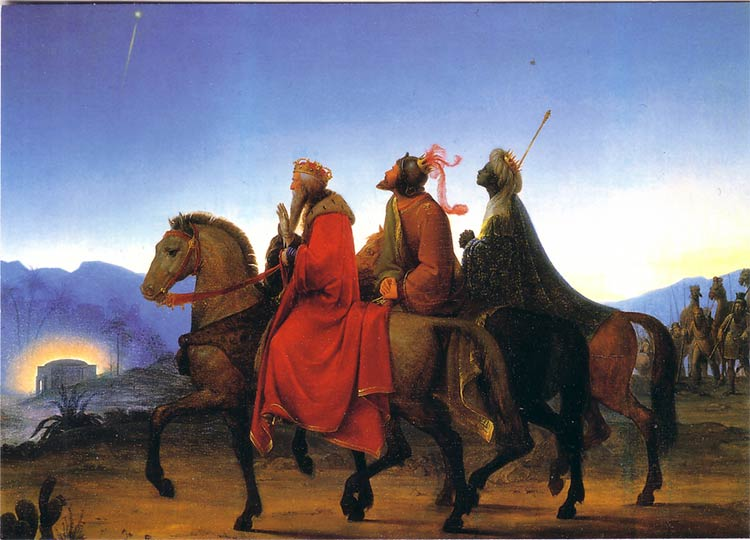
Journey of the Three Kings (1825)

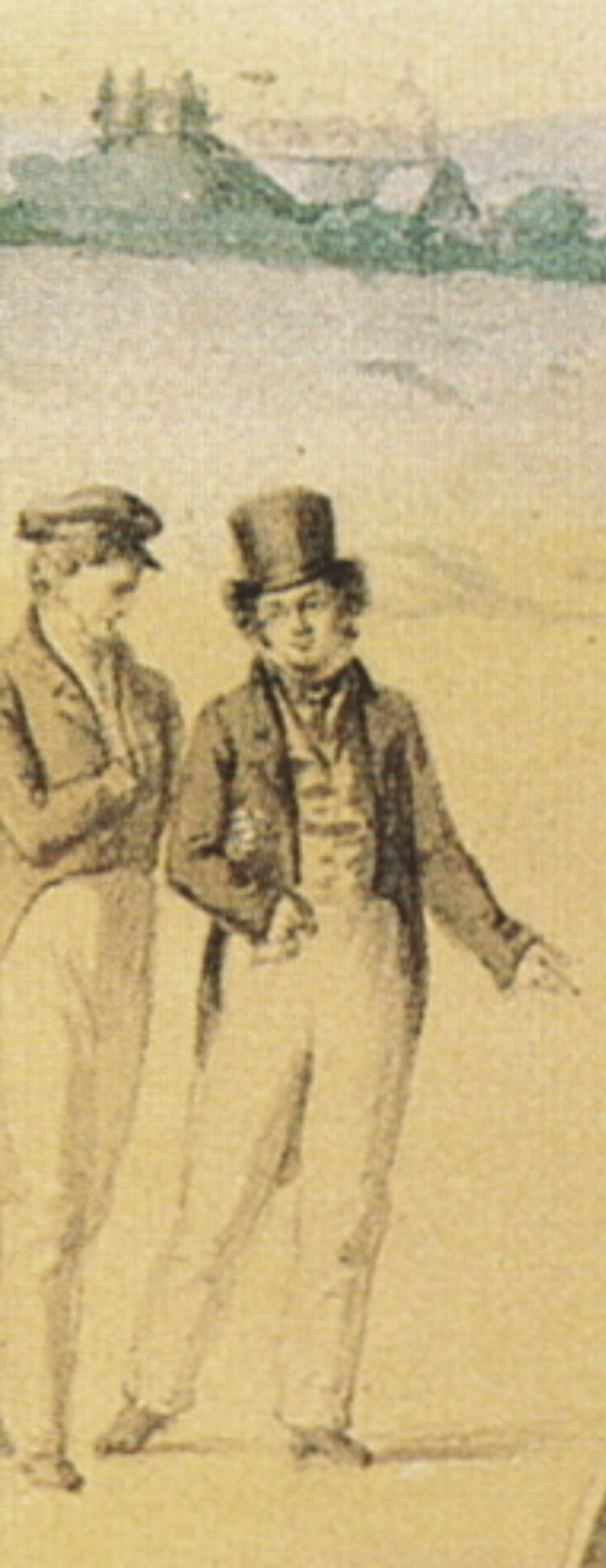
Kupelwieser and Franz Schubert in the former's watercolour Landpartie der Schubertianer von Atzenbrugg nach Aumühl (Detail), 1820

Kupelwieser was born on 17 October 1796 in Markt Piesting. He was the son of Johann Baptist Georg Kilian Kupelwieser (1760–1813), co-owner of a factory that produced tableware. His talents were recognized at an early age by the sculptor Franz Anton von Zauner and by the time he was twelve, he was already attending the Academy of Fine Arts, Vienna.

During a stay in Rome in 1824, he came under the influence of Friedrich Overbeck and the Nazarene movement. After the death of Alexei Sergeyevich Berezin, a Russian nobleman who had been his patron there, he returned to Vienna and earned his living primarily as an illustrator and portrait painter, although he is also known to have painted shop signs.

His brother was the theatrical director Joseph Kupelwieser, who wrote the libretto for Franz Schubert's opera Fierrabras. With his brother, Joseph, he was a member of the "Schubertianer" (friends of Schubert), a group that often got together for summers at the Schloss Atzenbrugg, west of Vienna. In 1826, Leopold married Maria Johanna Evangelista Augustina Stephania Theodora Lutz, an occasion which was marked by Schubert's composition, the "Kupelwieser Waltz" (never written down, but passed along by the family and later transcribed by Richard Strauss).

In 1837, he became Professor of history painting at the Academy and, in 1850, was awarded the Knight's Cross of the Order of Franz Joseph. Virtually all of his later work involved religious altarpieces and frescoes. At the age of sixty he fell ill, apparently due to the rigors of painting on wet lime, and never recovered his health. He died on 17 November 1862 in Vienna.

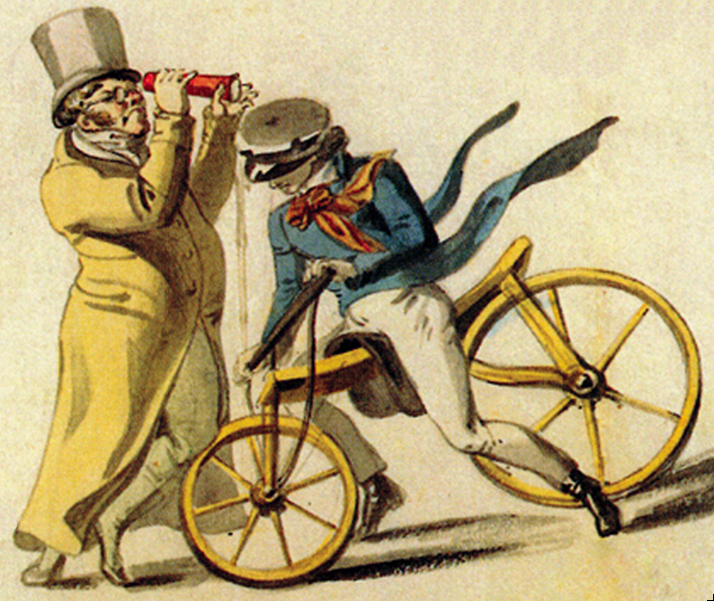
Das Kaleidoskop und die Draisine, Kupelwieser's caricature of himself and Franz Schubert for the Unsinnsgesellschaft (16 July 1818)

== Legacy ==
In 1894, a street was named in his honor and a commemorative stamp was issued in 1996. He is a character in Das Dreimäderlhaus (House of the Three Girls, 1916), a pastiche operetta, derived from the music of Schubert by Heinrich Berté, based on the novel Schwammerl (Mushroom, one of Schubert's nicknames) by Rudolf Hans Bartsch. Kupelwieser is honoured in street names in his birthplace (Kupelwieserstraße in Markt Piesting), Kupelwiesergasse in Hietzing, Vienna and in the Austrian towns of Wiener Neustadt, St. Pölten and Atzenbrugg.

== Gallery ==
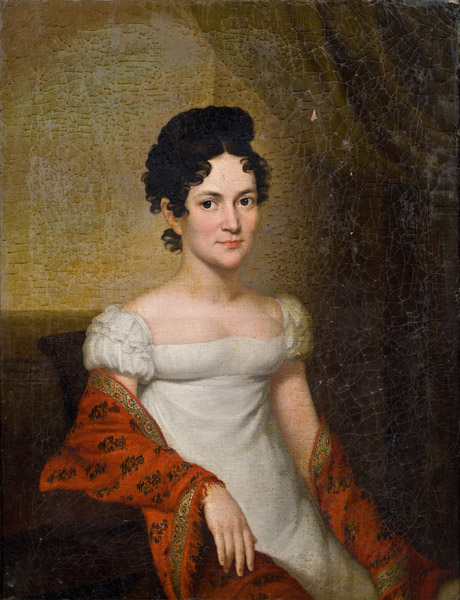
Caroline Bonaparte, 1819

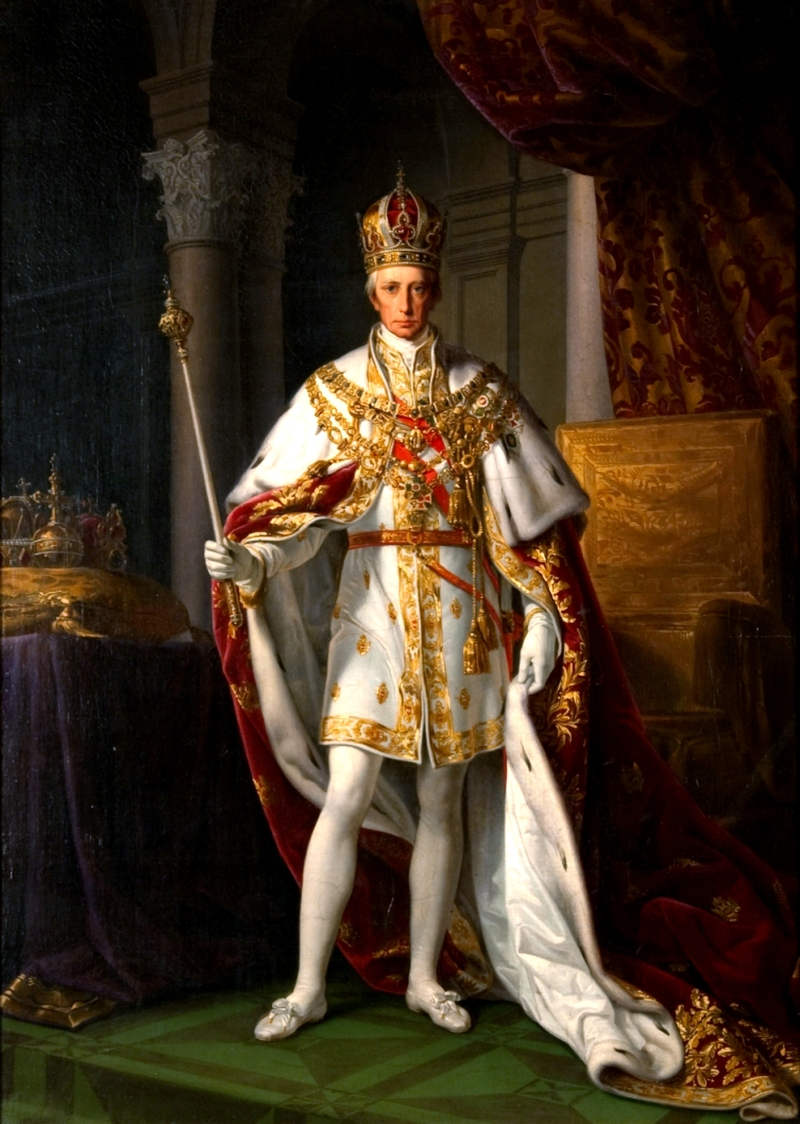
Francis II, Holy Roman Emperor, 1830

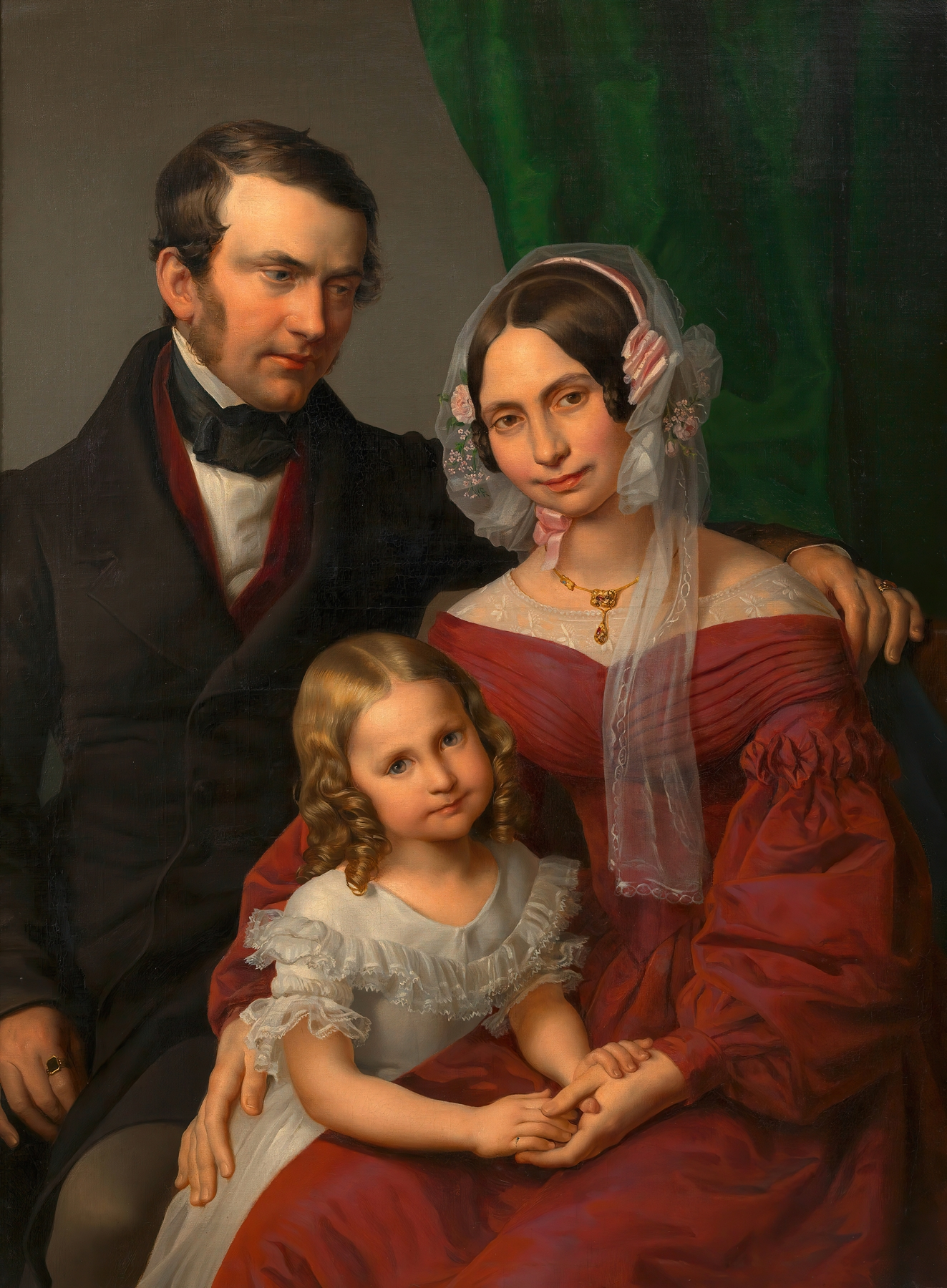
The Lössl Family, 1841

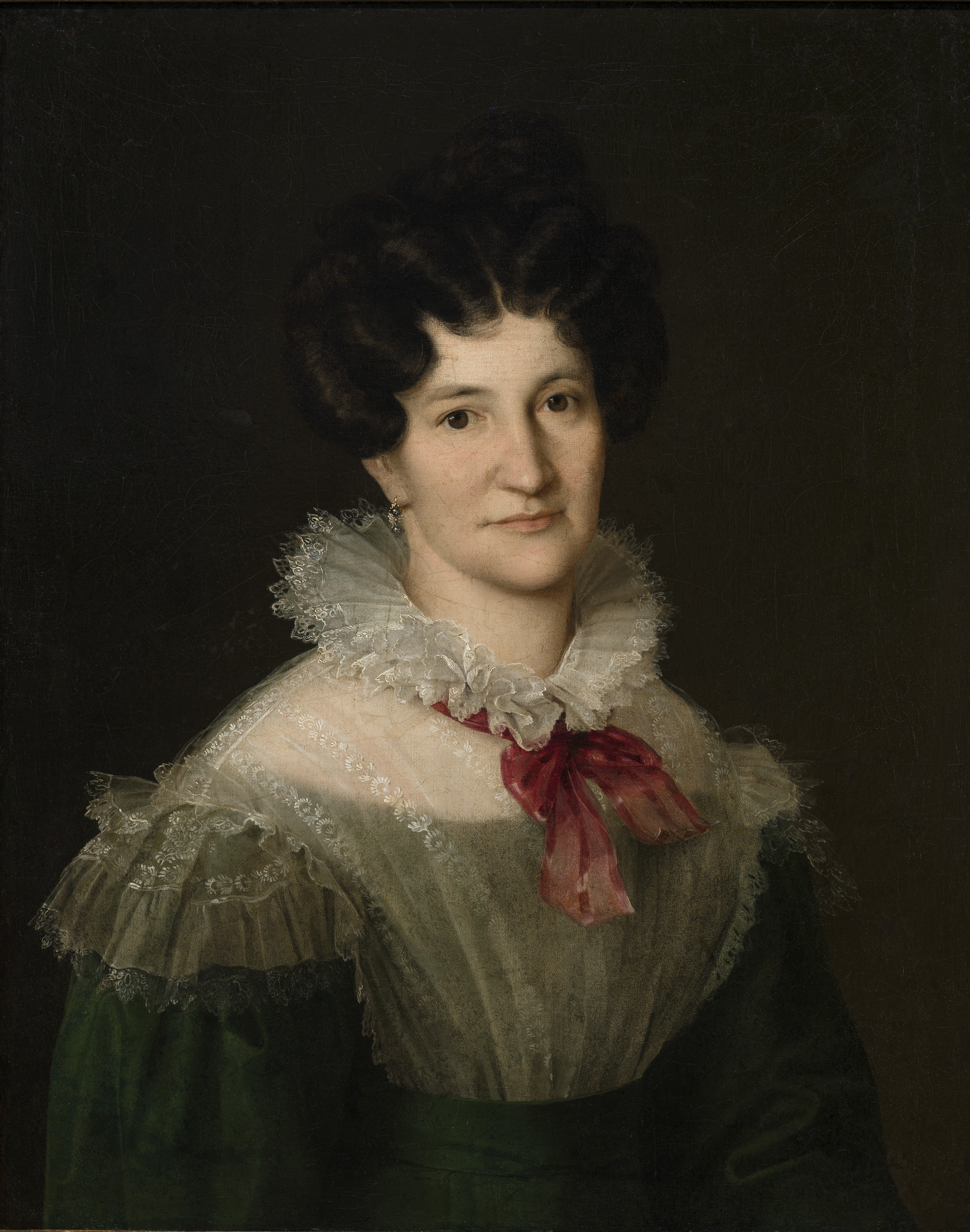
Anna Schrimer, 1815/1816
