= Fierrabras =

1823 opera by Franz Schubert

- Opera by Franz Schubert
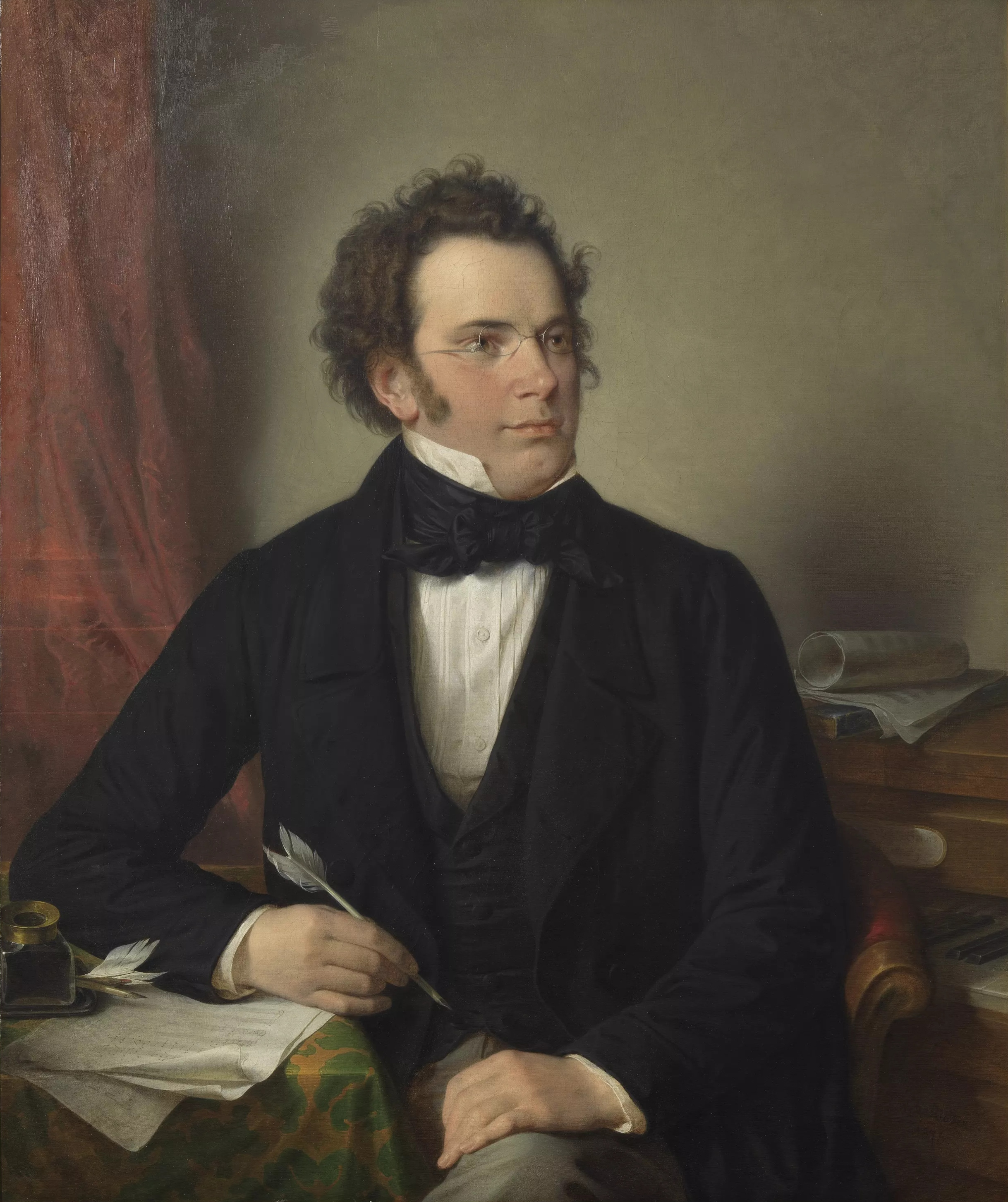
- Schubert
- Translation: The Poacher
- Librettist: Joseph Kupelwieser
- Language: German
- Based on: stories surrounding Charlemagne
- Premiere: 1897; Hoftheater Karlsruhe

Fierrabras, D 796, is a three-act German opera with spoken dialogue written by the composer Franz Schubert in 1823, to a libretto by Joseph Kupelwieser, the general manager of the Theater am Kärntnertor (Vienna's Court Opera Theatre). Like Alfonso und Estrella (1822), it marks Schubert's attempt to compose a grand Romantic opera in German, departing from the Singspiel tradition. It had to wait until 1897 for a (relatively) complete performance.

== Composition history and background ==
=== The commission ===
The Kärntnertor Theater in 1822 commissioned operas from Schubert and Carl Maria von Weber in a drive to increase the number of German operas in the repertoire. Schubert fulfilled his commission with Fierrabras, and Weber his with Euryanthe. The Italian theatre director Domenico Barbaja, who had taken over the theatre in 1821, at the same time brought Rossini to Vienna to oversee the production of several of his operas at the Kärntnertor Theater. Rossini's operas were so popular that Euryanthe unsuccessfully premiered in October 1823, resulting in the shelving of plans to stage Fierrabras, and the resignation of Joseph Kupelwieser as director of the theatre, complaining of "arrogance" on the part of Barbaja. As a result, Schubert never saw the opera staged, or even received payment for his work.

=== The libretto ===
The libretto by Kupelwieser is about the adventures of the Moorish knight Fierabras, and his eventual conversion to Christianity. It is based on stories surrounding Charlemagne, including tales of how Fierrabras' sister falls in love with one of Charlemagne's knights, and the love interest between Charlemagne's daughter Emma and another of his knights, Eginhard. Kupelwieser had likely drawn his inspiration from German publications of the tales of Charlemagne, including an 1806 translation La puente de Mantible by Calderón. Notable deviations from the sources include the name of the Moorish prince (Baligant in the sources, Boland in the libretto), the spelling of Fierrabras (usually "Fierabras"), and the love interest of Fierrabras' sister (Kupelwieser used Roland as her lover, where the legends have Gui de Bourgogne.)

Kupelwieser, who did not have great experience at libretto-writing, submitted the completed libretto to the censors on July 21, 1823, and it was approved on August 19 with minor changes, well after Schubert had started work on the music. Since Kupelwieser, as director of the Kärntnertor Theater, had experience dealing with Prince Metternich's censors, he appears to have engaged in self-censorship to avoid difficulties with the libretto. For example, instead of referring to the partisans in the drama as French and Spanish, he labels them as Franks and Moors. He also referred to a "supreme faith" rather than Christianity.

=== The music ===
Schubert frequently marked his manuscripts with dates indicating when he worked on them. The manuscripts for this work show the following dates:

- Act 1: 25 – 30 May 1823
- Act 2: 31 May – 5 June 1823
- Act 3: 7 June – 26 September 1823
- Overture: 2 October 1823

As the libretto was not approved by the censors until August 1823, Schubert was required to make some small changes to already-composed material.

== Performance history ==
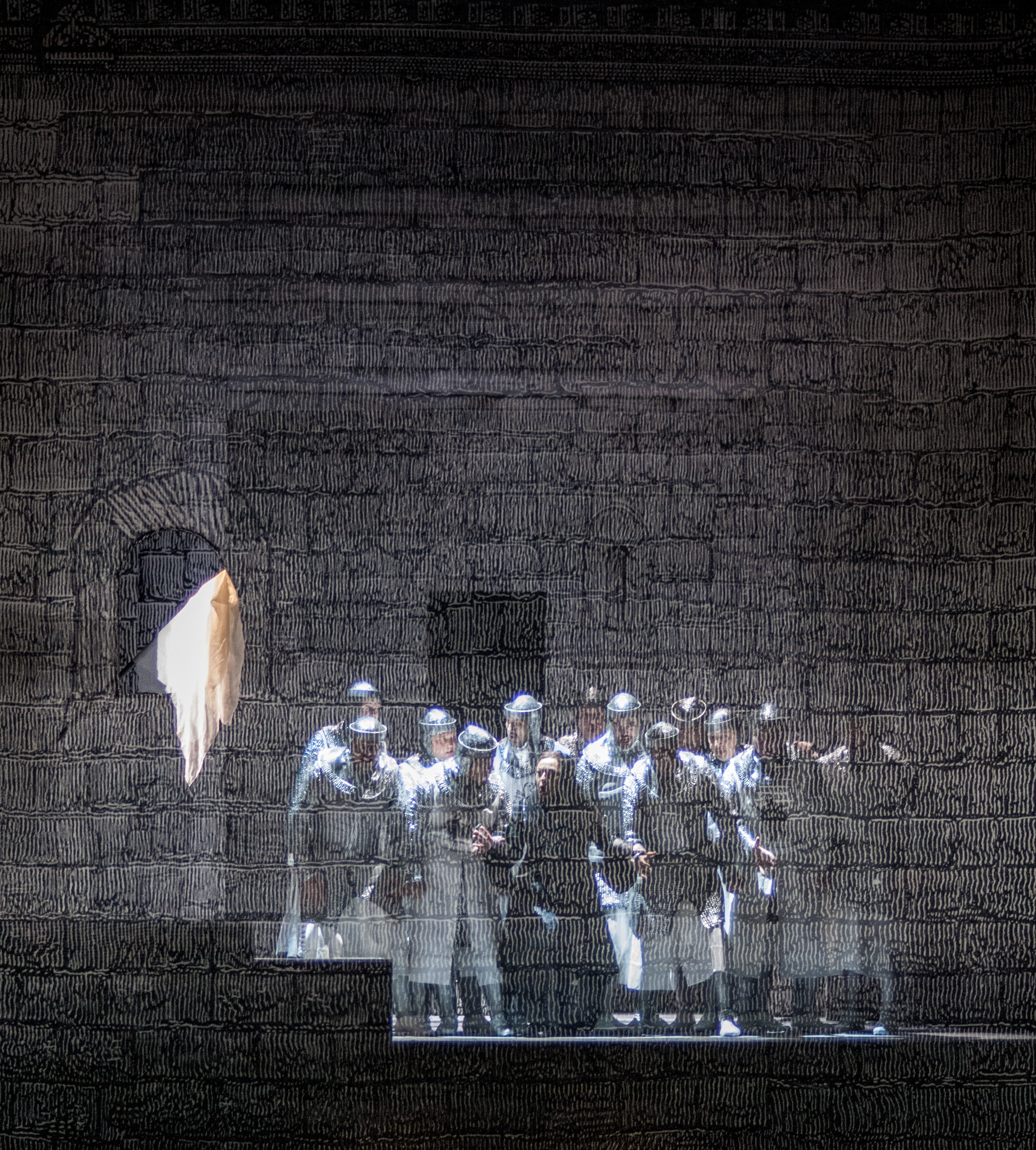
Fierrabras at the Salzburg Festival 2014

On May 7, 1835 (seven years after Schubert's death), at the Theater in der Josefstadt, Vienna, a concert version of several numbers was staged. The work is generally considered to suffer from an extremely weak libretto. Its first full performance was not until 1897, despite "much magnificent music in Schubert’s score", when it was given at the Hoftheater Karlsruhe under the direction of Felix Mottl. The 1897 performance was edited by Mottl for the tastes of the day, resulting in scenes being cut, and ballet interludes injected into the performance.

In the 20th century, the opera received a radio broadcast from Brussels on January 14, 1926. A London concert on November 6, 1938, featured excerpts from the work. An abridged version of the opera was given in a 1959 radio broadcast from Bern, and later issued on record. The first British performance was a Radio 3 broadcast on April 10, 1971.

Concert versions of the opera were presented in 1978 in Perugia, and in 1980 in Aachen, and staged revivals (presumably of the Mottl version) took place in the early 1980s in Philadelphia, Augsburg, and Hermance. The 1980 Philadelphia production was the opera's first performance in the United States. It was mounted by the Academy of Vocal Arts at the Walnut Street Theatre with Paul Spencer Adkins in the title role.

In 1988, Claudio Abbado directed performances of a complete staging of the opera (likely the first performances that used all of Schubert's music) at the Theater an der Wien, which formed the basis of the first complete recording of the work. Fierrabras was also performed at La Scala in Milan in the 2022–2023 season. The production had a contemporary approach, with a director who reinterpreted the story while maintaining the romantic essence of the opera, accompanied by an evocative scenography.

== Instrumentation ==
The opera is scored for two flutes, two oboes, two clarinets, two bassoons, four horns, two trumpets, three trombones, timpani, and strings.

== Roles ==
Roles, voice types, premiere cast
Role	Voice type	Premiere cast, 9 February 1897 Conductor: Felix Mottl
Karl, King of the Franks	bass	Philler
Emma, his daughter	soprano	Henriette Mottl-Standhartner
Eginhard, one of Karl's knights	tenor	Hermann Rosenberg
Roland, one of Karl's knights	baritone	Hans Pokorny
Ogier, one of Karl's knights	tenor	Wilhelm Guggenbühler
Boland, Moorish leader	baritone	Fritz Plank
Fierrabras, Boland's son	tenor	Emil Gerhäuser
Florinda, Boland's daughter	soprano	Pauline Mailhac
Maragond	soprano	Christine Friedlein
Brutamonte	bass	Carl Nebe
Ladies, knights, soldiers

== Synopsis ==
=== Act 1 ===
Emma, the daughter of King Karl (Charlemagne, from the German name for Charlemagne, Karl der Große), is in love with Eginhard. Their love must be kept secret since Karl does not approve. Karl's knights, led by Roland, have defeated the Moors and captured Fierrabras, the son of the Moorish prince Boland. Karl does not imprison Fierrabras. When they are brought to Karl's castle, Fierrabras spies Emma, and recognizes her as someone he fell in love with in Rome. Eginhard and Emma meet in the garden at night, but are interrupted by Fierrabras. The lovers plead with Fierrabras to protect Eginhard from Karl. Fierrabras agrees, and Eginhard makes his escape. The king approaches, and, thinking Fierrabras is trying to kidnap Emma, has him thrown in chains. As the act ends, Eginhard and the knights are preparing to leave.

=== Act 2 ===
Eginhard (without clarifying the matter concerning Emma and Fierrabras) has been sent to Boland with Roland and Karl's other knights for peace talks. The Moors surprise Eginhard, capture him, and bring him to the Moorish castle, where Boland and his daughter Florinda are concerned over Fierrabras' fate. Eginhard informs them of Fierrabras' imprisonment. The rest of Karl's knights arrive for the peace talks. Boland, upset over Fierrabras' imprisonment, takes them prisoner and condemns them to death. Among the knights, his daughter Florinda recognizes Roland, (with whom she fell in love while in Rome) and decides to try to help them. She manages to free Eginhard, and, after a brief interlude with Roland, frees the knights from the castle prison. The knights, after a battle in which Roland is captured, are returned to the prison, where Boland is upset over Florinda's behavior.

=== Act 3 ===
Emma, who is waiting for Eginhard's return, confesses to her father that Fierrabras is innocent, and that she and Eginhard are in love. Karl frees Fierrabras, and they leave with Eginhard to go to the Moorish castle to free the imprisoned knights. The knights are being led to the execution pyre. Florinda pleads with Boland to spare Roland. In anger, Boland says that if she loves Roland, she can die with him. Karl, Eginhard, and Fierrabras arrive just in time to stop the executions, and convince Boland to release the knights. Karl and Boland make peace and allow Roland and Florinda to marry, as well as Eginhard and Emma. Fierrabras joins Karl's knights.

== Recordings ==
- 1959 – Myto MCD 89001: Otto von Rohr, Sieglinde Kahmann, Raymond Wolansky, Hans Ulrich Mielsch, Fritz Wunderlich, Rudo Timper, Hetty Plümacher, Melanie Geissler, Manfred Röhrl; Südfunk-Chor; Radio Bern Chamber Chorus; Bern State Orchestra; Hans Müller-Kray, conductor (highly abridged, from a radio broadcast)
- 1978, September 16, live in Perugia – House of Opera CDR 25247: Gabriel Chmura/Rinaldi/Cortez/Orth/Werner Hollweg/Schramm/Hillebrand
- 1988, May 8–23, live* – Deutsche Grammophon 427 341-2 (2-CD set): Robert Holl, Karita Mattila, Thomas Hampson, Robert Gambill, Josef Protschka, László Polgár, Cheryl Studer, Brigitte Balleys, Hartmut Welker; Arnold Schoenberg Choir; Chamber Orchestra of Europe; Claudio Abbado, conductor (first essentially complete recording; *Cheryl Studer's contribution was a studio overlay, as she did not sing in the live run)
- 2002, Zurich – Premiere Opera DVD 8907: Welser-Möst/Kozlowska/Chuchrova/Strehl/Kaufmann/Volle/Polgár
- 2006 – EMI Classics 00969 (DVD): Jonas Kaufmann, Juliane Banse, Christoph Strehl, László Polgár, Guido Gotzen, Franz Welser-Möst, conductor, Claus Guth, director, Chorus and Orchestra of the Zurich Opera House
- 2014 – C Major 730804 (Blu-Ray): Salzburg Festival; Georg Zeppenfeld, Julia Kleiter, Markus Werba, Franz Gruber; Vienna Philharmonic, Ingo Metzmacher, conductor; Peter Stein, director

== Notes ==
=== References ===
- McKay, Elizabeth Norman (1990). "Fierrabras: An Introduction". Fierrabras (booklet). Claudio Abbado/Chamber Orchestra of Europe/Arnold Schoenberg Choir. Hamburg: Deutsche Grammophon. DG 427 341-2.
- McKay, Elizabeth Norman (1991). Franz Schubert's Music for the Theater. Tutzing: Hans Schneider.
- Neef, Sigrid (1990). "Franz Schuberts Heroisch-romantische Oper Fierrabras". Fierrabras (booklet) (in German). Claudio Abbado/Chamber Orchestra of Europe/Arnold Schoenberg Choir. Hamburg: Deutsche Grammophon. DG 427 341-2.
