= Heinrich Anschütz =

German actor (1785 - 1865)

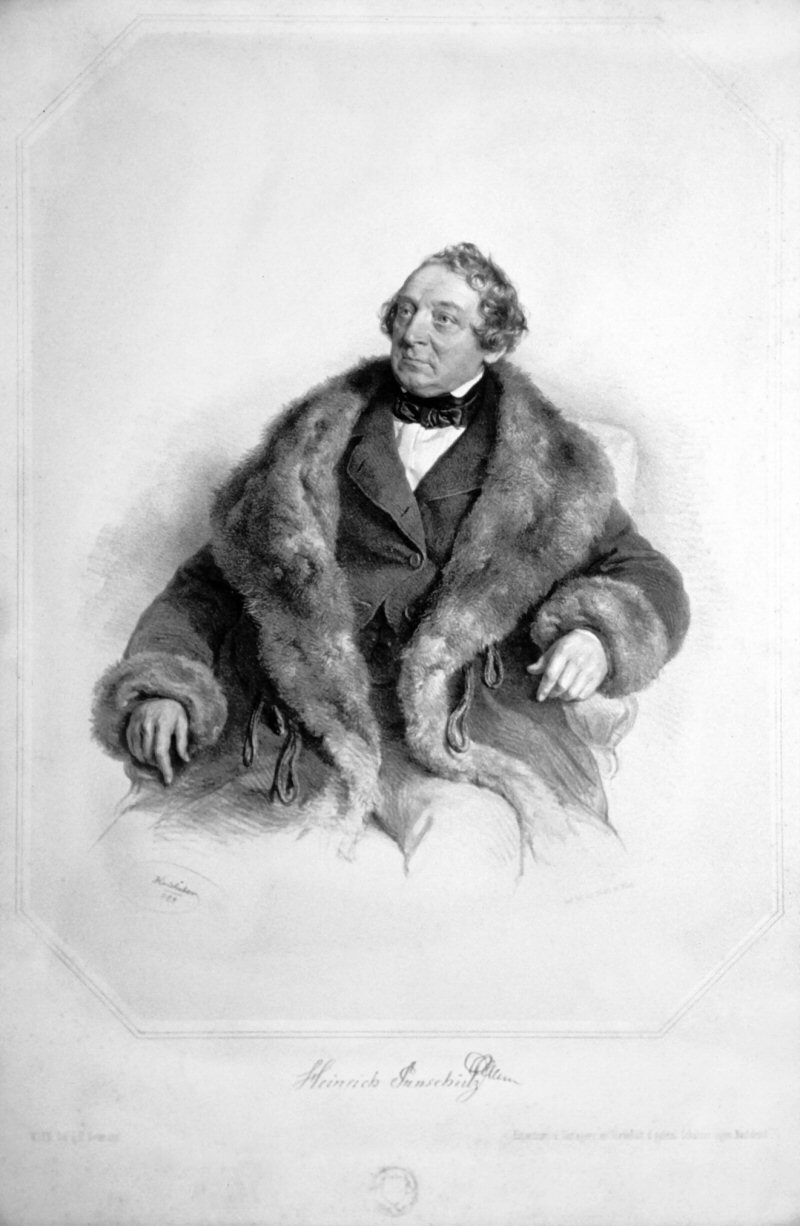
- Born: 8 February 1785; Luckau, Electorate of Saxony, Holy Roman Empire
- Died: 29 December 1865 (aged 80); Vienna, Austrian Empire

Heinrich Anschütz (8 February 1785 in Luckau – 29 December 1865 in Vienna) was a German actor.

== Biography ==
He studied at the University of Leipzig, in which city he saw the performances of August Wilhelm Iffland, Ferdinand Esslair, and other distinguished actors who occasionally played there. He began his career as an actor at Nuremberg in 1807, and finally became a member of the Hofburgtheater in Vienna. He played both heroic and character parts, and was for many years the central figure at the famous playhouse with which he was so long identified. He published an autobiography under the title of Heinrich Anschütz, Erinnerungen aus dessen Leben und Wirken (Heinrich Anschütz, Recollections from his life and works; Vienna, 1866).
