= Johann Nepomuk Hoechle =

Austrian painter (1790–1835)

Blasius Höfel
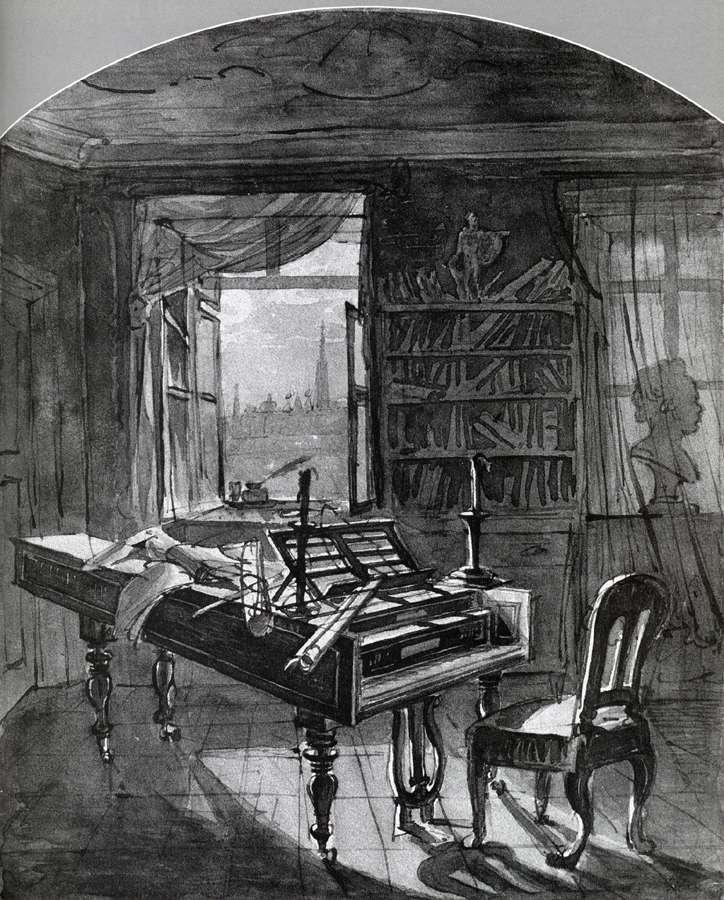
- Beethoven's Study at the Schwarzspanierhaus, wash on paper, 1827, Vienna Museum
- Born: 16 September 1790; Munich, Electorate of Bavaria
- Died: 12 December 1835 (aged 45); Vienna, Austrian Empire
- Known for: Engraving
- Movement: Painting; Lithography

Johann Nepomuk Hoechle (16 September 1790, Munich - 12 December 1835, Vienna) was an Austrian painter and lithographer who specialized in scenes from military actions and current events.

== Biography ==
His father was Johann Baptist Hoechle (1754-1832), an artist from Switzerland who later became court painter for the Habsburgs. When he was still a child, he was apprenticed to the engraver and etcher, Ferdinand Kobell, who died shortly after, in 1799. The following year, his father took him to Vienna. From 1804 to 1808, he was enrolled at the Academy of Fine Arts, where he studied history painting with Heinrich Friedrich Füger and landscape painting with Michael Wutky. His later career as a battle painter probably came from the influence of the French marine and military artist, Ignace Duvivier (1758-1832), who Hoechle met while he was visiting Vienna.

This may be what inspired Hoechle, in 1809, to make sketches of the ongoing Battle of Aspern from a hillside near Heiligenstadt. He was found and arrested by French soldiers, who thought he was a spy and were going to have him shot. Luckily, he spoke French and was able to convince the commanding officer that they were mistaken.

In 1814, after further studies in military art, he made more sketches at the scenes of major events, on behalf of Austrian Emperor Francis I, and turned them into paintings at his studio. His most important work from this period, and his best-known overall, depicts the crossing of the Vosges Mountains, following Napoleon's defeat at the Battle of Leipzig.

In 1819, he accompanied the Emperor's entourage to Italy, followed in 1820 by attendance at major military maneuvers in Hungary. That same year, he did a portrait of Ludwig van Beethoven and, shortly after the composer's death in 1827, made a detailed sketch of his study (where he died) in the "Schwarzspanierhaus".

In 1833, he was chosen to succeed his father as court painter, but died only two years later.

== Gallery ==
=== History paintings ===
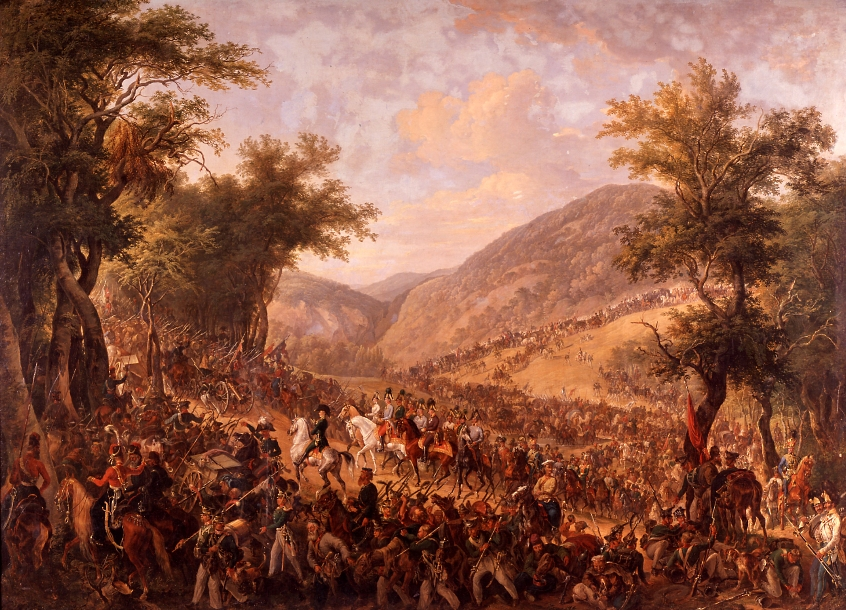
The Crossing of the Vosges, 1815, Museum of Military History, Vienna

Portrait of Francis II, Holy Roman Emperor, c. 1800), Kunsthistorisches Museum, Vienna

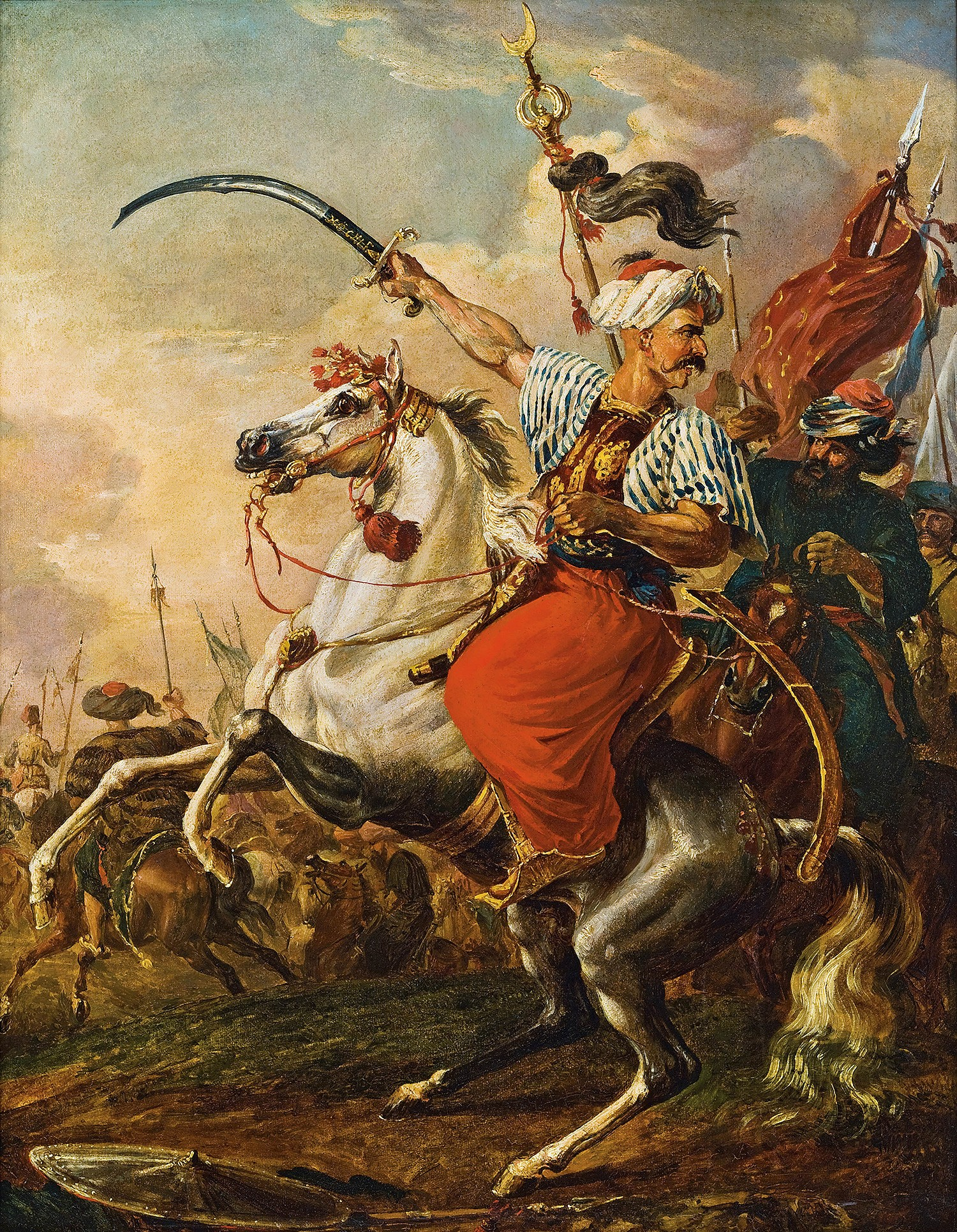
Scene of the Austro-Turkish War (no date), priv. col.

=== Lithographies ===
Burgtor (c. 1825), priv. col

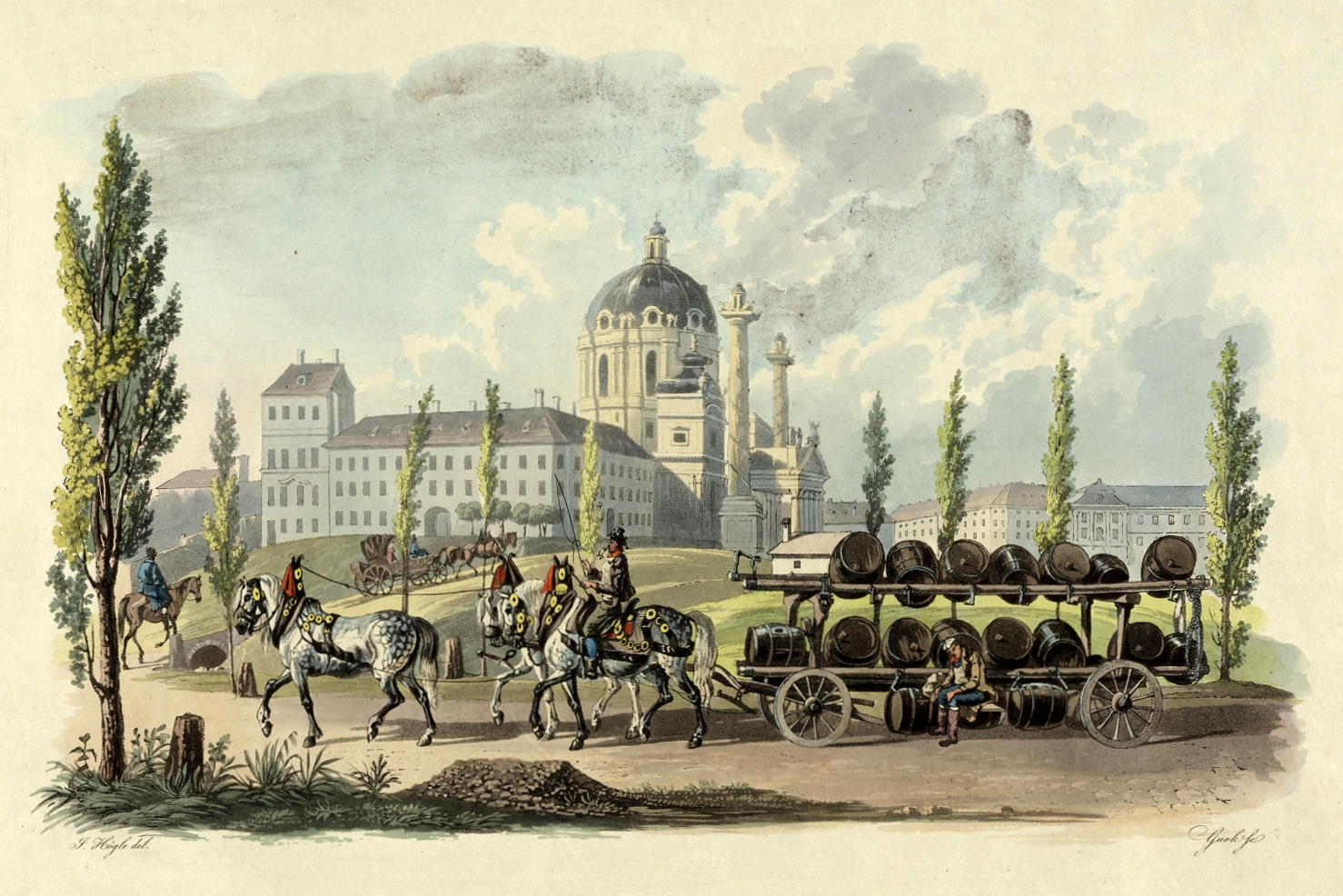
Brewery wagon at Karlsplatz (1825), Austrian National Library, Vienna

Nicholas I on the tomb of Francis I (c. 1835), priv. col.

lioness with cub (1831), Art Institute of Chicago
