= Social liberalism =

Political ideology within liberalism

Social liberalism (Note: Also known as new liberalism in the United Kingdom, modern liberalism in the United States (where it is also simply known as liberalism), left-liberalism (German: Linksliberalismus) in Germany, and progressive liberalism.) is a political philosophy and variety of liberalism that endorses social justice, social services, a mixed economy, and the expansion of civil and political rights, as slightly opposed to classical liberalism which favors limited government and an overall more laissez-faire style of governance. While both are committed to personal freedoms, social liberalism places greater emphasis on the role of government in addressing social inequalities and ensuring public welfare. Social liberal governments address economic and social issues such as poverty, welfare, infrastructure, healthcare, and education using government intervention, while emphasising individual rights and autonomy.

Economically, social liberalism is based on the social market economy and views the common good as harmonious with the individual's freedom. Social liberals overlap with social democrats in accepting market intervention more than other liberals; its importance is considered auxiliary compared to social democrats. Ideologies that emphasize its economic policy include welfare liberalism, New Deal liberalism and New Democrats in the United States, and Keynesian liberalism. Almost all of the Western world has widely adopted social liberal policies.

Social liberal ideas and parties tend to be considered centre to centre-left, although there are deviations from these positions to both the political left or right. (Note: France's centre to centre-right social liberal MoDem, Greenland's centre to centre-right Democrats, Poland's centre-left to left-wing liberal Polish Initiative, Taiwan's left-wing liberal Taiwan Statebuilding Party, South Korea's left-wing liberal Progressive Party and Japan's liberal left-wing populist politician Tarō Yamamoto) In modern political discourse, social liberalism is associated with progressivism, a left-liberalism contrasted to the right-leaning neoliberalism, and combines support for a mixed economy with cultural liberalism.

Cultural liberalism is an ideology that advocates the freedom of individuals to choose whether to conform to cultural norms. In American usage, the term social liberalism may also refer to American progressive stances on sociocultural issues, such as reproductive rights and same-sex marriage, in contrast with American social conservatism. Cultural liberalism is often referred to as social liberalism because it expresses the social dimension of liberalism; however, it is not the same as the broader political ideology known as social liberalism. In American politics, a social liberal may hold either conservative (economic liberal) or progressive views on fiscal policy.

== Origins ==
=== United Kingdom ===
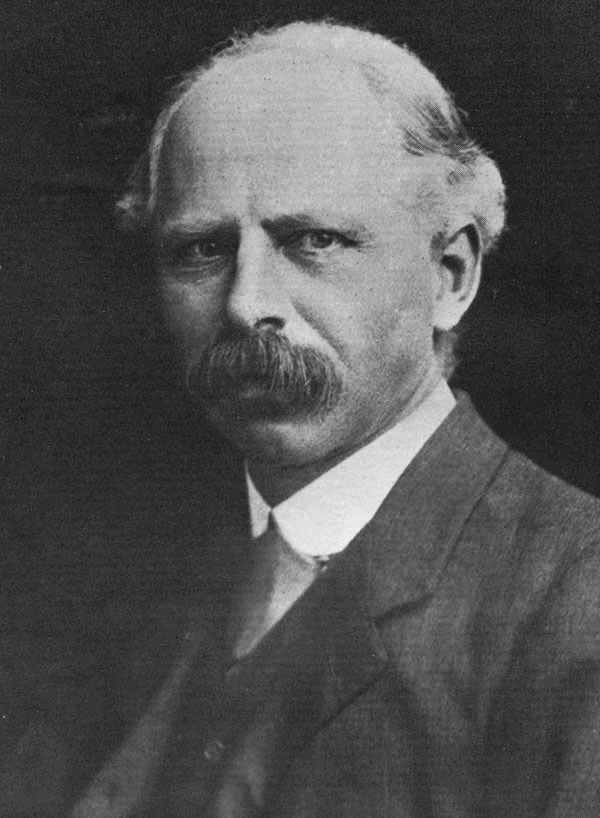
Leonard Hobhouse was one of the originators of social liberalism, notably through his book Liberalism, published in 1911.

By the end of the 19th century, downturns in economic growth challenged the principles of classical liberalism, a growing awareness of poverty and unemployment present within modern industrial cities, and the agitation of organised labour. A significant political reaction against the changes introduced by industrialisation and laissez-faire capitalism came from one-nation conservatives concerned about social balance and the introduction of the famous Education Act 1870. However, socialism later became a more important force for change and reform. Some Victorian writers—including Charles Dickens, Thomas Carlyle and Matthew Arnold—became early influential critics of social injustice.

John Stuart Mill contributed enormously to liberal thought by combining elements of classical liberalism with what eventually became known as the new liberalism. Mill developed this philosophy by liberalising the concept of consequentialism to promote a rights based system. He also developed his liberal dogma by combining the idea of using a utilitarian foundation to base upon the idea of individual rights. The new liberals tried to adapt the old language of liberalism to confront these difficult circumstances, which they believed could only be resolved through a broader and more interventionist conception of the state. Ensuring that individuals did not physically interfere with each other or merely by impartially having formulated and applied laws could not establish an equal right to liberty. More positive and proactive measures were required to ensure that every individual would have an equal opportunity for success.

==== New Liberals ====
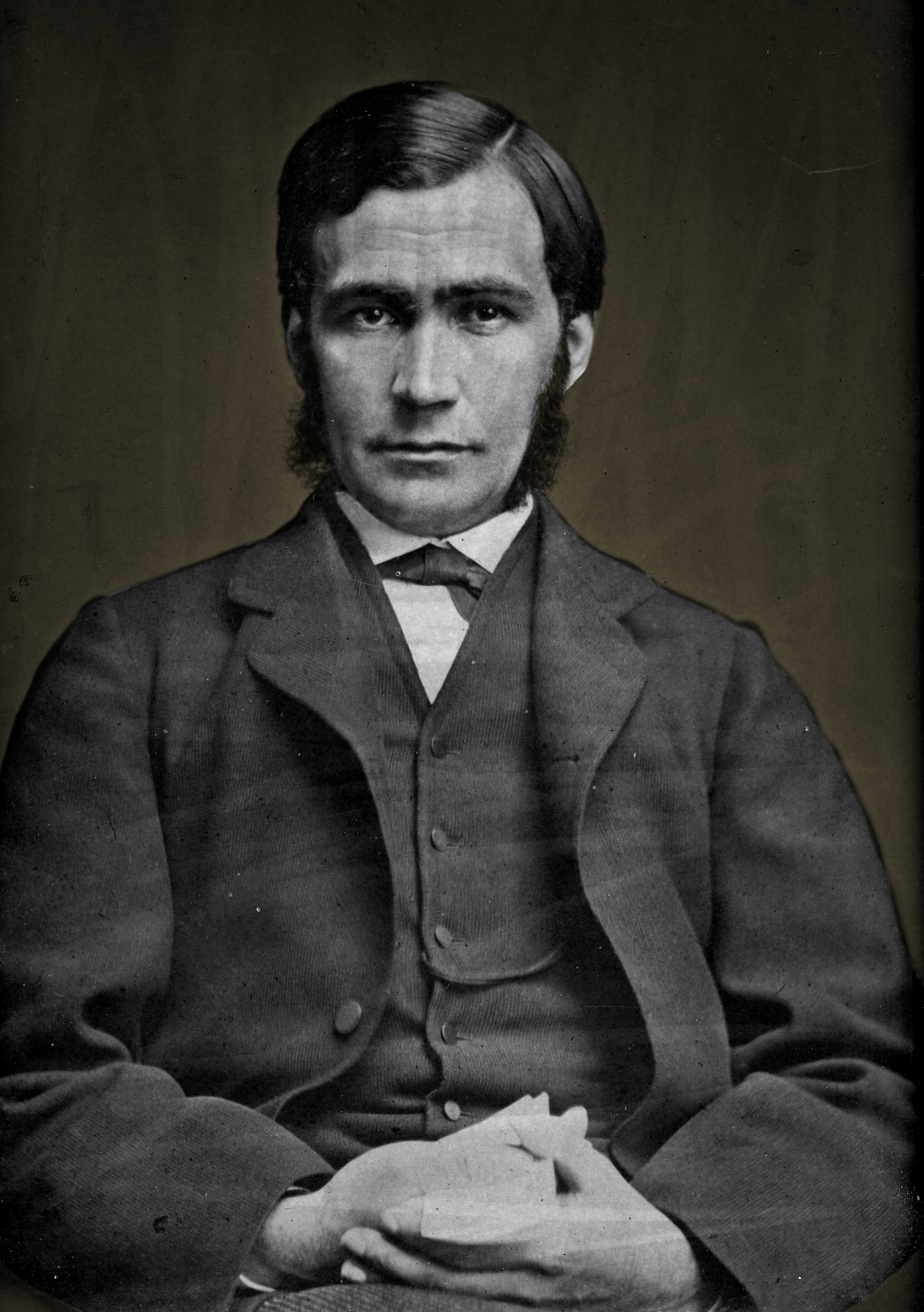
Thomas Hill Green

In the late 19th and early 20th centuries, a group of British thinkers known as the New Liberals made a case against laissez-faire classical liberalism. It argued in favour of state intervention in social, economic and cultural life. What they proposed is now called social liberalism. The New Liberals, including intellectuals Thomas Hill Green, Leonard Hobhouse and John A. Hobson, saw individual liberty achievable only under favourable social and economic circumstances. In their view, the poverty, squalor, and ignorance in which many people lived made it impossible for freedom and individuality to flourish. New Liberals believed through collective action coordinated by a strong, welfare-oriented and interventionist state could alleviate these conditions.

The Liberal governments of Henry Campbell-Bannerman and H. H. Asquith, mainly thanks to Chancellor of the Exchequer and later Prime Minister David Lloyd George, established the foundations of the welfare state in the United Kingdom before World War I. The comprehensive welfare state built in the United Kingdom after World War II, although primarily accomplished by the Labour Party's Attlee ministry, was significantly designed by two Liberals, namely John Maynard Keynes (who laid the foundations in economics with the Keynesian Revolution) and William Beveridge (whose Beveridge Report was used to design the welfare system).

Historian Peter Weiler has argued:

Although still partially informed by older Liberal concerns for character, self-reliance, and the capitalist market, this legislation nevertheless marked a significant shift in Liberal approaches to the state and social reform, approaches that later governments would slowly expand and that would grow into the welfare state after the Second World War. What was new in these reforms was the underlying assumption that the state could be a positive force, that the measure of individual freedom ... was not how much the state left people alone, but whether he gave them the capacity to fulfill themselves as individuals.

=== Germany ===
The term "Social Liberalism" may have first been employed by Max Stirner in his primary work, The Ego and its Own, used to ridicule Socialism.

In 1860s Germany, left-liberal politicians like Max Hirsch, Franz Duncker, and Hermann Schulze-Delitzsch established the Hirsch-Duncker trade unions—modelled on their British counterparts—to help workers improve working and economic conditions through reconciliation of interests and cooperation with their employers rather than class struggle. Schulze-Delitzsch is also the founding father of the German cooperative movement and the organiser of the world's first credit unions. Some liberal economists, such as Lujo Brentano or Gerhart von Schulze-Gävernitz, established the Verein für Socialpolitik (German Economic Association) in 1873 to promote social reform based on the historical school of economics and therefore rejecting classical economics, proposing a third way between Manchester Liberalism and socialist revolution in the 1871-founded German Empire.

However, the German left-liberal movement fragmented into wings and new parties over the 19th century. The main objectives of the left-liberal parties—the German Progress Party and its successors—were free speech, freedom of assembly, representative government, secret and equal but obligation-tied suffrage, and protection of private property. At the same time, they were strongly opposed to creating a welfare state, which they called state socialism. The main differences between the left-liberal parties were:

- The national ambitions.
- The different substate people's goals.
- Free trade against Schutzzollpolitik.
- The building of the national economy.

The term social liberalism (German: Sozialliberalismus) was used first in 1891 by Austria-Hungarian economist and journalist Theodor Hertzka. (Note: Hertzka was from Pest, part of Budapest, now the capital of Hungary. At the time of his birth, Hungary was the territory of the Austrian Empire.) Subsequently, in 1893, the historian and social reformer Ignaz Jastrow also used this term and joined the German Economic Association. He published the socialist democratic manifesto "Social-liberal: Tasks for Liberalism in Prussia" to create an "action group" for the general people's welfare in the Social Democratic Party of Germany, which they rejected.

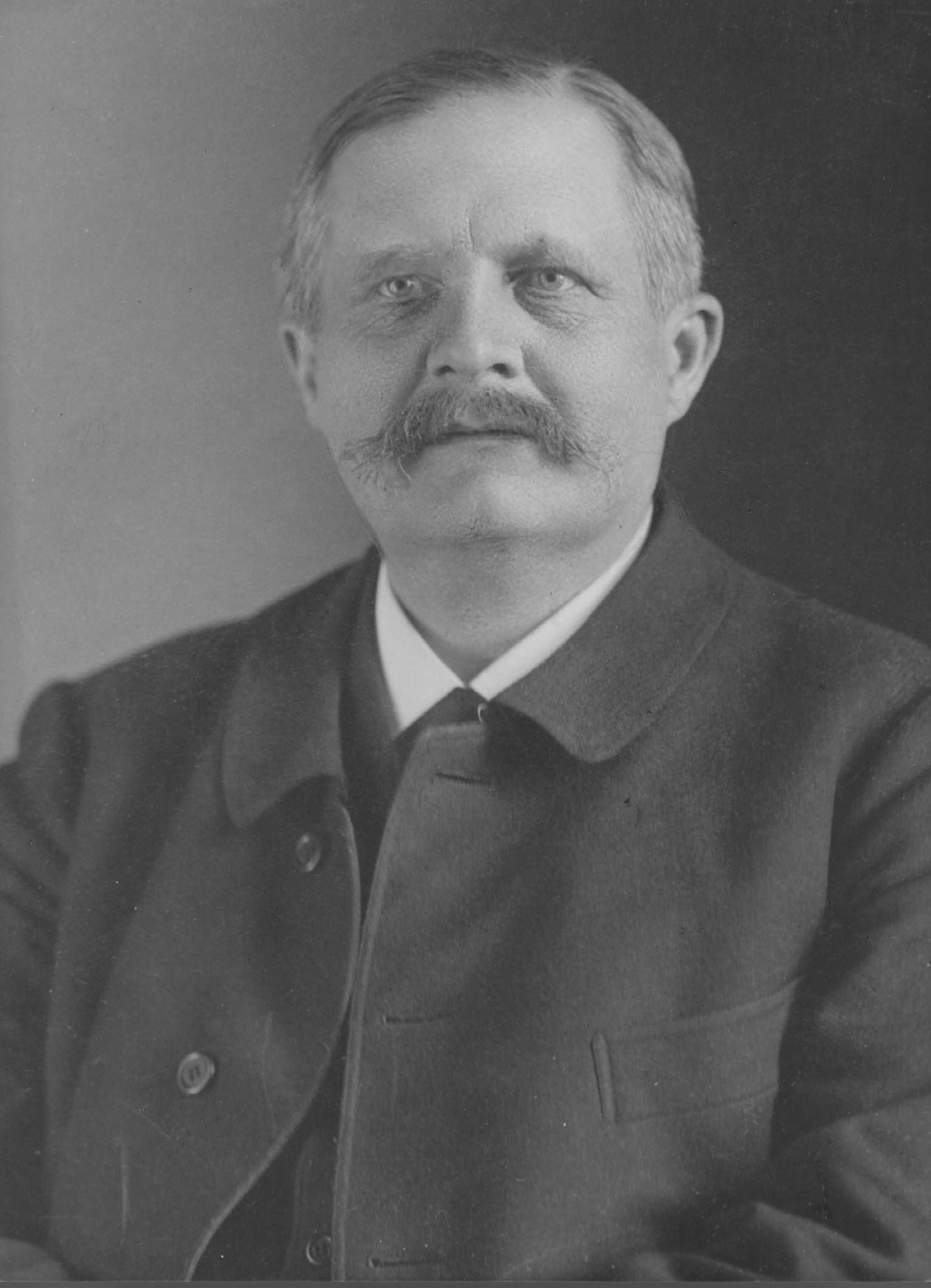
Friedrich Naumann

The National-Social Association, founded by the Protestant pastor Friedrich Naumann also maintained contacts with the left liberals. He tried to draw workers away from Marxism by proposing a mix of nationalism and Protestant-Christian-value-inflected social liberalism to overcome class antagonisms by non-revolutionary means. Naumann called this a "proletarian-bourgeois integral liberalism". Although the party could not win any seats and soon dissolved, he remained influential in theoretical German left-liberalism.

In the Weimar Republic, the German Democratic Party was founded and came into an inheritance of the left-liberal past and had a leftist social wing and a rightist economic wing but heavily favoured the democratic constitution over a monarchist one. Its ideas of a socially balanced economy with solidarity, duty, and rights among all workers struggled due to the economic sanctions of the Treaty of Versailles, but it influenced local cooperative enterprises.

After 1945, the Free Democrats included most of the social liberals, including Naumann and Brentano disciple Theodor Heuss who became the first party chairman and the first Federal President of West Germany. Other social liberals joined the Christian Democratic Union of Germany. Until the 1960s, post-war ordoliberalism was the model for Germany. It had a theoretical social liberal influence based on duty and rights.

During the 1950s and 1960s, the Free Democratic Party was dominated by conservative liberals, national liberals and classical liberals. However, in the 1970s, the party was briefly influenced by progressive and social liberal ideas which culminated in the 1971 Freiburg Thesis programme. Among other things, the party committed itself to "self-determination", "democratization of society", a "reform of capitalism" and a form of ecoliberalism which prioritized "environmental protection over profit and personal gains". In 1977, the social liberal era came to an end with the more economically liberal Kiel Thesis programme (Kieler Thesen) effectively setting the party back on a classical liberal course.

As the Free Democrats discarded social liberal ideas in a more conservative and economically liberal approach, some members left the party and formed the social liberal Liberal Democrats in 1982. Other social liberals have found a new home in Germany's Green party Alliance 90/The Greens.

=== France ===
In France, solidaristic thinkers, including Alfred Fouillée and Émile Durkheim, developed the social-liberal theory in the Third Republic. Sociology inspired them, and they influenced radical politicians like Léon Bourgeois. They explained that a more extensive division of labour caused more opportunity and individualism and inspired more complex interdependence. They argued that the individual had a debt to society, promoting progressive taxation to support public works and welfare schemes. However, they wanted the state to coordinate rather than manage, encouraging cooperative insurance schemes among individuals. Their main objective was to remove barriers to social mobility rather than create a welfare state.

=== United States ===
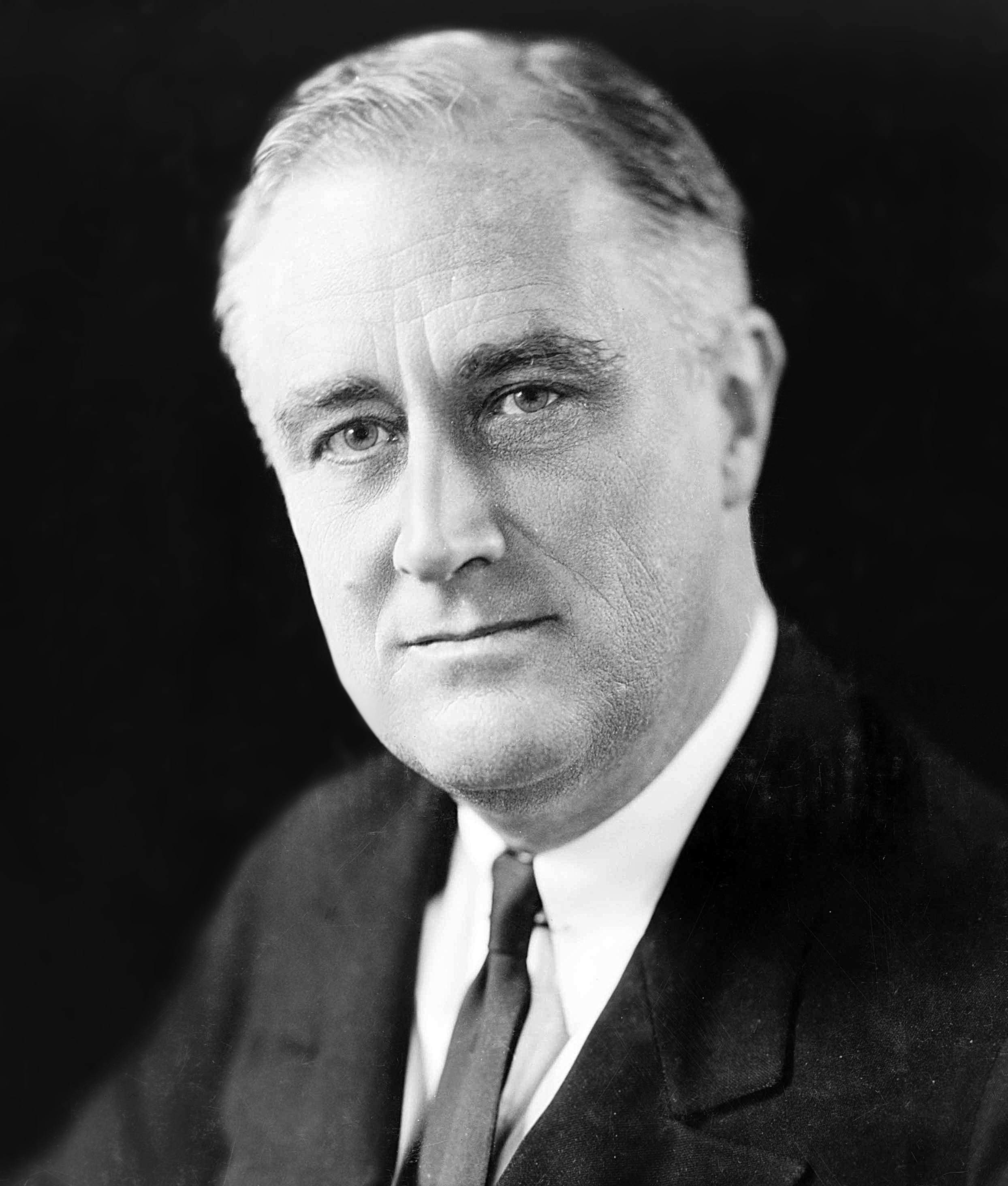
Franklin D. Roosevelt, the 32nd President of the United States, whose New Deal domestic policies defined American liberalism for the middle third of the 20th century

Social liberalism was a term in the United States to differentiate it from classical liberalism or laissez-faire. It dominated political and economic thought for several years until the word branched off from it around the Great Depression and the New Deal. In the 1870s and the 1880s, the American economists Richard Ely, John Bates Clark, and Henry Carter Adams—influenced both by socialism and the Evangelical Protestant movement—castigated the conditions caused by industrial factories and expressed sympathy toward labour unions. However, none developed a systematic political philosophy, and they later abandoned their flirtations with socialist thinking. In 1883, Lester Frank Ward published the two-volume Dynamic Sociology. He formalized the basic tenets of social liberalism while at the same time attacking the laissez-faire policies advocated by Herbert Spencer and William Graham Sumner. The historian Henry Steele Commager ranked Ward alongside William James, John Dewey, and Oliver Wendell Holmes Jr. and called him the father of the modern welfare state. A writer from 1884 until the 1930s, John Dewey—an educator influenced by Hobhouse, Green, and Ward—advocated socialist methods to achieve liberal goals. John Dewey's expanding popularity as an economist also coincided with the greater Georgist movement that rose in the 1910s, pinnacling with the presidency of Woodrow Wilson. America later incorporated some social liberal ideas into the New Deal, which developed as a response to the Great Depression when Franklin D. Roosevelt came into office.

== Implementation ==
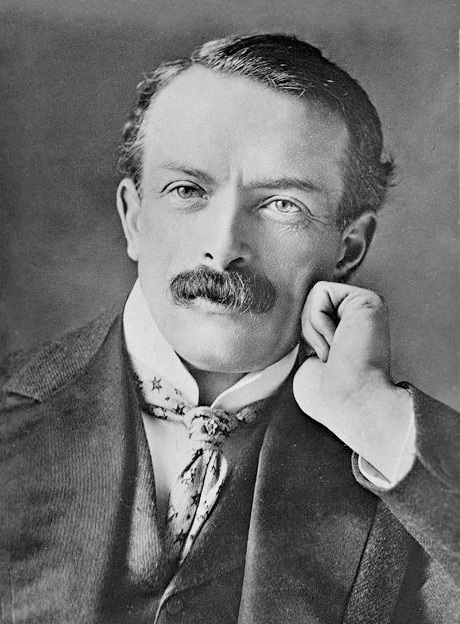
David Lloyd George, who became closely associated with this new liberalism and vigorously supported expanding social welfare

The welfare state grew gradually and unevenly from the late 19th century but fully developed following World War II, along with the mixed market economy and general welfare capitalism. Also called embedded liberalism, social liberal policies gained broad support across the political spectrum because they reduced society's disruptive and polarizing tendencies without challenging the capitalist economic system. Businesses accepted social liberalism in the face of widespread dissatisfaction with the boom and bust cycle of the earlier financial system as it seemed to them to be a lesser evil than more left-wing modes of government. Characteristics of social liberalism were cooperation between big business, government, and labour unions. Governments could assume a vital role because the wartime economy had strengthened their power, but the extent to which this occurred varied considerably among Western democracies. Social liberalism is also a generally internationalist ideology. Social liberalism has also historically been an advocate for liberal feminism among other forms of social progress.

Social liberals tend to find a compromise between the perceived extremes of unrestrained capitalism and state socialism to create an economy built on regulated capitalism. Due to a reliance on what they believe to be a too centralized government to achieve its goals, critics have called this strain of liberalism a more authoritarian ideological position compared to the original schools of liberal thought, especially in the United States, where conservatives have called presidents Franklin D. Roosevelt and Lyndon B. Johnson authoritarians.

=== United Kingdom ===
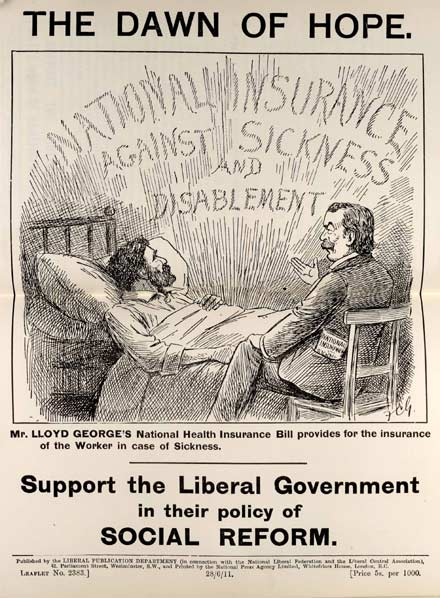
British leaflet from the Liberal Party expressing support for the National Insurance Act 1911 and the legislation provided benefits to sick and unemployed workers, marking a major milestone in the development of social welfare

The first notable implementation of social liberal policies occurred under the Liberal Party in Britain from 1906 until 1914. These initiatives became known as the Liberal welfare reforms. The main elements included pensions for poor older adults, and health, sickness, and unemployment insurance. These changes were accompanied by progressive taxation, particularly in the People's Budget of 1909. The old system of charity relying on the Poor Laws and supplemented by private charity, public cooperatives, and private insurance companies was in crisis, giving the state added impetus for reform. The Liberal Party caucus elected in 1906 also contained more professionals, including academics and journalists, sympathetic to social liberalism. The large business owners had mostly deserted the Liberals for the Conservatives, the latter becoming the favourite party for commercial interests. Both business interests and trade unions regularly opposed the reforms. Liberals most identified with these reforms were Prime Minister H. H. Asquith, John Maynard Keynes, David Lloyd George (especially as Chancellor of the Exchequer), and Winston Churchill (as President of the Board of Trade), in addition to the civil servant (and later Liberal MP) William Beveridge.

Most of the social democratic parties in Europe (including the British Labour Party) have taken on strong influences of social liberal ideology. Despite Britain's two major parties coming from the traditions of socialism and conservatism, the most substantive political and economic debates of recent times were between social liberal and classical liberal concepts.

=== Germany ===
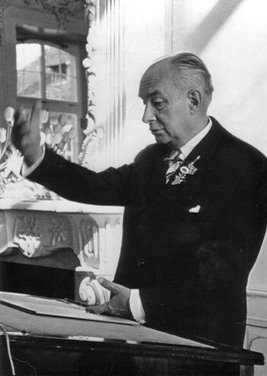
Alexander Rüstow

Alexander Rüstow, a German economist, first proposed the German variant of economically social liberalism. In 1932, he dubbed this kind of social liberalism neoliberalism while speaking at the Social Policy Association. However, that term now carries a meaning different from the one proposed by Rüstow. Rüstow wanted an alternative to socialism and the classical liberal economics developed in the German Empire. In 1938, Rüstow met with various economic thinkers—including Ludwig Mises, Friedrich Hayek, and Wilhelm Röpke—to determine how and what could renew liberalism. Rüstow advocated a powerful state to enforce free markets and state intervention to correct market failures. However, Mises argued that monopolies and cartels operated because of state intervention and protectionism and claimed that the only legitimate role for the state was to abolish barriers to market entry. He viewed Rüstow's proposals as negating market freedom and saw them as similar to socialism.

Following World War II, the West German government adopted Rüstow's neoliberalism, now usually called ordoliberalism or the social market economy, under Ludwig Erhard. He was the Minister of Economics and later became Chancellor. Erhard lifted price controls and introduced free markets. While Germany's post-war economic recovery was due to these policies, the welfare state—which Bismarck had established—became increasingly costly.

=== Turkey ===
The Kemalist economic model was designed by Mustafa Kemal Atatürk in 1930s, founder of the Republic of Turkey, after an unsuccessful attempt to embrace a regulated market economy from İzmir Economic Congress until the 1929 Depression. He put the principle of "etatism" in his Six Arrows and stated that etatism was a unique economic system for Turkey and that it was different from socialism, communism, and collectivism. Atatürk explained his economic idea as follows:

State can't take the place of individuals, but, it must take into consideration the individuals to make them improve and develop theirselves. Etatism includes the work that individuals won't do because they can't make profit or the work which are necessary for national interests. Just as it is the duty of the state to protect the freedom and independence of the country and to regulate internal affairs, the state must take care of the education and health of its citizens. The state must take care of the roads, railways, telegraphs, telephones, animals of the country, all kinds of vehicles and the general wealth of the nation to protect the peace and security of the country. During the administration and protection of the country, the things we just counted are more important than cannons, rifles and all kinds of weapons. (...) Private interests are generally the opposite of the general interests. Also, private interests are based on rivalries. But, you can't create a stable economy only with this. People who think like that are delusional and they will be a failure. (...) And, work of an individual must stay as the main basis of economic growth. Not preventing an individual's work and not obstructing the individual's freedom and enterprise with the state's own activities is the main basis of the principle of democracy.

Moreover, Atatürk said this in his opening speech on 1 November 1937: "Unless there is an absolute necessity, the markets can't be intervened; also, no markets can be completely free." Also it was said by İsmet İnönü that Atatürk's principle of etatism was Keynesian and a Turkish variant of New Deal.

=== Rest of Europe ===
The post-war governments of other countries in Western Europe also followed social liberal policies. These policies were implemented primarily by Christian democrats and social democrats as liberal parties in Europe declined in strength from their peak in the 19th century.

=== United States ===
American political discourse resisted this social turn in European liberalism. While the economic policies of the New Deal appeared Keynesian, there was no revision of liberal theory in favour of more significant state initiatives. Even though the United States lacked an effective socialist movement, New Deal policies often appeared radical and were attacked by the right. American liberalism would eventually evolve into a more anti-communist ideology as a result. American exceptionalism was likely the reason for the separate development of modern liberalism in the United States, which kept mainstream American ideology within a narrow range.

John Rawls' principal work, A Theory of Justice (1971), can be considered a flagship exposition of social liberal thinking, noted for its use of analytic philosophy and advocating the combination of individual freedom and a fairer distribution of resources. According to Rawls, every individual should be allowed to choose and pursue their conception of what is desirable. At the same time, the greater society must maintain a socially just distribution of goods. Rawls argued that differences in material wealth are tolerable if general economic growth and wealth also benefit the poorest. A Theory of Justice countered utilitarian thinking in the tradition of Jeremy Bentham, instead following the Kantian concept of a social contract, picturing society as a mutual agreement between rational citizens, producing rights and duties as well as establishing and defining roles and tasks of the state. Rawls put the equal liberty principle in the first place, providing every person with equal access to the same set of fundamental liberties, followed by the fair equality of opportunity and difference, thus allowing social and economic inequalities under the precondition that privileged positions are accessible to everyone, that everyone has equal opportunities and that even the least advantaged members of society benefit from this framework. This framework repeated itself in the equation of Justice as Fairness. Rawls proposed these principles not just to adherents of liberalism but as a basis for all democratic politics, regardless of ideology. The work advanced social liberal ideas immensely within the 1970s political and philosophic academia. Rawls may therefore be a "patron saint" of social liberalism.

== Decline ==
Following economic problems in the 1960s and 1970s, liberal thought underwent some transformation. Keynesian financial management faced criticism for interfering with the free market. At the same time, increased welfare spending funded by higher taxes prompted fears of lower investment, lower consumer spending, and the creation of a "dependency culture." Trade unions often caused high wages and industrial disruption, while total employment was considered unsustainable. Writers such as Milton Friedman and Samuel Brittan, whom Friedrich Hayek influenced, advocated a reversal of social liberalism. Their policies—often called neoliberalism—had a significant influence on Western politics, most notably on the governments of United Kingdom Prime Minister Margaret Thatcher and the United States President Ronald Reagan. They pursued policies of deregulation of the economy and reduction in spending on social services.

Part of the reason for the collapse of the social liberal coalition was a challenge in the 1960s and 1970s from financial interests that could operate independently of national governments. A related reason was the comparison of ideas such as socialized medicine, advocated by politicians such as Franklin D. Roosevelt, facing criticisms and being dubbed as socialist by conservatives during the midst of the Red Scare, notably by the previously mentioned Reagan. Another cause was the decline of organized labour which had formed part of the coalition but was also a support for left-wing ideologies challenging the liberal consensus. Related to this were the downfall of working-class consciousness and the growth of the middle class. The push by the United States and the United Kingdom, which had been least accepting of social liberalism for trade liberalization, further eroded support.

== Contemporary revival of social liberal thought ==
From the end of the 20th century, at the same time that it was losing political influence, social liberalism experienced an intellectual revival with several substantial authors, including John Rawls (political philosophy), Amartya Sen (philosophy and economy), Ronald Dworkin (philosophy of law), Martha Nussbaum (philosophy), Bruce Ackerman (constitutional law), and others.

== Parties and organisations ==
In Europe, social liberal parties tend to be small or medium-sized centrist and centre-left parties. Examples of successful European social liberal parties participating in government coalitions at national or regional levels include the Liberal Democrats in the United Kingdom, the Democrats 66 in the Netherlands, and the Danish Social Liberal Party. In continental European politics, social liberal parties are integrated into the Renew Europe group in the European Parliament, the fifth biggest group in the parliament, and includes social liberal parties, market liberal parties, and centrist parties. Other groups such as the European People's Party, the Greens–European Free Alliance, and the Progressive Alliance of Socialists and Democrats also house some political parties with social-liberal factions.

In North America, social liberalism (as Europe would refer to it) tends to be the dominant form of liberalism present, so in common parlance, "liberal" refers to social liberals. In Canada, social liberalism is held by the Liberal Party of Canada, while in the United States, social liberalism is a significant force within the Democratic Party.

Giving an exhaustive list of social liberal parties worldwide is difficult, mainly because political organisations are not always ideologically pure, and party ideologies often change over time. However, peers such as the Africa Liberal Network, the Alliance of Liberals and Democrats for Europe Party, the Council of Asian Liberals and Democrats, the European Liberal Forum, the Liberal International, and the Liberal Network for Latin America or scholars usually accept them as parties who are following social liberalism as a core ideology.

=== Social liberal parties or parties with social liberal factions ===
Social liberal political parties that are more left-biased than general centre-left parties are not described here. (See list of progressive parties)

Country	Name	Ref
Åland	Liberals for Åland	
Andorra	Action for Andorra	
Argentina	Radical Civic Union	
Australia	Liberal Party of Australia (factions)	
Australia	Australian Labor Party (factions)	
Bahamas	Progressive Liberal Party	
Belgium	DéFI	
Belgium	Party for Freedom and Progress	
Belgium	Vivant	
Bosnia and Herzegovina	Our Party	
Brazil	Cidadania	
Brazil	Brazilian Social Democracy Party	
Brazil	Brazilian Socialist Party	
Canada	Liberal Party of Canada	
Chile	Radical Party of Chile, Liberal Party of Chile	
Croatia	Croatian People's Party – Liberal Democrats	
Croatia	Centre	
Croatia	Civic Liberal Alliance	
Croatia	Istrian Democratic Assembly	
Czech Republic	Czech Pirate Party	
Denmark	Danish Social Liberal Party	
Egypt	Constitution Party	
Estonia	Estonian Centre Party	
Estonia	Estonian Greens	
Estonia	Estonia 200	
European Union	Volt Europa	
Faroe Islands	Self-Government Party	
Finland	Centre Party	
Finland	Green League	
Finland	National Coalition Party	
Finland	Swedish People's Party of Finland	
France	Renaissance	
France	Radical Party of the Left	
France	Territories of Progress	
France	The New Democrats	
Georgia (country)	Freedom Square	
Germany	Liberal Democrats	
Germany	Free Democratic Party (factions)	
Germany	Social Democratic Party of Germany (factions)	(Note: Majority of the SPD politicians with social liberal ideology are members of Seeheimer Kreis wing)
Germany	Alliance 90/The Greens (factions)	
Greenland	Democrats	
Hungary	Democratic Coalition	
Iceland	Bright Future	
India	Indian National Congress	
Indonesia	Indonesian Democratic Party of Struggle	
Israel	Israel Resilience Party	
Israel	Yesh Atid	
Italy	Democratic Party (factions)	
Italy	Italia Viva	
Italy	Italian Republican Party	
Italy	Action	
Japan	Constitutional Democratic Party of Japan	
Kosovo	Democratic Party of Kosovo	
Latvia	Development/For!	
Lesotho	Revolution for Prosperity	
Luxembourg	Democratic Party	
Malaysia	Democratic Action Party	
Malaysia	People's Justice Party	
Montenegro	Positive Montenegro	
Montenegro	United Reform Action	
Montenegro	Liberal Party	
Morocco	Citizens' Forces	
Myanmar	National League for Democracy	
Myanmar	National Democratic Force	
Netherlands	Democrats 66	
New Zealand	New Zealand Labour Party (factions)	
Norway	Liberal Party	
Philippines	Liberal Party	
Poland	Polish Initiative	
Poland	Your Movement	
Poland	Union of European Democrats	
Portugal	Together for the People	
Portugal	Liberal Initiative (faction)	
Romania	PRO Romania	
Romania	Save Romania Union	
Russia	Yabloko	
Serbia	Democratic Party	
Slovakia	Progressive Slovakia	
Slovenia	Freedom Movement	
South Africa	Democratic Alliance	
South Korea	Democratic Party of Korea	
South Korea	Justice Party	
Sweden	Liberals (factions)	
Sweden	Centre Party	
Switzerland	Social Democratic Party of Switzerland (faction)	
Taiwan	Democratic Progressive Party	
Taiwan	Taiwan People's Party	
Trinidad and Tobago	People's National Movement	
Turkey	Republican People's Party	
Turkey	New Party	
Turkey	Peoples' Equality and Democracy Party (factions)	
United Kingdom	Liberal Democrats	
United Kingdom	Liberal Party	
United States	Democratic Party	

=== Historical social liberal parties or parties with social liberal factions ===
- Andorra: Democratic Renewal
- Australia: Australian Democrats
- Belgium: Spirit (merged into Groen)
- Brazil: Social Liberal Party (Livres faction)
- France: Radical Movement
- Germany: Free-minded People's Party, German Democratic Party, German People's Party, Progressive People's Party
- Greece: The River
- Hungary: Alliance of Free Democrats
- Iceland: Liberal Party, Union of Liberals and Leftists
- Israel: Independent Liberals, Kulanu, Progressive Party
- Italy: Action Party, Radical Party, Italian Liberal Party, Democratic Alliance, Democratic Union, The Democrats
- Japan: Japan Socialist Party (factions), Democratic Party of Japan
- Latvia: Society for Political Change
- Lithuania: New Union (Social Liberals)
- Luxembourg: Radical Socialist Party
- Malta: Democratic Party
- Moldova: Our Moldova Alliance
- Netherlands: Free-thinking Democratic League
- Poland: Democratic Party – demokraci.pl, Spring,
- Russian: Constitutional Democratic Party
- Slovenia: Liberal Democracy of Slovenia, Zares, List of Marjan Šarec, Party of Alenka Bratušek
- South Korea: Progressive Party (1956), Uri Party, Grand Unified Democratic New Party
- Spain: Union, Progress and Democracy
- Switzerland: Ring of Independents
- United Kingdom: Liberal Party, Social Democratic Party

== Notable thinkers ==
Some notable scholars and politicians ordered by date of birth who are generally considered as having made significant contributions to the evolution of social liberalism as a political ideology include:

- Jeremy Bentham (1748–1832)
- John Stuart Mill
  (1806–1873)
- Thomas Hill Green (1836–1882)
- Lester Frank Ward (1841–1913)
- Lujo Brentano (1844–1931)
- Bernard Bosanquet (1848–1923)
- Woodrow Wilson (1856–1924)
- Émile Durkheim
  (1858–1917)
- John Atkinson Hobson (1858–1940)
- John Dewey (1859–1952)
- Friedrich Naumann
  (1860–1919)
- Gerhart von Schulze-Gävernitz
  (1864–1943)
- Leonard Trelawny Hobhouse
  (1864–1929)
- Tokuzō Fukuda (1874–1930)
- William Beveridge (1879–1963)
- Hans Kelsen (1881–1973)
- Mohammad Mossadegh (1882–1967)
- John Maynard Keynes
  (1883–1946)
- Franklin D. Roosevelt (1882–1945)
- Lester B. Pearson (1897–1972)
- Pierre Elliot Trudeau (1919–2000)
- Bertil Ohlin (1899–1979)
- Piero Gobetti (1901–1926)
- Karl Popper (1902–1994)
- Guido Calogero (1904–1986)
- Isaiah Berlin (1909–1997)
- Norberto Bobbio (1909–2004)
- Masao Maruyama (1914–1996)
- John Rawls (1921–2002)
- Don Chipp (1925–2006)
- Karl-Hermann Flach (1929–1973)
- Vlado Gotovac (1930–2000)
- Richard Rorty (1931–2007)
- Ronald Dworkin
  (1931–2013)
- Amartya Sen (born 1933)
- José G. Merquior (1941–1991)
- Bruce Ackerman (born 1943)
- Roh Moo-hyun (1946–2009)
- Martha Nussbaum (born 1947)
- Grigory Yavlinsky (born 1952)
- Paul Krugman (born 1953)
- Dirk Verhofstadt (born 1955)
- Justin Trudeau (born 1971)
- Robert Biedroń (born 1976)

== See also ==
- Liberal socialism – Political philosophy incorporating liberal principles to socialism
- Classical radicalism – Historical political movement within liberalism
- Colonial liberalism – 19th century Australian political movement
- Constitutional liberalism – Form of government
- Left-libertarianism – Political philosophy
- Liberalism by country
- Liberal parties by country
- Neo-libertarianism – Political ideology
- Social–liberal coalition – Governmental coalition in German politics
- Social market economy – Socio-economic model
- Woke – Political slang

== Sources ==
- Adams, Ian (2001). Political ideology today. Manchester: Manchester University Press, 2001. ISBN 0 7190 6019 2.
- De Ruggiero, Guido (1959). The History of European Liberalism. Boston: Beacon Press. ISBN 978-0844619705
- Faulks, Keith (1999). Political Sociology: A Critical Introduction. Edinburgh: Edinburgh University Press. ISBN 0 7486 1356 0.
- Feuchtwanger, E. J. (1985). Democracy and Empire: Britain 1865-1914. London: Edward Arnold Publishers Ltd. ISBN 0-7131-6162-0.
- Richardson, James L. (2001). Contending Liberalisms in World Politics. London: Lynne Rienner Publishers, Inc. ISBN 1-55587-915-2.
- Slomp, Hans (2000). European Politics Into the Twenty-first Century: Integration and Division. Westport: Praeger Publishers. ISBN 0-275-96814-6.
