= Alexander Duncker =

German publisher and bookseller

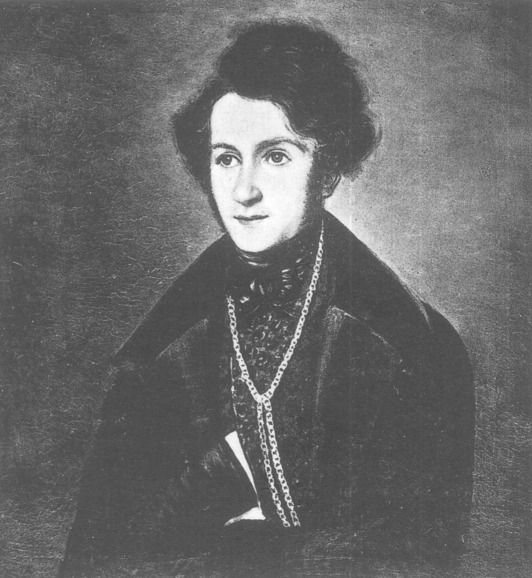
Alexander Duncker

Alexander Friedrich Wilhelm Duncker (February 18, 1813 – August 23, 1879) was a German publisher and bookseller.

== Life and family ==
He was born in Berlin, the son of Carl Friedrich Wilhelm Duncker (1781–1869) and Fanny Duncker (née Wolff), descending from a successful Berlin family of booksellers. His brothers included historian and politician Maximilian Duncker (1811–1886), and publisher and pundit Franz Duncker (1822–1888), founder of a trade union with labor economist Max Hirsch (1832–1905). Another brother, Hermann Carl Rudolf Duncker (1817–1892), was a member of the Prussian National Assembly and a mayor of Berlin.

Duncker's father had founded the publishing firm Duncker & Humblot in 1809, managing it alone after business partner Peter Humblot died in 1828. Alexander Duncker started his education in 1829. After apprenticeships with Friedrich Christoph Perthes and Johann Besser in Hamburg, Duncker founded his own firm, "Verlag Alexander Duncker". His firm specialized in Belles lettres (German: Belletristik) and visual arts. Among the authors he published were Thekla von Gumpert, Ida Hahn-Hahn, Paul Heyse, Karl von Holtei, August Kopisch, Fanny Lewald, Elise Polko, Christian Friedrich Scherenberg, Hermann von Pückler-Muskau, and Friedrich von Uechtriz. He was instrumental in promoting new authors. Some of them, such as Emanuel Geibel, Wilhelm Jensen, Marie Petersen, Gustav zu Putlitz, and Theodor Storm, found their first recognition through Duncker's efforts.

Duncker had far-reaching political connections and regularly corresponded with King Friedrich Wilhelm IV. Later, he maintained contact with Emperor William I. From 1841 he held the title "Royal Court Bookseller". As a reserve officer attaining the rank of lieutenant colonel, he participated in the wars against Denmark (1864), Austria (1866), and France (1870–71).

== Works ==
A high point in his output was a graphic collection of Prussian castles under the title, Die ländlichen Wohnsitze, Schlösser und Residenzen der ritterschaftlichen Grundbesitzer in der preussischen Monarchie nebst den königlichen Familien-, Haus-Fideicommiss- und Schatull-Gütern in naturgetreuen, künstlerisch ausgeführten, farbigen Darstellungen nebst begleitendem Text (in English: The rural residences, castles, and palaces of the knightly landowners in the Prussian monarchy, along with the royal families estates, fideicommissum estates, and private sovereign estates, depicted in lifelike, artistically executed, colorful illustrations with accompanying text) appearing from 1857 to 1883.

The series of 320 signatures in 16 volumes included 960 color lithographs measuring 20x15 cm. The collection is especially valuable for its pictorial record of numerous stately buildings from the old eastern German lands, many of which were destroyed during and after World War II, when these regions were transferred to Poland and the Soviet Union.

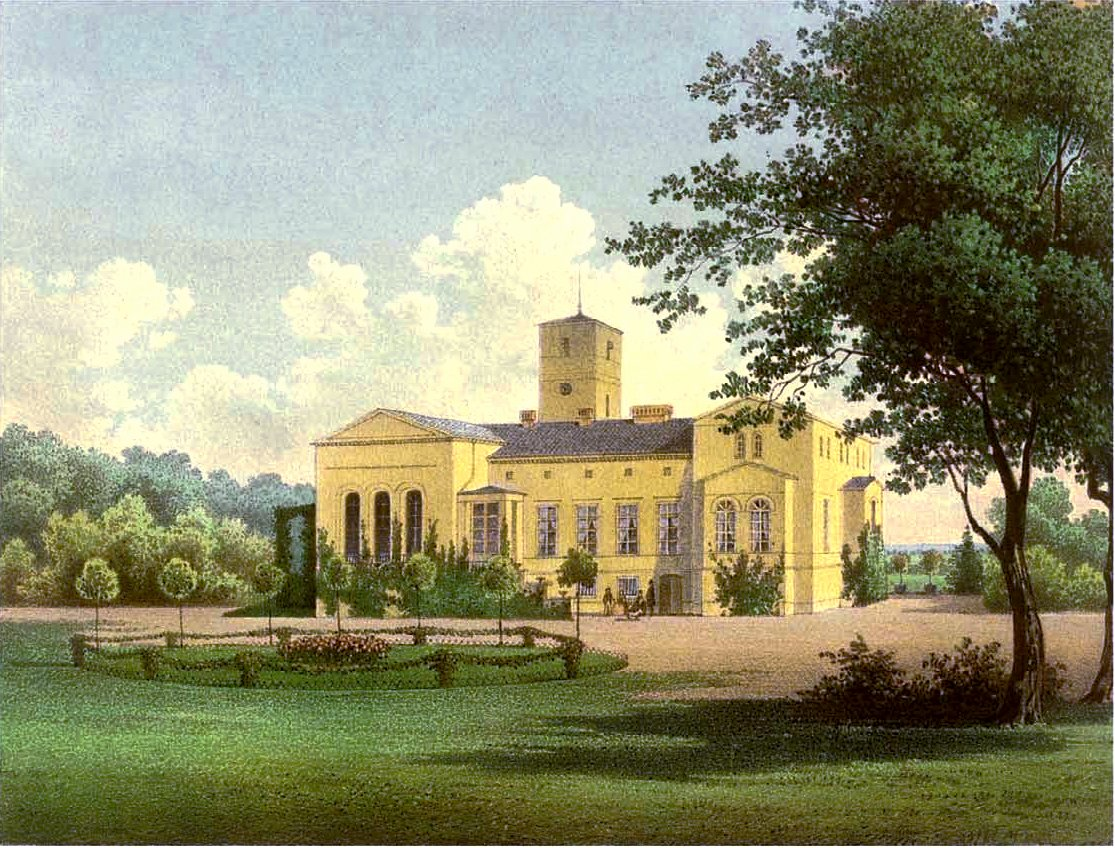
Manor of Glietz Brandebourg in 1865

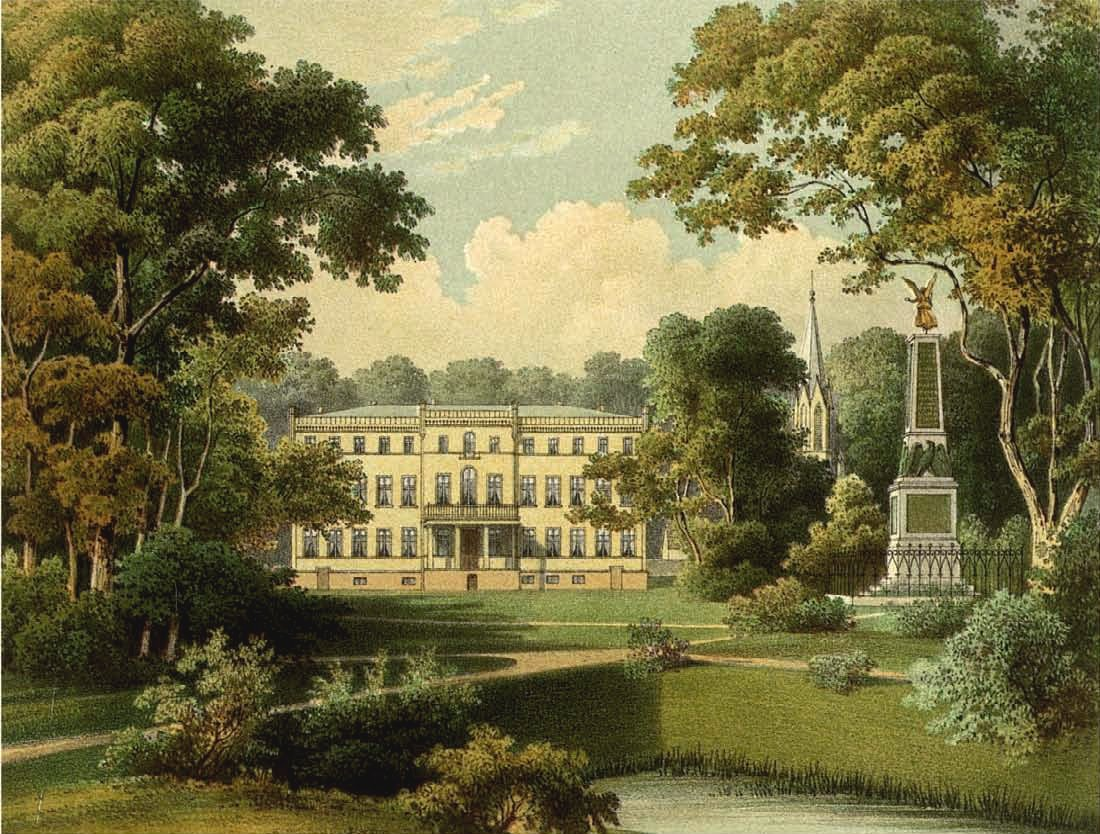
Tamsel

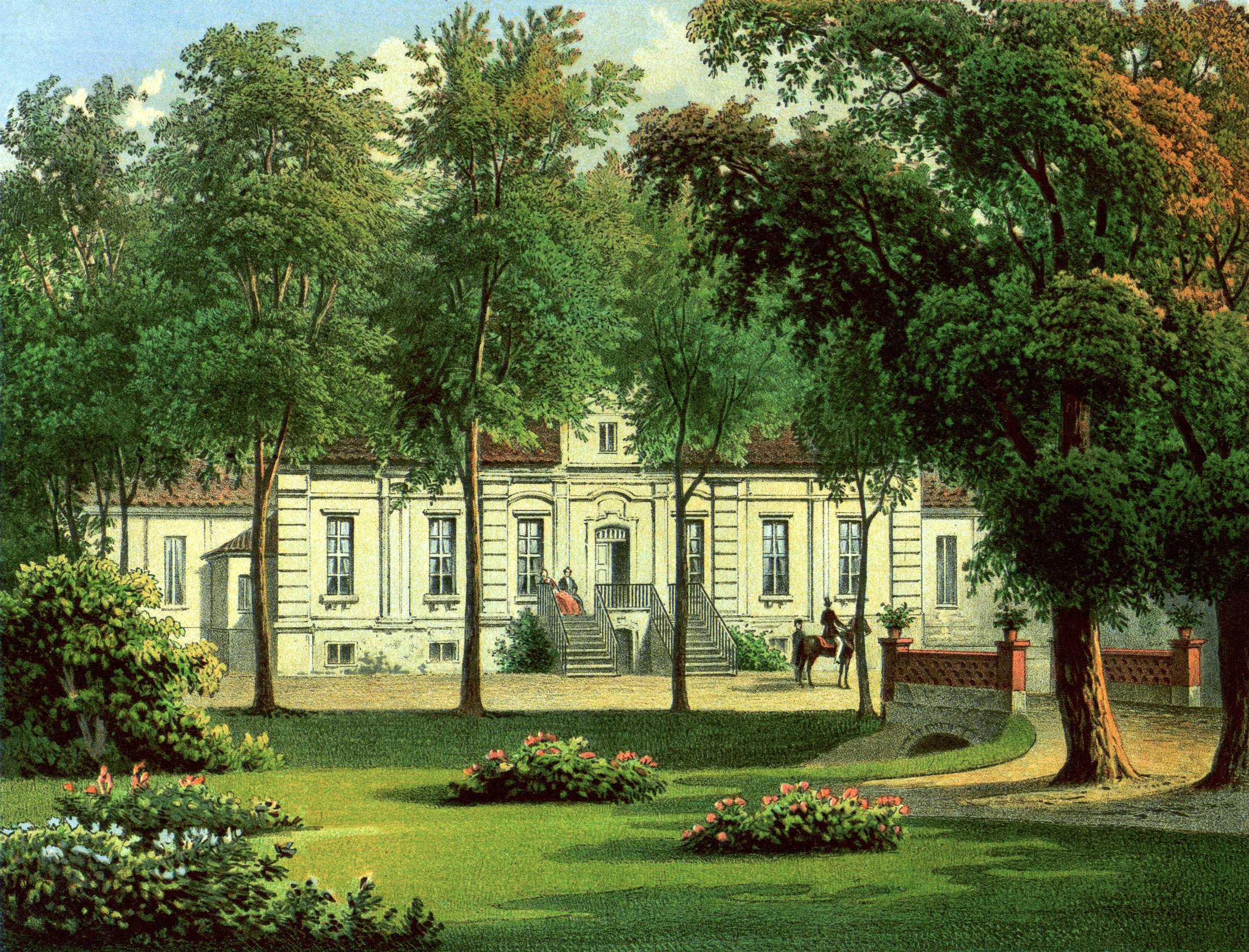
Fredersdorf Manor

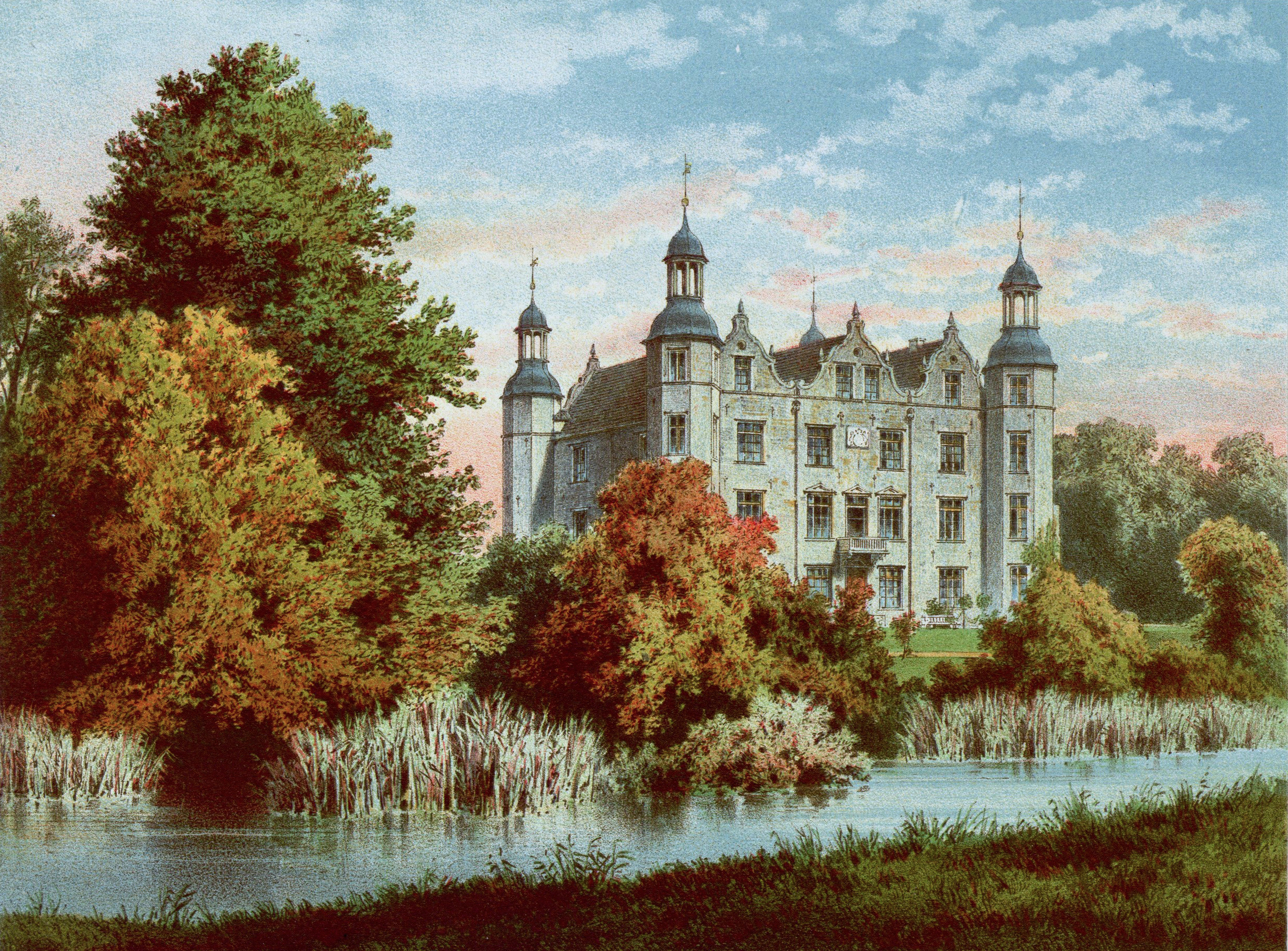
Ahrensburg in Schleswig-Holstein

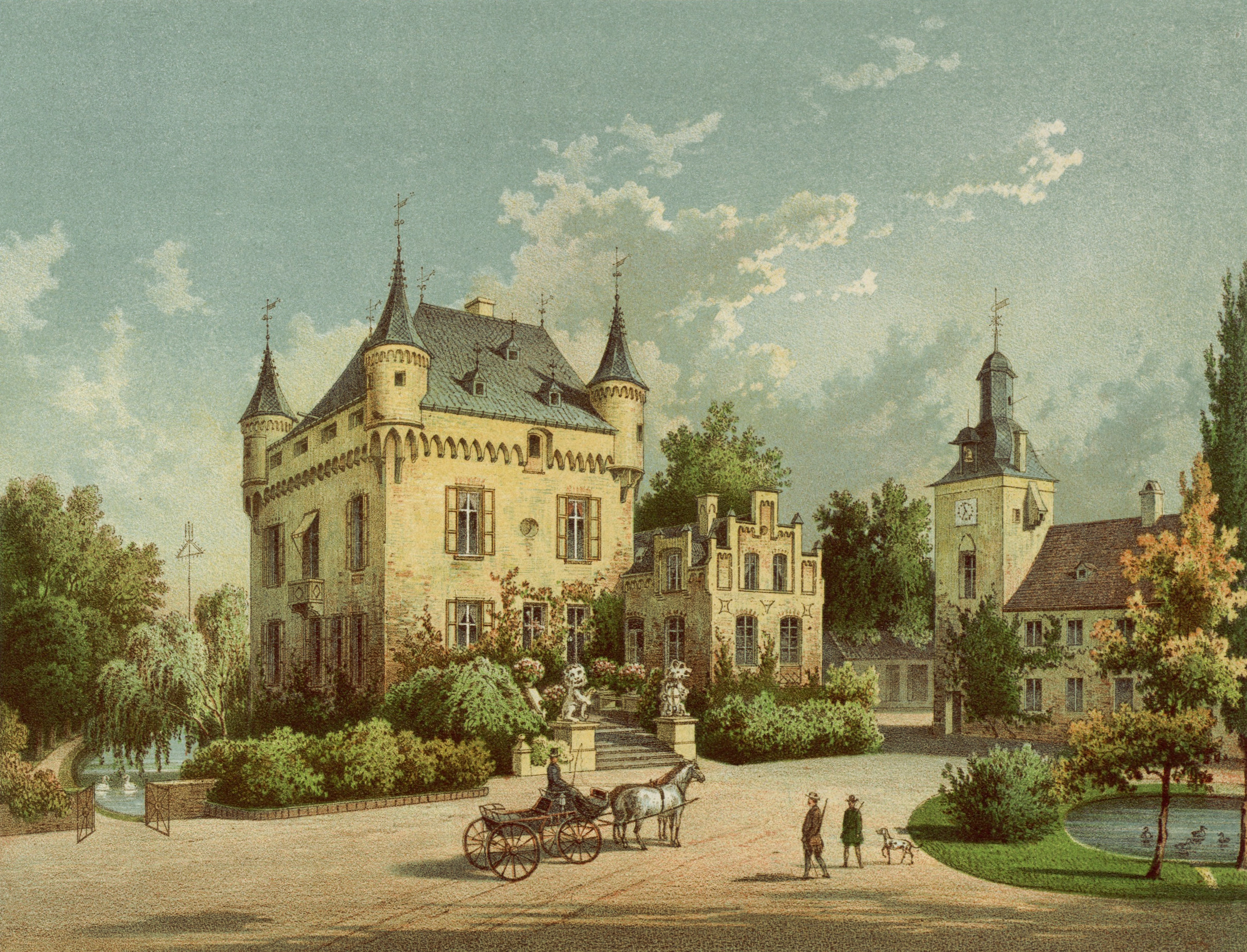
Lörsfeld Hall

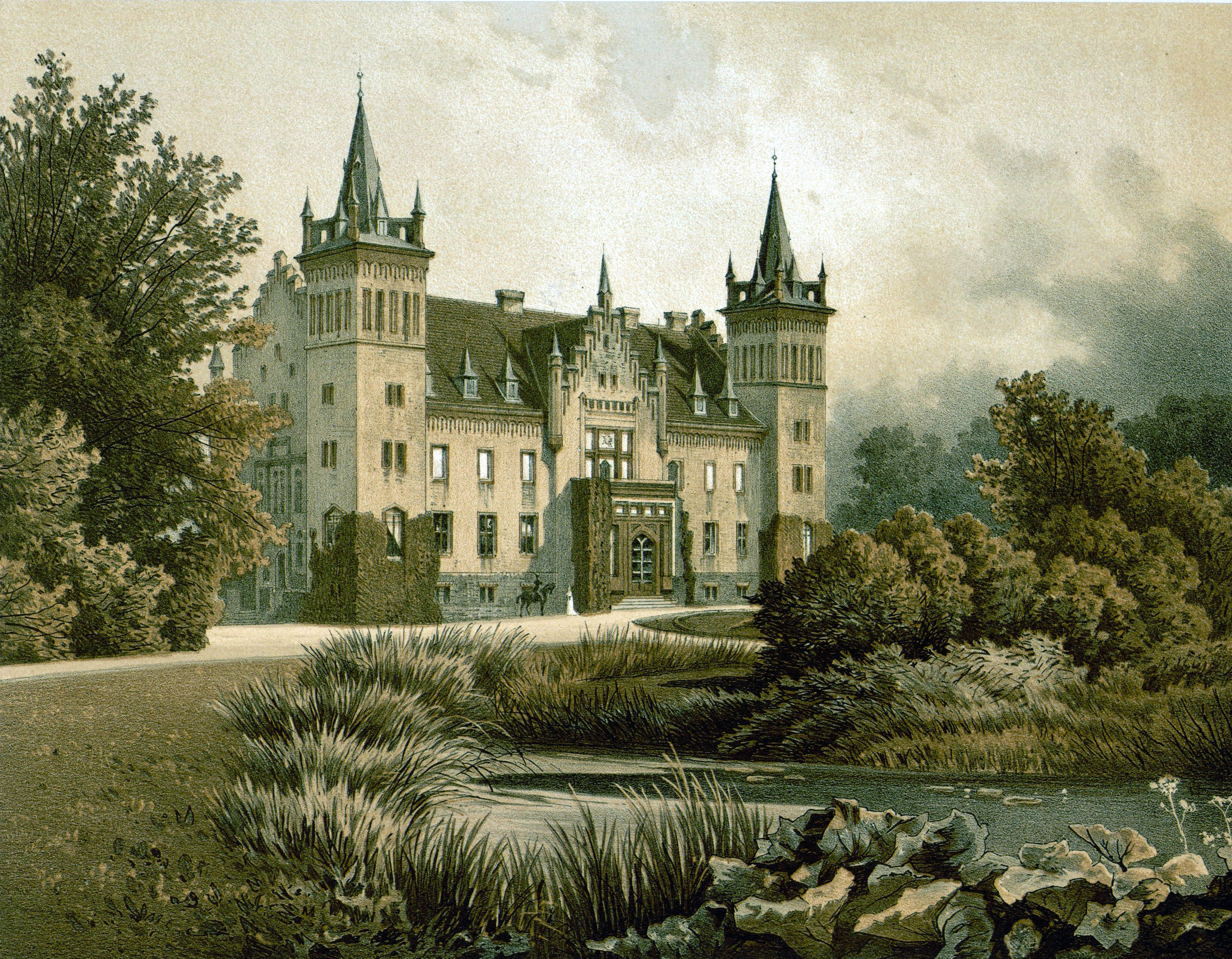
Rozbitek

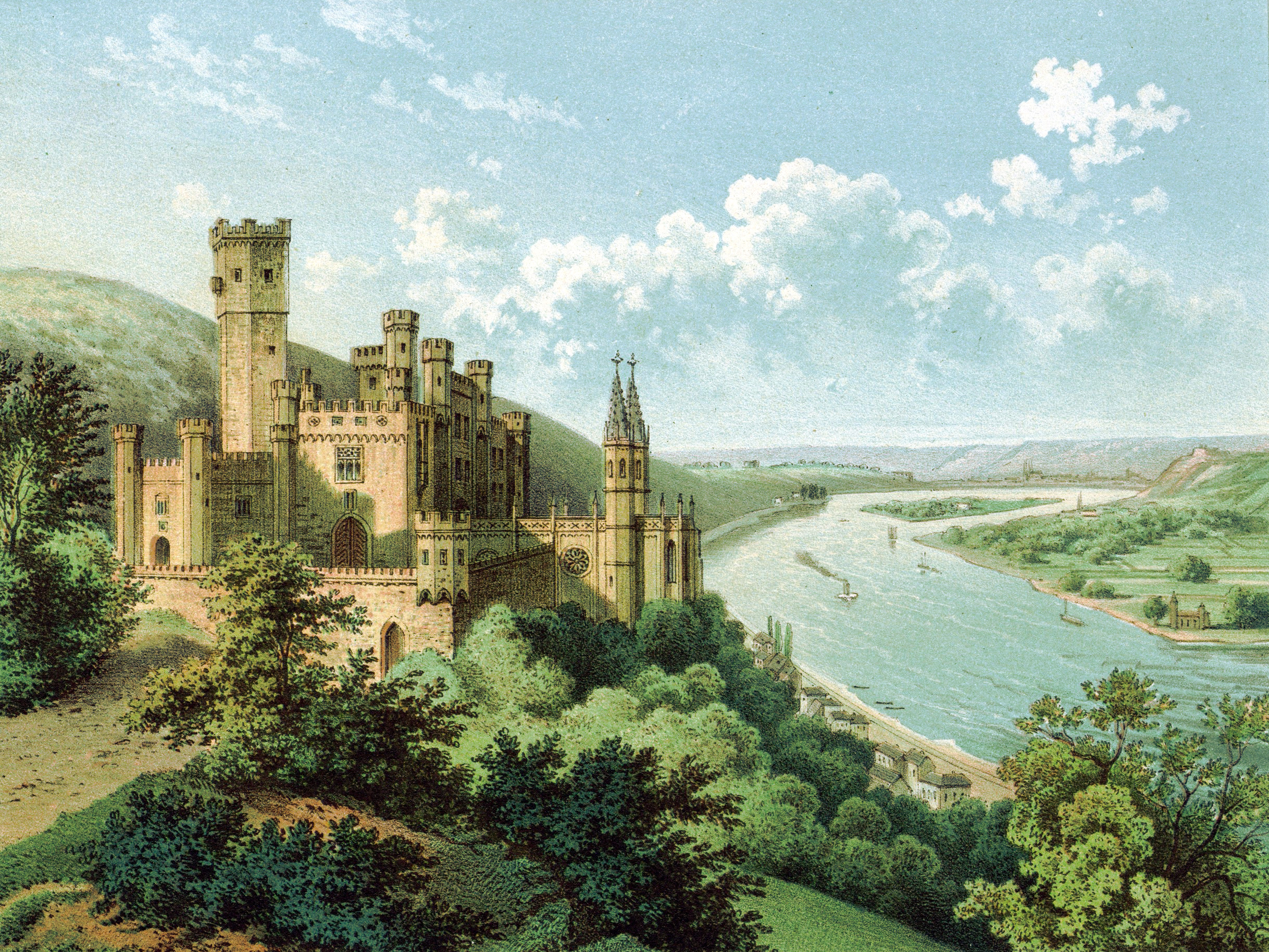
Stolzenfels Castle

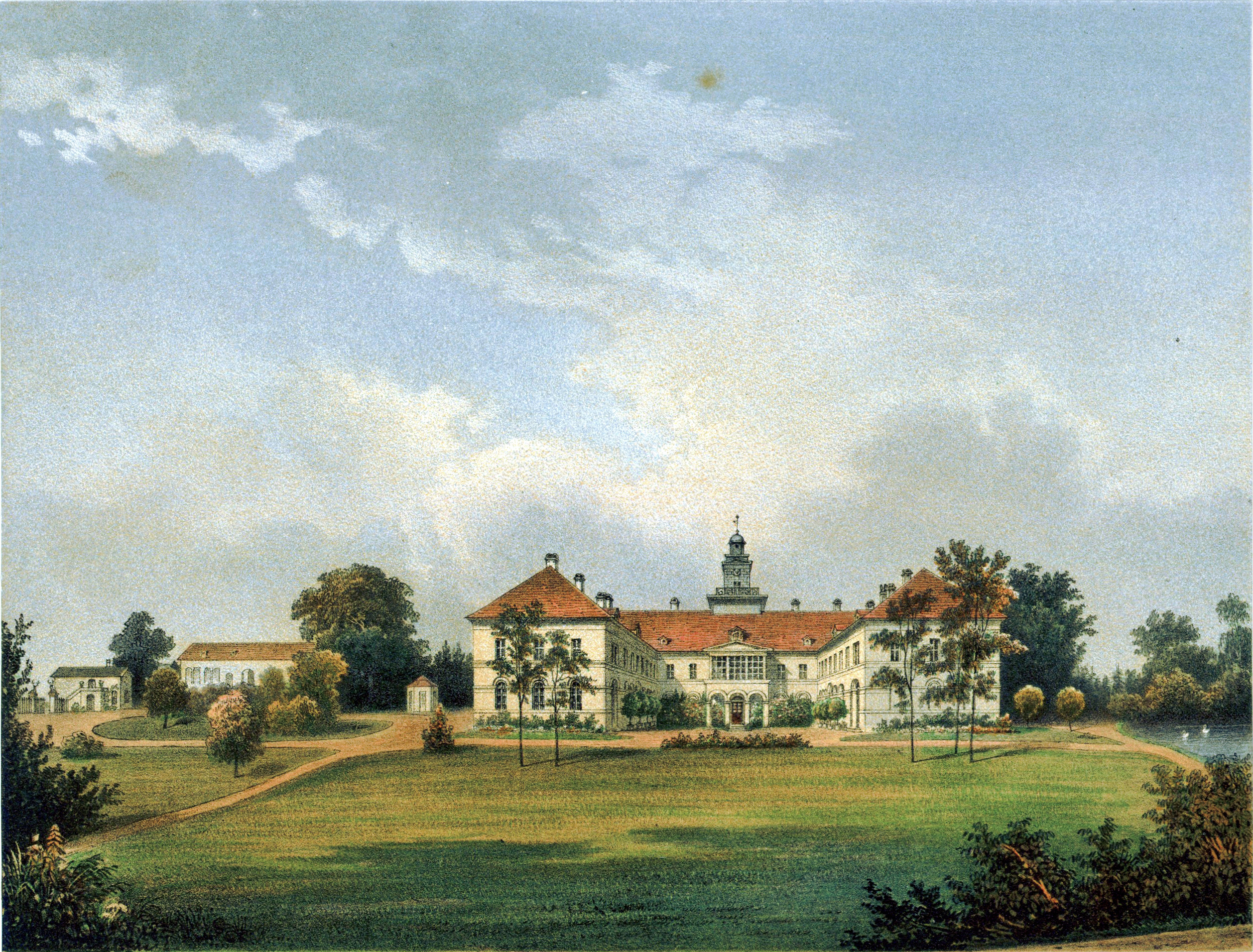
Tillowitz (Silesia / Province of Silesia)

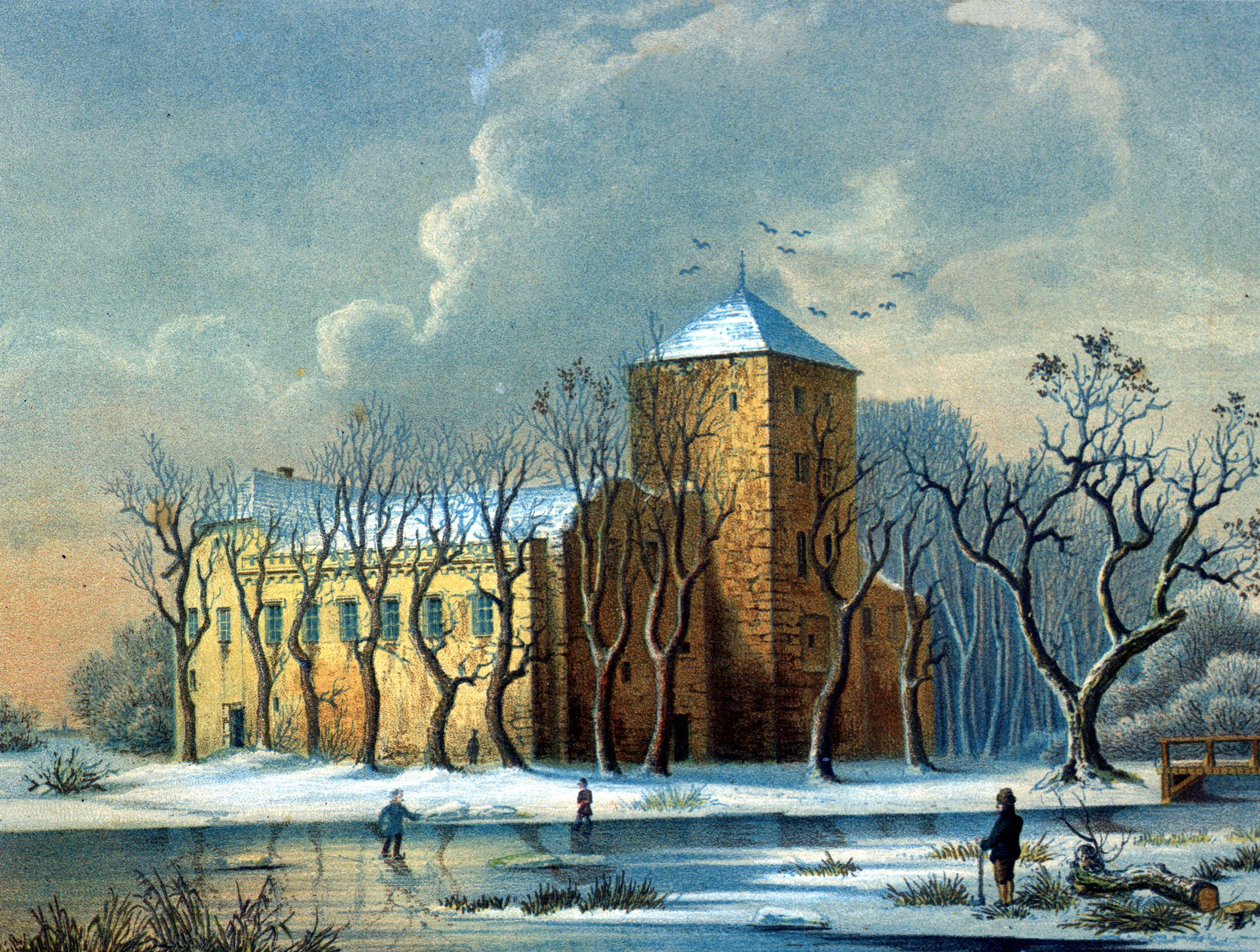
Chutow Castle (Silesia / Province of Silesia)

Another large project was an edition of the political correspondence of Frederick the Great, which by Duncker's death had appeared in 24 volumes – eventually totaling 46 volumes by 1939 when it was interrupted by the second world war. The project resumed with the issue of volume 47 in 2003.

Duncker also wrote works including:

- 1851 The Patriots: National drama in three acts.
- 1867 Through Night to the Light. A time story
- 1877 Off the road. Poems of a vagabond
- 1886 Angiola Folimarino (novella)
- 1891 Her Picture (novella)
- 1897 The Swallows. A children's tale.
