= Hirsch-Duncker trade unions =

The Hirsch-Duncker trade unions (German: Hirsch-Dunckersche Gewerkvereine) were working-class liberal-aligned trade unions active in the German Empire and the German Republic.

Whilst initially a similar size to other trade union movements in Germany, the Hirsch-Duncker trade unions were unable to keep pace with the growth of their Socialist and Christian counterparts.

== History ==
=== Early years ===
The first Hirsch-Duncker trade unions were founded in September 1868 by Max Hirsch and Franz Duncker. The movement was founded in as an effort to overcome the division between German liberalism and working-class politics, and with the intent of resolving conflicts between workers and business peacefully.

In terms of membership, the Hirsch-Duncker trade unions were initially on-par with each of the two socialist-aligned trade union movements, one of which being aligned with the Social Democratic Workers' Party of Germany (SDAP) and the other aligned with the General German Workers' Association (ADAV). When the SDAP and ADAV merged to form the Social Democratic Party of Germany, their supporting trade unions coalesced into a unified socialist movement. The Hirsch-Duncker movement was unable to keep up with their socialist counterparts. Even with the Anti-Socialist Laws criminalising the socialist trade unions for over a decade until 1890, that year they still amounted to five times as many members as the total 60,000 members belonging to Hirsch-Duncker trade unions. Not long after, the Christian trade unions also overtook the Hirsch-Duncker trade unions membership.

=== November revolution ===
Around the time of the German revolution of 1918–1919, Gustav Hartmann, as chairman Federation of German Labour Associations (Verband der deutschen Gewerkvereine), was a leading figure in the Hirsch-Duncker trade union movement. Hartmann was also one of the co-founders of the German Democratic Party (DDP). In addition to its largely middle-class base, the DDP's 1918–19 electoral coalition contained a large contingent of the Hirsch-Duncker trade union movement, with the party standing multiple candidates from the movement. Hirsch-Duncker trade unions also provided some campaign funds directly to labour candidates of the DDP. The new electoral system made special interest organisations like the Hirsch-Duncker unions, Christian unions, and Socialist unions more important.

Put under pressure by the revolution, efforts were taken by members of the liberal-aligned Hirsch-Duncker union movement and the Christian trade union movement to establish a joint umbrella federation to provide a united non-socialist base. To that end, Gustav Hartmann and Adam Stegerwald were involved in founding the German Democratic Trade Union Federation (Deutsch-demokratischer Gewerkschaftsbund, DDGB). Despite these efforts, In November 1919, the Hirsch-Duncker unions split from the federation due to ideological differences with the political Catholicism of the Christian unions. Following their departure, the DDGB was reformed into the German Trade Union Confederation (1919–1933) (Deutscher Gewerkschaftsbund, DGB).

Anton Erkelenz and other figures in the Hirsch-Duncker trade union movement founded the Free National Labor Congress in 1918. Erkelenz, Hartmann, and Gustav Schneider. worked with figures in the white-collar Confederation of Professionals Unions as well as civil service trade unions to form the Free National Ring of German Worker, Employee, and Civil Servant Unions (FNG). On formation, the total number of members represented by the FNG was 700,000. The FNG resembled Stegerwald's DGB in that both included a mix of working-class, white-collar, and civil servant unions.

The DDP endorsed the general strike against the Kapp Putsch. In the aftermath of the Kapp Putsch, socialist trade union leader Carl Legien produced a list of nine demands put before the government for the trade unions to end the general strike. Whilst the DDP as a whole did not support the demands, five DDP MdRs spoke in favour of the demands, including Gustav Hartmann and Wilhelm Gleichauf both of the Hirsch-Duncker trade union movement.

=== Decline and termination ===
The Great Depression greatly hampered the ability the ability of the socialist, Christian, and Hirsch-Duncker union movements to operate and organise. In response, the three movements grew closer to each-other. Whilst discussions of a potential all-out merger into a single organised force, nothing came of this and the three remained separate. After the founding of the Iron Front, many Social Democrats hoped that Hirsch-Duncker trade unions as well as Christian trade union would join in the organisation, but too was not realised.

The Hirsch-Duncker trade unions were forcibly dissolved during the Nazification of Germany.

== Outlook and approach ==
The Hirsch-Duncker unions were modelled on trade unions in the United Kingdom, with some taking on the structure of benefit societies.

The Hirsch-Duncker unions were more hesitant to strike action and more preferential to collective negotiations. In their earlier years, the Hirsch-Duncker unions struggled with unsuccessful strikes.

The Hirsch-Duncker unions were officially neutral in partisan politics, but generally aligned to the German Democratic Party, and to liberalism in general.

Hirsch-Duncker unions published Wirtschaftliche Selbstverwaltung to inform members of Works council.

== Membership ==
Total membership belonging to Hirsch-Duncker unions by year:

Year	Members
1885	50,000
1890	60,000
1901	100,000
1922	230,000
1933	150,000

== See also ==
- General German Trade Union Federation (ADGB)
- United Federation of Christian Trade Unions in Germany (GcG)
- German Civil Service Federation (DBB)
- Ernst Lemmer
- German Labour Front (Nazi controlled union)

== Works cited ==
- Jones, Larry Eugene (1988). German Liberalism and the Dissolution of the Weimar Party System, 1918–1933. Chapel Hill, North Carolina: The University of North Carolina Press.
- Schönhoven, Klaus (1992). "Germany to 1945". In Campbell, Joan (ed.). European Labor Unions. Greenwood Press.
- Fyre, Bruce (1985). Liberal Democrats in the Weimar Republic: The History of the German Democratic Party and the German State Party. Southern Illinois University Press. ISBN 0-8093-1207-7.
- Dawson, William Harbutt (1911). "Capital and Labour". The Evolution of Modern Germany (Third Impression ed.). London: T. Fisher Unwin.
