= Dora Duncker =

German writer and theatre critic (1855–1916)

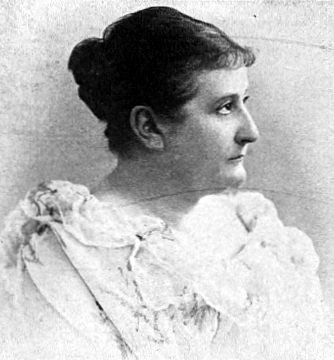
1898

Dora Livia Felicia Maria Duncker (28 March 1855 – 9 October 1916) was a German writer of novels, short stories, essays, poems and stage works. She was also active as a theatre critic.

== Life ==
Duncker was born in Berlin, a child of the publisher and book dealer Alexander Duncker, grandchild of Carl Friedrich Wilhelm Duncker, and part of a larger dynasty well established in several branches of the book trade. She was educated by private tutors. She also undertook significant "study trips" through Austria—notably in the Tirol, Northern Italy and Switzerland. She also became acquainted with the artist Karl von Piloty. Both at her family home in Berlin, and at von Piloty's home in Munich, she became part of a wider network of the arts and literature establishment that included the artists Hans Makart and Franz von Lenbach along with the writer, Paul Heyse.

Her first published work, the drama Sphinx, appeared in 1881. In 1887, then annually for the next ten years, she produced the children's calendar, Buntes Jahr. In 1888 she married. The marriage was quickly followed by separation and then ended in divorce, however it also resulted in the birth of a daughter. Dora Duncker and her daughter Eva then lived together in Berlin. Following the collapse of her marriage Dora Duncker supported herself as a prolific freelance author and contributing editor.

== Works (selection) ==
- Über die Bedeutung der deutschen Ausstellung in München in Beziehung auf ihre Anordnung und ihren kunstgewerblichen Theil. (Ausstellung München). Alexander Duncker, Berlin 1876. 26 S.
- Sphinx. Drama in 4 parts. F. Bloch, Berlin 1881. 76 S. (Bühnenmanuskript)
- Moderne Meister, Berlin 1883
- So zwitschern die Jungen. Folk tales. Illustriert von E. Elias. Publisher: Alexander Duncker, Berlin 1885. 4 Bl., 64 S., 16 Tafeln
- Käte Grumbkow. Novelle. H. Paetel, Berlin 1886
- Um ein Haar. Plauderei in einem Akt. F. Bloch, Berlin 1886
- Reelles Heiratsgesuch etc., Stuttgart 1888
- Morsch im Kern. Roman. Carl Freund & Jeckel, Berlin 1889
- Dies und das. Liebes- und andere Geschichten. Publisher: Alexander Duncker, Berlin 1890
- Ein Lieutenant verloren etc., Stuttgart 1891
- Unheilbar. Roman. Deutsche Verlags-Anstalt, Stuttgart [u. a.] 1893. (Digital Ressource)
- Die Goldfliege. Berliner Sittenroman. F. Fontane & C., Berlin 1894. 228 S.
- Meine Herren Collegen!. Momentaufnahmen von einer jungen Schriftstellerin. G. Pohlmann, Berlin 1894. 63 S.
- Die Modistin. Novellen und Skizzen. Freund & Jeckel, Berlin 1894. 144 S.
- Loge 2. 1.–3. Tsd. R. Eckstein Nachf., Berlin 1896
- Plaudereien und Skizzen aus dem Berliner Zoologischen Garten. Verlag von Alexander Duncker, Berlin 1896
- Überraschungen. Humoresken. R. Eckstein Nachf., Berlin 1896
- Mütter. F. Fontane & C., Berlin 1897
- Familie. Vita, Berlin 1898
- Großstadt. 1.–10. Tsd. R. Eckstein Nachf., Berlin 1900
- Der Ritter vom hohen C, Leipzig 1900
- Die große Lüge. 1.–10. Tsd. R. Eckstein Nachf., Berlin 1901
- Komödiantenfahrten. Müller – Mann, Leipzig 1901. 143 S.
- Groß-Berlin. Neue Novellen. 1. – 10. Tsd. R. Eckstein Nachf., Berlin 1902. 96 S. (Ecksteins Moderne Bibliothek, Bd. 18)
- Sie soll deine Magd sein. Roman. Buchschmuck von Walter Caspari. 1.–10. Tsd. R. Eckstein Nachf., Berlin 1902. (Ecksteins illustr. Romanbibliothek, 3 Jg., Bd. 7)
- Gustav Wöhrmann. Schauspiel in 3 Akten. Bühnenmanuskript. R. Eckstein Nachf., Berlin 1903. 96 S.
- Lottes Glück. Totgelacht, München 1903
- Mütter. Zwei Novellen. 1. – 10. Tsd. R. Eckstein Nachf., Berlin 1903. 96 S. (Ecksteins Moderne Bibliothek, Bd. 25)
- Maria Magdalena. Roman. 1. – 5. Tsd. R. Eckstein Nachf., Berlin 1903. 254 S.
- Die Schönheitsstube, Berlin 1904
- Gesühnt. Volksschauspiel in 4 Aufzügen. A. Entsch in Kommission, Berlin 1905. 62 S.
- Die heilige Frau. Berliner Theater – Roman. Gebr. Paetel, Berlin 1905. 372 S.
- Jugend. Novellen. Gebr. Paetel, Berlin 1905
- Märchen und Erzählungen. Globus Verlag, Berlin 1905. 208 S.
- Falsches Ziel. Familie. Novellen. With illustrations by Arthur Lewin. H. Hillger, Berlin-Leipzig 1906. 110 S. (Kürschners Bücherschatz, Bd. 525)
- Die Graue Gasse. Roman. Gebr. Paetel, Berlin 1906. 278 S.
  - Die graue Gasse. Roman. Post & Müller, Leipzig 1916. 293 S. (Wiking – Bücher, Bd. 14)
- Leiden. Der Roman eines Knaben. S. Schottlaender, Berlin 1908. 415 S.
- Ernst von Wildenbruch. Ernstes und Heiteres aus seinem Leben. Gebr. Paetel, Berlin 1909. 111 S. (Dramaturgische Plaudereien, Bd. 3)
- Kämpfer. Roman. Gebr. Paetel, Berlin 1909. 306 S.
- Der schöne Ede und anderes. Neue Berliner Novellen. with illustrations by H. Binde. H. Hillger, Berlin-Leipzig 1909. 96 S. (Kürschners Bücherschatz, Bd. 664)
- Das Perlenbuch. Neue Novellen und Skizzen. Gebr. Paetel, Berlin 1910. 202 S.
- Die Schneekönigin. Ein deutsches Märchenspiel in ein Vorspiel und drei Akten mit Zugrundelegung von Hans Christian Andersens. Verlag Tescher, Charlottenburg 1910. 96 S.
- Im Separee. Großstadtbilder. Borngraeber, Berlin 1911. 139 S.
- Bergeholz Söhne. Roman. Gebr. Paetel, Berlin 1912. 318 S.
- Ein Liebesidyll Ludwigs XIV.. Louise de la Valliére. Historischer Roman. Bong, Berlin 1912. 335 S. (Romane berühmter Männer und Frauen, Bd. 5)
- Doktor Stillfried. Historischer Roman. 3. Auflage. Beyer, Charlottenburg 1913. 215 S.
- Festschrift zur Zweihundert-Jahr-Feier am 3. Mai 1913. Nicolaische Buchhandlung Borstell & Reimarus 1713–1913. Berlin 1913. 43 S.
- Die kleine Hoheit. Lustspiel in 3 Akten von Dora Duncker und Hans Gaus. Eduard Bloch, Berlin 1913. 76 S.
- Marquise von Pompadour. Ein Roman aus galanter Zeit. Bong, Berlin 1913. 392 S. (Romane berühmter Männer und Frauen, Bd. 8)
- Die Blonden und der Riese. Roman. Reißner, Dresden 1914. 329 S.
- Berlin im Kriege. Großstadtskizzen aus dem Kriegsjahr 1914/15. Globus Verlag, Berlin 1915. 250 S. (http://resolver.staatsbibliothek-berlin.de/SBB00007CB200000000)
- Auf zur Sonne. A novel of our times. Gebr. Paetel, Berlin 1916. 314 S.
- George Sand. Ein Buch der Leidenschaft. Historischer Roman. Bong, Berlin 1916. 334 S. (Romane berühmter Männer und Frauen, Bd. 11)
- Liebe um Liebe. Herz, Berlin 1916. 95 S. (Herz – Bücher, Bd. 10)
- Das Haus Duncker. Ein Buchhändlerroman aus dem Biedermeier. Mit sieben Lichtdrucken. Gebr. Paetel, Berlin 1918. 307 S.
- Die Frau mit den Hyazinthen. Roman. Oldenburg, Leipzig 1918. 277 S.
- Die Kinder des Herrn Ulrich. Roman. Montanus, Siegen 1919. 388 S.
- Die Kleine Hoheit. Operetta in 3 Acts by Hans Gaus, based on the stage comedy of the same name by Dora Duncker and Hans Gaus. Music by Martin Knopf. Bibliothek für Dramatik und Musik, Berlin 1919. 31 S.
- Sumpfland, Reutlingen 1925
- Doktor Stillfried. Humoristischer Roman. Mit 28 Textillustrationen. Ehrlich, Berlin 1920. 191 S. (Ehrlichs illustrierte Bücherei, Bd. 2)
- Die große Lüge. Roman. Weichert, Berlin (um 1927). 256 S. (Weichert-Bücher, Bd. 2)
- Großstadt. Roman. Weichert, Berlin (um 1927). 255 S. (Weichert-Bücher, Bd. 7)

=== Translations into German ===
- Edmond About: Pariser Ehen. Übersetzt aus dem Französischen. Engelhorn, Stuttgart 1886. 157 S. (Engelhorns allgemeine Romanbibliothek, Jg. 3 Band 7)
- Alexandre Dumas, fils: Ein Freund der Frauen. Comedy if five parts. Adapted for the German stage by Dora Duncker. Reclam Leipzig, 1891. 85 S. (Reclam Universal Bibliothek, Bd. 2878)
