= Carl Friedrich Wilhelm Duncker =

German publisher and bookseller (1781–1869)

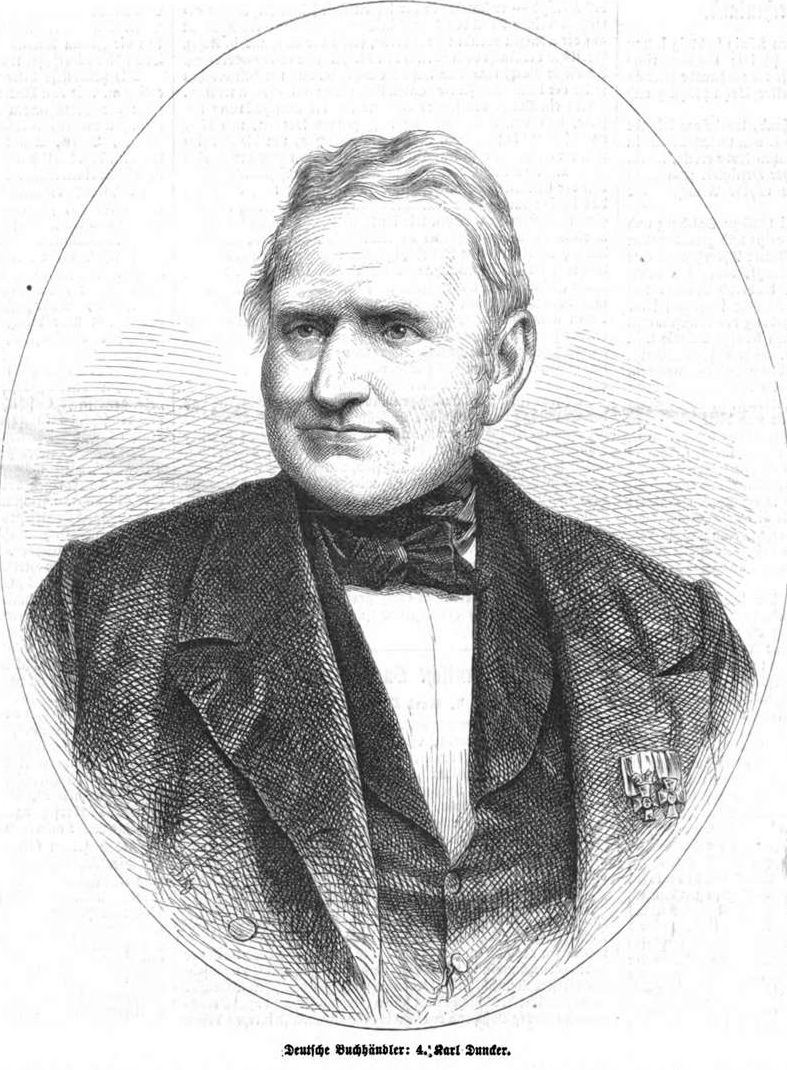
- Duncker in 1867
- Born: 25 May 1781; Berlin, Kingdom of Prussia
- Died: 15 July 1869 (aged 88); Berlin, Kingdom of Prussia
- Occupation(s): Publisher, bookseller
- Spouse: Fanny Levi (m. 1810)
- Children: Maximilian Duncker; Alexander Duncker; Hermann Duncker; Franz Duncker
- Relatives: Dora Duncker (granddaughter)

Carl Friedrich Wilhelm Duncker (25 March 1781 – 15 July 1869) was a German publisher and bookseller. He played an important part in the early creation and growth of the publishing firm which became Duncker & Humblot, more recently the publishers of the Neue Deutsche Biographie, a biographical dictionary.

== Life and career ==
=== Family ===
Carl Friedrich Wilhelm Duncker was born in Berlin; his parents' only recorded child. His father, the merchant Christian Wilhelm Duncker (1749–1783), died while he was still an infant. His mother, Charlotte (née Adolphie), remarried, which made it possible to preserve his father's business.

In 1810, Duncker married Fanny Levi (1791–1869), the daughter of the banker and military supplier Wolff Levy. Their children included the historian Maximilian Duncker (1811–1886), the publisher and bookseller Alexander Duncker, the Berlin mayor Hermann Duncker (1817–1893) and the publisher-politician Franz Duncker (1822–1888). The novelist Dora Duncker was a granddaughter.

=== Early years ===
Duncker was briefly a pupil at the Köllnisches Gymnasium in Berlin, but his stepfather decided that a career in business would suit him better than an academic one, and he was switched to a commercial school recently established by Karl Spazier and a Dr Schulze. After this he was set up in business in a small shop. However, the late eighteenth century was a period of growth in publishing and literature and Duncker found himself increasingly drawn into the world of books. In November 1800 he moved to Leipzig where he embarked on an apprenticeship in the book trade with Georg Voß. On completion of his training period Voß wrote that Duncker had applied himself to his work and to his learning "with demonstrable care and fidelity" ("mit der bewiesenen Treue und Aufmerksamkeit"). It becomes apparent that in Voß he had acquired a lifelong friend and mentor.

=== In business ===
He returned to Berlin at the beginning of February 1806, accepting an invitation to take a job as an assistant to the book dealer and publisher Heinrich Frölich whose business, since its establishment in 1798, had thrived: Frölich had built up excellent literary and commercial connections. However, just six weeks after Duncker had joined him, on 11 March 1806 Frölich died suddenly, and Carl Duncker found himself running the firm. Duncker was confident that he would be able to sustain the business, but Frölich's widow was vehemently of the opinion that he was too young and inexperienced to do so. They called in the author and book dealer Friedrich Nicolai, a venerated elder of the Berlin book world, to arbitrate. Nicolai came down in support of Duncker who was left in post, to manage the business through what proved to be an exceptionally difficult couple of years for those seeking to live through commerce. Berlin was occupied by French troops between October 1806 and December 1808, while intensified fighting persisted in Silesia and East Prussia, where the king had been obliged to move with his court and government following military defeat in 1806. International trade was also inhibited by the blockade of the Prussian ports imposed by the British navy in response to Emperor Napoleon's so-called Continental System.

Despite all this, by 1808 Duncker had managed to clear all the debts of the firm, and the withdrawal of French troops from Berlin at the end of the year offered the possibility of slightly less troubled times ahead. Duncker now decided to purchase the business from Frölich's widow. In order to be able to do this he entered into a partnership with a business contact and entrepreneur called Peter Humblot whom he had been able to get to know better while they were serving together in the National Guard. Duncker and Humblot agreed to acquire the business on a 50:50 basis, and to share profits and losses on an equal basis. Duncker was able to fund his share of the purchase price with a loan from his step-father, in return for a mortgage. They traded under the business name "Duncker and Humblot". Peter Humblot died in 1828, leaving Duncker as the sole proprietor: but the name of the business remained unchanged.

In broad terms, Duncker's strategy followed the path established by Heinrich Frölich, while displaying a keen sensitivity to evolving trends in taste and attitude. There was a focus on high quality academic and literary authors. History, at that time a subject of growing importance, was at the core of the business. He was endlessly attentive to the publication of Karl Friedrich Becker's nine volume "World History for Children and Teachers" ("Weltgeschichte für Kinder und Kinderlehrer"). Becker died in 1805, but the work was repeatedly expanded and updated by other historians, described later by his son as "excellently selected editors" ("vortrefflich gewählte Bearbeiter"): by 1867 it had reached 20 volumes.

Other authors who were published by Duncker & Humblot even in those early years included the poets/writers, Goethe, E. T. A. Hoffmann and de la Motte Fouqué. The historian Leopold von Ranke was persuaded to switch from his existing publisher to Duncker. From 1832 Duncker was also the publisher for all of Hegel's output. Between 1834 and 1845 the "Litterarische Zeitung" ("Literary Newspaper"), essentially the first national literary journal in Germany, was being produced by Duncker & Humblot, as were the "Yearbooks of Academic Criticism" ("Jahrbücher für wissenschaftliche Kritik") between 1833 and 1842.

=== Beyond business ===
In 1824 he became a member of the executive committee of the German Exchange Association of Book Dealers ("Börsenverein der Deutschen Buchhändler"), retaining his membership till 1866. He served as its first chairman from 1828 and 1831. He was also a Berlin city councillor for fifteen years.

== Death ==
Duncker died peacefully, surrounded by his children, on 15 July 1869. In January 1866 he had transferred the Duncker & Humblot publishing business to the Leipzig publisher Carl Geibel. Despite the relocation to Leipzig, the name of the company was unchanged, both under Geibel and under his son (also called Carl Geibel).
