= Peter Humblot =

German book seller and publisher

- Born: 13 March 1779; Berlin, Prussia
- Died: 11 December 1828 (aged 49); Berlin, Prussia
- Occupations: Entrepreneur; Book dealer Publisher
- Spouse: Amélie Jordan (1789–1877)
- Children: Bertha

Peter Humblot (13 March 1779 – 11 December 1828) was a German book seller and publisher.

== Life ==
Peter Humblot was born in Berlin. He was the second son of a knife maker from Langres in Champagne who had relocated to Berlin where he believed - correctly, as matters turned out - that there would be more possibilities for expanding his business than in small-town eastern France. He was able to afford a good education for his children: Peter attended Berlin' well-regarded Friedrichswerdersches Gymnasium (secondary school) until he was 14. He then embarked on an apprenticeship with the "Franckesche Buchhandlung" (book dealer). In a conscious move to prepare himself for work in the book trade, in his spare time he studied the history of literature, bibliography and encyclopaediae. His excellent memory and excellent knowledge of languages enabled him to gain a broad education in this way. Meanwhile, on the international front an uneasy peace had been restored by the Peace of Basel in 1795, and in 1798 Humblot relocated to Braunschweig where his transferred his apprenticeship to the "Thomassche Buchhandlung". Two years later, having concluded his apprenticeship, but finding the opportunities in Braunschweig somewhat limited, he moved south to Basel where he worked with the "Deckersche Buchhandlung". He built up excellent business relationships in Basel, but in 1802 was drawn back to Berlin to take up a position with the book dealer and publishing house, Haude & Spenersche Verlagsbuchhandlung where an opportunity had arisen following the death of one of the proprietors of the business.

Shortly afterwards, however, he moved to Paris, which appeared to offer more promising commercial prospects. However, by 1806, he was back in Berlin where, between October 1806 and December 1808, matters were complicated by French military occupation of the city. Meanwhile, Humblot's friend, Carl Friedrich Wilhelm Duncker, was running the publishing business built up by Heinrich Frölich. Frölich had recruited Duncker as an assistant and then, just six weeks later, died suddenly in March 1806. Duncker spent the next two years returning the business to solvency, despite the unwavering opposition of Frölich's widow. In 1808, Duncker persuaded his former employer's widow to sell him the business. To do this, he needed a partner, presumably for financial reasons. On 1 January 1809, Duncker and Humblot acquired the business, agreeing to share profits and losses on an equal basis. The business was renamed Duncker & Humblot, which is the name under which it continues to trade (2018).

In 1828, Peter Humblot was elected a deputy in the Berlin city council. He died later that same year.

== Personal ==
In 1812, Peter Humblot married Amélie Jordan (1789–1877), the daughter of a Berlin jeweller. Their daughter Bertha later married the physicist-chemist Heinrich Gustav Magnus.
