= Anton Erkelenz =

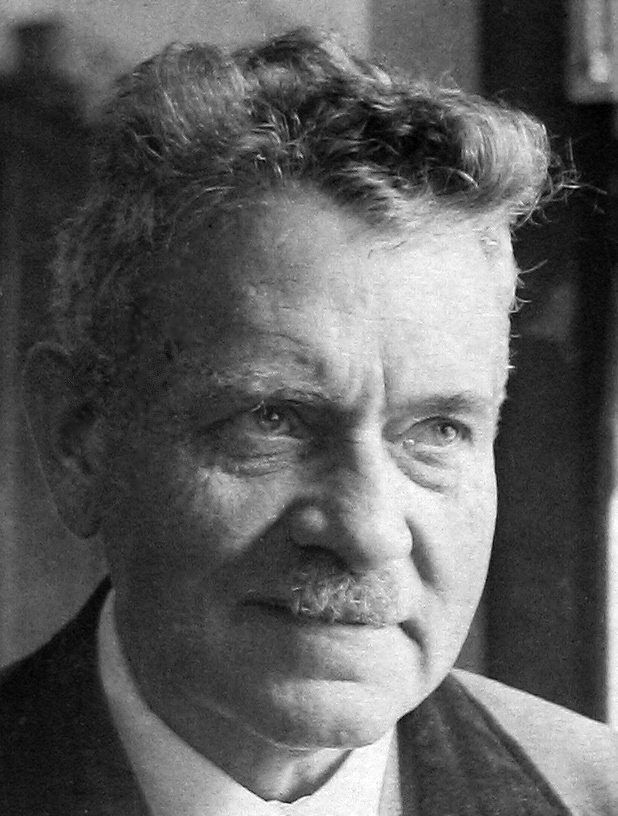
- Anton Erkelenz 1943

Member of the Reichstag
- In office 1920–1933

Member of the Weimar National Assembly
- In office 1919–1920

Personal details
- Born: 10 October 1878 Neuss, Rhine Province, Prussia, German Empire
- Died: 25 April 1945 (aged 66) Zehlendorf, Berlin, Nazi Germany
- Party: FVG (1904–1910); FVP (1910–1918); DDP (1918–1930); SPD (from 1930)
- Anton Erkelenz's voice Portion of Erkelenz's "Citizen or Subject" speech before the Reichstag (in German)

Anton Peter Erkelenz (10 October 1878 – 25 April 1945) was a German liberal politician and a leading figure in the Hirsch-Duncker trade unions. He was a founding member of the German Democratic Party (DDP) and a leading member of the party's left wing, particularly on economic issues, and chaired the party's executive committee until 1929. In 1930 he left the DDP for the Social Democratic Party.

== Early life ==
Anton Erkelenz was born into a working-class Catholic family in Neuss. He trained as a turner and locksmith in his father's business, and in 1902 became a full-time workers' secretary for the trade unions.

== Politics ==
Erkelenz entered politics through the Hirsch-Duncker trade union movement.

In 1904 he joined the left-liberal Free-minded Union. This party merged into the Progressive People's Party in 1910. By this time, the left-wing liberals advocated a moderately social-liberal programme and had recognised the need for basic state welfare provision.

At the outbreak of the First World War in 1914 Erkelenz was conscripted; he served as an infantryman on the Western and Eastern Fronts and received the Iron Cross, Second Class.

During the German revolution, Erkelenz served on a workers' and soldiers' council.

In 1918, Erkelenz was involved in the founding of the German Democratic Party (DDP) in Düsseldorf. As a leading figure of the party's left wing, Erkelenz envisioned the DDP as a liberal-democratic party that could form a link between social democracy and the bourgeois parties. He was able to become a major figure in the party because of the prospect that he might increase the DDP's support among working-class voters.

Together with other figures in the Hirsch-Duncker trade union movement, Erkelenz founded the Free National Labour Congress in 1918. Erkelenz, Gustav Hartmann and Gustav Schneider worked with figures in the white-collar Federation of Employee Unions as well as civil service trade unions to form the Free National Ring of German Workers', Employees' and Civil Servants' Unions (FNG).

Erkelenz, along with others, briefly considered leaving the DDP's parliamentary group over the Treaty of Versailles.

Erkelenz, as with others on the DDP's left, advocated the establishment of works councils, and was one of the few figures to welcome the passage of the Works Councils Act.

Erkelenz was elected chairman of the DDP executive committee in 1920, following the death of Robert Friedberg. (Note: Jürgen Frölich dates his chairmanship of the executive committee from 1921.) As chairman, he continued his rivalry with Hermann Fischer, who now sat as deputy chairman of the executive committee, and clashed with Erich Koch-Weser. In 1929, Erkelenz resigned as chair, and Koch-Weser succeeded him.

In 1930, Erkelenz and Ludwig Bergsträsser left the DDP in protest against the party's merger with the Young German Order to form the German State Party (DStP), and instead joined the Social Democratic Party.

== Political positions ==
Anton Erkelenz wanted to reconcile the divide between German liberalism and the labour movement. In the second half of the 19th century, the working class had distanced itself from liberalism. Liberals recognised too late that the market economy, without state intervention, disadvantaged the working class. Consequently, increasing numbers of workers turned either to the Social Democratic Party or the Catholic Centre Party. Erkelenz was a staunch advocate of cooperative self-help, which he believed should be complemented by state social policies. Even before the First World War, he rejected the notion that liberalism should solely be for the bourgeoisie.

After 1918, Erkelenz favoured "denationalisation" of social policy, regarding Germany's state-run social policy as a vestige of Bismarck's authoritarian state. Instead, he believed the Republic should transfer such institutions into self-governance, with the state only exercising technical oversight. This concept failed because there was no fundamental consensus on social policy between employers and trade unions.

In the early 1930s Erkelenz was highly critical of Heinrich Brüning's deflationary policies, accusing Brüning of driving voters towards the Nazi Party. In 1931 he wrote: "Anyone who wants to fight Hitler must end the deflationary process, this massive destruction of labour, value, and capital."

Erkelenz supported changing the German flag from the Imperial black-white-red flag to the republican black-red-gold flag.

== Death ==
Erkelenz died in Berlin-Zehlendorf in late April 1945, during the Soviet occupation of the city, while trying to protect his housekeeper.

== Legacy ==
The Erkelenzdamm in Berlin-Kreuzberg is named after Anton Erkelenz.

== Publications ==
- Katechismus des Gewerbegerichts- und Kaufmannsgerichtsgesetzes. Buchverlag der „Hilfe“, Berlin 1908.
- Moderne Sozialpolitik. Berlin 1926.
- Zehn Jahre deutsche Republik. Ein Handbuch für republikanische Politik. Sieben Stäbe, Berlin 1928.
- Fehler der Arbeitslosenversicherung. In: Die Arbeitslosenversicherung. Jahrgang 1928.
- mit Fritz Mittelmann: Carl Schurz. Der Deutsche und Amerikaner. Zu seinem 100. Geburtstage am 2. März 1929. Berlin 1929.
- Der Abbauwahn. Gegen Deflation, gegen Inflation, für Stabilität. Berlin 1932.
- Der Rattenfänger von Braunau. Die Tragödie Deutschlands. Berlin 1932.
- mit Ludwig Heyde, Sidney Webb, Johannes Sassenbach, Adam Stegerwald, Albert Thomas: Internationales Handwörterbuch des Gewerkschaftswesens. Berlin 1931; Nachdruck: Keip, Frankfurt 1993, ISBN 978-3-8051-0100-4.

== Works cited ==
- Frye, Bruce B. (1985). Liberal Democrats in the Weimar Republic: The History of the German Democratic Party and the German State Party. Southern Illinois University Press. ISBN 0-8093-1207-7.
- Jones, Larry Eugene (1988). German Liberalism and the Dissolution of the Weimar Party System, 1918–1933. Chapel Hill, North Carolina: The University of North Carolina Press.

== General references ==
- Fleck, Hans-Georg (1994). Sozialliberalismus und Gewerkschaftsbewegung: Die Hirsch-Dunckerschen Gewerkvereine, 1868-1914 [Social Liberalism and the Trade Union Movement: The Hirsch-Duncker Trade Unions 1868–1914] (in German). Max Hirsch, Franz Gustav Duncker, Verband der Deutschen Gewerkvereine. Köln: Bund. ISBN 978-3-7663-2502-0.
- Christi, Karin (2018). "Band 2: Sozialpolitiker in der Weimarer Republik und im Nationalsozialismus 1919 bis 1945." [Volume 2: Social Politicians in the Weimar Republic and National Socialism 1919 to 1945] (PDF). In Hansen, Eckhard; Tennstedt, Florian (eds.). Biographisches Lexikon zur Geschichte der deutschen Sozialpolitik 1871 bis 1945 [Biographical Lexicon on the History of German Social Policy 1871 to 1945] (in German). Kassel: Kassel University Press. ISBN 978-3-7376-0474-1.
- Kellmann, Axel (2003). "Anton Erkelenz. Ein Sozialliberaler in der SPD am Ende der Weimarer Republik". Internationale Wissenschaftliche Korrespondenz zur Geschichte der Deutschen Arbeiterbewegung (in German). 39 (4): 479–504.
- Kellmann, Axel (2007). Anton Erkelenz: ein Sozialliberaler im Kaiserreich und in der Weimarer Republik (in German). Berlin: Lit Verlag. ISBN 978-3-8258-0343-8. OCLC 317949036.
- Lehnert, Detlef (17 June 2015). Vom Linksliberalismus Zur Sozialdemokratie: Politische Lebenswege in Historischen Richtungskonflikten 1890-1933 (Historische Demokratieforschung) (German ed.). Bohlau Verlag, Bohlau Verlag GmbH u. Co. KG. ISBN 978-3-412-22387-8. OCLC 912385288.
- Ludwig Rosenberg, Bernhard Tacke: Der Weg zur Einheits-Gewerkschaft. Hrsg. v. DGB-Bundesvorstand. satz + druck gmbh, Düsseldorf 1977.
- Martin Schumacher (Hrsg.): M.d.R. Die Reichstagsabgeordneten der Weimarer Republik in der Zeit des Nationalsozialismus. Politische Verfolgung, Emigration und Ausbürgerung, 1933–1945. Eine biographische Dokumentation. 3., erheblich erweiterte und überarbeitete Auflage. Droste, Düsseldorf 1994, ISBN 978-3-7700-5183-0.
- Stalmann, Volker (2018), "Rheinische Linksliberale in der Weimarer Republik: Bernhard Falk und Anton Erkelenz", Jahrbuch zur Liberalismus-Forschung, Nomos Verlagsgesellschaft mbH & Co. KG, pp. 177–200, doi:10.5771/9783845294346-177, ISBN 978-3-8452-9434-6
- Marie Elisabeth Lüders, Helga Grebing: Anton Erkelenz. In: Neue Deutsche Biographie. (NDB). Band 4. Duncker & Humblot, Berlin 1959, ISBN 978-3-428-00185-9, S. 591 (deutsche-biographie.de).
