= Franz von Schober =

Austrian poet, librettist, lithographer and actor

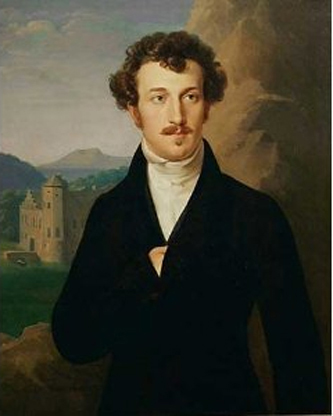
Schober and Torup castle, painted by L. Kupelwieser

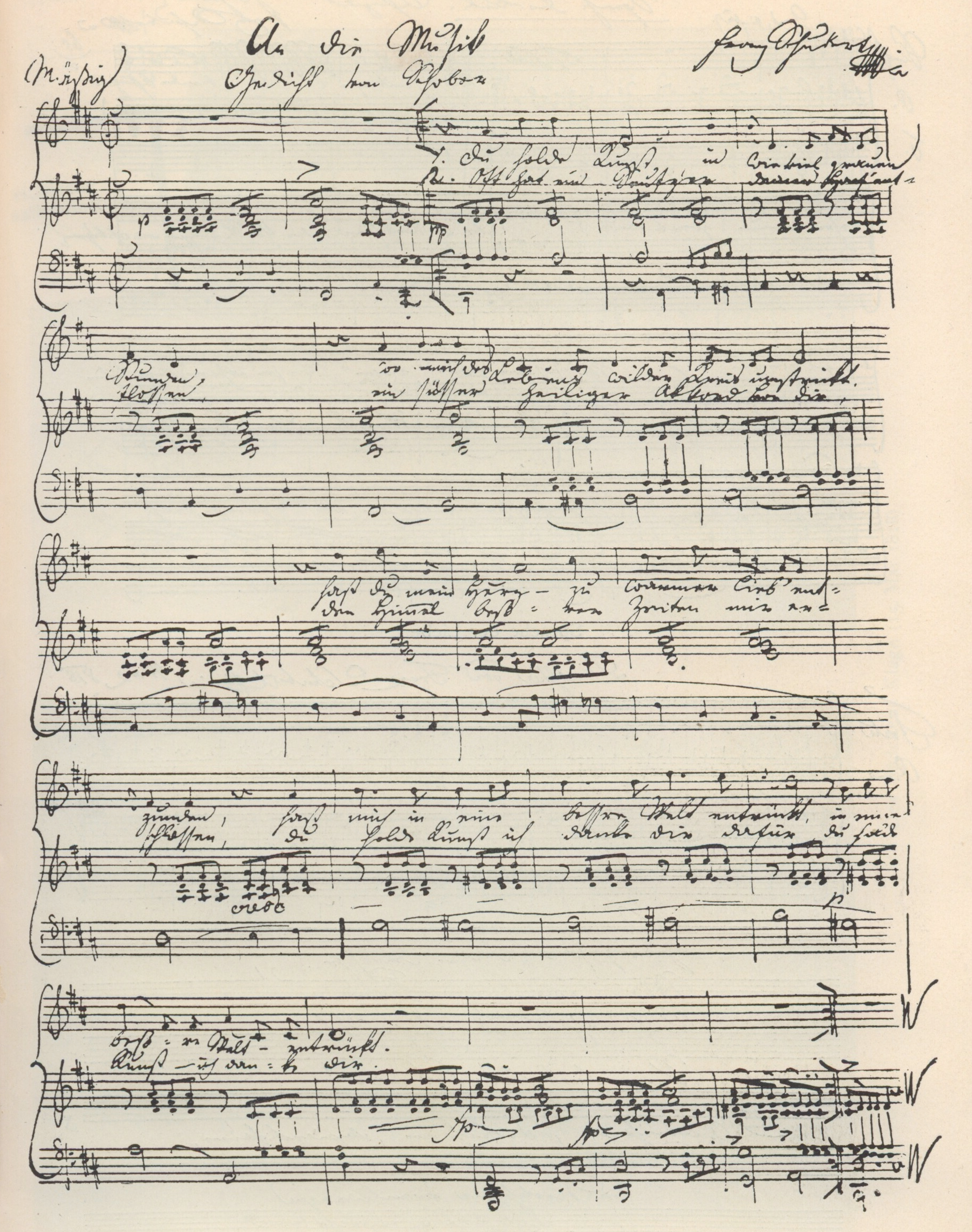
An die Musik – Schober's poem – one of Schubert's autograph manuscripts

Franz Adolf Friedrich Schober, since 1801 von Schober (born 17 May 1796, Torup Castle at Malmö, Sweden; died 13 September 1882 in Dresden), was a poet, librettist, lithographer, actor in Breslau and Legationsrat in Weimar.

Schober was born to Austrian parents in Sweden. Educated in the Schnepfenthal Salzmann School, Akademisches Gymnasium (Vienna) and Kremsmünster Abbey, he returned to Vienna, where he began to study philosophy and met the composer Franz Schubert, his friends Johann Mayrhofer, Joseph von Spaun and the painters Leopold Kupelwieser and Moritz von Schwind. Between 1823 and 1825, Schober was an actor at the theatre in Breslau under the pseudonym "Torupson". In the 1840s, Schober was in close contact with Franz Liszt. In 1856 he married the author Thekla von Gumpert; afterwards he lived in Budapest, Munich and Dresden.

Schober wrote lyric poetry and in 1821 the libretto for Franz Schubert's opera Alfonso und Estrella and other vocal pieces.

== Publications ==
- Gedichte (1842)
- Gedichte (1865)

== See also ==
- List of compositions by Franz Schubert
