= Thekla von Gumpert =

German writer (1810–1897)

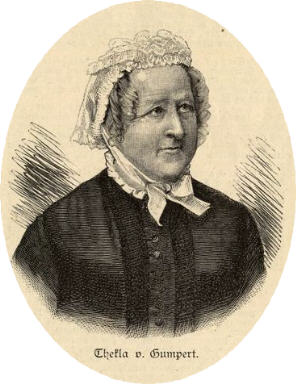
Thekla von Gumpert

Thekla Charlotte von Gumpert (married Thekla von Schober; 28 June 1810 in Kalisch – 1 April 1897 in Dresden) was a German children's and youth writer.

== Life ==
=== Origin ===
Thekla von Gumpert was born in Kalisch as the third of five children of Henriette née von Eckartsberg und Weißtrupp and the district physician Christian Gottlieb von Gumpert. In 1815, her father was transferred to Posen as a government medical officer, where he came into closer contact with Prussian government circles, in particular the Duke-Governor of the Grand Duchy of Posen, Antoni Henryk Radziwiłł. Thekla formed a close friendship with his daughter, Princess Wanda Czartoryski née Radziwiłł (1813–1846). The ending Napoleonic wars had spread immense misery across Europe. Thekla grew up in a healthy enclaveon, shaped by Prussian thinking and being a member of a professional society, which was to shape her and her future.

=== Head of the household and educator ===
Her father died when she was 22 years old. She lived on the family estate until it had to be sold. Afterwards she found accommodation with a relative, Baron von Seydlitz und Kurtzbach. Here Thekla von Gumpert dedicated herself to the upbringing of the children and recognized her inner vocation as a child educator. After the death of her former friend Princess Wanda, she took over the upbringing of her children and moved to Dresden. Six years followed, until her activity ended when Prince Adam Konstanty Czartoryski remarried with Countess Elzbieta Działyńska from Poznań. Then she moved to live with her mother in Berlin.

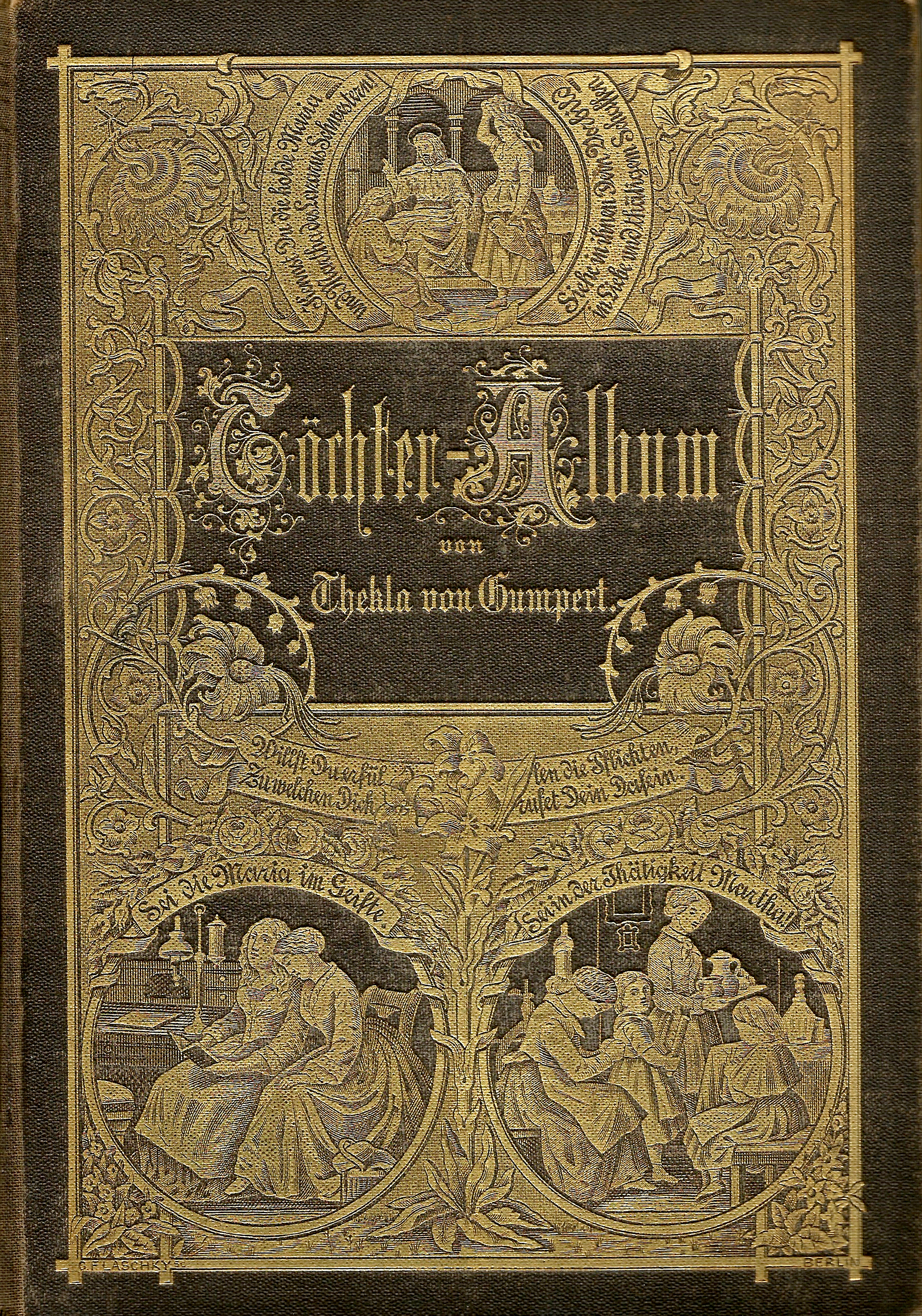
Daughters Album, 1885

=== Teenage writer and Froebel follower ===
Through the Weimar Legation Counselor and poet Franz von Schober, her later husband, whom she married at the age of 46 and from whom she separated again in 1860, she found the courage to combine her educational and literary skills and to follow the path of a young adult writer. Her first work, The little father and the grandchild, brought the desired success. Over the next few decades, she became one of the most widely read and well-known youth and children's writers of the time.

She traveled to England and through Germany to get to know educational institutions. However, the idea of founding his own educational institution never came to fruition. She kept in touch with the "father" of the kindergarten idea, Friedrich Fröbel, and propagated his method in her book Für Deutsche Frauen. However, when Froebel fell out of favor with the Prussian government – allegedly the kindergartens spread socialist, liberal and atheistic sentiments – they distanced themselves from him, refused to collaborate in his magazine and only described herself as his admirer and not a student.

Her social commitment was unmistakable. The income from various books went to several charities, including the children's institution in Berlin, the Gesellenherbergsverein, the Invalids of the Saxon Army, the Invalids of the Prussian Army and the Victoria National Invalids Foundation.

She died on 1 April 1897, at the age of 86 in Dresden and was buried in the old Annenfriedhof. According to Death certificate StA Dresden II No. 792, she died on 2 April 1897.

== Achievements ==
Prussian ideals pervade her entire work and educated several generations of children and young people. Her best-known work is certainly her Daughter Album, which appeared annually as a periodical from 1855 with the subtitle: Conversations in domestic circles for the education of the mind and spirit of growing female youth. From 1856 another periodical Herzblästles pastime followed. Entertainment for little boys and girls to develop hearts and concepts.

== Quotes ==
Thekla von Gumpert describes her motives in a letter to Heinrich Schwerdt :

The purpose of my writing has always remained the same, valuing young people's literature only when it is used not for idle entertainment but as an educational tool, in such a way as to educate mind and heart and stimulate willpower and to seeks to guide. That's why I direct the eyes of the children, and especially the girls, to different circumstances in life to show them that a person can be and become happy in all situations, but that only conscientious faithfulness to duty in small and large matters can ensure this happiness. Such devotion to duty thrives on the soil of pious faith.

In her autobiography she writes:

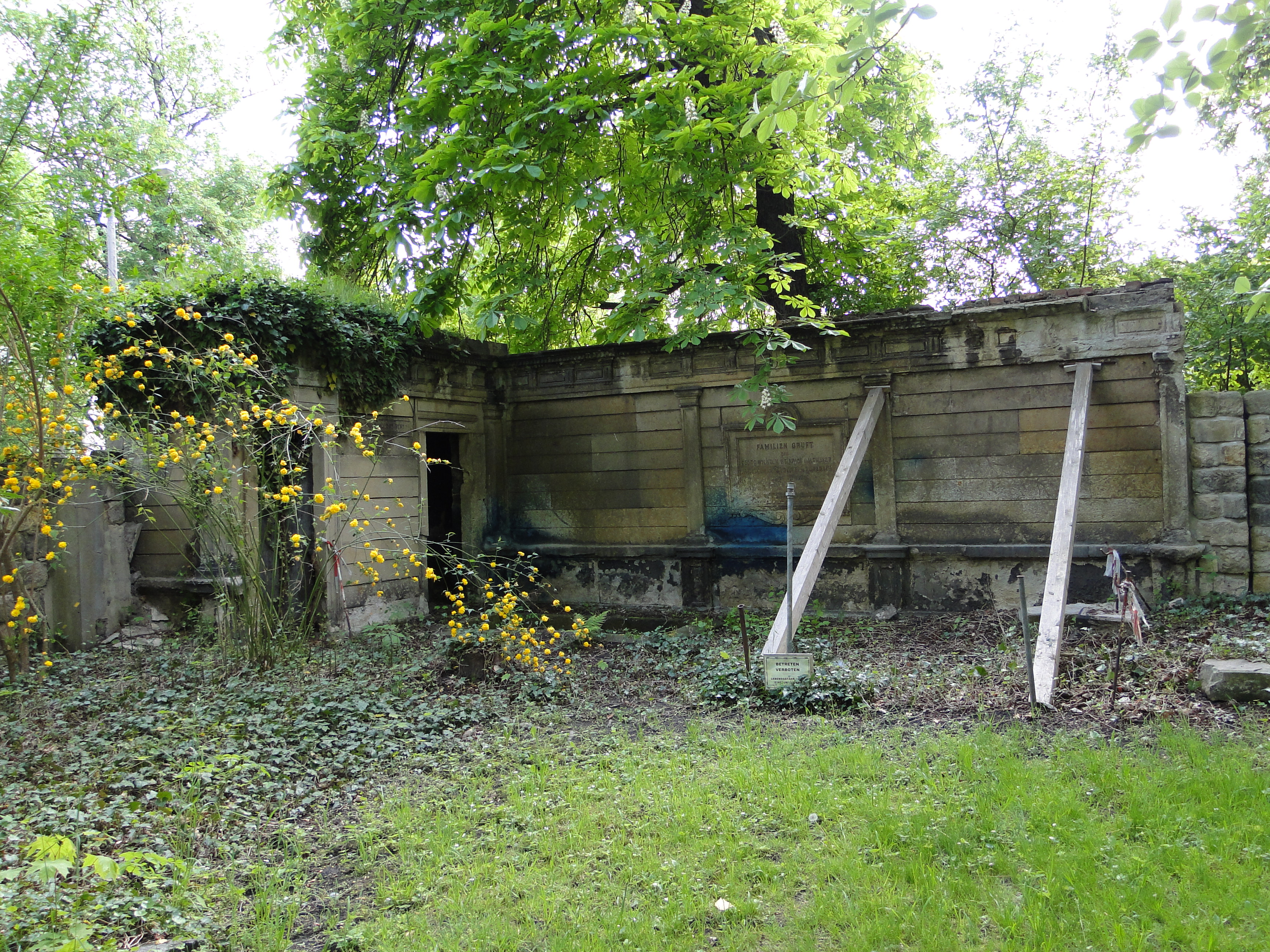
Grave of Thekla von Gumpert in the old Annenfriedhof in Dresden

My parents and ancestors were Prussians, and my father and mother put the consciousness into my heart that the King of Prussia was my King; "in the heart," I said, not just in the mind.

== Awards and honors ==
- 1889 Chiefakat Order III. class

== Selected works ==
- The little father and the grandchild, Duncker, Berlin 1843
- My first white hair, Duncker, Berlin.
- Robinson's Granddaughter, Duncker, Berlin 1844
- Tales from the world of children. 10 volumes. Hirt, Breslau 1847
  - 1. The Pauper or Pray and Work.
  - 2. Poke! thump! thump! or knock, and it shall be opened unto you.
  - 3. The Little Shoemaker or Where faithfulness takes root, God's blessing makes a tree out of it.
  - 4. Four weeks vacation or work is war against misery.
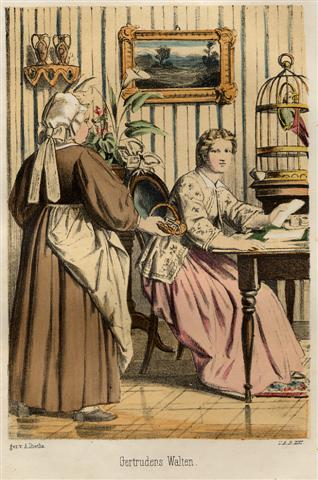
    From Daughters Album, Volume 14
    5. The Castle Nut
  - 6. & 7. The little heroes
  - 8. The mute child
  - 9. The man in the basket
  - 10. The emigrant's children
- Daughter album, published from 1855 to 1930 (volume 1 to 76), of which volume 1 to 43 by TvG
- Heart leaflet's pastime, from 1856 to 1933/1950 (volume 1 to 78) of which volume 1 to 42 by TvGFrom Daughters Album, Volume 14
- Castle Peter and Farmer's Little, Flemming, Glogau
- Mother Anne and her Gretchen, Flemming, Glogau 1867
- Mother Anne and her little hans, Flemming, Glogau 1886 2nd ed.
- The heart leaves, Flemming, Glogau from 1855 3? volumes
- God in nature. Hymns for Children. Duncker, Berlin 1849.
- Real pearls
- Good day
- God with us
- The Third of August, Glogau 1870
- Tales for my young friends, Glogau from 1876 2 vols.
- The Margaret book, Braunschweig 1876 2nd edition.
- For the nursery, Glogau from 1879 2 vols.
- Charity and Fatherland Love, Glogau 1882
- From Life, Glogau 1890
- The Year of Confirmation, Glogau 1891
- The Lord's Prayer, Bielefeld 1897
- The Advent Tree, Bielefeld 1897 3rd edition
- Among five kings and three emperors, Flemming, Glogau 1891
