= Maximilian Wolfgang Duncker =

German historian and politician (1811–1886)

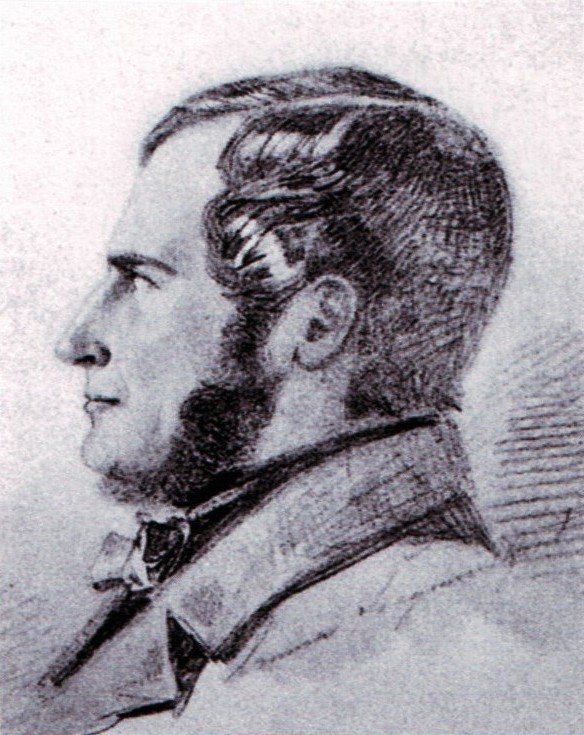
Maximilian Wolfgang Duncker

Maximilian Wolfgang Duncker (15 October 1811 – 21 July 1886) was a German historian and politician.

== Life ==
Duncker was born in Berlin, Province of Brandenburg, as the eldest son of the publisher Karl Duncker. He studied at the universities of Bonn and Berlin till 1834, was then accused of participation in the students' societies, which the government was endeavouring to suppress, and was condemned to six years' imprisonment, afterwards reduced to six months. He had already begun his labours as a historian, but after serving his sentence in 1837, found himself debarred till 1839 from completing his course at Halle, where in 1842 he obtained a professorship.

Elected to the Frankfurt Parliament in 1848, he joined the Right Centre Party, and was chosen reporter of the projected constitution. He sat in the Erfurt assembly in 1850, and in the second Prussian chamber from 1849 to 1852. During the crisis in Schleswig and Holstein in 1850 he endeavoured in person to aid the duchies in their struggles. An outspoken opponent of the policy of Manteuffel, he was refused promotion by the Prussian government, and in 1857 accepted the professorship of history at Tübingen. In 1859, however, he was recalled to Berlin as assistant in the ministry of state in the cabinet of Charles Anthony, Prince of Hohenzollern. At that time, Rudolf von Auerswald, a minister without portfolio, led the government in all but name. In 1861 was appointed councillor to the crown prince. In 1867 he became director of the Prussian archives, with which it was his task to incorporate those of Hanover, Hesse and Nassau. He retired on 1 January 1875, and died at Ansbach.

== Legacy ==
Duncker's eminent position among German historians rests mainly on his "Geschichte des Alterthums" (1st edition, 1852–1857; English translation by Evelyn Abbott, 1877–1882). He edited, with J.G. Droysen, "Preussische staatsschriften aus der regierungszeit König Friedrichs II", and "Urkunden und Actenstucke zur Geschichte des Kurfürsten Friedrich Wilhelm von Brandenburg". To the period of his political activity belong:

- Zur Geschichte der deutschen Reichsversammlung in Frankfurt (1849).
- Heinrich von Gagern: eine biographische Skizze (1850), in the series of Männer der Gegenwart.
- Vier Monate auswärtiger Politik (1851); anonymous, attributed to Max Duncker.

His other works include:

- Origines Germanicae. Commentatio prima (1840).
- Die Krisis der Reformation ein Vortrag in der Versammlung der protestantischen Freunde zu Halle am 6. August (1845), lecture.
- Feudalität und Aristokratie (1858).
- Aus der Zeit Friedrichs des Grossen und Friedrich Wilhelms III. Abhandlungen zur preussischen Geschichte (1876).
- Abhandlungen aus der griechischen Geschichte and Abhandlungen aus der neueren Geschichte (1887), both works published after his death.
