= Max Hirsch (labor economist) =

German economist and politician

Portrait of Max Hirsch

Max Hirsch (30 December 1832 Halberstadt – 26 June 1905 Bad Homburg vor der Höhe) was a German political economist and politician.

== Biography ==
He studied political economy and jurisprudence at the universities of Tübingen, Heidelberg, and Berlin, and then traveled through France and North Africa. As the result of his observations during these travels, he published: Skizze der volkswirtschaftlichen Zustände in Algerien (Sketch of socioeconomic conditions in Algeria, 1857), and Reise in das Innere von Algerien, durch die Kabylie und Sahara (A trip through the interior of Algeria, and through the Kabylie and Sahara, 1862). After a later journey through England and Scotland he returned home to organize trade unions among his countrymen. These soon spread all over Germany and, through them and their publication, Der Gewerkverein, he wielded great influence. He was several times a member of the Reichstag and was the leading spirit in a number of societies for the benefit of the laboring classes. His publications include: Was bezwecken die Gewerkvereine? (What are the aims of the labor unions?, 15th ed. 1891) and Das Invaliditäts- und Altersversicherungsgesetz (The law for invalids and the elderly, 3d ed. 1890).

== Selected works ==
- Skizze der volkswirthschaftlichen Zustände von Algerien. Mit Rücksicht auf die deutsche Auswanderung. Georg H. Wigand, Göttingen 1857. Digitalisat
- Reise in das Innere von Algerien durch die Kabylie und Sahara. Grote, Hamm 1862. Digitalisat
- Die gegenseitigen Hülfskassen und die Gesetzgebung. Mit dem Gutachten über die Gesetzentwürfe des Reichskanzleramtes und den formulirten Gesetzentwürfen des Verfassers. Franz Dunker, Berlin 1875.
- Was bezwecken die Gewerkvereine? Ein Mahn- und Merkwort für alle deutschen Handwerker und Arbeiter. Selbstverlag des Verbandes der Deutschen Gewerkvereine, Berlin 1880. Digitalisat Staatsbibliothek Berlin (15. Auflage 1891)
- Die deutschen Gewerkvereine und ihr neuester Gegner. Zur Abwehr gegen die Angriffe des Herrn Prof. L. Brentano und zur Aufklärung über die Geschichte und Leistungen der Gewerkvereine. E. Staude, Berlin 1879.
- Die hauptsächlichen Streitfragen der Arbeiterbewegung. Steinitz & Fischer, Berlin 1886.
- Arbeiterschutz insbesondere Maximalarbeitstag vom Standpunkte der Deutschen Gewerkvereine. Walther & Apolant, Berlin 1890. Digitalisat FES
- Die Arbeiterschutz-Gesetzgebung. Leopold Freund, Breslau 1891. Digitalisat MDZ Reader
- Die Arbeiter-Bewegung und Organisation in Deutschland. Volks-Zeitung Verlag, Berlin 1892.
- Leitfaden mit Muster-Statuten für freie Hülfskassen. J. Heine Verlag, Berlin 1892. Humboldt Universität Berlin Digitalisat
- Die Arbeiterfrage und die Deutschen Gewerkvereine. Festschrift zum 25-jährigen Jubiläum der Deutscher Gewerkvereine (Hirsch-Duncker). C. L. Hirschfeld, Leipzig 1893. Digitalisat MDZ Reader
- Die Entwicklung der Arbeiterberufsvereine in Grossbritannien und Deutschland. Hermann Bahr, Berlin 1896 Digitalisat Internet Archive
- Thätigkeit und Entwicklung der Deutschen Gewerkvereine (Hirsch-Duncker) und ihres Verbandes. Bericht insbesondere für die Jahre 1898 bis 1901 erstattet auf dem 14. Verbandstage zu Köln a.Rh. am 27. Mai 1901. Berlin 1901.
- Volkshochschulen. Ihre Ziele, Organisation, Entwicklung, Propaganda. G. Reimer, Berlin 1901.
- Der gesetzliche Arbeiterschutz im Deutschen Reiche. Zusammengefügt und kurz erläutert. Verband der Deutschen Gewerkvereine, Berlin 1903.
