= Schubert Monument, Vienna =

Schubert Monument
- Schubert-Denkmal
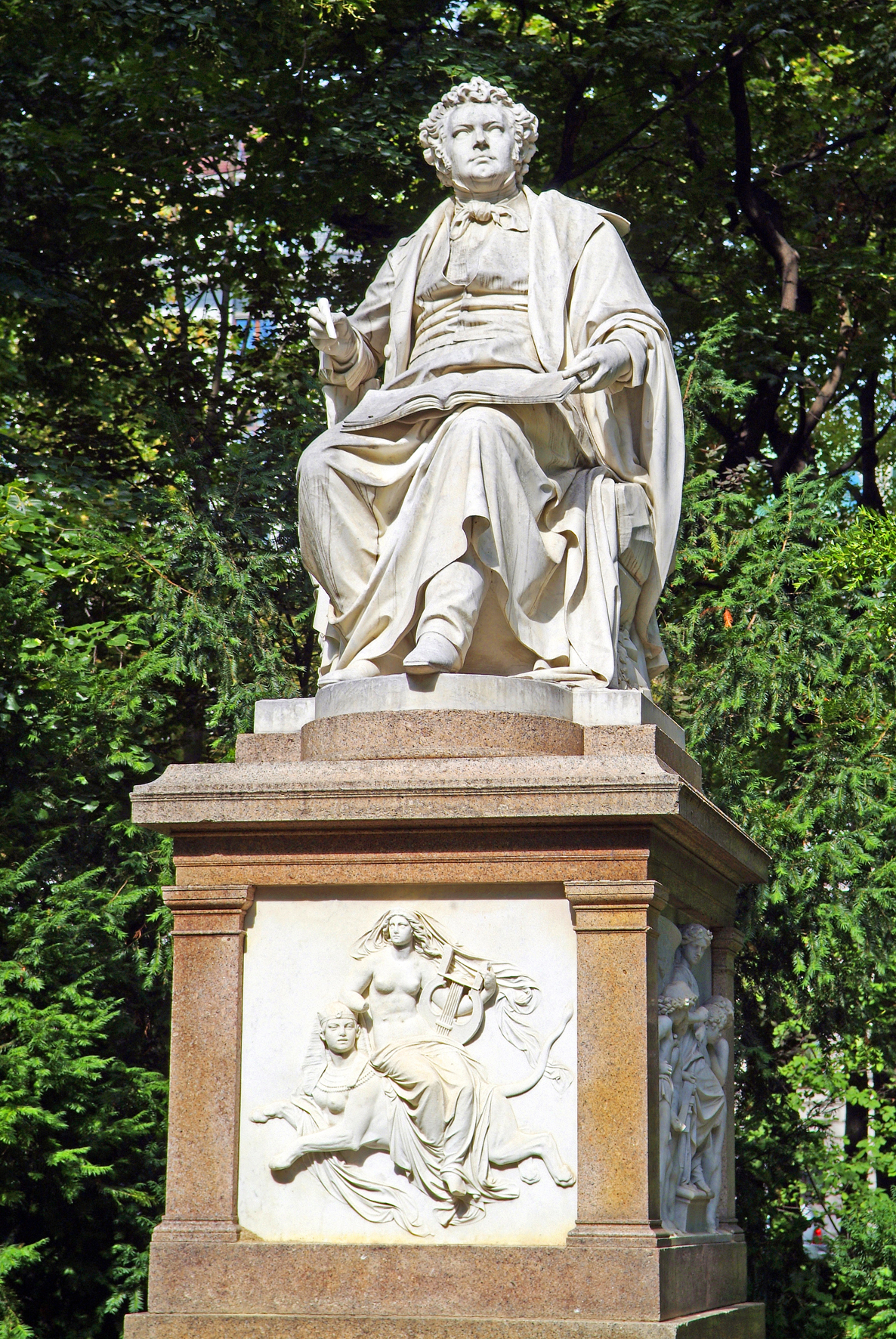
- Interactive map of the Schubert Monument area

General information
- Location: Stadtpark, Vienna, Austria
- Coordinates: 48°12′20.6″N 16°22′46.91″E
- Inaugurated: 15 May 1872

The Schubert Monument, a statue in the Stadtpark in Vienna, Austria, is a memorial to the composer Franz Schubert (1797–1828), unveiled in 1872.

== History ==
In 1862 the Wiener Männergesang-Verein ("Vienna Men's Choral Society") set up a fund for the erection of a monument to Schubert. Funds were raised during the following years, partly from concerts and from donations from other choral societies. After some discussion about the location of the memorial in the Stadtpark ("city park"), and whether it should be a statue or a portrait relief, the sculptor Carl Kundmann was commissioned to create the statue.

The painter, and a friend of Schubert, Moritz von Schwind, was responsible for the likeness of the portrayal. The pedestal, showing reliefs by Kundmann, was designed by Theophil Hansen. The statue was made of Carrara marble.

The foundation stone was laid in 1868, in the presence of the Mayor of Vienna, Andreas Zelinka.

The unveiling, on 15 May 1872, was attended by the Mayor of Vienna Cajetan von Felder, members of the Schubert family and associates. The speech was given by Nikolaus Dumba, an industrialist and patron of the arts.

== Description ==
The statue shows Schubert seated, with music paper on his knees and a pen in his hand. He has a pensive expression, as though thinking about a new composition.

The inscription reads: "Franz Schubert / Seinem Andenken / Der Wiener Männergesangsverein / MDCCCLXXII" ("Franz Schubert: to his memory. The Vienna Men's Choral Society, 1872"). The reliefs on the pedestal represent "Imagination" (on the front), "Instrumental music" (on the left) and "Vocal music" (on the right).
