= Franz Schubert =

Austrian composer (1797–1828)

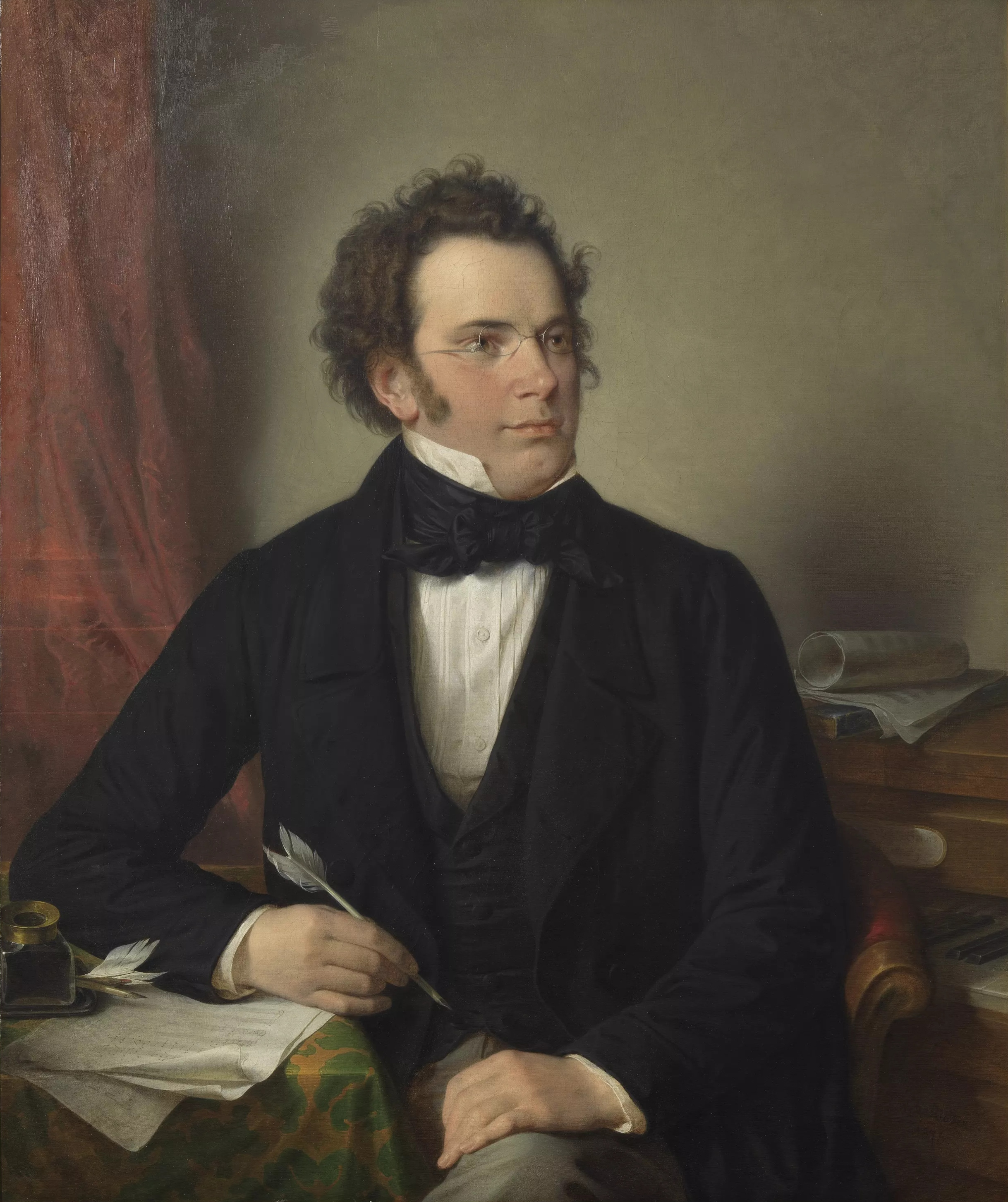
- 1875 portrait, after an 1825 original
- Born: 31 January 1797; Vienna
- Died: 19 November 1828 (aged 31); Vienna
- Occupation: Composer
- Works: List of compositions by Franz Schubert

Franz Peter Schubert (/ˈʃuːbərt/; German: [fʁants ˈpeːtɐ ˈʃuːbɐt]; 31 January 1797 – 19 November 1828) was an Austrian composer of the late Classical and early Romantic eras. He was immensely prolific despite living a short life, leaving behind a vast oeuvre of more than 1,000 compositions, including over 600 Lieder (art song in German) and other vocal works, seven complete symphonies, sacred music, operas, incidental music, and a large body of piano and chamber music. Among these are the songs "Gretchen am Spinnrade", "Erlkönig" and "Ave Maria"; the Trout Quintet; the Symphony in B minor, "Unfinished"; the Symphony in C major, "The Great"; the String Quartet No. 14 in D minor (Death and the Maiden); the String Quintet in C major; the Impromptus for solo piano; the last three piano sonatas; the Fantasia in F minor for piano four hands; the incidental music to the play Rosamunde; the song cycles Die schöne Müllerin and Winterreise; and the song collection Schwanengesang.

Born in the Himmelpfortgrund suburb of Vienna, Schubert showed uncommon gifts for music from an early age. His father gave him his first violin lessons and his elder brother gave him piano lessons, but Schubert soon surpassed their abilities. In 1808, at the age of eleven, he became a pupil at the Stadtkonvikt school, where he became acquainted with the orchestral music of Joseph Haydn, Wolfgang Amadeus Mozart, and Ludwig van Beethoven. He left the Stadtkonvikt at the end of 1813 and returned home to live with his father, where he began studying to become a schoolteacher. Despite this, he continued his studies in composition with Antonio Salieri and still composed prolifically. In 1821, Schubert was admitted to the Gesellschaft der Musikfreunde as a performing member, which helped establish his name among the Viennese citizenry. He gave a concert of his works to critical acclaim in March 1828, the only time he did so in his career. He died eight months later at the age of 31, the cause officially attributed to typhoid fever, but believed by some historians to be syphilis.

Appreciation of Schubert's music while he was alive was limited to a relatively small circle of admirers in Vienna, but interest in his work increased greatly in the decades following his death. Felix Mendelssohn, Robert Schumann, Franz Liszt, Johannes Brahms and other 19th-century composers discovered and championed his works. Today, Schubert is considered one of the greatest composers in the history of Western classical music and his music continues to be widely performed.

== Life and career ==
=== Early life and education ===
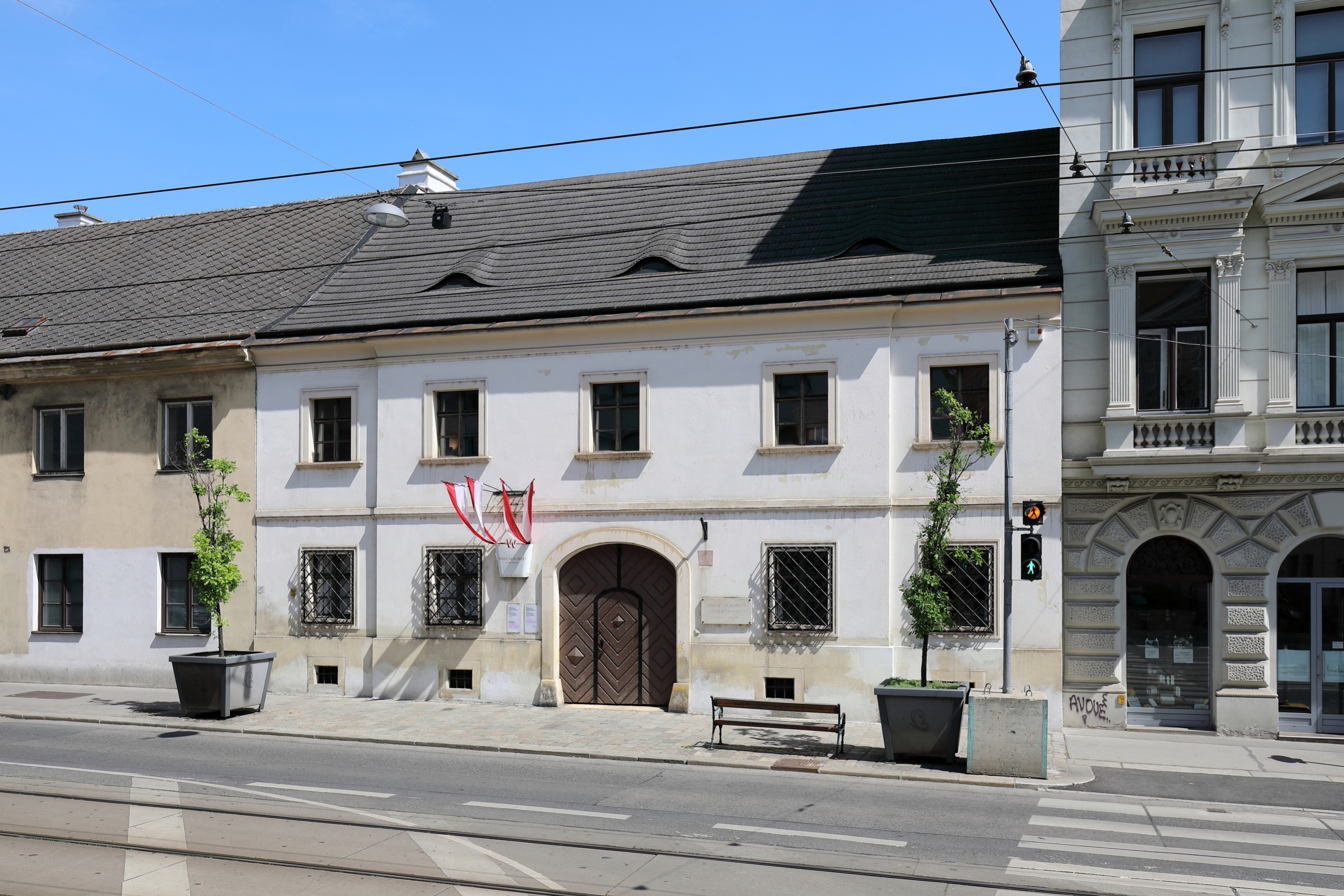
The house in which Schubert was born, today Nußdorfer Straße 54

Franz Peter Schubert was born in Himmelpfortgrund (now a part of Alsergrund), Vienna, Archduchy of Austria, on 31 January 1797, and baptized in the Catholic Church the following day. He was the twelfth child of Franz Theodor Florian Schubert (1763–1830) and Maria Elisabeth Katharina Vietz (1756–1812). Schubert's immediate ancestors came originally from the province of Zuckmantel in Austrian Silesia. His father, the son of a Moravian peasant, was a well-known parish schoolmaster, and his school in Lichtental (in Vienna's ninth district) had numerous students in attendance. He came to Vienna from Zuckmantel in 1784 and was appointed schoolmaster two years later. His mother was the daughter of a Silesian master locksmith and had been a housemaid for a Viennese family before marriage. Of Franz Theodor and Elisabeth's fourteen children (one of them illegitimate, born in 1783), only five survived to adulthood.

At the age of five, Schubert began to receive regular lessons from his father, and a year later he was enrolled at his father's school. Although it is not known exactly when he received his first musical instruction, he was given piano lessons by his brother Ignaz, but they lasted for a very short time as Schubert exceeded him within a few months. Ignaz later recalled:

I was amazed when Franz told me, a few months after we began, that he had no need of any further instruction from me, and that for the future he would make his own way. And in truth his progress in a short period was so great that I was forced to acknowledge in him a master who had completely distanced and outstripped me, and whom I despaired of overtaking.

When Schubert was eight years old, his father gave him his first violin lessons, training him to the point where he could play easy duets proficiently. Soon after, Schubert was given his first lessons outside the family circle by Michael Holzer, organist and choirmaster of the local parish church in Lichtental. In addition to instruction in piano and violin, Holzer gave the young Schubert lessons in organ, voice, harmony, and figured bass. Holzer later asserted that he did not give him any real instruction as Schubert would already know anything that he tried to teach him, recalling that he looked upon Schubert with "astonishment and silence". He also played viola in the family string quartet, with his brothers Ferdinand and Ignaz on first and second violin and his father on the cello. Schubert wrote his earliest string quartets for this ensemble. According to Ferdinand, Schubert also composed songs and piano pieces during this time, although none of these early compositions are known to have survived.

Young Schubert first came to the attention of Antonio Salieri, then Vienna's leading musical authority, in 1804, possibly at Holzer's recommendation. Salieri's previous pupils included Ludwig van Beethoven. In November 1808, he became a pupil at the Stadtkonvikt (Imperial Seminary) through a choir scholarship. At the Stadtkonvikt, he was introduced to the overtures and symphonies of Mozart, the symphonies of Joseph Haydn and his younger brother Michael Haydn, and the early overtures and symphonies of Beethoven, a composer for whom he developed the strongest admiration. His exposure to these and other works, combined with occasional visits to the opera, laid the foundation for a broader musical education. One important musical influence came from the songs by Johann Rudolf Zumsteeg, an important composer of Lieder. The precocious young student "wanted to modernize" Zumsteeg's songs, as reported by Joseph von Spaun, Schubert's friend. Schubert's friendship with Spaun began at the Stadtkonvikt and lasted throughout his short life. In those early days, the financially well-off Spaun furnished the impoverished Schubert with much of his manuscript paper.

In the meantime, Schubert's talent began to show in his compositions, including his earliest surviving piano work, an 1810 Fantasy for four hands in G major (D. 1), and his first Lied, Klagegesang der Hagar (D. 5), written a year later. A definitive transition in his life and education occurred in May 1812, when Schubert's mother died from typhoid fever. The following month, Salieri officially took Schubert as his private home student and gave him lessons twice a week in thoroughbass and composition. Musicologist Lorraine Byrne Bodley interprets the compositional output that followed his mother's death as his seeking "refuge from grief in hard and relentless work". A month after his mother's death, Schubert completed his first Salve Regina in F major (D. 27) for his local parish church, likely performed during a month's mind service for his mother. That same year, he also composed his first operatic work, Der Spiegelritter (D. 11), a Singspiel to a text by August von Kotzebue that he left incomplete. Meanwhile, at the Stadtkonvikt, Schubert was occasionally permitted to lead the Stadtkonvikt's orchestra, and Bodley writes that his earliest orchestral compositions were possibly conceived with this orchestra in mind, including his Symphony No. 1 in D major (D. 82), which he dedicated to Stadtkonvikt headmaster Franz Innocenz Lang.

=== Teacher at his father's school ===
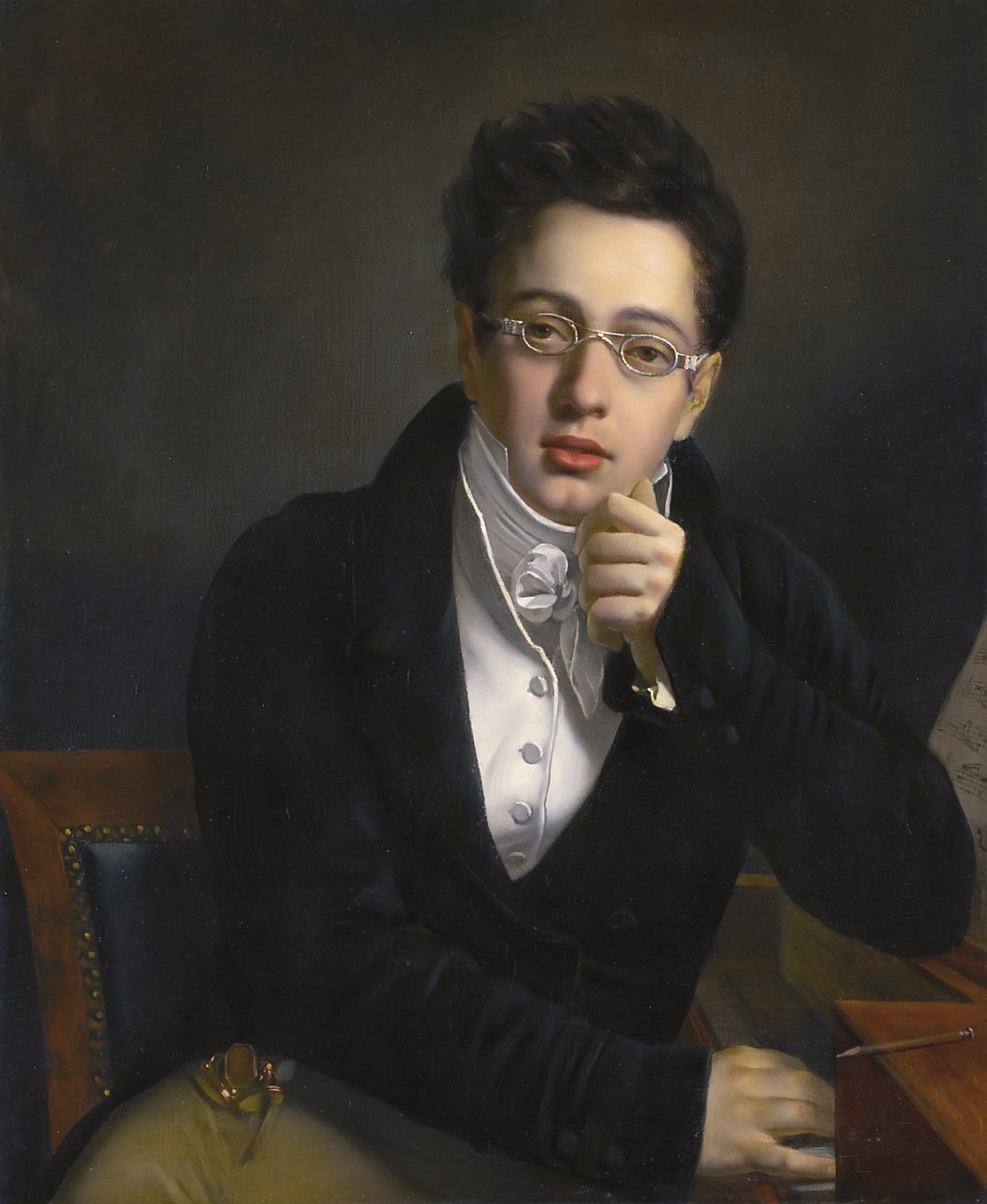
Possible portrait of the young Franz Schubert c. 1814, attributed to Josef Abel

In November 1813, Schubert left the Stadtkonvikt and returned home for teacher training at the St Anna Normal-hauptschule. In 1814, he entered his father's school as the teacher of the youngest pupils. Concurrently, Schubert continued to take private lessons in composition from Salieri, who provided him with more technical training than any of his other teachers, until they parted ways in 1817.

In 1814, Schubert met a young soprano named Therese Grob, daughter of a local silk manufacturer, and wrote several of his liturgical works (including a "Salve Regina" and a "Tantum Ergo") for her; she was also a soloist in the premiere of his Mass No. 1 (D. 105) in September 1814. Schubert wanted to marry her, but was hindered by the harsh marriage-consent law of 1815 requiring an aspiring bridegroom to show he had the means to support a family. In November 1816, after failing to gain a musical post in Laibach (now Ljubljana, Slovenia), Schubert sent Grob's brother Heinrich a collection of songs, which was retained by the family into the twentieth century.

One of Schubert's most prolific years was 1815. He composed over 20,000 bars of music, more than half of which were for orchestra, including nine church works, a symphony, and about 140 Lieder. In that year, he was also introduced to Anselm Hüttenbrenner and Franz von Schober, who would become his lifelong friends. Another friend, Johann Mayrhofer, was introduced to him by Spaun in 1815.

Throughout 1815, Schubert lived at home with his father. He continued to teach at the school and give private musical instruction, earning enough money for his basic needs, including clothing, manuscript paper, pens, and ink, but with little to no money left over for luxuries. Spaun was well aware that Schubert was discontented with his life at the schoolhouse, and was concerned for Schubert's development intellectually and musically. In May 1816, Spaun moved from his apartment in Landskrongasse (in the inner city) to a new home in the Landstraße suburb; one of the first things he did after he settled into the new home was to invite Schubert to spend a few days with him. This was probably Schubert's first visit away from home or school. Schubert's unhappiness during his years as a schoolteacher possibly showed early signs of depression, and it is virtually certain that Schubert suffered from cyclothymia throughout his life.

In 1989, the musicologist Maynard Solomon suggested that Schubert was erotically attracted to men, a thesis that has been heatedly debated. The musicologist and Schubert expert Rita Steblin has said that he was "chasing women". The theory of Schubert's sexuality or "Schubert as Other" has continued to influence current scholarship. The biographer Lorraine Byrne Bodley is sceptical "...of Solomon's 'outing' of Schubert, saying this misunderstands the passionate 'homosocial' friendships of 19th-century Europe."

=== Support from friends ===
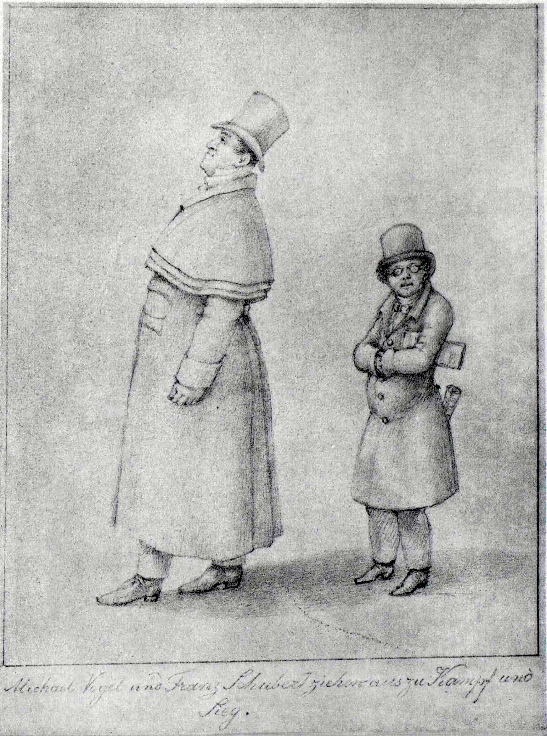
Caricature of Johann Michael Vogl and Franz Schubert by Franz von Schober (1825)

Significant changes occurred in Schubert's life in 1816 when Schober, a student from an affluent family, invited him to lodge at his mother's house. The proposal was particularly opportune, for Schubert had just made the unsuccessful application for the post of Kapellmeister at Laibach, and he had also decided not to resume teaching duties at his father's school. By the end of the year, he became a guest in Schober's lodgings. For a time, he attempted to increase the household resources by giving music lessons, but they were soon abandoned, and he devoted himself to composition. "I compose every morning, and when one piece is done, I begin another." During this year, he focused on orchestral and choral works, although he also continued to write Lieder. Much of this work was unpublished, but manuscripts and copies circulated among friends and admirers.

In early 1817, Schober introduced Schubert to Johann Michael Vogl, a prominent baritone twenty years Schubert's senior. Vogl, for whom Schubert went on to write a great many songs, became one of Schubert's main proponents in Viennese musical circles. Schubert also met Joseph Hüttenbrenner (brother of Anselm), who also played a role in promoting his music. These, and an increasing circle of friends and musicians, became responsible for promoting, collecting, and, after his death, preserving his work. Heinrich Anschütz wrote in his memoirs that Schubert was an active member of the 1817–1818 Unsinnsgesellschaft (Nonsenses Society), and various scholars agree with this.

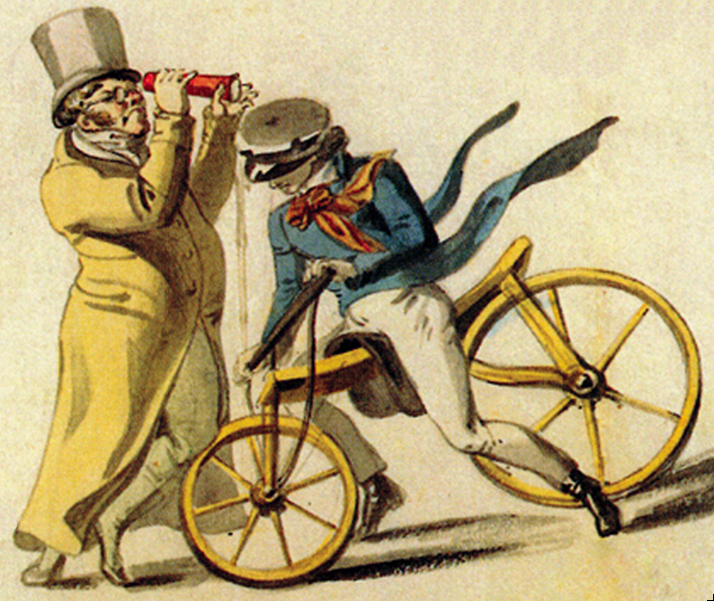
Das Kaleidoskop und die Draisine, Leopold Kupelwieser's caricature of himself and Franz Schubert for the Unsinnsgesellschaft (16 July 1818)

In late 1817, Schubert's father gained a new position at a school in Rossau, not far from Lichtental. Schubert rejoined his father and reluctantly took up teaching duties there. In early 1818, he applied for membership in the prestigious Gesellschaft der Musikfreunde, intending to gain admission as an accompanist, but also so that his music, especially the songs, could be performed in the evening concerts. He was rejected on the basis that he was "no amateur", although he had been employed as a schoolteacher at the time and there were professional musicians already among the society's membership. However, he began to gain more notice in the press, and the first public performance of a secular work, an overture performed in February 1818, received praise from the press in Vienna and abroad.

Schubert spent the summer of 1818 as a music teacher to the family of Count Johann Karl Esterházy at their château in Zselíz (now Želiezovce, Slovakia). The pay was relatively good, and his duties teaching piano and singing to the two daughters, Marie and Caroline, were relatively light, allowing him to compose happily. Schubert may have written his Marches Militaire in D major (D. 733 no. 1) for Marie and Caroline, in addition to other piano duets. On his return from Zselíz, he took up residence with his friend Mayrhofer.

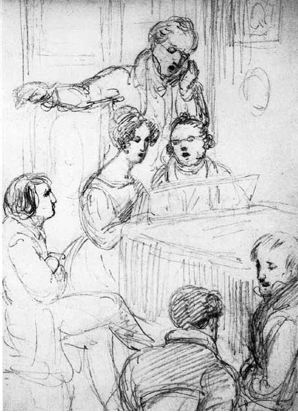
Sketch by Waldmüller of a trio of singers Josephine Fröhlich and Johann Michael Vogl with Schubert singing at the piano

During the early 1820s, Schubert was part of a close-knit circle of artists and students who had social gatherings together that became known as Schubertiads. Many of them took place in Ignaz von Sonnleithner's large apartment in the Gundelhof (Brandstätte 5, Vienna). The tight circle of friends with which Schubert surrounded himself was dealt a blow in early 1820. Schubert and four of his friends were arrested by the Austrian police who, in the aftermath of the French Revolution and Napoleonic Wars, were on their guard against revolutionary activities and suspicious of any gathering of youth or students. One of Schubert's friends, Johann Senn, was put on trial, imprisoned for over a year, and then permanently forbidden to enter Vienna. The other four, including Schubert, were "severely reprimanded", in part for "inveighing against [officials] with insulting and opprobrious language". While Schubert never saw Senn again, he did set some of his poems, Selige Welt (D. 743) and Schwanengesang (D. 744), to music. The incident may have played a role in a falling-out with Mayrhofer, with whom he was living at the time.

Schubert, who was only 1.52 m (5 feet) tall, was nicknamed "Schwammerl" by his friends, which Gibbs describes as translating to "Tubby" or "Little Mushroom". ("Schwamm" is "mushroom" in the Austrian and Bavarian dialects of German; the ending "-erl" makes it a diminutive.) Gibbs also claims he may have occasionally drunk to excess, noting that references to Schubert's heavy drinking "... come not only in later accounts, but also in documents dating from his lifetime."

=== Musical maturity ===
Schubert's compositions of 1819 and 1820 show a marked advance in development and maturity of style. He began the ultimately unfinished oratorio Lazarus (D. 689) in February 1820. This was later followed by the hymn "Der 23. Psalm" (D. 706), the octet "Gesang der Geister über den Wassern" (D. 714), the Quartettsatz in C minor (D. 703), the Wanderer Fantasy in C major for piano (D. 760), and additional smaller works. In 1820, two of Schubert's operas were staged: Die Zwillingsbrüder (D. 647) appeared at the Theater am Kärntnertor on 14 June, and Die Zauberharfe (D. 644) appeared at the Theater an der Wien on 21 August. Hitherto, his larger compositions (apart from his masses) had been restricted to the amateur orchestra at the Gundelhof (Brandstätte 5, Vienna), a society which grew out of the quartet-parties at his home. Now he began to assume a more prominent position, addressing a wider public. Publishers, however, remained distant, with Anton Diabelli hesitantly agreeing to print some of his works on commission. The first seven opus numbers, all songs, appeared on these terms; then the commission ceased, and he began to receive parsimonious royalties. The situation improved somewhat in March 1821 when Vogl performed the song "Erlkönig" (D. 328) at a concert that was extremely well received. That month, Schubert composed a Variation on a Waltz by Diabelli (D. 718), being one of the fifty composers who contributed to the Vaterländischer Künstlerverein publication.

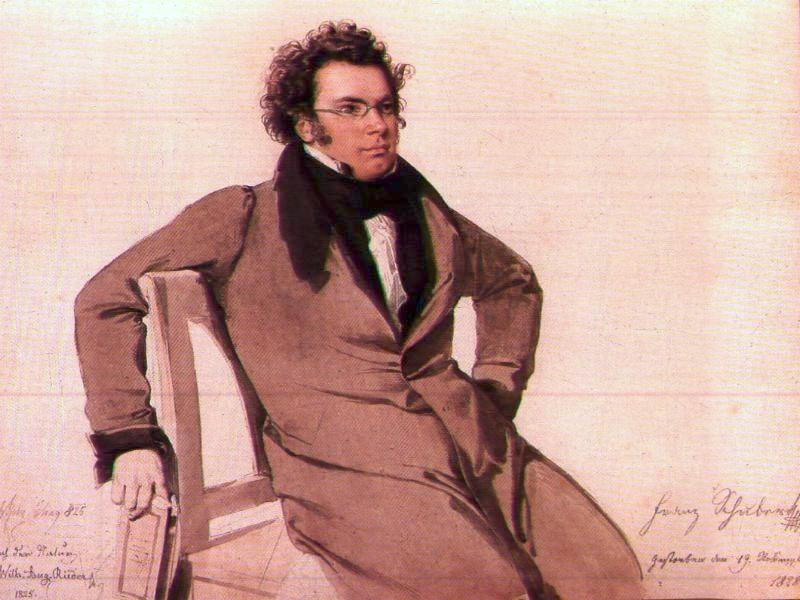
Watercolour of Franz Schubert by Wilhelm August Rieder (1825)

The production of the two operas turned Schubert's attention more firmly than ever in the direction of the stage, where, for a variety of reasons, he was almost completely unsuccessful. All in all, he embarked on twenty stage projects, each of them failures that were quickly forgotten. In 1822, Alfonso und Estrella was rejected, partly owing to its libretto, written by Schubert's friend Franz von Schober. In 1823, Fierrabras (D. 796) was rejected: Domenico Barbaia, impresario for the court theatres, largely lost interest in new German opera due to the popularity of Rossini and the Italian operatic style, and the failure of Carl Maria von Weber's Euryanthe. Die Verschworenen (The Conspirators, D. 787) was prohibited by the censor, apparently because of its title, and the play Rosamunde, Fürstin von Zypern, for which Schubert had written incidental music (D. 797), was withdrawn after two nights, due to the play's poor quality.

Despite his operatic failures, Schubert's reputation was growing steadily on other fronts. In 1821, the Gesellschaft der Musikfreunde finally accepted him as a performing member, and the number of performances of his music grew remarkably. These performances helped Schubert's reputation grow rapidly among the members of the Gesellschaft and established his name. Some of the members of the Gesellschaft, most notably Ignaz von Sonnleithner and his son Leopold von Sonnleithner, had a sizeable influence on the affairs of the society, and as a result of that and of Schubert's growing reputation, his works were included in three major concerts of the Gesellschaft in 1821. In April, one of his male-voice quartets was performed, and in November, his Overture in E minor (D. 648) received its first public performance; at a different concert on the same day as the premiere of the Overture, his song Der Wanderer (D. 489) was performed.

In 1822, Schubert made the acquaintance of both Weber and Beethoven but little came of it in either case; however, Beethoven is said to have acknowledged the younger man's gifts on a few occasions. On his deathbed, Beethoven is said to have looked into some of the younger man's works and exclaimed: "Truly, the spark of divine genius resides in this Schubert!" Beethoven also reportedly predicted that Schubert "would make a great sensation in the world," and regretted that he had not been more familiar with him earlier; he wished to see his operas and works for piano, but his severe illness prevented him from doing so.

=== Last years and masterworks ===
Despite his preoccupation with the stage and subsequent official duties, Schubert wrote a significant amount of music during these years. He completed the Mass in A♭ major, (D. 678) in 1822, and later that year embarked suddenly on a work which, more decisively than almost any other in those years, showed his maturing personal vision, the Symphony in B minor, known as the Unfinished Symphony (D. 759). The reason he left it unfinished – after writing two movements and sketches some way into a third – continues to be discussed and written about, and it is also remarkable that he did not mention it to any of his friends, even though, as Brian Newbould notes, he must have felt thrilled by what he was achieving.

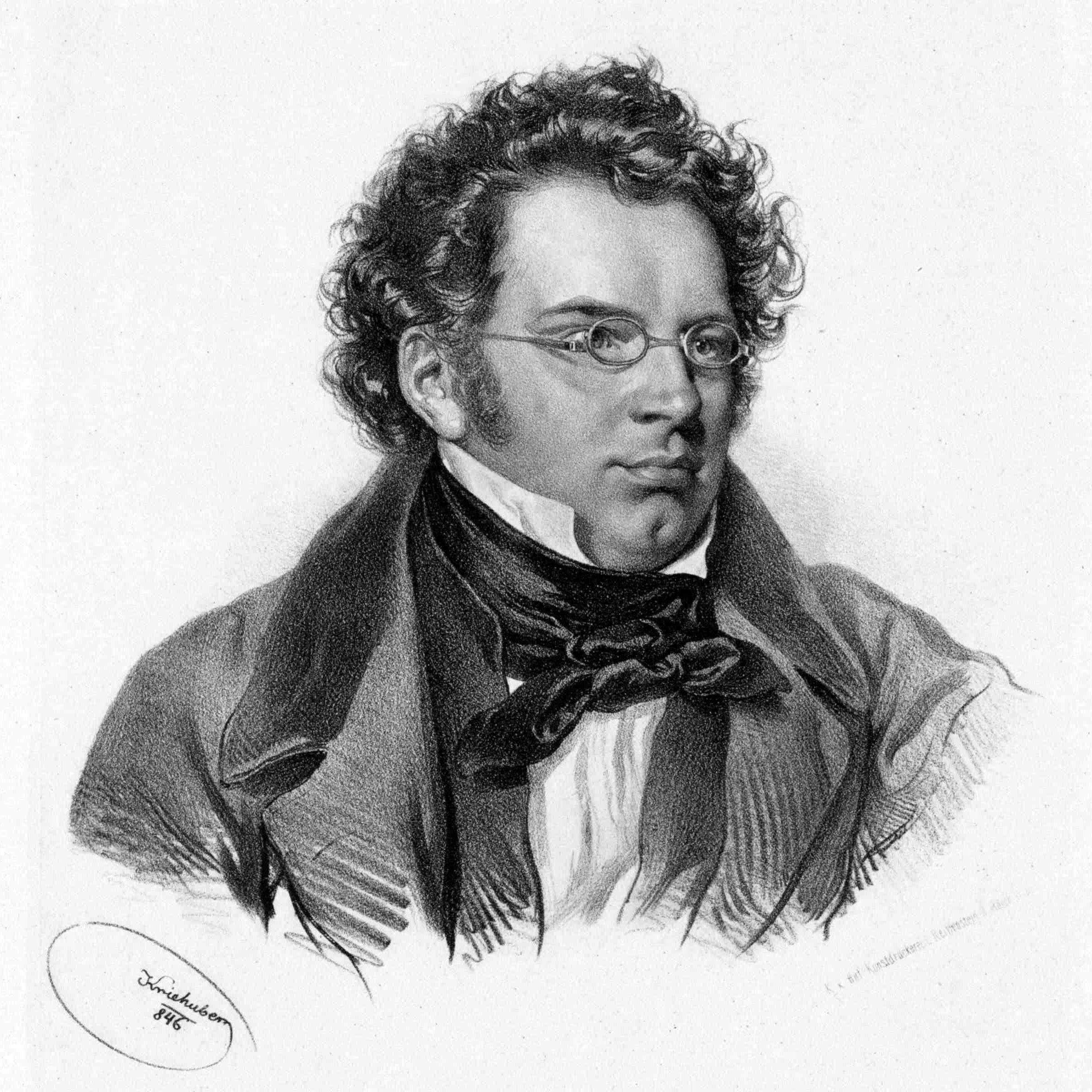
Franz Schubert by Josef Kriehuber (1846)

In 1823, Schubert wrote his first large-scale song cycle, Die schöne Müllerin (D. 795), setting poems by Wilhelm Müller. This work, together with the later cycle Winterreise (D. 911, also setting texts of Müller in 1827) is widely considered one of the pinnacles of Lieder. He also composed the song Du bist die Ruh' (You are rest and peace, D. 776) during this year. Also in that year, symptoms of syphilis first appeared.

In 1824, he composed the Variations in E minor for flute and piano based on Trockne Blumen—a song from Die schöne Müllerin—as well as several string quartets. He also wrote the Sonata in A minor for arpeggione and piano (D. 821) at a time when there was a minor craze over that instrument. In the spring of that year, he wrote the Octet in F major (D. 803) and a sketch for a "Grand Symphony," and in the summer went back to Zseliz. There, he became attracted to Hungarian musical idioms and wrote the Divertissement à la hongroise in G minor for piano duet (D. 818) and the String Quartet in A minor Rosamunde (D. 804). It has been said that he held a hopeless passion for his pupil, the Countess Caroline Esterházy, but the only work that bears a dedication to her is his Fantasia in F minor for piano duet (D. 940). This dedication, however, can only be found in the first edition and not in Schubert's autograph. His friend Eduard von Bauernfeld penned the following verse, which appears to reference Schubert's unrequited sentiments:

In love with a Countess of youthful grace,
—A pupil of Galt's; in desperate case
Young Schubert surrenders himself to another,
And fain would avoid such affectionate pother

The setbacks of previous years were compensated by the prosperity and happiness of 1825. Publication had been moving more rapidly, the stress of poverty was for a time lightened, and in the summer he had a pleasant holiday in Upper Austria where he was welcomed with enthusiasm. It was during this tour that he produced the seven-song cycle Fräulein am See, based on Walter Scott's The Lady of the Lake, and including "Ellens Gesang III" ("Hymn to the Virgin") (D. 839, Op. 52, No. 6); the lyrics of Adam Storck's German translation of the Scott poem are now frequently replaced by the full text of the traditional Roman Catholic prayer Hail Mary (Ave Maria in Latin), but for which the Schubert melody is not an original setting. The original only opens with the greeting "Ave Maria", which also recurs only in the refrain. In 1825, Schubert also wrote the Piano Sonata in A minor (D. 845, first published as op. 42), and began the Symphony in C major (Great C major, D. 944), which was completed the following year.

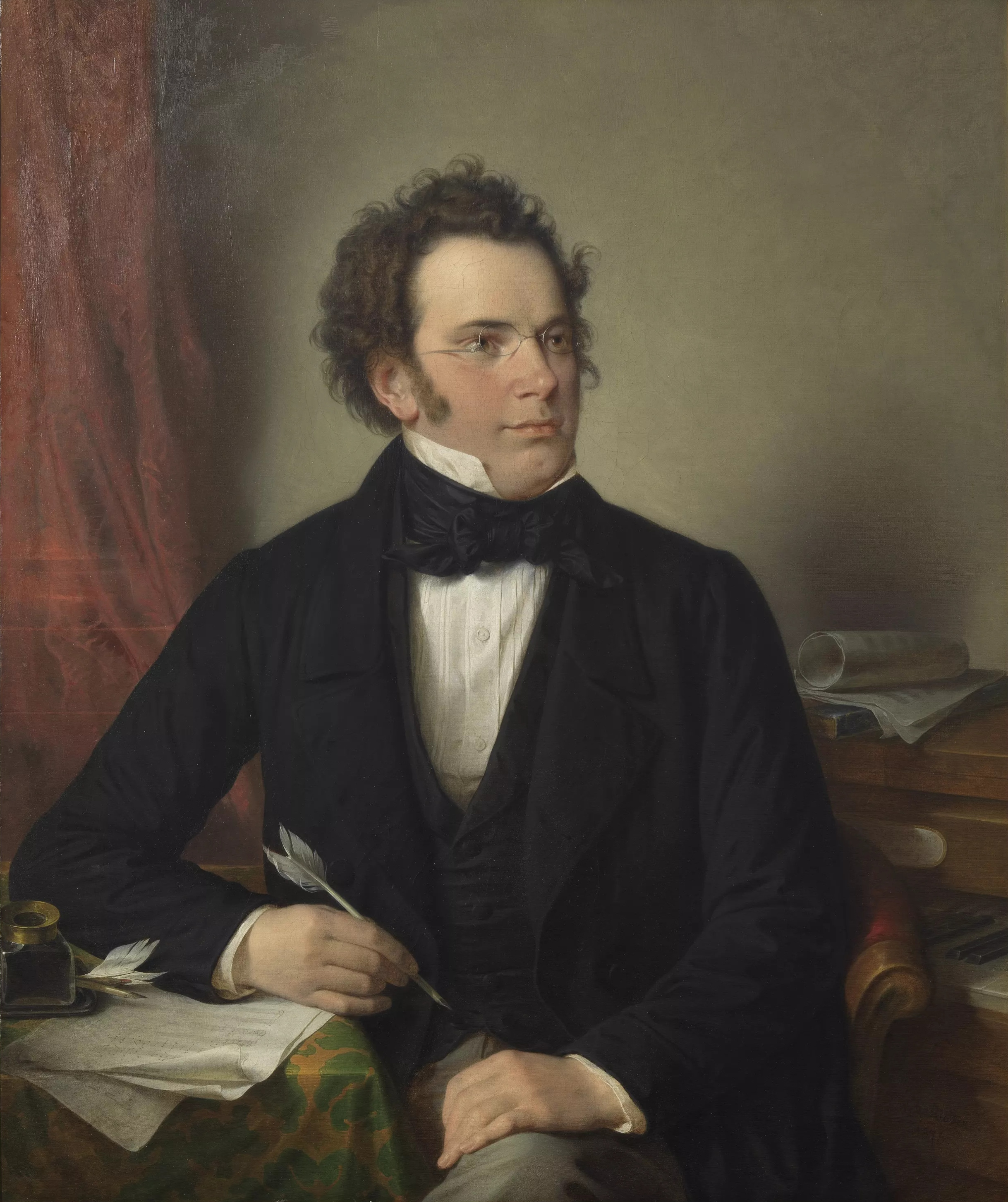
Wilhelm August Rieder: Oil painting, 1875, after Rieder's watercolor painting of 1825.

From 1826 to 1828, Schubert resided continuously in Vienna, except for a brief visit to Graz, Austria, in 1827. In 1826, he dedicated a symphony (D. 944, that later came to be known as the Great C major) to the Gesellschaft der Musikfreunde and received an honorarium in return. The String Quartet No. 14 in D minor (D. 810), with the variations on Death and the Maiden, was written during the winter of 1825–1826, and first performed on 25 January 1826. Later in the year came the String Quartet No. 15 in G major, (D. 887, first published as op. 161), the Rondo in B minor for violin and piano (D. 895), Rondeau brillant, and the Piano Sonata in G major, (D. 894, first published as Fantasie in G, op. 78). He also produced in 1826 three Shakespearean songs, of which "Ständchen" (D. 889) and "An Sylvia" (D. 891) were allegedly written on the same day; the former composed at a tavern where he broke his afternoon's walk, the latter on his return to his lodging in the evening.

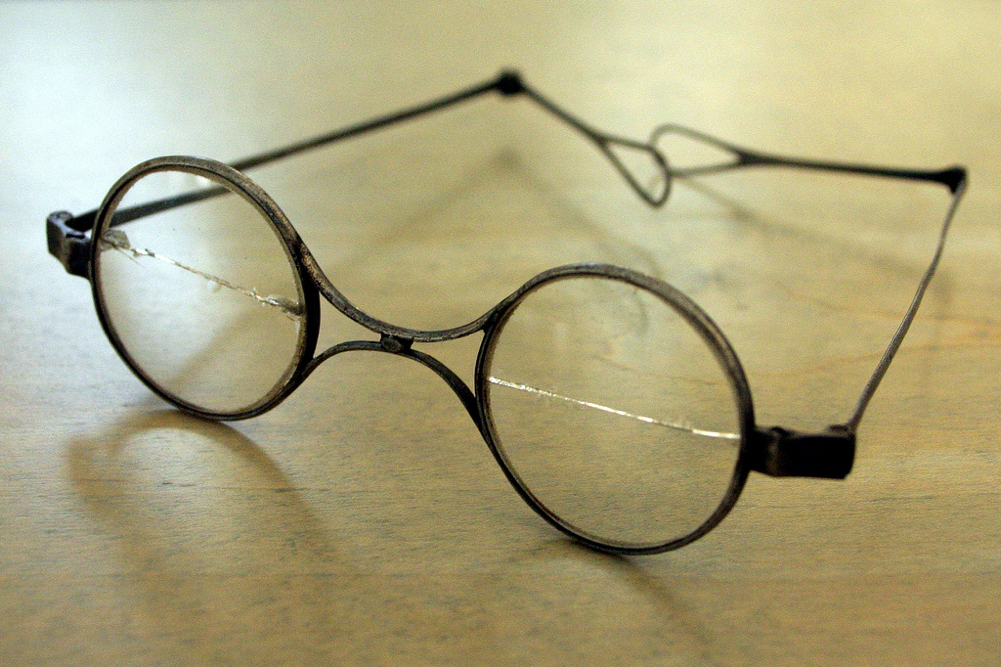
Schubert's glasses on display at the Schubert Geburtshaus

The works of his last two years reveal a composer entering a new professional and compositional stage. Although parts of Schubert's personality were influenced by his friends, he nurtured an intensely personal dimension in solitude; it was out of this dimension that he wrote his greatest music. The death of Beethoven affected Schubert deeply, and may have motivated Schubert to reach new artistic peaks. In 1827, Schubert wrote the song cycle Winterreise (D. 911), the Fantasy in C major for violin and piano (D. 934, first published as op. post. 159), the Impromptus (D. 899 and D. 935, two sets of four pieces in which the latter was published posthumously) for piano, and the two piano trios (the first in B♭ major (D. 898), and the second in E♭ major, (D. 929); in 1828 the cantata Mirjams Siegesgesang (Victory Song of Miriam, D. 942) on a text by Franz Grillparzer, the Mass in E♭ major (D. 950), the Tantum Ergo (D. 962) in the same key, the String Quintet in C major (D. 956), the second "Benedictus" to the Mass in C major (D. 961), the three final piano sonatas (D. 958, D. 959, and D. 960), and the collection 13 Lieder nach Gedichten von Rellstab und Heine for voice and piano, also known as Schwanengesang (Swan-song, D. 957). (This collection – which includes settings of words by Heinrich Heine, Ludwig Rellstab, and Johann Gabriel Seidl — is not a true song cycle like Die schöne Müllerin or Winterreise, as its songs were collected posthumously – Schubert might not have intended it as a song cycle.) The Great C major symphony is dated 1828, but Schubert scholars believe that it was largely written in 1825–1826 (being referred to while he was on holiday at Gastein in 1825—that work, once considered lost, is now generally seen as an early stage of his C major symphony) and was revised for prospective performance in 1828. The orchestra of the Gesellschaft reportedly read through the symphony at a rehearsal, but never scheduled a public performance of it. The reasons continue to be unknown, although the difficulty of the symphony is a possible explanation. In the last weeks of his life, he began to sketch three movements for a new Symphony in D major (D. 936A); In this work, he anticipates Gustav Mahler's use of folksong-like harmonics and bare soundscapes. Schubert expressed the wish, were he to survive his final illness, to further develop his knowledge of harmony and counterpoint, and had actually made appointments for lessons with the counterpoint master Simon Sechter.

On 26 March 1828, the anniversary of Beethoven's death, Schubert gave, for the only time in his career, a public concert of his own works. The concert was a success popularly and financially, although it was overshadowed by Niccolò Paganini's first appearances in Vienna shortly after.

=== Final illness and death ===
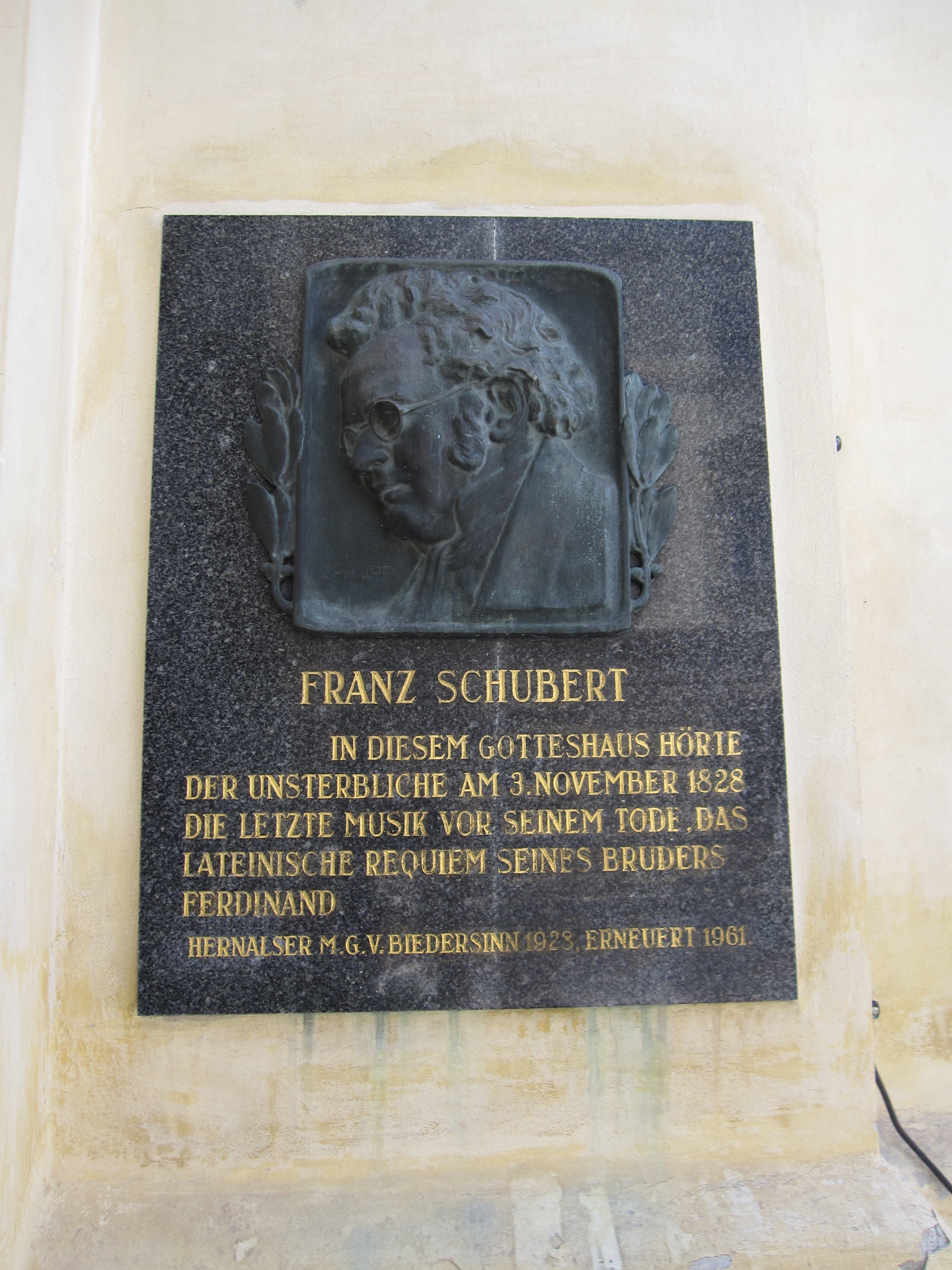
Memorial at the Kalvarienberg Church, Hernals

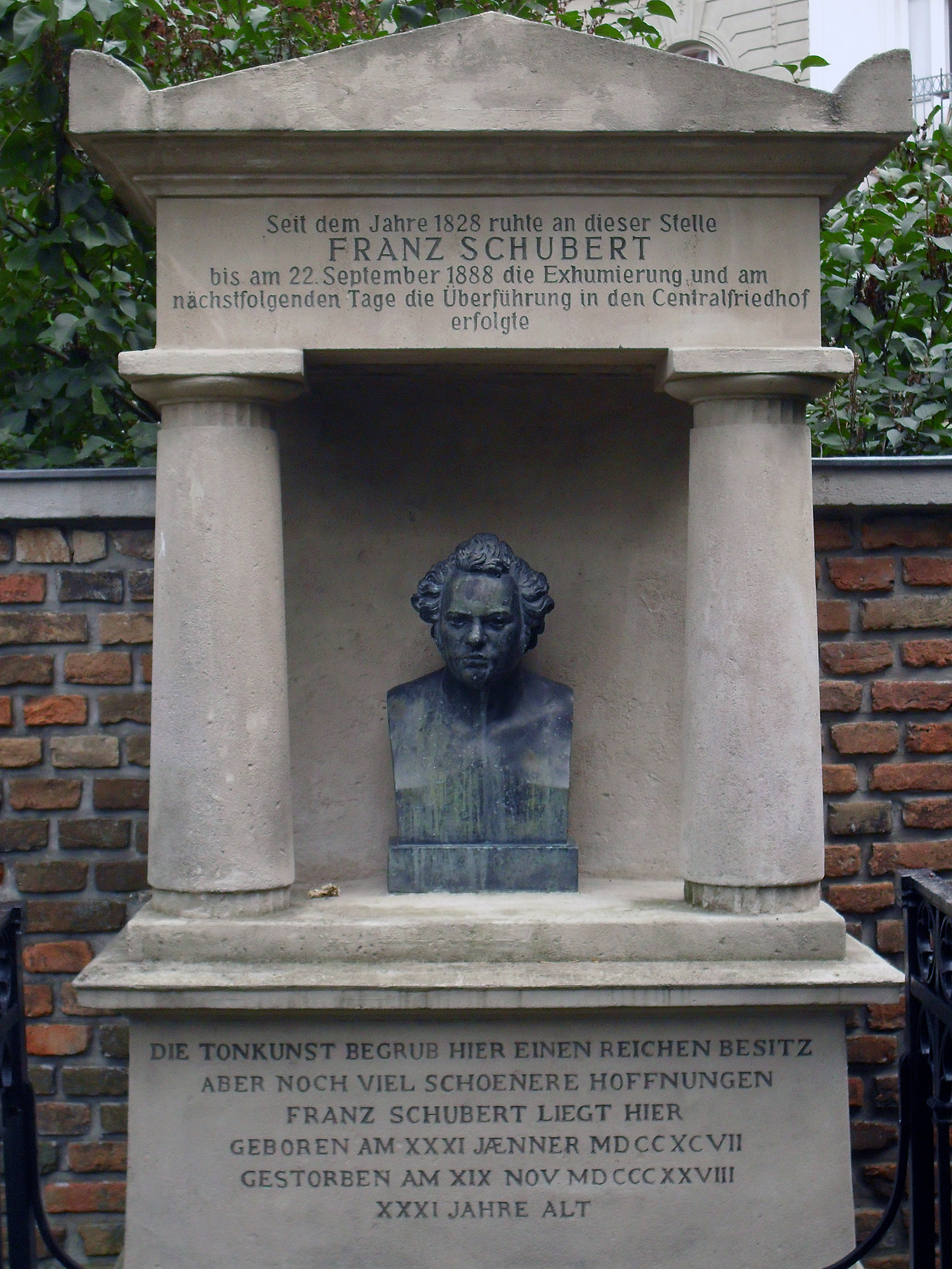
The site of Schubert's first tomb at Währing

In the midst of this creative activity, Schubert's health deteriorated. By the late 1820s, his health was failing and he confided to some friends that he feared that he was near death. In the late summer of 1828, he saw the physician Ernst Rinna, who may have confirmed Schubert's suspicions that he was ill beyond cure and likely to die soon. Some of his symptoms matched those of mercury poisoning (mercury was then a common treatment for syphilis, again suggesting that Schubert suffered from it). At the beginning of November, he again fell ill, experiencing headaches, fever, swollen joints, and vomiting. He was generally unable to retain solid food and his condition worsened. Five days before Schubert's death, his friend the violinist Karl Holz and his string quartet visited to play for him. The last musical work he had wished to hear was Beethoven's String Quartet No. 14; Holz commented: "The King of Harmony has sent the King of Song a friendly bidding to the crossing".

Schubert died in Vienna, aged 31, on 19 November 1828, at the apartment of his brother Ferdinand. The cause of his death was officially diagnosed as typhoid fever, though other theories have been proposed, including the tertiary stage of syphilis. The symptoms of his final illness, however, did not match those of tertiary syphilis (despite existing accounts from his friends indirectly suggesting that he had contracted the disease earlier). Six weeks before his death, he walked 68 km (42 miles) in three days, ruling out musculoskeletal syphilis. In the months before his death, he composed his last work, "Der Hirt auf dem Felsen", making neurosyphilis unlikely. Meningovascular syphilis is also unlikely because it presents a progressive stroke-like picture, and Schubert had no neurological manifestation until his final delirium, which started only two days before his death. Lastly, his final illness was characterized by gastrointestinal symptoms (namely vomiting). These issues all led Robert L. Rold to argue that (although he believed Schubert had syphilis), the fatal final illness was a gastrointestinal one such as salmonella or indeed typhoid fever. Rold also pointed out that during Schubert's final illness, his close friend Schober avoided visiting him "out of fear of contagion". However, Schober had known of his earlier possible syphilis and had never avoided Schubert in the past. Eva M. Cybulska goes further and says that Schubert's syphilis is a conjecture. His multi-system signs and symptoms, she says, could point towards a number of different illness such as leukaemia, anaemia, or Hashimoto's thyroiditis, and that many tell-tale signs of syphilis—chancre, mucous plaques, rash on the thorax, pupil abnormality, dysgraphia—were absent. She argues that the syphilis diagnosis originated with Schubert's biographer Otto Deutsch in 1907, based on the aforementioned indirect references by his friends, and uncritically repeated ever since.

At his own request, Schubert was buried near the grave of Beethoven (whom he had admired all his life) in the village cemetery of Währing on the edge of the Vienna Woods. A year earlier he had served as a torchbearer at Beethoven's funeral. In 1872, a memorial to Franz Schubert was erected in Vienna's Stadtpark. In 1888, both Schubert's and Beethoven's graves were moved to the Zentralfriedhof where they are next to the later graves of Johann Strauss II and Johannes Brahms. Anton Bruckner was present at both exhumations, and he reached into both coffins and held the revered skulls in his hands. The cemetery in Währing was converted into a park in 1925, called the Schubert Park, and his former grave site was marked by a bust. His epitaph, written by his friend the poet Franz Grillparzer, reads: Die Tonkunst begrub hier einen reichen Besitz, aber noch viel schönere Hoffnungen ("The art of music has here interred a precious treasure, but yet far fairer hopes").

== Music ==
Schubert was remarkably prolific, writing over 1,500 works in his short career. His compositional style progressed rapidly throughout his life. The largest number of his compositions are songs for solo voice and piano (roughly 630). Schubert also composed a considerable number of secular works for two or more voices, namely part songs, choruses and cantatas. He completed eight orchestral overtures and seven complete symphonies, in addition to fragments of six others. While he composed no concertos, he did write three concertante works for violin and orchestra. Schubert wrote a large body of music for solo piano, including eleven incontrovertibly completed sonatas and at least eleven more in varying states of completion, (Note: D 537, 568, 575, 664, 784, 845, 850, 894, 958, 959, 960 incontrovertibly complete; D 157, 279, 459, 557, 566 as further sonatas whose completeness has been debated; D 571, 613, 625, 655, 769A, 840 as further unfinished sonatas; and many other possible sonata fragments and isolated movements possibly associated with some of the above-listed sonatas.) numerous miscellaneous works and many short dances, in addition to producing a large set of works for piano four hands. He also wrote over fifty chamber works, including some fragmentary works. Schubert's sacred output includes seven masses, one oratorio and one requiem, among other mass movements and numerous smaller compositions. He completed only eleven of his twenty stage works.

=== Style ===
In July 1947 the Austrian composer Ernst Krenek discussed Schubert's style, abashedly admitting that he had at first "shared the wide-spread opinion that Schubert was a lucky inventor of pleasing tunes ... lacking the dramatic power and searching intelligence which distinguished such 'real' masters as J. S. Bach or Beethoven". Krenek wrote that he reached a completely different assessment after a close study of Schubert's pieces at the urging of his friend and fellow composer Eduard Erdmann. Krenek pointed to the piano sonatas as giving "ample evidence that [Schubert] was much more than an easy-going tune-smith who did not know, and did not care, about the craft of composition." Each sonata then in print, according to Krenek, exhibited "a great wealth of technical finesse" and revealed Schubert as "far from satisfied with pouring his charming ideas into conventional moulds; on the contrary he was a thinking artist with a keen appetite for experimentation."

Harold C. Schonberg writes that "Always the music is intensely, even piercingly melodic, the melodies often tinged with a kind of melancholy that can only be described as—well, as Schubertian. ... The slow movement of the B flat Trio contains a wonderful example of Schubert's magic in modulation. The music is going along in the key of A flat and by a twist the music is suddenly in a far remote E major. ... the effect is of the heavens opening up."

==== Instrumental music, stage works and church music ====
Arpeggione Sonata, D 821 (version for cello and piano): I. Allegro moderato
Hans Goldstein (cello) and Clinton Adams (piano)

Piano Sonata in B♭ major, D 960: I. Molto moderato
Randolph Hokanson, piano

Symphony No. 8 in B minor, D 759 ("Unfinished"): I. Allegro moderato
Fulda Symphonic Orchestra and Simon Schindler

That "appetite for experimentation" manifests itself repeatedly in Schubert's output in a wide variety of forms and genres, including opera, liturgical music, chamber and solo piano music, and symphonic works. Perhaps most familiarly, his adventurousness is reflected in his notably original sense of modulation; for example, the second movement of the String Quintet (D. 956), which is in E major, features a central section in the distant key of F minor. It also appears in unusual choices of instrumentation, as in the Sonata in A minor for arpeggione and piano (D. 821), or the unconventional scoring of the Trout Quintet (D. 667) for piano, violin, viola, cello, and double bass, whereas conventional piano quintets are scored for piano and string quartet.

Although Schubert was clearly influenced by the Classical sonata forms of Haydn, Mozart and Beethoven, his formal structures and his developments tend to give the impression more of melodic development than of harmonic drama. This combination of Classical form and long-breathed Romantic melody sometimes lends them a discursive style: his Ninth Symphony was described by Robert Schumann as running to "heavenly lengths".

==== Lieder and art songs ====
Schubert's most remarkable output was that of his Lied. Leon Plantinga remarks that "in his more than six hundred Lieder he explored and expanded the potentialities of the genre, as no composer before him." Prior to Schubert's influence, Lieder tended toward a strophic, syllabic treatment of text, evoking the folksong qualities engendered by the stirrings of Romantic nationalism. Antonín Dvořák wrote in 1894 that Schubert, whom he considered one of the truly great composers, was clearly influential on shorter works, especially Lieder and shorter piano works: "The tendency of the romantic school has been toward short forms, and although Weber helped to show the way, to Schubert belongs the chief credit of originating the short models of piano forte pieces which the romantic school has preferably cultivated.... Schubert created a new epoch with the Lied.... All other songwriters have followed in his footsteps."

Among Schubert's treatments of the poetry of Johann Wolfgang von Goethe, his settings of "Gretchen am Spinnrade" (D. 118) and "Der Erlkönig" (D. 328) are particularly striking for their dramatic content, forward-looking uses of harmony, and use of eloquent pictorial keyboard figurations, such as the depiction of the spinning wheel and treadle in the piano in "Gretchen" and the furious and ceaseless gallop in "Erlkönig". He composed music using the poems of myriad poets, with Goethe, Mayrhofer, and Schiller the most frequent, and others, including Heinrich Heine, Friedrich Rückert, and Joseph Freiherr von Eichendorff. Alex Ross writes of "Gretchen am Spinnrade", "The propulsive, repetitive piano accompaniment, an archetypal feat of tone painting, depicts the mechanical whirl of Gretchen's spinning wheel as she sings of her uneasy passion."

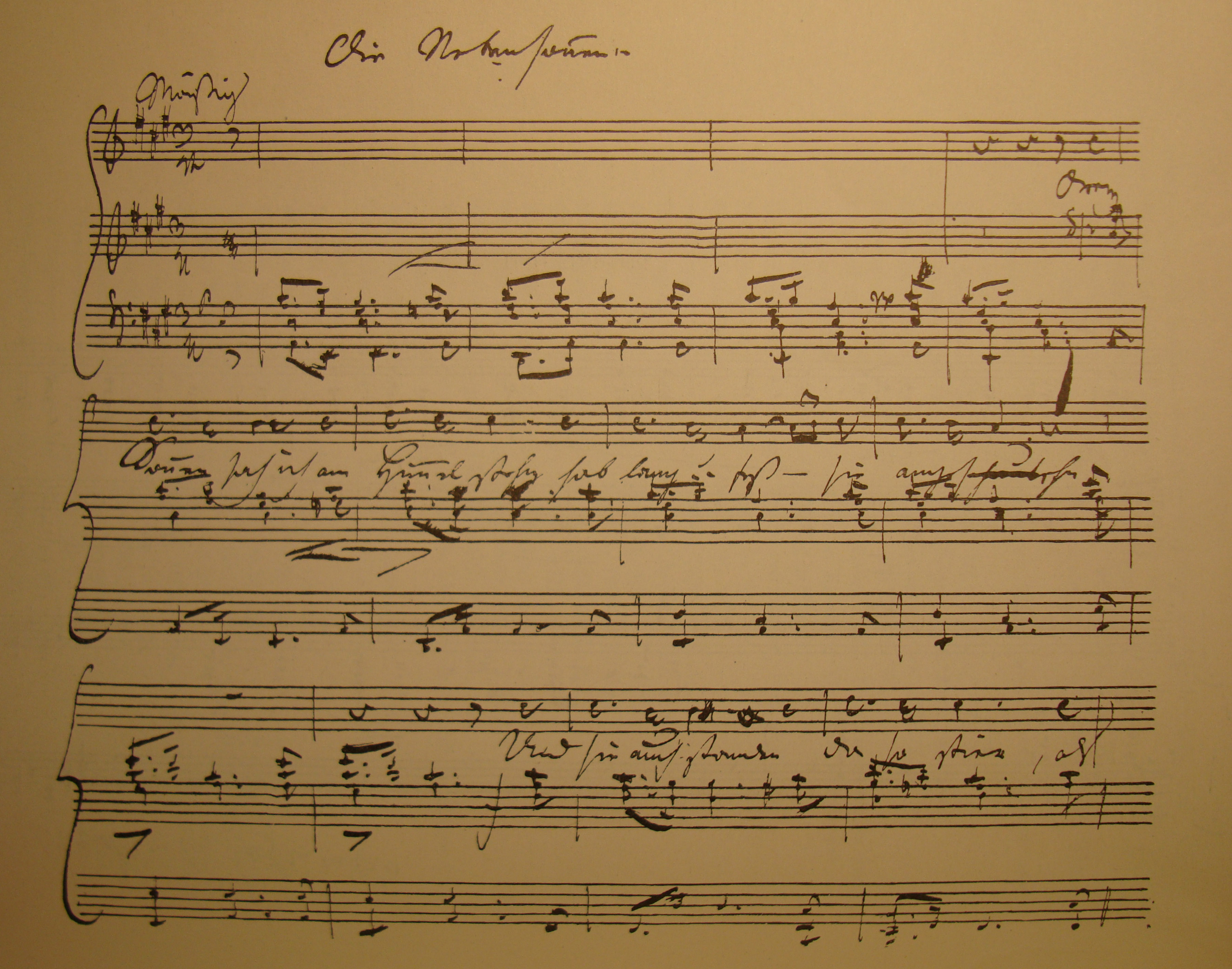
Autograph of Die Nebensonnen (The Sun dogs) from Winterreise

Of particular note are his two song cycles on the poems of Wilhelm Müller, Die schöne Müllerin and Winterreise, which helped to establish the genre and its potential for musical, poetic, and almost operatic dramatic narrative. The Wiener Theaterzeitung, writing about Winterreise at the time, commented that it was a work that "none can sing or hear without being deeply moved".

Scubert's last collection of songs, published in 1828 after his death, Schwanengesang, features poems by Ludwig Rellstab, Heine, and Johann Gabriel Seidl. Ross wrote about "Der Doppelgänger", a song from this collection: "the narrator sees his 'double' and feels he has become a ghost himself, watching his own ridiculous life. Setting the scene, Schubert writes an acutely unnerving progression in B minor in which each chord has been lobotomized by the surgical removal of one note."

=== Publication – catalogue ===
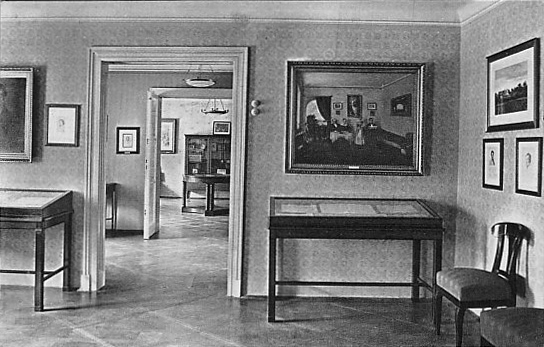
Interior of museum at Schubert's birthplace, Vienna, 1914

During Schubert's lifetime, he had around 100 opus numbers published, mainly songs, chamber music and smaller piano compositions. Following his death, publication of smaller pieces continued, including opus numbers up to 173 in the 1860s, 50 instalments with songs published by Diabelli and dozens of first publications by Peters, but the manuscripts of many of the larger-scale works remained hidden in cabinets and file boxes of Schubert's family, friends, and publishers. Even some of Schubert's friends were unaware of the full scope of what he wrote, and for many years he was primarily recognized as the "prince of song", although there was recognition of some of his larger-scale efforts. An important step towards the recovery of these works was the journey to Vienna made by the music historian George Grove and the composer Arthur Sullivan in October 1867. The travellers unearthed the manuscripts of six of the symphonies, parts of the incidental music to Rosamunde, the Mass No. 1 in F major (D. 105), and the operas Des Teufels Lustschloss (D. 84), Fernardo (D. 220), Der vierjährige Posten (D. 190), and Die Freunde von Salamanka (D. 326), and several other unnamed works. With these discoveries, Grove and Sullivan were able to inform the public of the existence of these works; in addition, they were able to copy the fourth and sixth symphonies, the Rosamunde incidental music, and the overture to Die Freunde von Salamanka. This led to more widespread public interest in Schubert's work.

==== Complete editions ====
From 1884 to 1897, Breitkopf & Härtel published Franz Schubert's Works, a critical edition including a contribution made, among others, by Johannes Brahms, who edited the first series containing eight symphonies. The publication of the Neue Schubert-Ausgabe by Bärenreiter started in the second half of the 20th century.

==== Deutsch catalogue ====
Since relatively few of Schubert's works were published in his lifetime, only a small number of them have opus numbers assigned, and even in those cases, the sequence of the numbers does not give a good indication of the order of composition. The Austrian musicologist Otto Erich Deutsch (1883–1967) is known for compiling the first comprehensive catalogue of Schubert's works. This was first published in English in 1951 (Schubert Thematic Catalogue) and subsequently revised for a new edition in German in 1978 (Franz Schubert: Thematisches Verzeichnis seiner Werke in chronologischer Folge – Franz Schubert: Thematic Catalogue of His Works in Chronological Order).

==== Numbering issues ====
Confusion arose quite early over the numbering of Schubert's late symphonies. Schubert's last completed symphony, the Great C major, D 944, was assigned the numbers 7, 8, 9 and 10, depending on publication. Similarly, the Unfinished D 759 has been indicated with the numbers 7, 8, and 9.

The order usually followed for these late symphonies by English-language sources is:

- No. 7: E major, D. 729
- No. 8: B minor, D. 759 Unfinished
- No. 9: C major, D. 944 Great C major
- No. 10: D major, D. 936A

An even broader confusion arose over the numbering of the piano sonatas, with numbering systems ranging from 15 to 23 sonatas.

=== Instruments ===
Among pianos Schubert had access to were a Benignus Seidner piano (now displayed at the Schubert Geburtshaus in Vienna) and an Anton Walter & Sohn piano (today in the collection of the Vienna Kunsthistorisches Museum). Schubert was also familiar with instruments by Viennese piano builder Conrad Graf. He appreciated the potential these early nineteenth-century instruments possessed for both intimate and extrovert, virtuosic playing.

== Recognition ==
A feeling of regret for the loss of potential masterpieces caused by Schubert's early death at age 31 was expressed in the epitaph on his large tombstone written by Grillparzer: "Here music has buried a treasure, but even fairer hopes." A similar view was expressed by, among others, pianist Radu Lupu, who said: "[Schubert] is the composer for whom I am really most sorry that he died so young", before pointing out Schubert's desire to further expand his knowledge of counterpoint.

However, others have expressed disagreement with this early view. For instance, Robert Schumann said: "It is pointless to guess at what more [Schubert] might have achieved. He did enough; and let them be honoured who have striven and accomplished as he did". and the pianist András Schiff said that: "Schubert lived a very short life, but it was a very concentrated life. In 31 years, he lived more than other people would live in 100 years, and it is needless to speculate what could he have written had he lived another 50 years. It's irrelevant, just like with Mozart: these are the two natural geniuses of music."

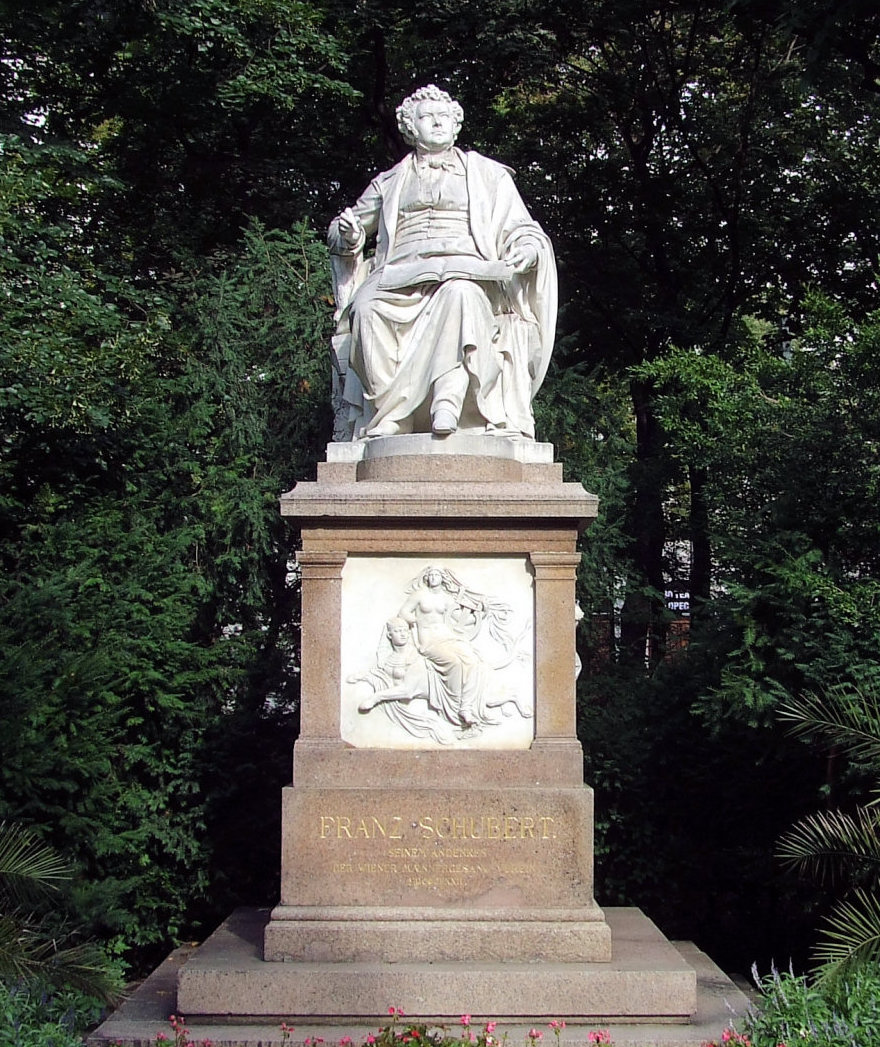
The Schubert Denkmal

The Wiener Schubertbund, one of Vienna's leading choral societies, was founded in 1863, whilst the Gründerzeit was taking place. The Schubertbund quickly became a rallying point for schoolteachers and other members of the Viennese middle class who felt increasingly embattled during the Gründerzeit and the aftermath of the Panic of 1873. In 1872, the dedication of the Schubert Denkmal, a gift to the city from Vienna's leading male chorus, the Wiener Männergesang-Verein, took place; the chorus performed at the event. The Denkmal was designed by Austrian sculptor Carl Kundmann and is located in Vienna's Stadtpark.

Schubert's chamber music continues to be popular. In a survey conducted by the ABC Classic FM radio station in 2008, Schubert's chamber works dominated the field, with the Trout Quintet ranked first, the String Quintet in C major ranked second, and the Notturno in E♭ major for piano trio ranked third. Furthermore, eight more of his chamber works were among the 100 ranked pieces: both piano trios, the String Quartet No. 14 (Death and the Maiden), the String Quartet No. 15, the Arpeggione Sonata, the Octet, the Fantasie in F minor for piano four-hands, and the Adagio and Rondo Concertante for piano quartet.

The New York Times' music critic Anthony Tommasini ranked Schubert as the fourth greatest composer (after Bach, Beethoven, and Mozart), writing:

You have to love the guy, who died at 31, ill, impoverished and neglected except by a circle of friends who were in awe of his genius. For his hundreds of songs alone—including the haunting cycle Winterreise, which will never release its tenacious hold on singers and audiences—Schubert is central to our concert life. The baritone Sanford Sylvan once told me that hearing the superb pianist Stephen Drury give searching accounts of the three late Schubert sonatas on a single program was one of the most transcendent musical experiences of his life. Schubert's first few symphonies may be works in progress. But the "Unfinished" and especially the Ninth Symphony are astonishing. The Ninth paves the way for Bruckner and prefigures Mahler.

Harold Schonberg calls him "the first lyric poet of music."

=== Tributes by other musicians ===
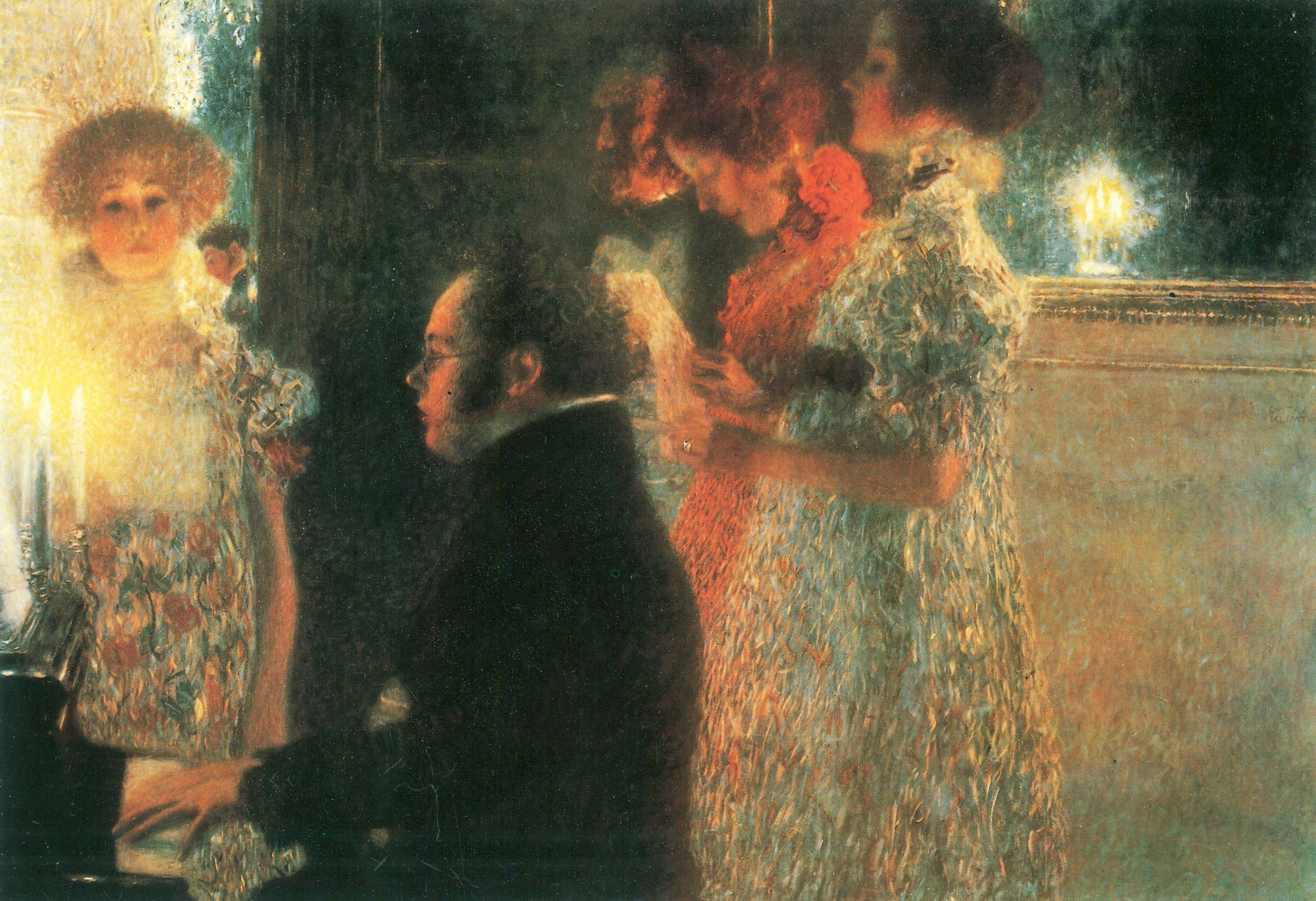
Schubert at the Piano by Gustav Klimt (1899)

From the 1830s through the 1870s, Franz Liszt transcribed and arranged several of Schubert's works, particularly his songs. Liszt, who was a significant force in spreading Schubert's work after his death, said Schubert was "the most poetic musician who ever lived." Schubert's symphonies were of particular interest to Antonín Dvořák. Hector Berlioz and Anton Bruckner acknowledged the influence of the Great C Major Symphony. Robert Schumann, after seeing the manuscript of the symphony in Vienna in 1838, brought it to the attention of Mendelssohn. Mendelssohn then conducted the first performance of the symphony, albeit in a heavily abridged version, in Leipzig in 1839.

In the 20th century, composers including Richard Strauss, Anton Webern, Benjamin Britten, George Crumb, and Hans Zender championed or paid homage to Schubert in some of their works. Britten, an accomplished pianist, accompanied many of Schubert's Lieder and performed many piano solo and duet works. The German electronic music group Kraftwerk has a track titled "Franz Schubert" on their 1977 album Trans-Europe Express.

=== Commemorations ===
In 1897, the 100th anniversary of Schubert's birth was marked in the musical world by festivals and performances dedicated to his music. In Vienna, there were ten days of concerts, and Emperor Franz Joseph gave a speech recognising Schubert as the creator of the art song, and one of Austria's favourite sons. Karlsruhe saw the first production of his opera Fierrabras.

In 1928, Schubert Week was held in Europe and the United States to mark the centenary of the composer's death. Works by Schubert were performed in churches, in concert halls, and on radio stations. A competition, with top prize money of US$10,000 and sponsorship by the Columbia Phonograph Company, was held for "original symphonic works presented as an apotheosis of the lyrical genius of Schubert, and dedicated to his memory". The winning entry was Kurt Atterberg's sixth symphony.

=== In film and television ===
Schubert has featured as a character in several films including Schubert's Dream of Spring (1931), Gently My Songs Entreat (1933), Serenade (1940), The Great Awakening (1941)—whose plot is based on a fictional episode of him fleeing Vienna to Hungary to avoid conscription—It's Only Love (1947), Franz Schubert (1953), Das Dreimäderlhaus (1958), and Mit meinen heißen Tränen (1986).

Schubert's life was covered in the documentary Franz Peter Schubert: The Greatest Love and the Greatest Sorrow by Christopher Nupen (1994), and in the documentary Schubert – The Wanderer by András Schiff and Mischa Scorer (1997), both produced for the BBC. "Great Performances," "Now Hear This: The Schubert Generation Series," hosted by Scott Yoo, explored commentary and performances by contemporary musician admirers.

Schubert's music has also been featured in numerous films:

- Walt Disney's Fantasia (1940): Ave Maria (D. 839).
- Michael Powell's The Life and Death of Colonel Blimp (1943): Unfinished Symphony at the concert in the POW camp
- Robert Bresson's film Au hasard Balthazar (1966): Piano Sonata No. 20 in A Major (D. 959).
- Stanley Kubrick's Barry Lyndon (1975): second movement from the Piano Trio No. 2 in E♭ Major, Op. 100/D.929.
- The English version of The Adventures of Milo and Otis (1989): Serenade, D. 957, and "Auf dem Wasser zu singen", D. 774.
- Woody Allen's Crimes and Misdemeanors (1989): String Quartet No. 15 in G.
- The Roman Polanski film Death and the Maiden (1994): uses and takes its name from the music of the String Quartet No. 14 in D minor, Death and the Maiden.
- Christopher Hampton's biographical film Carrington (1995): second movement of the String Quintet in C major (D. 956).
- Michael Haneke's La pianiste (2001), based on the novel by Elfriede Jelinek (1983). The protagonist is an expert on the works of Schubert.
- Guy Ritchie's Sherlock Holmes: A Game of Shadows (2011): Piano Quintet in A major, D. 667 (Trout Quintet).

== See also ==
- List of Austrian musicians
- Franz Schubert City Museum in Želiezovce
