= Nikolaus Dumba =

Austrian businessman

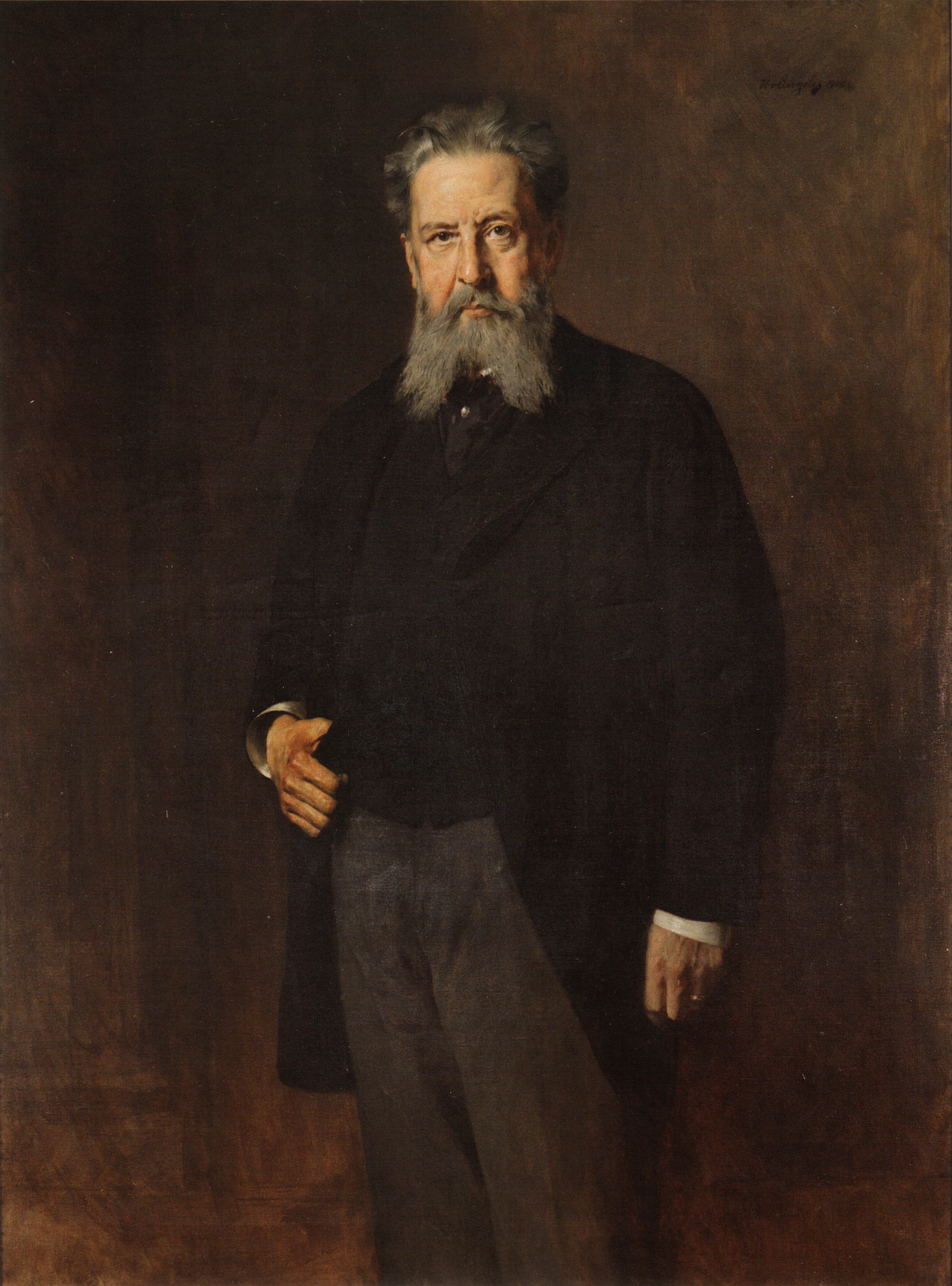
Portrait of Dumba by Heinrich von Angeli

Nikolaus Dumba (Greek: Νικόλαος Δούμπας; Romanian: Nicolae Dumba; 24 July 1830 – 23 March 1900) was an Austrian industrialist and liberal politician. He is considered to have been an important patron of the arts and music and a benefactor of Greece.

== Biography ==
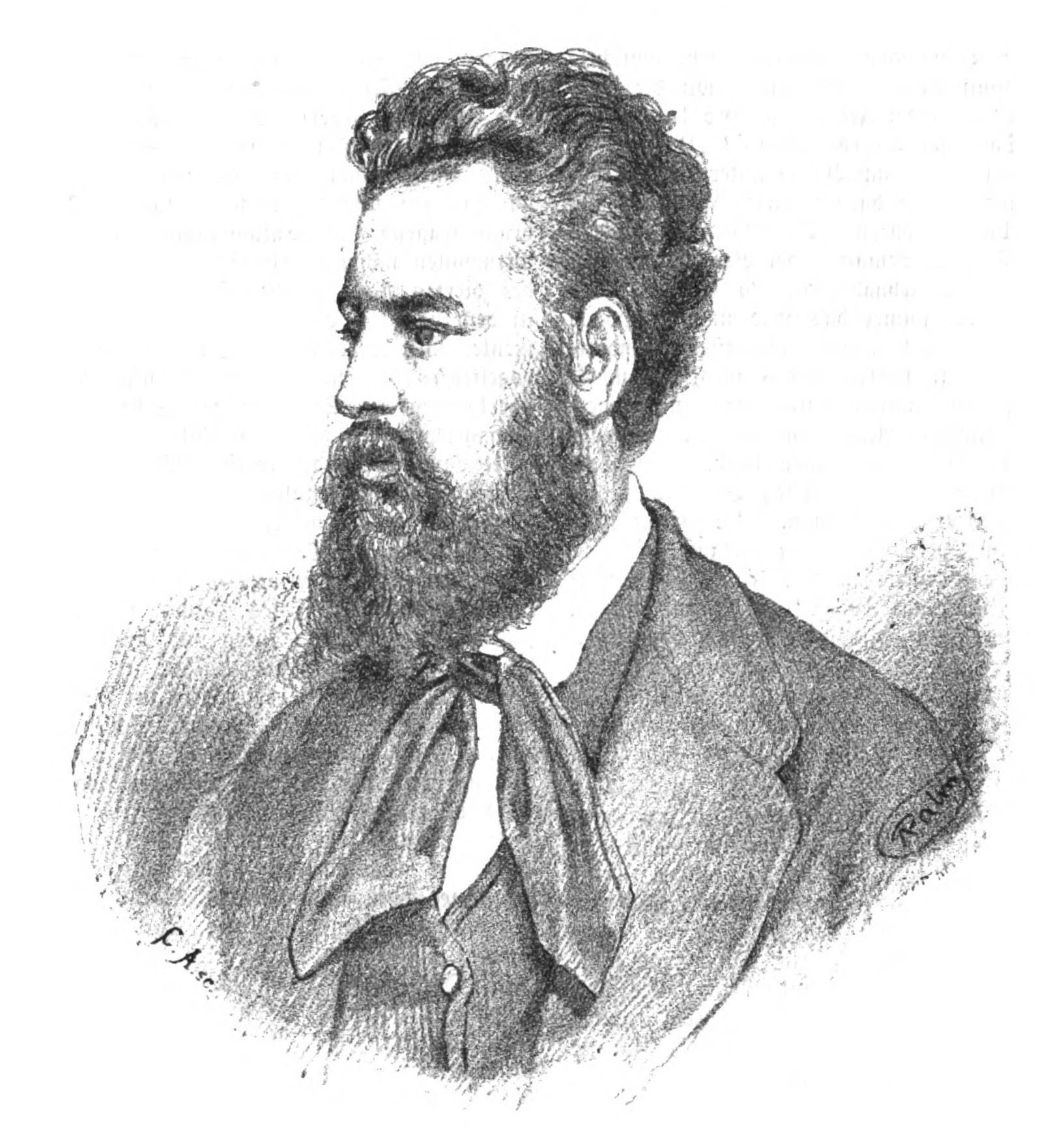
Dumba in 1873

In 1817, Nikolaus' father Stergios, an immigrant to Vienna from a family of Aromanian or Greek descent from Vlasti, a village then part of the Ottoman Empire and today in Greece, became a merchant. Nikolaus Dumba was born on in Vienna on 24 July 1830. He attended the Akademisches Gymnasium and spent the revolutionary years of 1847–1848 with his brother Michael at the residence of the Austrian Ambassador Anton von Prokesch-Osten in Athens. During this time, he studied at the National and Kapodistrian University of Athens. In 1852, he took a trip to Egypt with the travel writer Alexander Ziegler.

He was trained for a commercial career and took over a cotton mill in Tattendorf that had been operated by his cousin Theodore. It had approximately 180 employees and soon became a highly profitable enterprise. This financial base allowed him to turn his interests elsewhere. He was knighted and appointed to the legislature, where he was very active.

Dumba died in Budapest on 23 March 1900.

His nephew, Konstantin Dumba, was Austria-Hungary's last Ambassador to the United States.

== Patron of the arts and benefactor ==
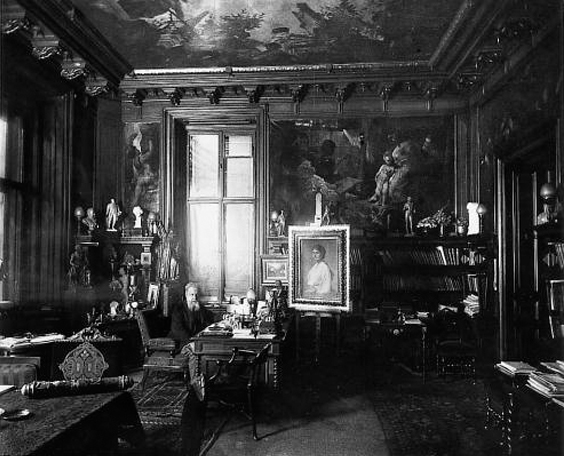
Dumba in his office at the Palais Dumba

=== In Vienna ===
He was a close friend of Hans Makart, Gustav Klimt and Carl Kundmann and was a strong promoter of contemporary art. He helped establish several monuments to famous composers of the past and served as a Vice-President of the Friends of Music Society.

Dumba left 50,000 florins to the Men's Choral Society of Vienna in order to free them from financial concerns. In return, he asked that "from time to time, a choral work in remembrance of me should be performed in a church" and that "the money should never be used for a building". To this day, Franz Schubert's German Mass is often sung in his honor.

Dumba was a major donor for the Musikverein building. The Austrian government named a street (Dumbastraße) near the Musikverein after him.

In his will, he bequeathed over 200 original manuscripts by Schubert to the City of Vienna. These formed the basis for what is now the world's largest collection of musical scores at the Vienna City Hall Library.

He also funded the România Jună (Young Romania) Student Organisation in Vienna, as well as various cultural organisations in the newly-established Kingdom of Romania. In recognition of these achievements, he was awarded the Order of the Crown of Romania. In an 1897 interview with Aromanian schoolteacher Ion Arginteanu for Gazeta Macedoniei, Nikolaus Dumba stated: "I am a Kutzo-Vlach [Aromanian] and I am proud of this name."

=== In Greece ===
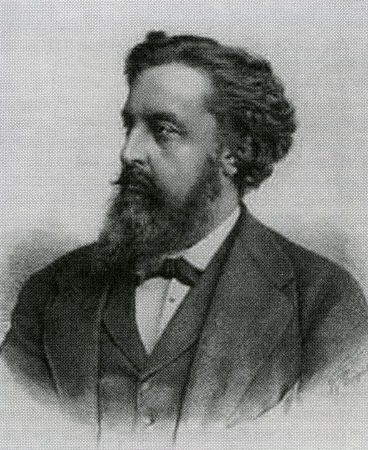
Dumba in 1900

During a visit to Athens with his wife Anna, he made a grant to the University of Athens to finish the building interiors. In the city of Serres, near his father's hometown, he founded an orphanage and contributed to the construction of a vocational school, under the aegis of his friend and fellow Greek politician, Georgios Averoff.

== Political functions ==
From 1870 to 1896, Dumba was a member of the Landtag, where he served on the Finance Committee and the Poor Law Committee, occasionally acting as the Landtag chairman's deputy. In 1885, the Kaiser appointed him to the Herrenhaus, the Upper Chamber of the Imperial Council of Austria.

== Selected honors ==
Dumba obtained following medals:

Austrian Empire and Austria-Hungary

- Order of the Iron Crown, Second Class
- Knight's Cross of the Order of Franz Joseph

Romania

- Commander's Cross, First Class, of the Romanian Order of the Crown

On 28 March, 1900, the "Künstlergasse" (Artist Lane) was renamed "Dumbastraße" (Dumba Street), by vote of the Vienna City Council.
