= Carl Kundmann =

Austrian sculptor

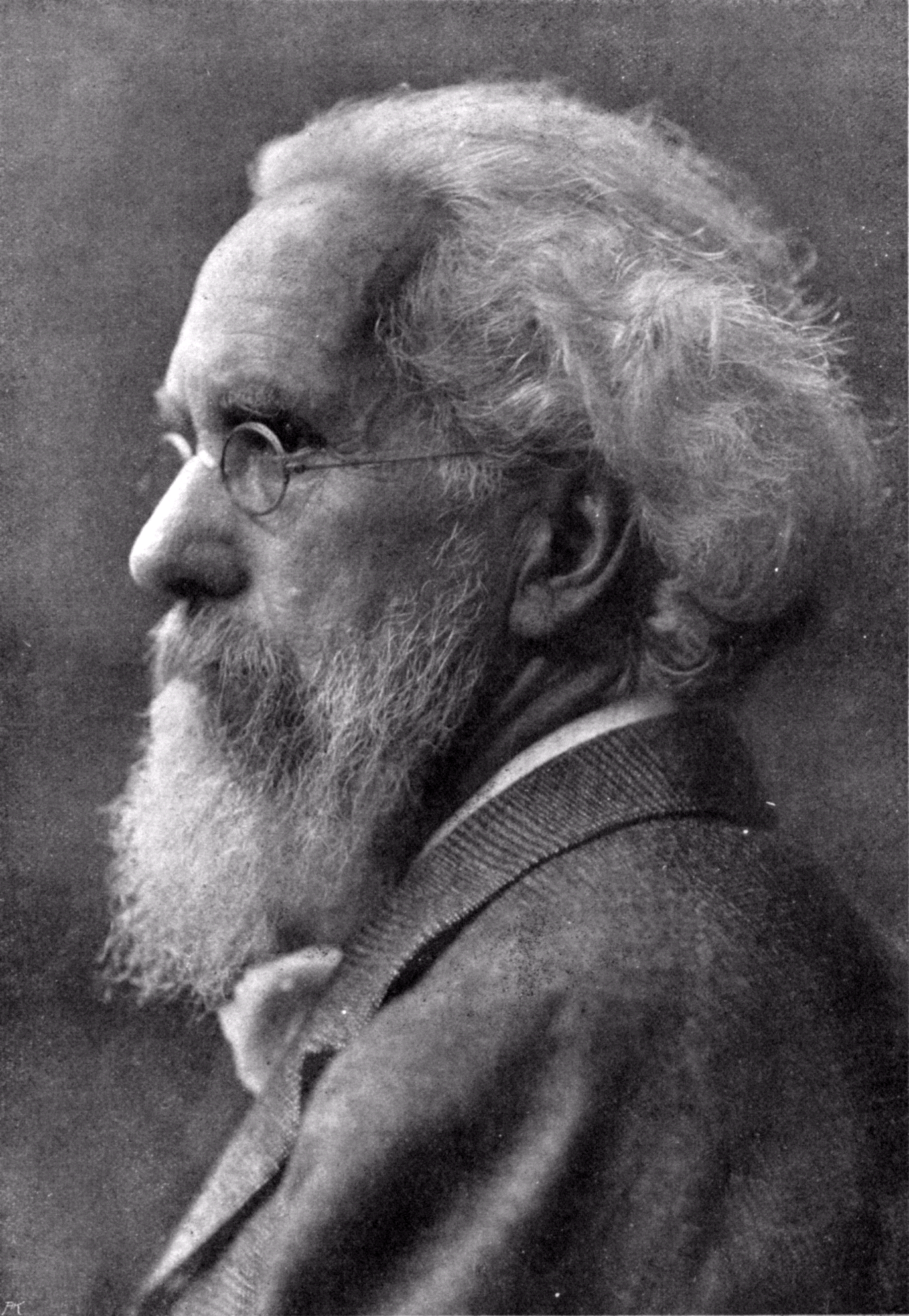
Carl Kundmann in 1909. Photograph by Carl Pietzner (1853–1927)

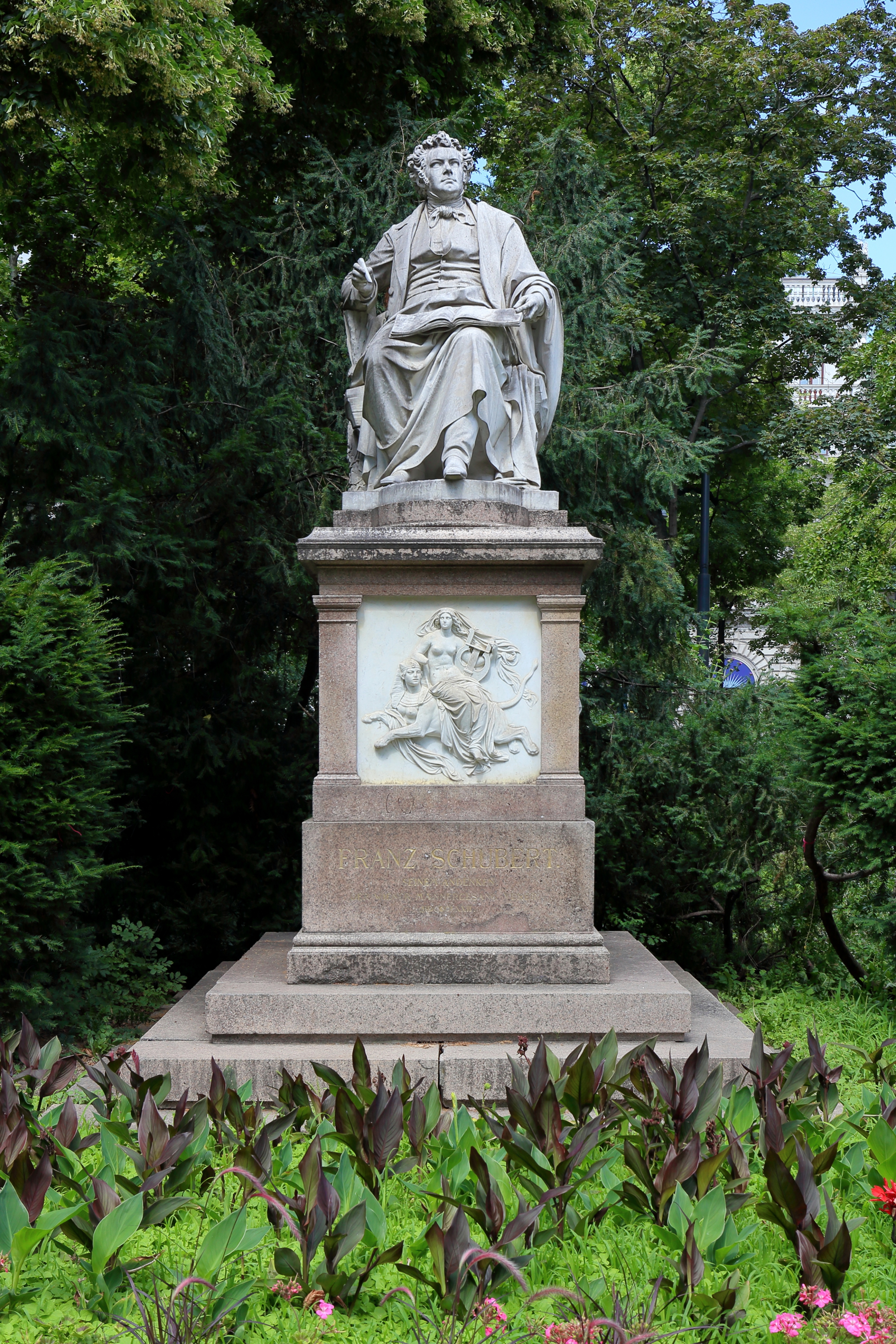
Schubert Monument

Carl Kundmann (15 June 1838, Vienna – 9 June 1919, Vienna) was an Austrian sculptor, best known for his works which adorn the area around the Ringstraße project.

== Life and work ==
Kundmann studied at the Academy of Fine Arts Vienna. After six years, he went to Dresden to study with Ernst Julius Hähnel, who had a major influence on his style. From 1865 to 1867 he lived in Rome, where he worked on designs for a Schubert Monument to be placed in the Stadtpark which had been commissioned by the Vienna Men's Choral Society and financed by Nikolaus Dumba, an industrialist patron of the arts. Where to place the statue was the subject of much debate. Mayor Andreas Zelinka wanted it to be placed in a prominent position but, in 1868, the Artistic Advisory Board prevailed, selecting a more "intimate" location between trees on the edge of the lawn. The foundation was laid that same year and the monument (with three reliefs by Theophil Hansen) was unveiled in 1872. The work was such a success that it earned Kundmann a professorship at the Academy, where he taught until his retirement in 1909. Christian Behrens is probably his best known student.

In 1872, Kundmann entered a competition to create parts of a memorial to the Archduchess Maria Theresa, to be placed between the Naturhistorisches Museum and the Kunsthistorisches Museum, under the direction of Kaspar von Zumbusch. Kundmann received commissions for several statues at both museums. He also worked on memorials to Franz Grillparzer and Wilhelm von Tegetthoff, as well as sculptures for the City hall, the new wing of the Hofburg Palace and the arcades of the University of Vienna. His studio was located at Wiener Gürtel Straße Nr. 3.

A few weeks after his death, a street in Landstraße was renamed the Kundmanngasse in his honor.

== Major works ==
- 1867–1873: Statues of Rudolf I of Germany, Leopold I, Margrave of Austria, Prince Eugene of Savoy and Charles Bonaventure de Longueval in the Feldherrenhalle of the Heeresgeschichtlichen Museum in the Arsenal.
- 1877: Competition for the Grillparzer Monument in the Volksgarten: Kundmann was commissioned to do the main figure and Rudolf Weyr did the relief panels. The monument was unveiled in 1889.
- 1886 Tegetthoff Monument in the Praterstern (a square in the Leopoldstadt district).
- 1898 – 1902 Athena Fountain in front of the Austrian Parliament Building.
