= Stadtpark, Vienna =

Park in Vienna

Coordinates: 48°12′17″N 16°22′50″E

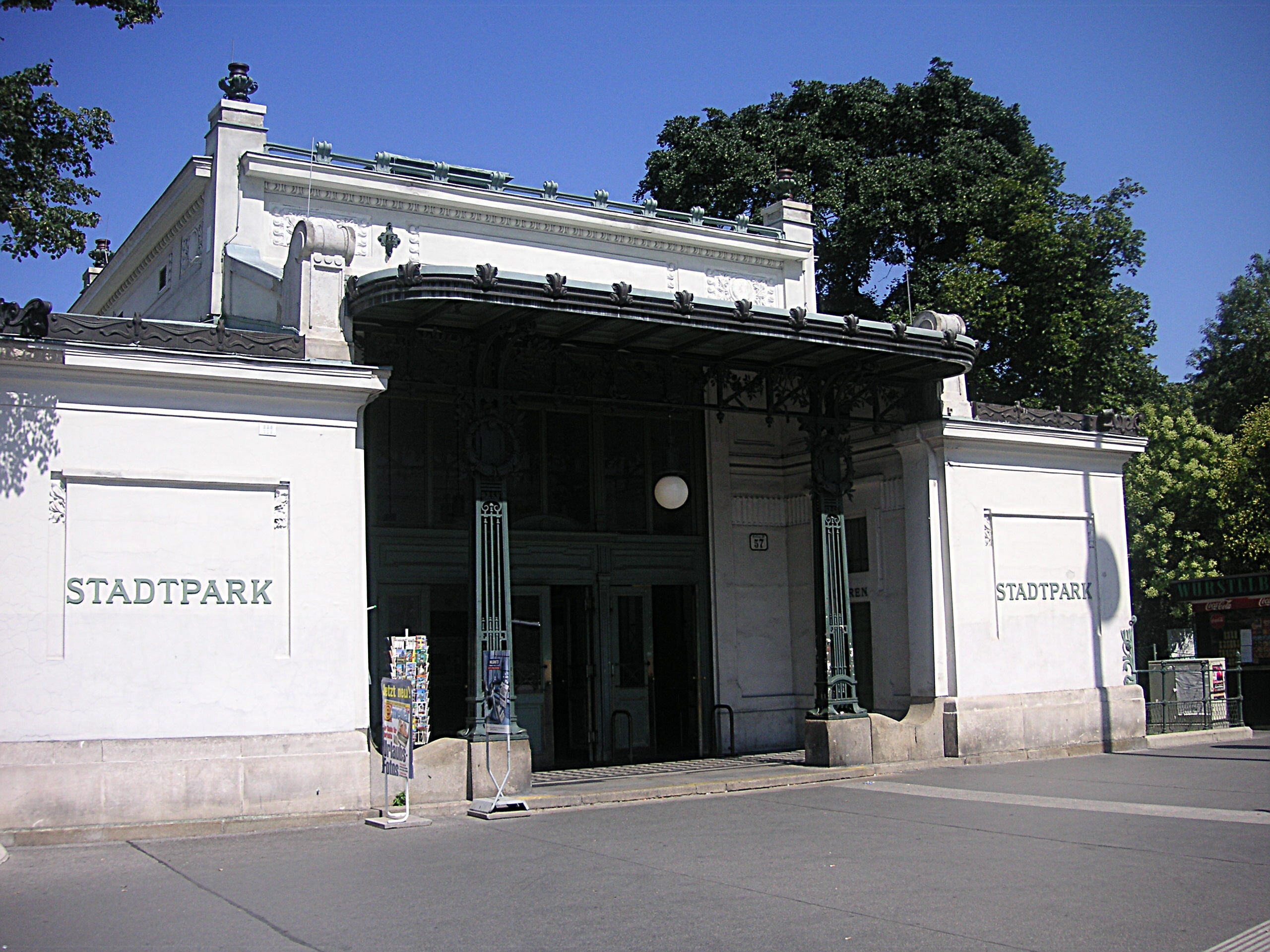
The U-Bahn station Stadtpark, designed by Otto Wagner

The Stadtpark (German: [ˈʃtatˌpaʁk], City Park) in Vienna, Austria is a large municipal park that extends from the Ringstraße in the Innere Stadt first district up to the Heumarkt (Hay Market) in the Landstraße third district. The park is divided in two sections by the Wienfluss (Vienna River), and has a total surface area of 65,000 square metres (28 acres). Scattered throughout the park are statues of famous Viennese artists, writers, and composers, including Hans Canon, Emil Jakob Schindler, Johann Strauss II, Franz Schubert, and Anton Bruckner. The opulent Kursalon building on Johannesgasse, with its broad terrace that reaches into the park, is the site of popular waltz concerts.

== History ==
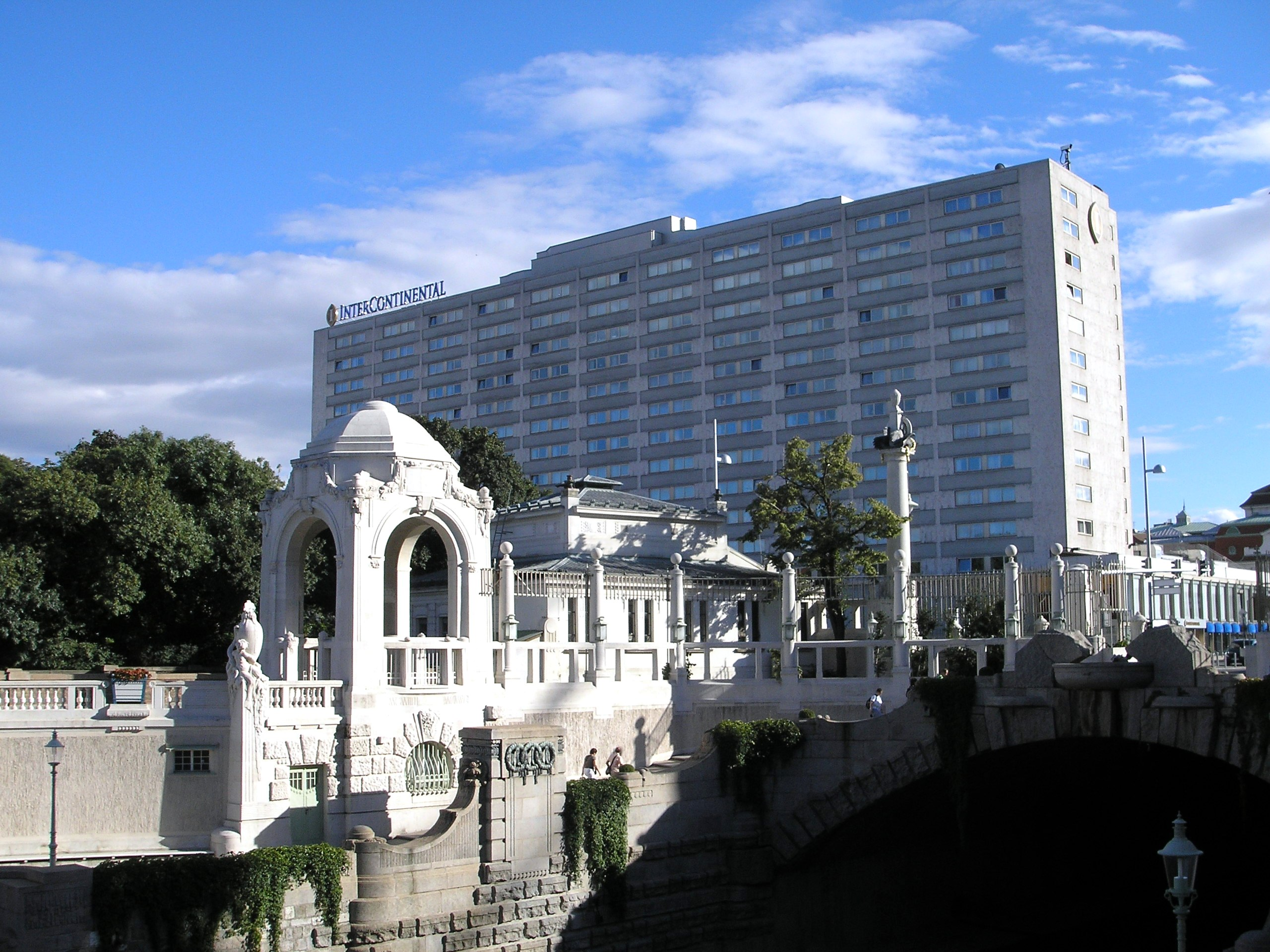
Wienfluss in the Stadtpark

Even as early as in the Biedermeier period, the glacis before the Karolinenstadttor (Caroline City Gate) was a popular site of entertainment. During the demolition of the city walls and the creation of the Vienna Ringstraße in its place, the mayor at that time, Andreas Zelinka, promoted the project of creating a public park on the territory. The park was designed in the style of English gardens by the landscape painter Josef Selleny, while the plans were made by the city gardener Rudolf Siebeck. On 21 August 1862 the park was opened, becoming the first public park in Vienna.

On the southern shore of the Wienfluß, the so-called Kinderpark (Children's park) was created in 1863, which is today still used mainly as a playground and for sports. The Karolinenbrücke (Caroline Bridge), which was built in 1857 (since 1918 it is known as Stadtparkbrücke - City Park Bridge) connects it to the Stadtpark proper on the northern side of the river.

After the regulation of the Wienfluss, the whole river area was rebuilt by Friedrich Ohmann and Josef Hackhofer between 1903 and 1907, with a gate out of which the river flows, pavilions and stairs to its shorts. The architecture, together with the U-Bahn station by Otto Wagner, is among the sights of the park.

== Sights in the park ==
=== The Kursalon ===
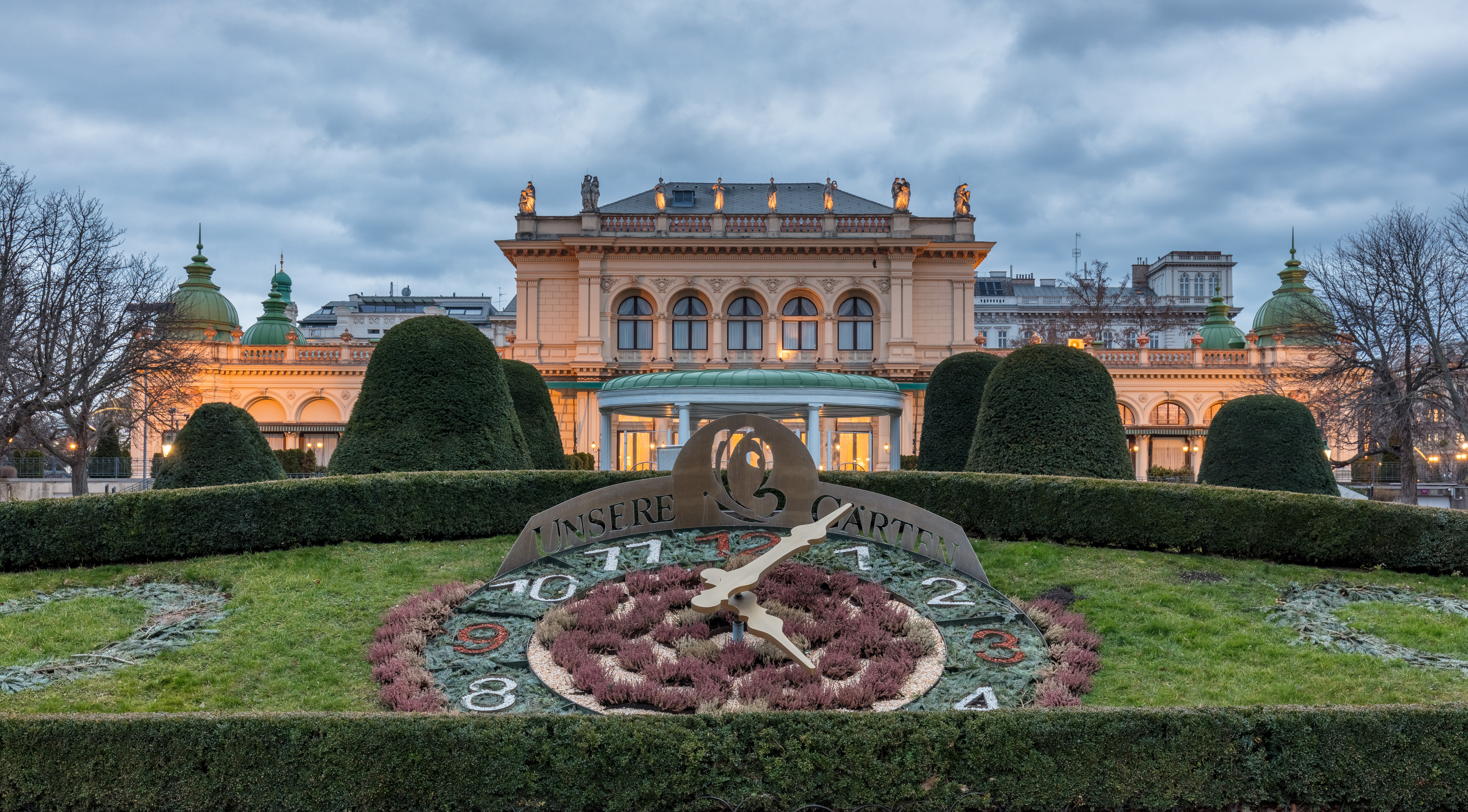
Floral clock and the Kursalon in the back.

At the water glacis, a spa pavilion was built, in which mineral water with healing properties was served. The current Kursalon building was built between 1865 and 1867 according to plans of Johann Garben. The opulent building in the historicist style of the Italian renaissance is located next to the Johannesgasse. A wide terrace reaching into the park is attached to it.

After it was opened on 8 May 1867 amusements were originally prohibited. However, since that concept was not accepted, it was changed, and Johann Strauss II gave his first concert here on 15 October 1868. The Kursalon thus became a popular place for concerts and for dancing, especially during the era of the Strauss brothers. Today, after undergoing some renovation, it is still used for balls, concerts, nightclub events and congresses. There is also a Café-Restaurant inside it.

=== Monuments ===
The gilded bronze monument of Johann Strauß II, is one of the most known and most frequently photographed monuments in Vienna. It was unveiled to the public on 26 June 1921 and is framed by a marble relief made by Edmund Hellmer. The gilding was removed in 1935 and laid on again only in 1991.

There are several other monuments, e.g. of Franz Schubert, Franz Lehár, Robert Stolz and Hans Makart; the Stadtpark is the park with the largest number of monuments and sculptures in Vienna.

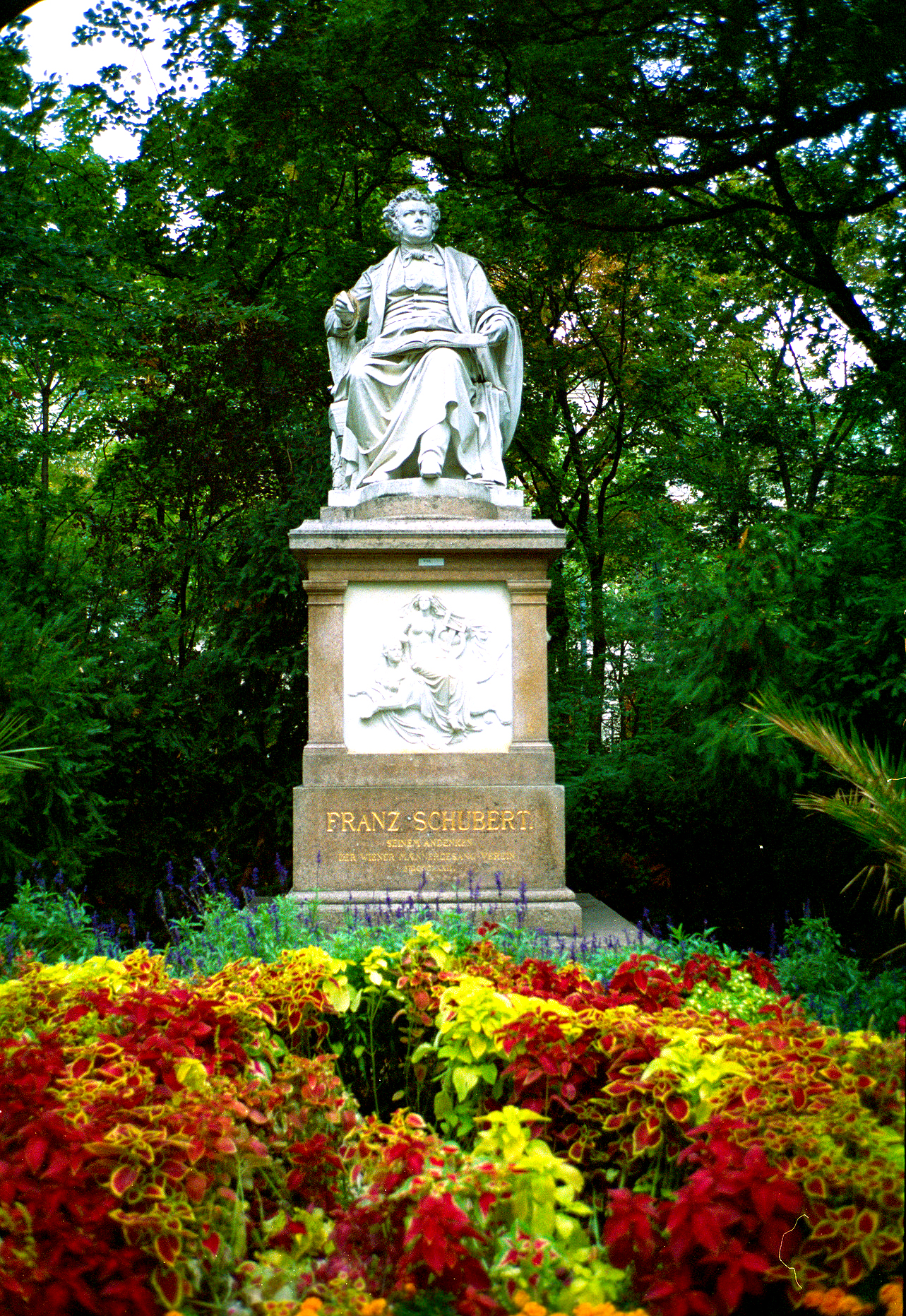
Franz Schubert Monument

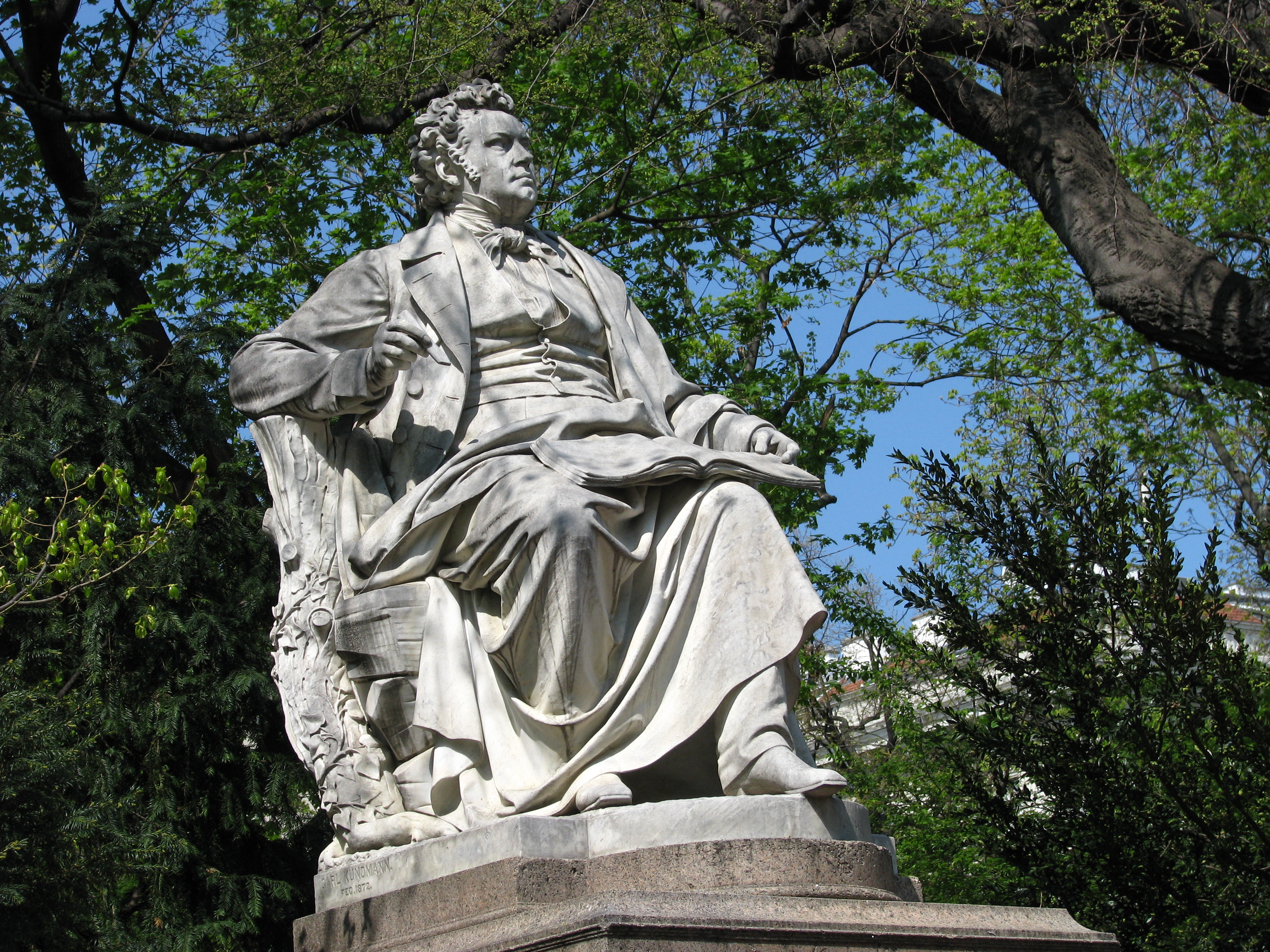
Closeup of Franz Schubert statue

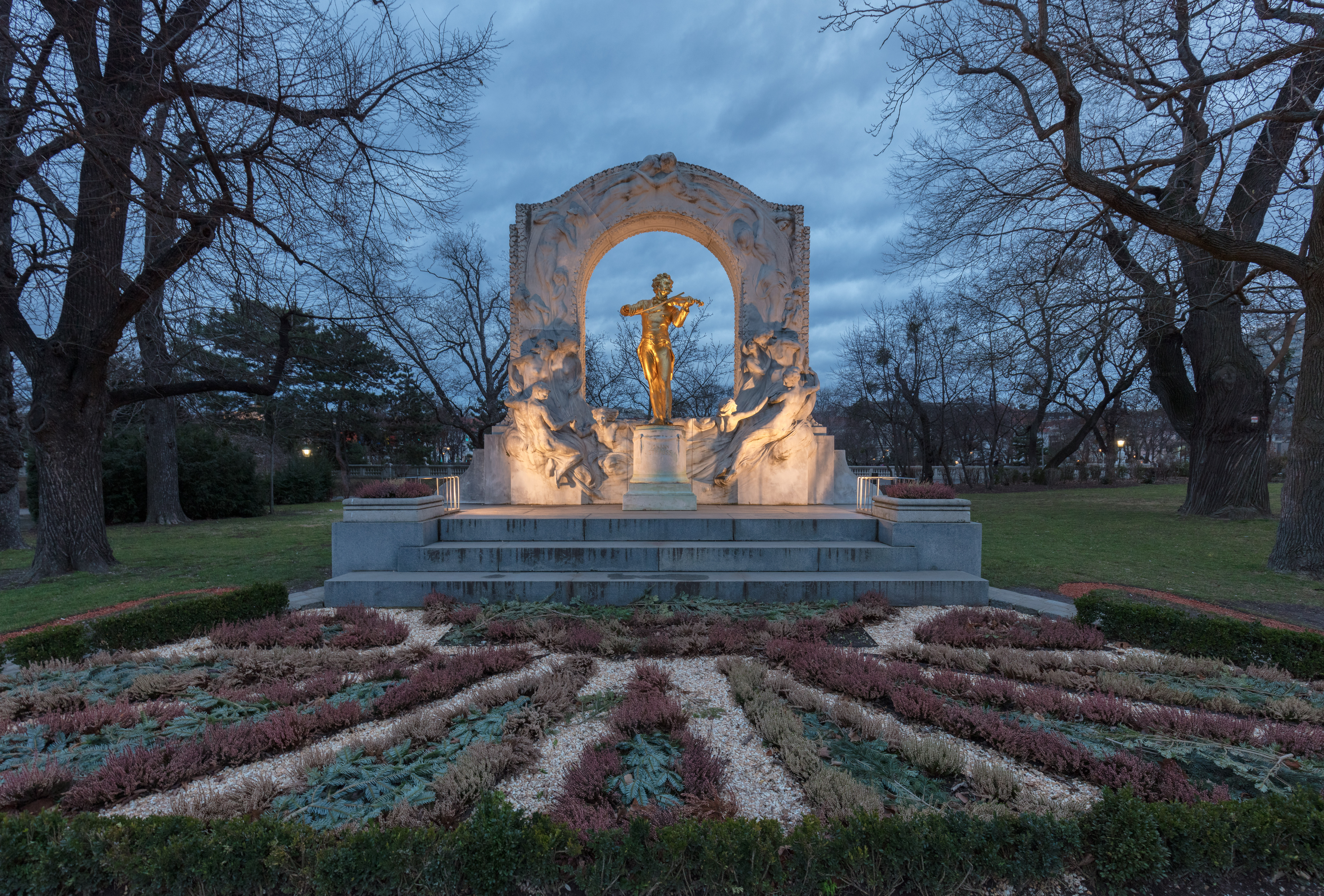
Johann Strauss Monument

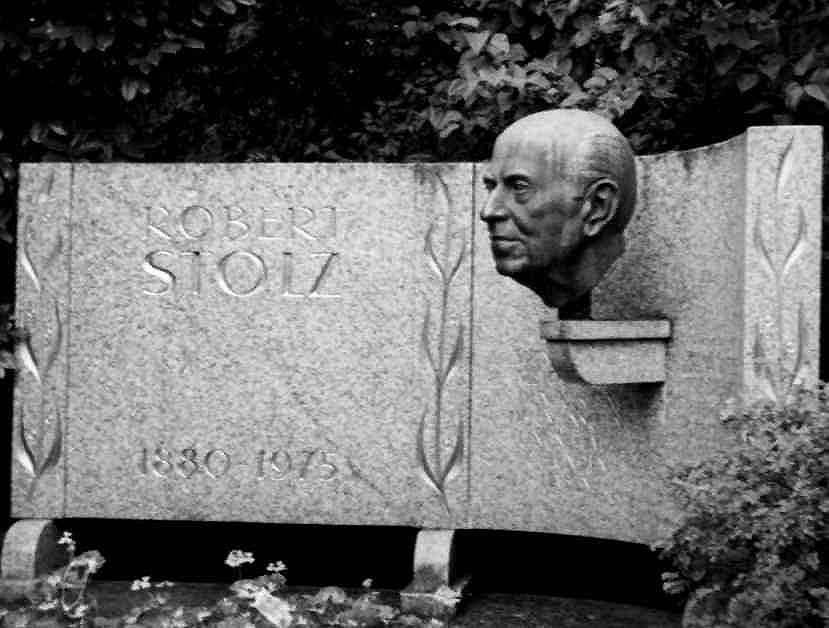
Robert Stolz bust

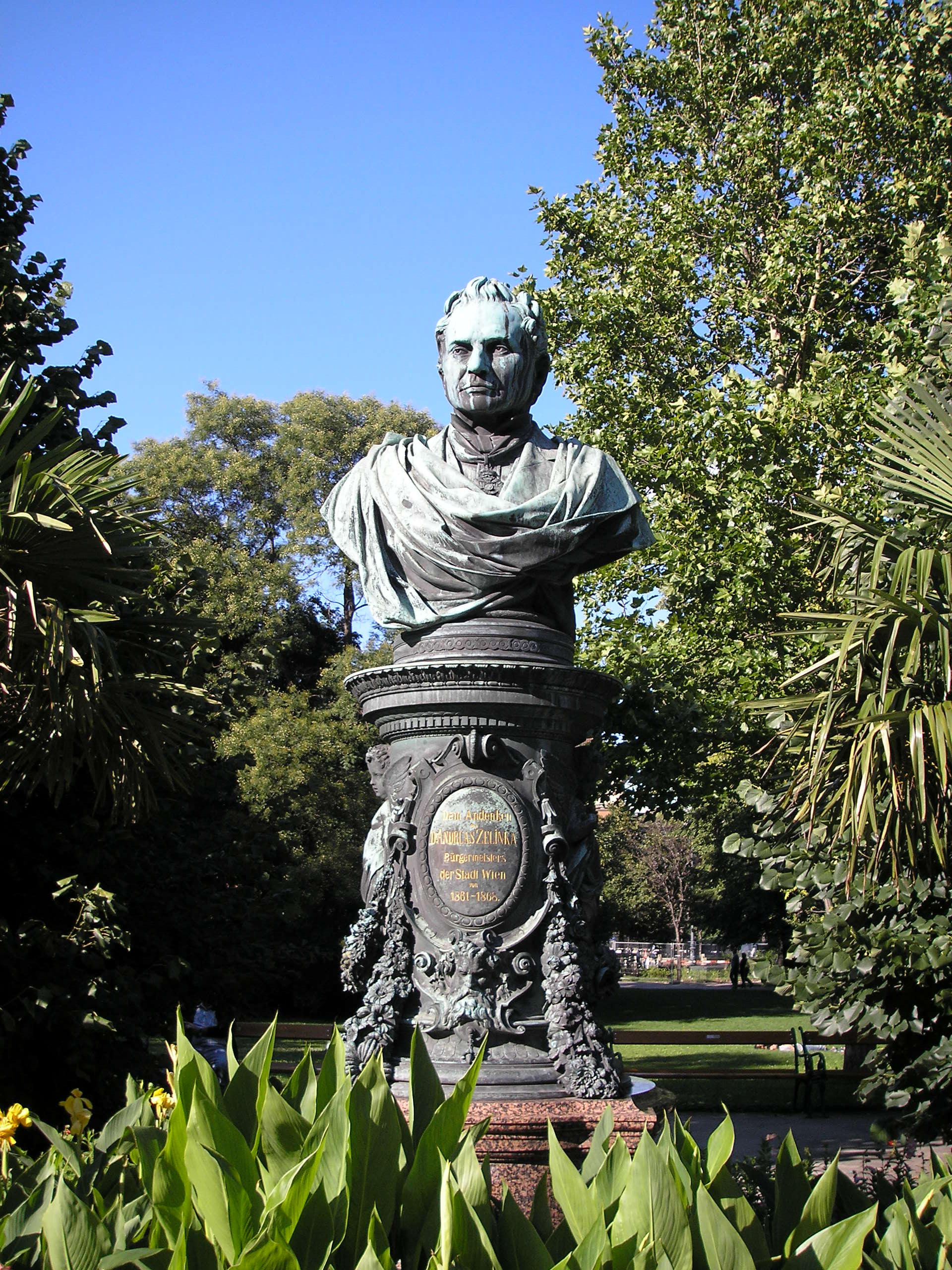
Andreas Zelinka Monument

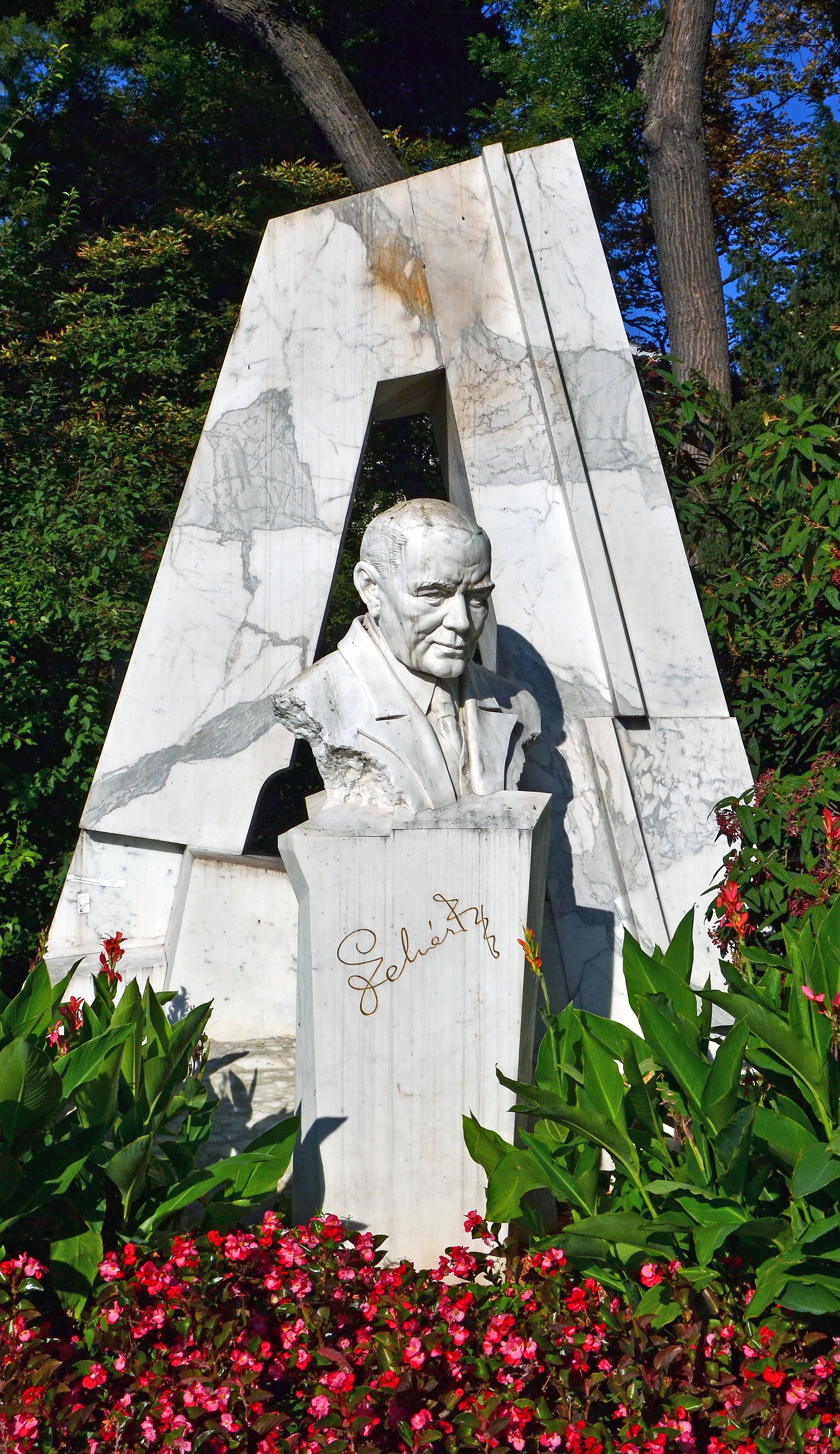
Franz Lehár Monument

=== The Meierei ===
The former milk drinking hall was erected as part of the installations surrounding the Wienfluß according to plans of Friedrich Ohmann and Josef Hackhofer during the years of 1901 to 1903. After suffering heavy damage during World War II, the building was extended during reconstruction. Today, with another annex having been built, there is a restaurant in the Meierei.

=== Plants ===
The flora in the park is characterized by a wide range of species, planted to bloom in all seasons. A parkway bordering the Ringstraße reduces the impact of noise and emission on the park. Some groves are natural protection zones, including ginkgo, honey locust, Pyramid Poplar, and Caucasian wingnut.
