= Marie Pachler =

Austrian pianist

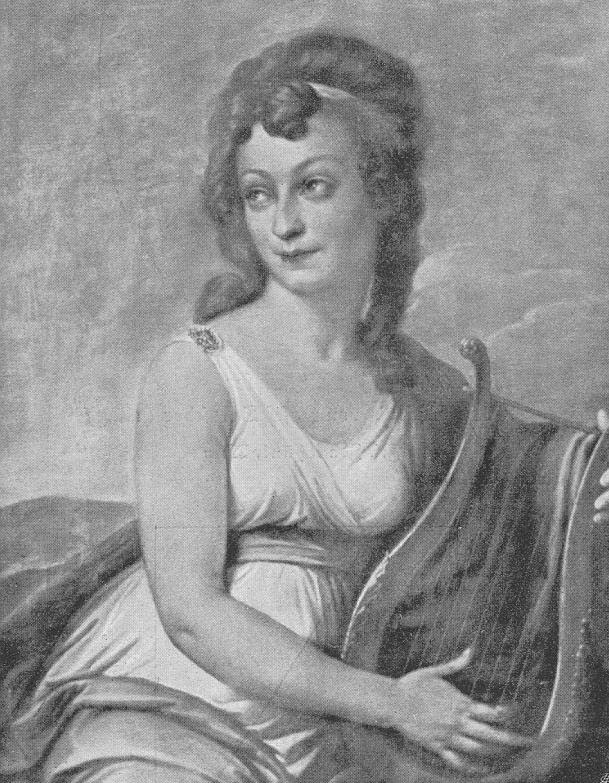
Marie Pachler

Marie Pachler (2 October 1794 – 10 April 1855) was an Austrian pianist and composer. She was an admirer of Ludwig van Beethoven, and a friend of Franz Schubert.

== Biography ==
Marie Pachler was born as Marie Leopold Koschak on 2 October 1794 in Graz, Austria. Her father, Aldebrand Koschak, was a Slovenian lawyer. Her mother, Therese, came from a business family in Vienna. Her parents encouraged her musical talents, and supported her musical and general education. She took music lessons from Heimrich Gugel and Julius Franz Borgias Schneller. During her childhood she performed at concerts organized by her father, and she also presented her first compositions at the age of nine. In the beginning of her musical career, she faced financial problems.

On 12 May 1816 she married Karl Pachler, who was also a barrister in Graz. In 1817 she met Ludwig van Beethoven, German composer and pianist, who appreciated her musical talent.

She also performed with the Austrian composer Franz Schubert in a 1827 charity concert organized by the Graz Music Association. Schubert dedicated his song, "An Sylvia," to Marie Pachler.

She died in Graz on 10 April 1855.
