= List of compositions by Franz Schubert (1825) =

Franz Schubert's compositions of 1825 are mostly in the Deutsch catalogue (D) range D 823–862, and include:

- Instrumental works:
  - Piano Sonata in C major, D 840
  - Piano Sonata in A minor, D 845
  - Piano Sonata in D major, D 850
- Vocal music:
  - "Ave Maria", D 839, and six other songs from Walter Scott's Lady of the Lake, Op. 52

== Table ==
=== Legend ===
Legend to the table
column		content
1	D '51	Deutsch number in the first version of the Deutsch catalogue (1951)
2	D utd	most recent (utd = up to date) Deutsch catalogue number; the basic collation of the list is according to these numbers – whether or not the possibility to adjust the sorting according to the content of other columns is available depends on the device with which the table is displayed.
3	Op. pbl	Opus number (Op.; p indicates Post. = posthumous) and date of first publication (pbl; between brackets; when there is more than one date the earlier dates indicate partial publications). The column sorts to Opus number, then (earliest of) the publication date(s)
4	AGA	Alte Gesamt-Ausgabe = Franz Schubert's Werke: Kritisch durchgesehene Gesammtausgabe. Indicates genre/instrumentation: Series I: Symphonien (Nos. 1-8) (Johannes Brahms, 1884); Series II: Overtüren und Andere Orchesterwerke (Johann Nepomuk Fuchs, 1886); Series III: Oktette (Nos. 1-3) and IV: Streichquintett (Eusebius Mandyczewski, 1889); Series V: Streichquartette (Nos. 1-15) (Joseph Hellmesberger and Eusebius Mandyczewski, 1890); Series VI: Trio für Streichinstrumente (Eusebius Mandyczewski, 1892); Series VII: Trios, Quartets and Quintets with Piano and VIII: Pianoforte und Ein Instrument (Ignaz Brüll, 1886); Series IX: Pianoforte zu vier Händen (Anton Door, 1888); Series X: Sonaten für Pianoforte (Julius Epstein, 1888); Series XI: Fantasie, Impromptus und andere Stücke für Pianoforte (Julius Epstein, 1888); Series XII: Tänze für Pianoforte (Nos. 1-31) (Julius Epstein, 1889); Series XIII: Messen (Nos. 1-7) (Eusebius Mandyczewski, 1887); Series XIV: Kleinere Kirchenmusikwerke (Nos. 1-22) (Eusebius Mandyczewski, 1888); Series XV: Dramatische Musik (Johann Nepomuk Fuchs, 1893); Series XVI: Werke für Männerchor (Nos. 1-46) (Eusebius Mandyczewski, 1891); Series XVII: Werke für gemischten Chor (Nos. 1-19) (Josef Gänsbacher, Eusebius Mandyczewski, 1892); Series XVIII: Werke für Drei und mehr Frauenstimmen mit Pianoforte-Begleitung (Nos. 1-6) (Josef Gänsbacher, Eusebius Mandyczewski, 1891); Series XIX: Kleine Gesangswerke (Nos. 1-36) (Josef Gänsbacher and Eusebius Mandyczewski, 1892); Series XX: Sämtliche einstimmige Lieder und Gesänge (Eusebius Mandyczewski, 1894-1895); Series XXI: Supplement (Eusebius Mandyczewski, 1897); 1. Instrumentalmusik No. 1-5; 2. Instrumentalmusik No. 6-13; 3. Instrumentalmusik No. 14-; 4. Gesangsmusik; Series XXII: Revisionsbericht
5	NSA	NGA/NSA/NSE = New Schubert Edition, also indicates genre/instrumentation: Series I: Church Music; Series II: Stage Works; Series III: Part Songs; Series IV: Lieder; Series V: Orchestral Works; Series VI: Chamber Music; 1. Octet and Nonet; 2. String Quintet; 3. String Quartets I; 4. String Quartets II; 5. String Quartets III; 6. String Trios; 7. Works for Piano and several instruments; 8. Works for Piano and one instrument; 9. Dances for several instruments; Series VII: Piano Music; 1. Works for Piano Four Hands; 2. Works for Piano Two Hands; Series VIII: Supplement, 2. Schubert's Studies
6	Name	unique name, with, if available, a link to the relevant encyclopedia article; sorts by name with initial definite ("Der", "Die", "Das", ...) or indefinite ("Ein", "A", ...) articles, and numbers, moved after the expression they qualify: e.g. "Die Hoffnung, ..." sorts as "Hoffnung, Die, ..." – "Thirty Minuets ..." sorts as "Minuets, 30, ...".
7	Key / incipit	incipit mostly for songs (linking to lyrics and their translation, for instance at The LiederNet Archive, when available), other compositions by key, except for Schubert's stage works: type of composition in brackets.
8	Date	(presumed) date of composition, or, for copies and arrangements, date of Schubert's autograph. Sorts to earliest possible date of completion, unlike the chronology of the Deutsch catalogue that generally collates according to earliest date associated with the composition: e.g. Schubert started the composition of his 3rd String Quartet on 19 November 1812 and completed it on 21 February 1813 – in the Deutsch catalogue the composition is grouped with other compositions from 1812: when using the sort function of the 8th column the composition is grouped with compositions completed in 1813
9	Additional info	may include: Information about the text (lyrics, libretto) of vocal compositions: e.g., "Text by [text author]", "Text: [standard lyrics]", "... from [literary work]"; "other settings: D ..." indicates Schubert's other settings of the same text; for fields starting with "Text ..." this column sorts by text author (last name, first name—or pen name when such name is more established), then incipit of the lyrics (alternatively, when the incipit is rarely used, title of the work); Information about the authenticity of the composition: the work is without doubt Schubert's unless when marked as "Doubtful", "Spurious?" or "Spurious" (in the last case columns 3–8 give no further information about the composition); Forces needed for performance ("For ..."): may be omitted when the type of composition makes the instrumentation clear (e.g. String Quartet → two violins, viola and cello), and, for vocal music, when the setting is for voice and piano; "s", "a", "t" and "b" refer to a single soprano, alto, tenor and bass singer respectively, while "S", "A", "T" and "B" to choral parts for the same types of singers (see SATB).; Specifications regarding movements (e.g. "Allegro – Minuet – Rondo") or sections (e.g. "No. 1 ..."); Information about the completeness of the extant work: the work is considered complete as extant unless when marked "Sketch", "Incomplete", "Unfinished", "Fragment" or "Lost"; Information about versions (e.g. "Two versions: ...")

=== List ===
Compositions by Franz Schubert listed in the Deutsch catalogue for 1825
D '51	D utd	Op. pbl	AGA	NSA	Name	Key / incipit	Date	Additional info
823	823	63 & 84 (1826) (1827)	IX, 3 Nos. 20–22	VII/1, 2 No. 4	Divertissement sur des motifs originaux français	E minor	before 17/6/1826– before 6/7/1827	For piano duet; Tempo di Marcia (publ. as Divertissement en Forme d'une Marche brillante et raisonnée Op. 63 in 1826) – Theme and variations (publ. as Andantino varié Op. 84 No. 1 in 1827) – Rondo (publ. as Rondeau brillant Op. 84 No. 2 in 1827)
824	824	61 (1826)	IX, 3 No. 25	VII/1, 4	Six Polonaises	Various keys	April 1826	For piano duet
825; No. 1	825	64,1 (1828)	XVI; No. 24	III, 4 No. 52	Wehmut, D 825	Die Abendglocke tönet	before summer 1826	Text by Hüttenbrenner, H.; For ttbb
825; No. 2	825A	64,2 (1828)	XVI; No. 25	III, 4 No. 53	Ewige Liebe	Ertönet, ihr Saiten, in nächtlicher Ruh	before summer 1826	Text by Schulze; For ttbb
825; No. 3	825B	64,3 (1828)	XVI; No. 26	III, 4 No. 54	Flucht	In der Freie will ich leben	early 1825	Text by Lappe; For ttbb
826	826	(1892)	XVII; No. 14	III, 2a No. 17	Der Tanz	Es redet und träumet die Jugend so viel	early 1828	Text by Schnitzer von Meerau?; For satb and piano
827	827	43,2 (1825) (1975)	XX, 8 No. 470	IV, 2a & b No. 10	Nacht und Träume	Heil'ge Nacht, du sinkest nieder!	before June 1823	Text by Collin, M. C.; Two versions: 2nd, in AGA, is Op. 43 No. 2
828	828	43,1 (1825)	XX, 8 No. 469	IV, 2a	Die junge Nonne	Wie braust durch die Wipfel	early 1825	Text by Craigher de Jachelutta
829	829	(1873)	XX, 10; No. 603	IV, 13	Abschied, D 829, a.k.a. Abschied von der Erde	Leb' wohl du schöne Erde	before 17/2/1826	Text by Pratobevera; Melodrama for spoken voice and piano
830	830	85,1 (1828)	XX, 9 No. 541	IV, 4	Lied der Anne Lyle	Wärst du bei mir im Lebenstal	early 1825?	Text by Macdonald quoted in Scott's Montrose (transl.)
831	831	85,2 (1828)	XX, 9 No. 542	IV, 4	Gesang der Norna	Mich führt mein Weg wohl meilenlang	early 1825	Text by Scott from The Pirate transl. by Spiker
832	832	(1830)	XX, 8 No. 466	IV, 13	Des Sängers Habe	Schlagt mein ganzes Glück in Splitter	February; 1825	Text by Schlechta
833	833	101p,2 (1827) (1895)	XX, 8 No. 468	IV, 5	Der blinde Knabe	O sagt, ihr Lieben, mir einmal	April 1825	Text by Cibber transl. by Craigher de Jachelutta; Two versions: 2nd publ. as Op. posth. 101 No. 2 in 1828
834	834	93,1 (1828) (1835)	XX, 8 No. 476	IV, 5	Im Walde, D 834	Ich wandre über Berg und Tal	March 1825 –Sep. 1827	Text by Schulze; Two versions: 2nd, publ. 1828, in AGA
835	835	52,3 (1826)	XVI; No. 10	III, 3 No. 33; IV, 3	Bootgesang a.k.a. Boat Song	Triumph, er naht (Hail to the chief)	1825	Text by Scott from The Lady of the Lake transl. by Storck (Canto II, 19); For ttbb and piano
836	836	52,4 (1826)	XVIII; No. 1	III, 3 No. 9 IV, 3	Coronach: Totengesang der Frauen und Mädchen	Er ist uns geschieden (He is gone to the mountain)	1825	Text by Scott from The Lady of the Lake transl. by Storck (Canto III, 16); For SSA and piano
837	837	52,1 (1826)	XX, 8 No. 471	IV, 3	Ellens Gesang I a.k.a. Ellen's Song (I)	Raste, Krieger, Krieg ist aus (Soldier rest! thy warfare o'er)	April– July 1825	Text by Scott from The Lady of the Lake transl. by Storck (Canto I, 31)
838	838	52,2 (1826)	XX, 8 No. 472	IV, 3	Ellens Gesang II a.k.a. Ellen's Song (II)	Jäger, ruhe von der Jagd! (Huntsman rest! thy chase is done)	April– July 1825	Text by Scott from The Lady of the Lake transl. by Storck (Canto I, 32)
839	839	52,6 (1826)	XX, 8 No. 474	IV, 3	Ave Maria a.k.a. Ellens Gesang III: Hymne an die Jungfrau	Ave Maria! Jungfrau mild (Ave Maria! maiden mild)	April 1825	Text by Scott from The Lady of the Lake transl. by Storck (Canto III, 29)
840	840	(1839) (1861)	XXI, 3 No. 14	VII/2, 2 No. 13	Piano Sonata, D 840 ("Reliquie")	C major	April 1825	Moderato – Andante (publ. 1839) – Minuet (fragment) – Rondo (fragment)
841	841	(1930)		VII/2, 6	Two German Dances, D 841	Various keys	April 1825	For piano
842	842	(1833)	XX, 8 No. 467	IV, 13	Totengräbers Heimwehe	O Menschheit, o Leben, was soll's?	April 1825	Text by Craigher de Jachelutta
843	843	52,7 (1826)	XX, 8 No. 475	IV, 3	Lied des gefangenen Jägers – Lay of the Imprisoned Huntsman	Mein Roß so müd – My hawk is tired	April 1825	Text by Scott from The Lady of the Lake transl. by Storck (Canto VI, 24)
844	844	(1897)	XXI, 3 No. 31	VII/2, 6	Waltz, D 844, a.k.a. Albumblatt	G major	16/4/1825	For piano
845	845	42 (1826)	X No. 9	VII/2, 2 No. 14	Piano Sonata, D 845	A minor	before end May 1825	Moderato – Andante – Scherzo – Rondo
846	846	52,5 (1826)	XX, 8 No. 473	IV, 3	Normans Gesang	Die Nacht bricht bald herein	April 1825	Text by Scott from The Lady of the Lake transl. by Storck (Canto II, 23)
847	847	155p (1849)	XVI; No. 29	III, 4 No. 55	Trinklied aus dem 16. Jahrhundert	Edit Nonna, edit Clerus	July 1825	Text by Gräffer; For ttbb
848	848	156p (1849)	XVI; No. 30	III, 4 No. 56	Nachtmusik	Wir stimmen dir mit Flötensang	July 1825	Text by Seckendorff; For ttbb
849	944				Gmunden-Gastein Symphony	C major	Jun.–Sep. 1825	Probably identical to D 944 (if not: lost); See also D Anh. I/6A
850	850	53 (1826)	X No. 11	VII/2, 2 No. 15	Piano Sonata, D 850 ("Gasteiner")	D major	August 1825	Allegro vivace – Con moto – Scherzo – Rondo
851	851	79,1 (1827) (1895)	XX, 8 No. 478	IV, 3	Das Heimweh, D 851	Ach, der Gebirgssohn	August 1825	Text by Pyrker; Two versions: 2nd is Op. 79 No. 1
852	852	79,2 (1827)	XX, 8 No. 479	IV, 3	Die Allmacht, D 852	Groß ist Jehova, der Herr!	August 1825	Text by Pyrker (other setting: D 875A); Two versions: 2nd, in AGA, is Op. 79 No. 2
853	853	93,2 (1828) (1835)	XX, 8 No. 477	IV, 5	Auf der Bruck	Frisch trabe sonder Ruh' und Rast	Mar. or Aug. 1825– Sep. 1827	Text by Schulze; Two versions: 2nd, publ. 1828, in AGA
854	854	(1830)	XX, 8 No. 480	IV, 13	Fülle der Liebe	Ein sehnend Streben teilt mir das Herz	August 1825	Text by Schlegel, F.
855	855	(1842)	XX, 8 No. 481	IV, 13	Wiedersehn	Der Frühlingssonne holdes Lächeln	September; 1825	Text by Schlegel, A. W.
856	856	88,1 (1827)	XX, 8 No. 482	IV, 4	Abendlied für die Entfernte	Hinaus mein Blick, hinaus ins Tal	September; 1825	Text by Schlegel, A. W.
857	857	124p (1829)	XX, 8 Nos. 483– 484	IV, 13	Two scenes from Lacrimas: 1. Lied der Delphine – 2. Lied des Florio	1. Ach, was soll ich beginnen vor Liebe? – 2. Nun, da Schatten niedergleiten	September; 1825	Text by Schütz
859	859	55 (1826)	IX, 1 No. 4	VII/1, 4	Grande Marche Funèbre	C minor	after 1/12/1825	For piano duet
860	860	(1832)	XX, 8 No. 485	IV, 13	An mein Herz	O Herz, sei endlich stille	December; 1825	Text by Schulze
861	861	(1832)	XX, 8 No. 486	IV, 13	Der liebliche Stern	Ihr Sternlein, still in der Höhe	December; 1825	Text by Schulze
862	862	88,3 (1827)	XX, 8 No. 499	IV, 4	Um Mitternacht	Keine Stimme hör' ich schallen	Dec. 1825– Mar. 1826?	Text by Schulze; Two versions: 2nd is Op. 88 No. 3

== Sources ==
Multi-volume editions, websites and catalogues

- Alte Gesamt-Ausgabe (AGA) = Franz Schubert's Works: Schubert, Franz (1884–1897). Johannes Brahms; Ignaz Brüll; Anton Door; Julius Epstein; Johann Nepomuk Fuchs; Josef Gänsbacher; Joseph Hellmesberger Sr.; Eusebius Mandyczewski (eds.). Franz Schubert's Werke: Kritisch durchgesehene Gesammtausgabe (in German). Leipzig: Breitkopf & Härtel. Reprints of several volumes by Kalmus and Dover Publications; Franz Schubert's Werke (Series I–XIX and XXI), Series XX, Revisionsbericht: Scores at the International Music Score Library Project
- Deutsch catalogue (D) = Schubert Thematic Catalogue:
  - Deutsch, Otto Erich; et al. (Donald R. Wakeling) (1951). Schubert: Thematic Catalogue of all his Works in Chronological Order (1st ed.). London: Dent. 1995 reprint, with errata correction: Deutsch, Otto Erich; et al. (Donald R. Wakeling) (1995). The Schubert Thematic Catalogue (Dover ed.). Mineola, N.Y.: Dover Publications. ISBN 0486286851.
  - Deutsch, Otto Erich (1978). Walther Dürr; Arnold Feil; Christa Landon [in German]; Werner Aderhold (eds.). Franz Schubert: Thematisches Verzeichnis seiner Werke in chronologischer Folge. New Schubert Edition (in German). Kassel: Bärenreiter. ISBN 9783761805718. ISMN 9790006305148.
    - Series VIII (Supplement)
    - Volume 4
- Hoboken catalogue (Hob.): "Joseph Haydn (1732–1809): Werke sortiert nach Hob (Hoboken-Verzeichnis, 1957-78)" (in German). Kaiserslautern: Klassika.
- Köchel catalogue (K.): "Wolfgang Amadeus Mozart (1756–1791): Werke sortiert nach KV^{6} (Köchel-Verzeichnis, 6. Auflage, 1964)" (in German). Kaiserslautern: Klassika.
- Neue Schubert-Ausgabe (NSA) = New Schubert Edition:
  - NSA scores: Schubert, Franz (1968–2019). International Schubert Association (Tübingen) (ed.). Franz Schubert (1797–1828): New Edition of the Complete Works (in German). Kassel: Bärenreiter. [over 80 volumes in eight series] Individual volumes:
    - NSA II, 15: Schubert, Franz; Neumann, Johann Philipp (2008). Jahrmärker, Manuela; Aigner, Thomas (eds.). Sacontala. New Schubert Edition (in German). Kassel: Bärenreiter. ISMN 9790006497294.
      - Series II (Stage Works), Vol. 15
    - NSA VIII, 4: See above Deutsch (1978)
  - NSA website: "New Schubert Edition". Tübingen: International Schubert Association.
- Schubert Online: "www.schubert-online.at: Schubert music manuscripts, first and early editions online". Vienna: Austrian Academy of Sciences (ÖAW).
- The LiederNet Archive: Ezust, Emily; et al. (LiederNet contributors). "Composer: Franz Peter Schubert (1797 - 1828)". Ontario: LiederNet Corporation.

Other

- Badura-Skoda, Eva; Branscombe, Peter, eds. (2008). Schubert Studies: Problems of Style and Chronology. Cambridge University Press. ISBN 0521088720.
  - Walther Dürr "Schubert's Songs and Their Poetry" pp. 1–24
  - Rufus Hallmark "Schubert's 'Auf dem Strom'" pp. 25–46
  - Elaine Brody "Schubert and Sulzer Revisited" pp. 47–60
  - Marius Flothuis "Schubert Revises Schubert" pp. 61–84
  - Elizabeth Norman McKay "Schubert as Composer of Operas" pp. 85–104
  - Peter Branscombe "Schubert and the Melodrama" pp. 105–142
  - Christoph Wolff "Schubert's 'Der Tod und dad Mädchen'" pp. 143–172
  - Peter Gülke on String Quintet D 956 pp. 173–186
  - Paul Badura-Skoda on Schubert's 'Great' C major Symphony pp. 187–208
  - Robert Winter "Paper Studies and the Future of Schubert Research" pp. 209–276
  - Eva Badura-Skoda "The Chronology of Schubert's Piano Trios" pp. 277–296
  - Reinhard Van Hoorickx "The Chronology of Schubert's Fragments and Sketches" pp. 297–326
  - Arnold Feil "Rhythm in Schubert" pp. 327–346
  - Alexander Weinmann on Leopold Puschl and Schubert's sojourn in Zseliz pp. 347–356
- Elsholz, Gunter (1982). Vogel, Reimut (ed.). Franz Schubert: Sinfonie in E-Dur 1825. Stuttgart: Goldoni. ISBN 3922044050. OCLC 987719669.
- Hilmar, Ernst; Jestremski, Margret, eds. (2004). Schubert-Enzyklopädie (in German). Vol. 1. Introduction by Alfred Brendel. Tutzing: Hans Schneider. ISBN 3795211557.
- Keefe, Simon P., ed. (2006). Mozart Studies. Cambridge University Press. ISBN 0521851025.
- Kube, Michael (2009). "Franz Schuberts Deutsche Trauermesse (D 621) als Problem der Text- und Stilkritik". In Mitterauer, Gertraud; Müller, Ulrich; Springeth, Margarete; Vitzthum, Verena (eds.). Was ist Textkritik?: Zur Geschichte und Relevanz eines Zentralbegriffs der Editionswissenschaft (in German). Walter de Gruyter. pp. 129–140. ISBN 3484970782.
- Mozart, Wolfgang Amadeus; Haydn, Joseph; Haydn, Michael (2008). Kircher, Armin (ed.). Chorbuch Mozart • Haydn VII: Kanonsammlung [Choral Collection Mozart • Haydn, Vol. VII: Canon Collection] (in German, Latin, English, and Italian). Stuttgart: Carus-Verlag. OCLC 274222567.
- Newbould, Brian (1999). Schubert: The Music and the Man. University of California Press. ISBN 0520219570.
- Reed, John (1997). The Schubert Song Companion. Manchester University Press. ISBN 1901341003.
- Van Hoorickx, Reinhard (1971). "Franz Schubert (1797–1828) List of the Dances in Chronological Order". Revue belge de Musicologie / Belgisch Tijdschrift voor Muziekwetenschap. 25 (1). Belgian Musicological Society: 68–97. doi:10.2307/3686180. ISSN 0771-6788. JSTOR 3686180.
- Van Hoorickx, Reinhard (1974–1976). "Thematic Catalogue of Schubert's Works: New Additions, Corrections and Notes". Revue belge de Musicologie / Belgisch Tijdschrift voor Muziekwetenschap. 28–30. Belgian Musicological Society: 136–171. doi:10.2307/3686053. ISSN 0771-6788. JSTOR 3686053.
