= List of compositions by Franz Schubert (1828) =

Franz Schubert's compositions of 1828 are mostly in the Deutsch catalogue (D) range D 936A–965B, and include:

- Instrumental works:
  - Symphony No. 9, D 944 (completed in 1828)
  - Symphony No. 10, D 936A
  - String Quintet, D 956
  - Fantasia in F minor for piano four-hands, D 940
  - Three last piano sonatas, D. 958–960
- Vocal music:
  - Mass No. 6, D 950
  - Schwanengesang, D 957
  - "The Shepherd on the Rock", D 965

== Table ==
=== Legend ===
Legend to the table
column		content
1	D '51	Deutsch number in the first version of the Deutsch catalogue (1951)
2	D utd	most recent (utd = up to date) Deutsch catalogue number; the basic collation of the list is according to these numbers – whether or not the possibility to adjust the sorting according to the content of other columns is available depends on the device with which the table is displayed.
3	Op. pbl	Opus number (Op.; p indicates Post. = posthumous) and date of first publication (pbl; between brackets; when there is more than one date the earlier dates indicate partial publications). The column sorts to Opus number, then (earliest of) the publication date(s)
4	AGA	Alte Gesamt-Ausgabe = Franz Schubert's Werke: Kritisch durchgesehene Gesammtausgabe. Indicates genre/instrumentation: Series I: Symphonien (Nos. 1-8) (Johannes Brahms, 1884); Series II: Overtüren und Andere Orchesterwerke (Johann Nepomuk Fuchs, 1886); Series III: Oktette (Nos. 1-3) and IV: Streichquintett (Eusebius Mandyczewski, 1889); Series V: Streichquartette (Nos. 1-15) (Joseph Hellmesberger and Eusebius Mandyczewski, 1890); Series VI: Trio für Streichinstrumente (Eusebius Mandyczewski, 1892); Series VII: Trios, Quartets and Quintets with Piano and VIII: Pianoforte und Ein Instrument (Ignaz Brüll, 1886); Series IX: Pianoforte zu vier Händen (Anton Door, 1888); Series X: Sonaten für Pianoforte (Julius Epstein, 1888); Series XI: Fantasie, Impromptus und andere Stücke für Pianoforte (Julius Epstein, 1888); Series XII: Tänze für Pianoforte (Nos. 1-31) (Julius Epstein, 1889); Series XIII: Messen (Nos. 1-7) (Eusebius Mandyczewski, 1887); Series XIV: Kleinere Kirchenmusikwerke (Nos. 1-22) (Eusebius Mandyczewski, 1888); Series XV: Dramatische Musik (Johann Nepomuk Fuchs, 1893); Series XVI: Werke für Männerchor (Nos. 1-46) (Eusebius Mandyczewski, 1891); Series XVII: Werke für gemischten Chor (Nos. 1-19) (Josef Gänsbacher, Eusebius Mandyczewski, 1892); Series XVIII: Werke für Drei und mehr Frauenstimmen mit Pianoforte-Begleitung (Nos. 1-6) (Josef Gänsbacher, Eusebius Mandyczewski, 1891); Series XIX: Kleine Gesangswerke (Nos. 1-36) (Josef Gänsbacher and Eusebius Mandyczewski, 1892); Series XX: Sämtliche einstimmige Lieder und Gesänge (Eusebius Mandyczewski, 1894-1895); Series XXI: Supplement (Eusebius Mandyczewski, 1897); 1. Instrumentalmusik No. 1-5; 2. Instrumentalmusik No. 6-13; 3. Instrumentalmusik No. 14-; 4. Gesangsmusik; Series XXII: Revisionsbericht
5	NSA	NGA/NSA/NSE = New Schubert Edition, also indicates genre/instrumentation: Series I: Church Music; Series II: Stage Works; Series III: Part Songs; Series IV: Lieder; Series V: Orchestral Works; Series VI: Chamber Music; 1. Octet and Nonet; 2. String Quintet; 3. String Quartets I; 4. String Quartets II; 5. String Quartets III; 6. String Trios; 7. Works for Piano and several instruments; 8. Works for Piano and one instrument; 9. Dances for several instruments; Series VII: Piano Music; 1. Works for Piano Four Hands; 2. Works for Piano Two Hands; Series VIII: Supplement, 2. Schubert's Studies
6	Name	unique name, with, if available, a link to the relevant encyclopedia article; sorts by name with initial definite ("Der", "Die", "Das", ...) or indefinite ("Ein", "A", ...) articles, and numbers, moved after the expression they qualify: e.g. "Die Hoffnung, ..." sorts as "Hoffnung, Die, ..." – "Thirty Minuets ..." sorts as "Minuets, 30, ...".
7	Key / incipit	incipit mostly for songs (linking to lyrics and their translation, for instance at The LiederNet Archive, when available), other compositions by key, except for Schubert's stage works: type of composition in brackets.
8	Date	(presumed) date of composition, or, for copies and arrangements, date of Schubert's autograph. Sorts to earliest possible date of completion, unlike the chronology of the Deutsch catalogue that generally collates according to earliest date associated with the composition: e.g. Schubert started the composition of his 3rd String Quartet on 19 November 1812 and completed it on 21 February 1813 – in the Deutsch catalogue the composition is grouped with other compositions from 1812: when using the sort function of the 8th column the composition is grouped with compositions completed in 1813
9	Additional info	may include: Information about the text (lyrics, libretto) of vocal compositions: e.g., "Text by [text author]", "Text: [standard lyrics]", "... from [literary work]"; "other settings: D ..." indicates Schubert's other settings of the same text; for fields starting with "Text ..." this column sorts by text author (last name, first name—or pen name when such name is more established), then incipit of the lyrics (alternatively, when the incipit is rarely used, title of the work); Information about the authenticity of the composition: the work is without doubt Schubert's unless when marked as "Doubtful", "Spurious?" or "Spurious" (in the last case columns 3–8 give no further information about the composition); Forces needed for performance ("For ..."): may be omitted when the type of composition makes the instrumentation clear (e.g. String Quartet → two violins, viola and cello), and, for vocal music, when the setting is for voice and piano; "s", "a", "t" and "b" refer to a single soprano, alto, tenor and bass singer respectively, while "S", "A", "T" and "B" to choral parts for the same types of singers (see SATB).; Specifications regarding movements (e.g. "Allegro – Minuet – Rondo") or sections (e.g. "No. 1 ..."); Information about the completeness of the extant work: the work is considered complete as extant unless when marked "Sketch", "Incomplete", "Unfinished", "Fragment" or "Lost"; Information about versions (e.g. "Two versions: ...")

=== List ===
Compositions by Franz Schubert listed in the Deutsch catalogue for 1828
D '51	D utd	Op. pbl	AGA	NSA	Name	Key / incipit	Date	Additional info
615	936A			V, 6 No. 11 & Anh. 2	Symphony No. 10	D major	spring– summer 1828?	Sketches for [Allegro maestoso] (two versions) – Andante – Scherzo (two versions)
937	937	(1872)	XX, 10; No. 602	IV, 14	Lebensmut, D 937	Fröhlicher Lebensmut	summer 1828?	Text by Rellstab; Fragment
938	938	(1835)	XX, 9 No. 551	IV, 14	Der Winterabend, D 938	Es ist so still, so heimlich um mich	January; 1828	Text by Leitner
939	939	96,1 (1828)	XX, 9 No. 552	IV, 5	Die Sterne, D 939	Wie blitzen die Sterne so hell durch die Nacht	January; 1828	Text by Leitner
940	940	103 (1829)	IX, 3 No. 24	VII/1, 3 No. 2 & Anh. No. 1	Fantasy, D 940	F minor	January– April 1828	For piano duet
941	948							See D 948, 1st version
942	942	136p (1839)	XVII; No. 9	III, 2b No. 18	Mirjams Siegesgesang	Rührt die Zimbel, schlagt die Saiten – Aus ägypten vor dem Volke – Doch der Horizont erdunkelt – S'ist der Herr in seinem Grimme – Tauchst du auf, Pharao? – Drum mit Zimbeln und mit Saiten	March 1828	Text by Grillparzer; For sSATB and piano
943	943	119p (1829)	XX, 10; No. 568	IV, 14	Auf dem Strom	Nimm die letzten Abschiedsküsse	March 1828	Text by Rellstab; For voice, horn (or cello) and piano
944; 849	944	(1840)	I, 2 No. 7	V, 4 No. 8	Symphony No. 9, Great C major	C major	summer 1825?– March 1828	Andante, Allegro ma non troppo – Andante con moto – Scherzo – Allegro vivace; Probably identical to Gmunden-Gastein Symphony, D 849
944A	944A				German Dance, D 944A		1/3/1828	For piano; Lost
945	945	(1895)	XX, 10; No. 589	IV, 14	Herbst, D 945	Es rauschen die Winde	April 1828	Text by Rellstab
946	946	(1868)	XI No. 13	VII/2, 5	Three piano pieces, a.k.a. Impromptus, D 946	E♭ minor – E♭ major – C major	May 1828	Allegro assai, Andante – Allegretto – Allegro
947	947	144p (1840)	IX, 3 No. 23	VII/1, 3 No. 3	Allegro, D 947, a.k.a. Lebensstürme	A minor	May 1828	For piano duet
948; 941; 964	948	(1891); 154p (1849)	XVI; No. 42 (1st v.) & No. 2 (2nd v.)	I, 9 No. 15–16 & Anh. 3	Hymnus an den heiligen Geist	Komm, heil'ger Geist, erhöre unser Flehen (1st v.); Herr, unser Gott! erhöre unser Flehen (2nd v.)	May 1828	Text by Schmidl; Two versions: 1st, for ttbbTTBB, was D 941 – 2nd, Op. posth. 154 for ttbbTTBB and winds, was D 964
949	639							See D 639
950	950	(1865)	XIII, 2 No. 6	I, 4	Mass No. 6	E♭ major Kyrie – Gloria – Credo – Sanctus & Benedictus – Agnus Dei	started June 1828	Text: Mass ordinary (other settings: D 24E, 31, 45, 49, 56, 66, 105, 167, 324, 452, 678 and 755); For satbSATB and orchestra
951	951	107 (1829)	IX, 2 No. 13	VII/1, 3 No. 4 & Anh. No. 2	Rondo, D 951, a.k.a. Grand Rondeau	A major	June 1828	For piano duet
952	952	152p (1848)	IX, 3 No. 28	VII/1, 3 No. 5	Fugue, D 952	E minor	3/6/1828	For organ duet or piano duet
953	953	(1841)	XVII; No. 19	III, 2b No. 19	Psalm 92 (91)	tôw l'hôdôs ladônoj	July 1828	Text: Psalm 92; For baritone and satbSATB
954	954	(1828)	XVII; No. 5	III, 2b No. 20	Glaube, Hoffnung und Liebe, D 954	Gott, laß die Glocke glücklich steigen	before 2/9/1828	Text by Reil; For ttbbSATB acc. by winds or piano
955	955	97 (1828)	XX, 8 No. 462	IV, 5	Glaube, Hoffnung und Liebe, D 955	Glaube, hoffe, liebe!	August; 1828	Text by Kuffner
956	956	163p (1853)	IV No. 1	VI, 2 No. 2	String Quintet	C major	September; 1828?	Allegro ma non troppo – Adagio – Presto – Allegretto; For two violins, viola and two cellos
957; Nos. 1–13	957	(1829)	XX, 9 Nos. 554– 566	IV, 14	Schwanengesang, D 957, a.k.a. 13 Lieder nach Gedichten von Rellstab und Heine: —Rellstab—: 1. Liebesbotschaft – 2. Kriegers Ahnung – 3. Frühlingssehnsucht – 4. Ständchen – 5. Aufenhalt – 6. In der Ferne – 7. Abschied; —Heine—: 8. Der Atlas – 9. Ihr Bild – 11. Die Stadt – 12. Am Meer – 13. Der Doppelgänger	1. Rauschendes Bächlein, so silber und hell – 2. In tiefer Ruh liegt um mich her – 3. Säuselnde Lüfte wehen so mild – 4. Leise flehen meine Lieder – 5. Rauschender Strom, brausender Wald – 6. Wehe dem Fliehenden – 7. Ade! du muntre, du fröhliche Stadt – 8. Ich unglückselger Atlas – 9. Ich stand in dunkeln Träumen – 10. Das Fischermädchen – 11. Am fernen Horizonte – 12. Das Meer erglänzte weit hinaus – 13. Still ist die Nacht, es ruhen die Gassen	August– September? 1828	Text by Rellstab (Nos. 1–7) and Heine, H. (Nos. 8–13); D 965A was No. 14; Early versions for Nos. 1 and 3; Variant for No. 4
958	958	(1839)	X No. 13	VII/2, 3 No. 17	Piano Sonata, D 958	C minor	September; 1828	Allegro – Adagio – Minuet – Allegro
959	959	(1839)	X No. 14	VII/2, 3 No. 18	Piano Sonata, D 959	A major	September; 1828	Allegro – Andantino – Scherzo – Allegretto (partly based on 2nd movement of D 537)
960	960	(1839)	X No. 15	VII/2, 3 No. 19	Piano Sonata, D 960	B♭ major	September; 1828	Molto moderato – Andante sostenuto – Scherzo – Allegro ma non troppo
961	452							See D 452
962	962	(1890)	XXI, 4 No. 32	I, 9 No. 10 & Anh. 4	Tantum ergo, D 962	E♭ major	October; 1828	Text by Aquinas (other settings: D 460, 461, 730, 739, 750 and Anh. I/17); For satbSATB and orchestra; Sketch in AGA XIV No. 22
963	963	(1890)	XXI, 4 No. 33	I, 8	Intende voci, a.k.a. Offertory, D 963, or Aria for tenor with choir	B♭ major	October; 1828	Text: Psalm 5:3–4a, offertory for the Friday after Oculi Sunday; For tSATB and orchestra
964	948	154p (1849)	XVI; No. 2			Herr, unser Gott! erhöre unser Flehen		See D 948, 2nd version
965	965	129p (1830)	XX, 10; No. 569	IV, 14	Der Hirt auf dem Felsen	Wenn auf dem höchsten Fels ich steh	October; 1828	Text by Müller, W., and Varnhagen von Ense; For voice, clarinet and piano
957; No. 14	965A	(1829)	XX, 9 No. 567	IV, 14	Die Taubenpost	Ich hab' eine Brieftaub in meinem Sold	October; 1828	Text by Seidl; Was D 957 No. 14
	965B			VIII, 2 Nos. 15–16	Fugal exercises, D 965B		November; 1828	Partly similar to D 952

== Sources ==
Multi-volume editions, websites and catalogues

- Alte Gesamt-Ausgabe (AGA) = Franz Schubert's Works: Schubert, Franz (1884–1897). Johannes Brahms; Ignaz Brüll; Anton Door; Julius Epstein; Johann Nepomuk Fuchs; Josef Gänsbacher; Joseph Hellmesberger Sr.; Eusebius Mandyczewski (eds.). Franz Schubert's Werke: Kritisch durchgesehene Gesammtausgabe (in German). Leipzig: Breitkopf & Härtel. Reprints of several volumes by Kalmus and Dover Publications; Franz Schubert's Werke (Series I–XIX and XXI), Series XX, Revisionsbericht: Scores at the International Music Score Library Project
- Deutsch catalogue (D) = Schubert Thematic Catalogue:
  - Deutsch, Otto Erich; et al. (Donald R. Wakeling) (1951). Schubert: Thematic Catalogue of all his Works in Chronological Order (1st ed.). London: Dent. 1995 reprint, with errata correction: Deutsch, Otto Erich; et al. (Donald R. Wakeling) (1995). The Schubert Thematic Catalogue (Dover ed.). Mineola, N.Y.: Dover Publications. ISBN 0486286851.
  - Deutsch, Otto Erich (1978). Walther Dürr; Arnold Feil; Christa Landon [in German]; Werner Aderhold (eds.). Franz Schubert: Thematisches Verzeichnis seiner Werke in chronologischer Folge. New Schubert Edition (in German). Kassel: Bärenreiter. ISBN 9783761805718. ISMN 9790006305148.
    - Series VIII (Supplement)
    - Volume 4
- Hoboken catalogue (Hob.): "Joseph Haydn (1732–1809): Werke sortiert nach Hob (Hoboken-Verzeichnis, 1957-78)" (in German). Kaiserslautern: Klassika.
- Köchel catalogue (K.): "Wolfgang Amadeus Mozart (1756–1791): Werke sortiert nach KV^{6} (Köchel-Verzeichnis, 6. Auflage, 1964)" (in German). Kaiserslautern: Klassika.
- Neue Schubert-Ausgabe (NSA) = New Schubert Edition:
  - NSA scores: Schubert, Franz (1968–2019). International Schubert Association (Tübingen) (ed.). Franz Schubert (1797–1828): New Edition of the Complete Works (in German). Kassel: Bärenreiter. [over 80 volumes in eight series] Individual volumes:
    - NSA II, 15: Schubert, Franz; Neumann, Johann Philipp (2008). Jahrmärker, Manuela; Aigner, Thomas (eds.). Sacontala. New Schubert Edition (in German). Kassel: Bärenreiter. ISMN 9790006497294.
      - Series II (Stage Works), Vol. 15
    - NSA VIII, 4: See above Deutsch (1978)
  - NSA website: "New Schubert Edition". Tübingen: International Schubert Association.
- Schubert Online: "www.schubert-online.at: Schubert music manuscripts, first and early editions online". Vienna: Austrian Academy of Sciences (ÖAW).
- The LiederNet Archive: Ezust, Emily; et al. (LiederNet contributors). "Composer: Franz Peter Schubert (1797 - 1828)". Ontario: LiederNet Corporation.

Other

- Badura-Skoda, Eva; Branscombe, Peter, eds. (2008). Schubert Studies: Problems of Style and Chronology. Cambridge University Press. ISBN 0521088720.
  - Walther Dürr "Schubert's Songs and Their Poetry" pp. 1–24
  - Rufus Hallmark "Schubert's 'Auf dem Strom'" pp. 25–46
  - Elaine Brody "Schubert and Sulzer Revisited" pp. 47–60
  - Marius Flothuis "Schubert Revises Schubert" pp. 61–84
  - Elizabeth Norman McKay "Schubert as Composer of Operas" pp. 85–104
  - Peter Branscombe "Schubert and the Melodrama" pp. 105–142
  - Christoph Wolff "Schubert's 'Der Tod und dad Mädchen'" pp. 143–172
  - Peter Gülke on String Quintet D 956 pp. 173–186
  - Paul Badura-Skoda on Schubert's 'Great' C major Symphony pp. 187–208
  - Robert Winter "Paper Studies and the Future of Schubert Research" pp. 209–276
  - Eva Badura-Skoda "The Chronology of Schubert's Piano Trios" pp. 277–296
  - Reinhard Van Hoorickx "The Chronology of Schubert's Fragments and Sketches" pp. 297–326
  - Arnold Feil "Rhythm in Schubert" pp. 327–346
  - Alexander Weinmann on Leopold Puschl and Schubert's sojourn in Zseliz pp. 347–356
- Elsholz, Gunter (1982). Vogel, Reimut (ed.). Franz Schubert: Sinfonie in E-Dur 1825. Stuttgart: Goldoni. ISBN 3922044050. OCLC 987719669.
- Hilmar, Ernst; Jestremski, Margret, eds. (2004). Schubert-Enzyklopädie (in German). Vol. 1. Introduction by Alfred Brendel. Tutzing: Hans Schneider. ISBN 3795211557.
- Keefe, Simon P., ed. (2006). Mozart Studies. Cambridge University Press. ISBN 0521851025.
- Kube, Michael (2009). "Franz Schuberts Deutsche Trauermesse (D 621) als Problem der Text- und Stilkritik". In Mitterauer, Gertraud; Müller, Ulrich; Springeth, Margarete; Vitzthum, Verena (eds.). Was ist Textkritik?: Zur Geschichte und Relevanz eines Zentralbegriffs der Editionswissenschaft (in German). Walter de Gruyter. pp. 129–140. ISBN 3484970782.
- Mozart, Wolfgang Amadeus; Haydn, Joseph; Haydn, Michael (2008). Kircher, Armin (ed.). Chorbuch Mozart • Haydn VII: Kanonsammlung [Choral Collection Mozart • Haydn, Vol. VII: Canon Collection] (in German, Latin, English, and Italian). Stuttgart: Carus-Verlag. OCLC 274222567.
- Newbould, Brian (1999). Schubert: The Music and the Man. University of California Press. ISBN 0520219570.
- Reed, John (1997). The Schubert Song Companion. Manchester University Press. ISBN 1901341003.
- Van Hoorickx, Reinhard (1971). "Franz Schubert (1797–1828) List of the Dances in Chronological Order". Revue belge de Musicologie / Belgisch Tijdschrift voor Muziekwetenschap. 25 (1). Belgian Musicological Society: 68–97. doi:10.2307/3686180. ISSN 0771-6788. JSTOR 3686180.
- Van Hoorickx, Reinhard (1974–1976). "Thematic Catalogue of Schubert's Works: New Additions, Corrections and Notes". Revue belge de Musicologie / Belgisch Tijdschrift voor Muziekwetenschap. 28–30. Belgian Musicological Society: 136–171. doi:10.2307/3686053. ISSN 0771-6788. JSTOR 3686053.
