= New Schubert Edition =

Compilation of works by Franz Schubert

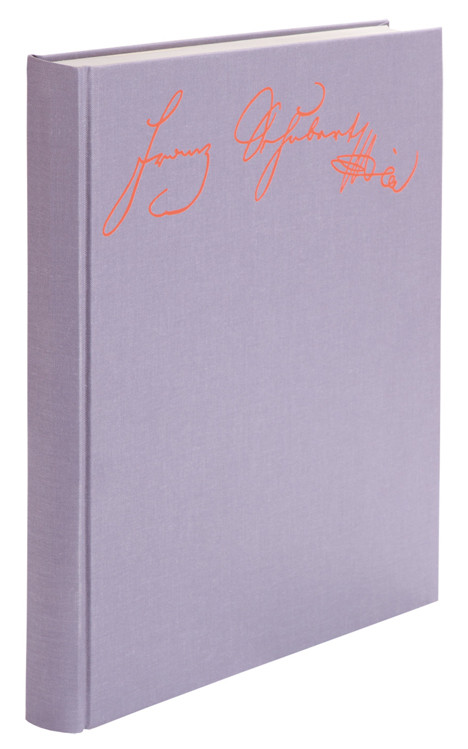
Neue Schubert-Ausgabe

Franz Schubert (1797–1828): New Edition of the Complete Works (Franz Schubert (1797–1828): Neue Ausgabe sämtlicher Werke), commonly known as the New Schubert Edition (NSE), or, in German: Neue Schubert-Ausgabe (NSA), is a complete edition of Franz Schubert's works, which started in 1956 and is scheduled to conclude in 2027. The projected number of volumes of the publication, which includes score editions, critical reports and supplements, is 177, of which, as of 2020, 150 have been realised.

The International Schubert Society, initiated in 1963 for this purpose, is the driving force behind the edition. Its score and supplement volumes are published by Bärenreiter. The NSE is a successor to Franz Schubert's Werke: Kritisch durchgesehene Gesammtausgabe: this old collected edition (in German: Alte Gesamt-Ausgabe, AGA), was published by Breitkopf & Härtel in the late 19th century, and the successor is sometimes referred to as new collected edition, in German: Neue Gesamt-Ausgabe (NGA).

== History ==
Eusebius Mandyczewski's critical report of the last volume of the Alte Gesamt-Ausgabe was published in 1897, a century after Schubert's birth. The old collected edition has a limited critical apparatus, and soon after its completion previously unknown works by Schubert were discovered. From the 1950s ideas about a new and updated collected edition of Schubert's works began to emerge. The International Schubert Society was founded in 1963, 135 years after the composer's death, with the sole purpose of supporting such endeavour. Walter Gerstenberg was appointed as head of the NSE's editorial board.

Otto Erich Deutsch, who had published the Schubert Thematic Catalogue, that is the Deutsch Catalogue, in 1951, became honorary president of the editorial board. In 1964, Bärenreiter published a new German version of Deutsch's Schubert: Die Dokumente seines Lebens (Schubert: A Documentary Biography) as one of the Supplement volumes of the NSE. In 1965, the editorial board became fully operational, with members such as Walther Dürr, Arnold Feil and Christa Landon. Offices for the edition were set up in Tübingen and Vienna. The first score volume was published in 1967.

Among the sponsors of the NSE project are the Austrian Academy of Sciences and the Union of German Academies of Sciences and Humanities and its member organization Academy of Sciences and Literature of Mainz (AdW Mainz). In 1969 Feil and Dürr published an article about some of the challenges of the project in the Österreichische Musikzeitschrift. A 1973 article by Dürr, Feil and Landon, in Die Musikforschung, explains the project's approach to the publication of critical reports.

== Content ==
The New Schubert Edition was planned with 83 main volumes (numerische Bände, lit. 'numerical volumes') in eight series: the first seven series containing 73 volumes with music scores (Notenbände), each complemented with a critical report (Kritischer Bericht, KB), and the last series containing ten supplementing volumes (Supplementbände). The realized number of volumes (reale Bände, lit. 'real volumes') exceeds the number of initially planned volumes: some volumes were split in sub-volumes (Teilbände, lit. 'partial volumes'), and some supplemental volumes were added to series I–VII.

Bärenreiter-Verlag publishes the scores and supplements, and the critical reports are published by the International Schubert Society. Counted in reale Bände, 76 of the projected 101 score and supplement volumes had materialised by the end of 2010, as had 47 of the critical reports. By late March 2015, the number of completed main volumes was 65 (out of 83), and the NSE project was scheduled to finish in 2027. By the end of 2015, 84 main volumes were planned (of which 68 were complete), and 84 score and supplement volumes, together with 61 critical reports, were published.

NSE volumes
Series	Planned		Realized as of 2026		Completion	
Series	Main	KB	Score & Suppl.	KB	Main	KB
I: Church Music	9	9	10	10		
II: Stage Works	18	18	20	20		
III: Part Songs	4	4	6	6	2024	2025
IV: Lieder	15	14	21	20	2015	2014
V: Orchestral Works	7	7	8	8	2020	2024
VI: Chamber Music	9	9	9	8	1994	
VII: Piano Music, 1. Four Hands	5	5	5	5	2011	2012
VII: Piano Music, 2. Two Hands	7	7	8	7	2003	2014
VIII: Supplement	9	1	6	0		
Total	83	74	93	84		

=== Series I: Church Music ===
Series I: Church Music (Kirchenmusik), 9 volumes:

1. Masses:
  1. No. 1 in F major, D 105, edited by Talia Pecker Berio (1990). Critical Report by Michael Kube based on Pecker Berio's preparations (2003).
  2. No. 2 in G major, D 167, edited by Christine Martin (2024). Critical Report by Martin (2024).
2. Masses No. 3 in B♭ major, D 324, and No. 4 in C major, D 452, edited by Rossana Dalmonte and Pier Paolo Scattolin (1982). Critical Report by Kube based on Dalmonte's and Scattolin's preparations (2010).
3. Mass No. 5 in A♭ major, D 678, edited by Doris Finke-Hecklinger (1980: two volumes). Critical Report by Dürr and Finke-Hecklinger (1981).
4. Mass No. 6 in E♭ major, D 950, edited by Rudolf Faber (2022). Critical Report by Faber (2023).
5. Mass settings: separate movements and fragments, D 31, 45, 49, 56, 66, 24E, 453 and 755, edited by Manuela Jahrmärker and Volkmar von Pechstaedt (1998). Critical Report by Jahrmärker and Pechstaedt (1999).
6. Deutsche Messe, D 872, and German Requiem, D 621, edited by Kube (2001). Critical Report by Kube (2002).
7. German Stabat Mater in F minor, D 383, edited by Jahrmärker (1996). Critical Report by Jahrmärker (1998).
8. Smaller Church Music Works I: Salve Regina, D 27, Alleluja, D 71A, Salve Regina, D 106, Offertory, D 136, etc.
9. Smaller Church Music Works II: Stabat Mater in G minor, D 175, Magnificat in C major, D 486, etc., edited by Rudolf Faber (2014). Critical Report by Faber (2016).

=== Series II: Stage Works ===
Series II: Stage Works (Bühnenwerke), 18 volumes:

1. Des Teufels Lustschloß, D 84, edited by Uta Hertin-Loeser (two volumes: 1989 and 1990). Critical Report by Christine Martin, Walburga Litschauer and Hertin-Loeser (2003).
2. Der vierjährige Posten, D 190 and Fernando, D 220, edited by Han Theill (1992). Critical Report by Kube and Theill (2006).
3. Die Freunde von Salamanka, D 326, edited by Marco Beghelli (2003). Critical Report by Kube based on Beghelli's preparations (2004).
4. Die Zauberharfe, D 644, edited by Rossana Dalmonte (1975). Critical Report by Dalmonte (1983).
5. Die Zwillingsbrüder, D 647.
6. Alfonso und Estrella, D 732, edited by Dürr (three volumes: 1993, 1994 and 1995). Critical Report by Dürr (1999).
7. Die Verschworenen, D 787.
8. Fierabras, D 796, edited by Thomas A. Denny and Chr. Martin (three volumes: 2005, 2007 and 2009). Critical Report by Chr. Martin based on Denny's and Dürr's preparations (2011).
9. Rosamunde, Fürstin von Cypern, D 797, edited by Chr. Martin and Dürr (2015). Critical Report by Chr. Martin and Dürr (2015).
10. Lazarus, D 689, edited by Reinhold Kubik (1987). Critical Report by Kubik (2002).
11. Der Spiegelritter, D 11, edited by Felix Loy (2023). Critical Report by Loy (2024).
12. Adrast, D 137, edited by Mario Aschauer (2010). Critical Report by Aschauer (2011).
13. Die Bürgschaft, D 435.
14. Claudine von Villa Bella, D 239, edited by Chr. and Dieter Martin (2011). Critical Report by Chr. Martin (2012).
15. Sacontala, D 701, edited by Jahrmärker and Thomas Aigner (2008). Critical Report by Jahrmärker and Chr. Martin (2009).
16. Rüdiger, D 791, and Sophie (?), D 982, edited by Jahrmärker and Christine Martin (2022). Critical Report by Jahrmärker and Martin (2023).
17. Der Graf von Gleichen, D 918, edited by Jahrmärker (2006). Critical Report by Jahrmärker (2006).
18. Opera Interludes: Duet and Aria for Hérold's Das Zauberglöckchen, D 723, edited by Chr. Martin (2010). Critical Report by Chr. Martin (2010).

=== Series III: Part Songs ===
Series III: Part Songs (Mehrstimmige Gesänge), four volumes:

1. Partsongs with orchestral accompaniment: "Gesang der Geister über den Wassern" (D 714), etc., edited by Vasiliki Papadopoulou and Michael Kube (2024). Critical report by Papadopoulou and Kube (2025).
2. Partsongs for Mixed Voices: "Mignon und der Harfner" (D 877, 1; Op. 62 No. 1), etc., edited by Dietrich Berke (two volumes: 1996 and 2006). Critical Report by Kube based on Werner Aderhold's preparation (2013).
3. Partsongs for Voices of the Same Register with Accompaniment: "Schwertlied" (D 170), "An die Freude" (D 189), "Ständchen" (D 920), "Gesang der Geister über den Wassern" (D 705), etc., edited by Chr. Martin and Dürr (2019: two volumes). Critical Report by Chr. Martin and Dürr (2021: two volumes).
4. Partsongs for Voices of the Same Register without Accompaniment: "Gesang der Geister über den Wassern" (D 538), etc., edited by Berke (1974, reprint 2013). Critical Report by Berke and Dürr (2017).

=== Series IV: Lieder ===
Series IV: 14 volumes of Lieder, all score editions and critical reports by Dürr, and a supplement volume:

1. Opp. 1 ("Erlkönig" (D. 328)), 2 ("Gretchen am Spinnrade" (D 118)), 3 (includes "Heidenröslein" (D 257)), 4 (includes "Der Wanderer" (D 489) and "Wandrers Nachtlied" (D 224)), 5 (includes "Rastlose Liebe" (D 138) and "Der König in Thule" (D 367)), 6, 7 (includes "Der Tod und das Mädchen" (D 531)), 8, 12 (Gesänge des Harfners aus "Wilhelm Meister" (D 478–480)), 13–14, 19 (includes "An Mignon" (D 161)), 20–21 and 22 (includes "Der Zwerg" (D 771)), etc. (1970: two volumes). Critical Report (1972).
2. Opp. 23–24, 25 (Die schöne Müllerin, D 795), 26 (Ariette from Rosamunde, D 797/3b), 31, 32 ("Die Forelle" (D 550)), 36–39, 41 and 43 (includes "Nacht und Träume" (D 827)), etc. (1975, reprinted 2013: two volumes). Critical Report (1979).
3. Opp. 44, 52 (Seven songs from Walter Scott's Lady of the Lake including "Ave Maria" (D. 839)), 56 (includes "Willkommen und Abschied" (D 767), 57–58, 59 (includes "Du bist die Ruh'" (D 776) and "Lachen und Weinen" (D 777)), 60, 62 (Gesänge aus Wilhelm Meister, D 877), 65, 68, 71, 72 ("Auf dem Wasser zu singen" (D 774)), 73 and 79, etc. (1982: 2 volumes). Critical Report (1985).
4. Opp. 80–81, 83 (Drei Gesänge, D 902), 85–87, 88 (includes "An die Musik" (D 547)) and 89 (Winterreise, D 911), etc. (1979: 2 volumes). Critical Report (1984).
5. Opp. 92–93, 95 (Vier Refrainlieder, D 866), 96 (includes "Wandrers Nachtlied" (D 768)), 97, 98 (includes "Wiegenlied" (D 498)), 101 (includes "Im Frühling" (D 882)), 105, 106 (includes "An Sylvia" (D 891)) and 108, and D 639, 731 and 518 (1985: 2 volumes). Critical Report (1999).
6. "Der Taucher" (D 77) and other Lieder in the D 5 to D 78 range which were first published after Op. 108 (1969, revised edition 2014). Critical Report (1972).
7. "Scene from Faust" (D 126), "Der Mondabend" (D 141) and other Lieder in the D 95 to D 159 range which were first published after Op. 108 (1968, revised edition 2013). Critical Report (1977).
8. "Amphiaraos" (D 166), "Die Bürgschaft" (D 246) and other Lieder in the D 163 to D 261 range which were first published after Op. 108 (2009). Critical Report (2013).
9. "Vaterlandslied" (D 287), "Mignon" (D 321), Hermann und Thusnelda (D 322) and other Lieder in the D 262 to D 329 range which were first published after Op. 108 (2011). Critical Report (2014).
10. Lieder in the D 342 to D 474 range which were first published after Op. 108 (2002). Critical Report (2009).
11. Lieder in the D 475 to D 594 range which were first published after Op. 108 (1999). Critical Report (2005).
12. "Prometheus" (D 674) and other Lieder in the D 611 to D 708 range which were first published after Op. 108 (1996). Critical Report (2004).
13. Lieder in the D 712 to D 864 range which were first published after Op. 108 (1992). Critical Report (2006).
14. "Ständchen" (D 889), Schwanengesang, D 957 (includes "Der Doppelgänger"), other Lieder in the D 869 to D 990C range which were first published after Op. 108 and Lieder with another accompaniment than a single piano (includes "Der Hirt auf dem Felsen" (D 965)) (1988: two volumes). Critical Report (2007).
15. Register, by Dürr and Susanne Eckstein (2015).

=== Series V: Orchestral Works ===
Series V: Orchestral Works (Orchesterwerke), 7 volumes:

1. Symphonies No. 1 (D 82), No. 2 (D 125) and No. 3 (D 200), edited by Feil and Landon (1967, and supplement 1977). Critical Report by Feil and Landon (1976).
2. Symphonies No. 4 (D 417), No. 5 (D 485) and No. 6 (D 589), edited by Feil and Douglas Woodfull-Harris (1999). Critical Report by Aschauer and Swenja Schekulin based on Feil's and Woodfull-Harris's preparations (2012).
3. Unfinished Symphony, D 759, edited by Aderhold (1997). Critical Report by Aderhold (2008).
4. Great C Major Symphony, D 944, edited by Aderhold (2003: two volumes). Critical Report by Aderhold (2007).
5. Overtures D 4 (Der Teufel als Hydraulicus), 12, 26 (two versions), 470, 556, 590 (in the Italian Style, restored version), 591 (in the Italian Style, two original versions) and 648, edited by Kube (2020). Critical report by Kube (2024).
6. Symphonic Sketches and Fragments D 2A, 2B (Symphony in D major), 2G, 74A, 71C, 94A, 729 (Symphony in E major, a.k.a. No. 7), 966B, 615 (Symphony in D major), 708A (Symphony in D major) and 936A (Symphony in D major, a.k.a. No. 10), edited by Kube (2012). Critical Report by Kube (2013).
7. Concert Pieces: Violin Concerto (D 345, incomplete), Rondo for Violin and Strings (D 438), Polonaise for violin and orchestra (D 580) and Adagio e Rondo concertante for piano quartet (D 487), edited by Kube (2008). Critical Report by Kube (2008).

=== Series VI: Chamber Music ===
Series VI: Chamber Music (Kammermusik), 9 volumes:

1. Wind Octet (D 72), Wind Nonet (D 79) and Octet (D 803), edited by Feil (1969). Critical Report by Hans-Günther Bauer and Feil (1985).
2. Overture for string quintet (D 8) and String Quintet (D 956), edited by Martin Chusid (1971). Critical Report by Chusid (1976).
3. String Quartets No. 1 (D 18), No. 2 (D 32), No. 3 (D 36), No. 4 (D 46), No. 5 (D 68) and No. 7 (D 94), and other compositions for string quartet (D 2C, 3 and 8A), edited by Chusid (1979).
4. String Quartets No. 6 (D 74), No. 8 (D 112), No. 9 (D 173), No. 10 (D. 87) and No. 11 (D 353), Quartettsatz (D 103), and other compositions for string quartet (D 86, 87A and 470), edited by Aderhold (1994). Critical Report by Aderhold (2010).
5. String Quartets No. 12 (D 703), No. 13 (D 804), No. 14 (D 810) and No. 15 (D 887), edited by Aderhold (1989). Critical Report by Aderhold (1989).
6. String Trios D 111A (incomplete), 471 (incomplete) and D 581 (two versions), edited by Aderhold (1981). Critical Report by Aderhold (1983).
7. Piano Trio No. 1 (D 898), Piano Trio No. 2 (D 929), Trout Quintet (D 667) and other works for piano and several instruments (Piano Trio, D 28, and Notturno, D 897), edited by Feil (1975). Critical Report by Bauer and Feil (1986).
8. Violin Sonatas Op. 137 (D 384–385 and 408), Violin Sonata (D 574), Arpeggione Sonata (D 821), Rondo (D 895), Fantasy (D 934) and other works for piano and one instrument (D 802), edited by Helmut Wirth (1970). Critical Report by Aderhold (1982).
9. Dances for several instruments: D 2D, 2F, 86, 89, 354, 355, 370, 374, 378, etc., edited by Finke-Hecklinger and Aderhold (1991). Critical Report by Aderhold (2012).

=== Series VII: Piano Music ===
Series VII: Piano Music (Klaviermusik), 5 + 7 volumes:

1. Works for Piano Four Hands:
  1. Sonata, D 617, etc., edited by Litschauer (2007). Critical Report by Litschauer (2012).
  2. Sonata, D 812, etc., edited by Landon (1978). Critical Report by Landon (1978).
  3. Fantasia, D 940, etc., edited by Litschauer and Aderhold (2011). Critical Report by Litschauer and Aderhold (2012).
  4. Marches and dances, including Trois Marches Militaires (D 733), edited by Landon (1972). Critical Report by Landon (1975).
  5. Overtures, including Schubert's arrangement of his Alfonso und Estrella Overture (D 773), edited by Litschauer (1984). Critical Report by Litschauer (1989).
2. Works for Piano Two Hands:
  1. Sonatas No. 1 (D 157), No. 2 (D 279), No. 3 (D 459), No. 4 (D 537), No. 5 (D 557), No. 6 (D 566), No. 7 (D 568, two versions: in D♭ major and in E♭ major), No. 8 (D 570) and No. 9 (D 575), and other movements (D 154, 309A and 571), edited by Litschauer (2000). Critical Report by Litschauer (2005).
  2. Sonatas No. 10 (D 625), No. 11 (D 664), No. 12 (D 784), No. 13 (D 840), No. 14 (D 845) and No. 15 (D 850), and other movements (D 613, 505, 655 and 769A), edited by Litschauer (2003). Critical Report by Litschauer (2004).
  3. Sonatas No. 16 (D 894) and Nos. 17–19 (D 958–960), edited by Litschauer (1996). Critical Report by Litschauer (2004).
  4. Various piano pieces including D 277A, 346, 459A and 506, edited by David Goldberger (1988). Critical Report by Goldberger (1991).
  5. Wanderer Fantasy (D 760), Six moments musicaux (D 780), Impromptus (D 899 and 935), Klavierstücke (D 946), etc., edited by Landon and Dürr (1984). Critical Report by Dürr based on Landon's preparations (1988).
  6. Dances, including some of the Valses Sentimentales, D 779, edited by Litschauer (1989). Critical Report by Litschauer (2014).
  7. Dances:
    1. Second volume of dances, including Valses Sentimentales (D 779) and Valses Nobles (D 969), edited by Litschauer (1990). Critical Report by Litschauer (2007).
    2. Register of melodies by Litschauer and Walter Deutsch (1992).

=== Series VIII: Supplement ===
Series VIII: Supplement, 10 volumes:

1. Vol. a: Arrangements (Bearbeitungen), and Vol. b: Doubtful works (Incerta).
2. Schubert's studies, including composition exercises D 16–17, 25–25C, 33–35, 37A, 965B, etc., edited by Alfred Mann (1986).
3. Later additions (Nachträge).
4. German updated version of the Deutsch Catalogue, edited by Aderhold (1978).
5. Schubert: Die Dokumente seines Lebens, edited by O. E. Deutsch (1964).
6. Schubert und seine Welt in zeitgenössischen Bildern.
7. Franz Schuberts Autographe.
8. Franz Schuberts Werke in Abschriften: Liederalben und Sammlungen, edited by Dürr (1975).
9. Franz Schuberts Werke in Erst- und Frühdrucken, edited by Michael Raab (2015: two volumes).
10. Register.

== Reception ==
Graham Johnson, having become acquainted with the New Schubert Edition from around 1975, describes the way Dürr presented the Lieder in the fourth series as "rethinking Schubert". The Schubertiade Hohenems of 2015 was a celebration of the 50th anniversary of the start of the NSE. The event, held from the first to the third of May, attracted some press attention for the NSE. On the occasion, the Deutsche Schubert-Gesellschaft congratulated the NSE and the International Schubert Society. In 2020, Thomas Seedorf wrote an article about the NSE in the yearbook of the Gesellschaft für Musikgeschichte in Baden-Württemberg.

== Sources ==
- Buschmeier, Gabriele, ed. (2011). "Franz Schubert, Neue Ausgabe sämtlicher Werke". Musikwissenschaftliche Editionen: Jahresbericht 2010 (PDF) (in German). Union of German Academies of Sciences and Humanities. pp. 35–40 – via AdW Mainz.
- Buschmeier, Gabriele, ed. (2016). "Franz Schubert: Neue Ausgabe sämtlicher Werke". Musikwissenschaftliche Editionen: Jahresbericht 2015 (PDF) (in German). Union of German Academies of Sciences and Humanities. pp. 36–40 – via AdW Mainz.
- Deutsch, Otto Erich (1978). Aderhold, Werner (ed.). Franz Schubert: Thematisches Verzeichnis seiner Werke in chronologischer Folge [Franz Schubert: Thematical catalogue of his works in chronological order]. New Schubert Edition (in German). Vol. VIII/4. Dürr, Walther, Feil, Arnold, Landon, Christa. Bärenreiter. ISBN 9783761805718. ISMN 9790006305148. BVK 571.
- Johnson, Graham (2016). "23. 'Die Wegweiser'—Signposts on an Accompanist's Journey to Scholarship: Homage to Walther Dürr". In Byrne Bodley, Lorraine; Horton, Julian (eds.). Rethinking Schubert. Oxford University Press. pp. 485–495. ISBN 9780190200107.
