= Gabriele Buschmeier =

German musicologist (1955–2020)

- Born: 13 March 1955; Schloß Neuhaus, Paderborn, North Rhine-Westphalia, West Germany
- Died: 14 July 2020 (aged 65); Germany
- Occupation: Musicologist

Gabriele Buschmeier (13 March 1955 – 14 July 2020) was a German musicologist. From 2012 until her death in 2020, she was Vice President of the Verwertungsgesellschaft Musikedition.

== Career ==
Buschmeier studied German, history, and musicology at universities in Cologne and Paris. She completed a doctoral degree at the University of Mainz with a thesis, Die Entwicklung von Arie und Szene in der französischen Oper von Gluck bis Spontini, which studied the evolution of solo songs in European opera. The revised version of her thesis, which was published in 1991, was "warmly recommended" by Jesse Rosenberg, although with criticism for the choices and reliability of her sources.

From 1994 onwards, she worked as a senior consultant for the coordination of musicological editions at the Academy of Sciences and Literature in Mainz.

Buschmeier died on 14 July 2020, aged 65.
