= Nacht und Träume =

Lied for voice and piano by Franz Schubert

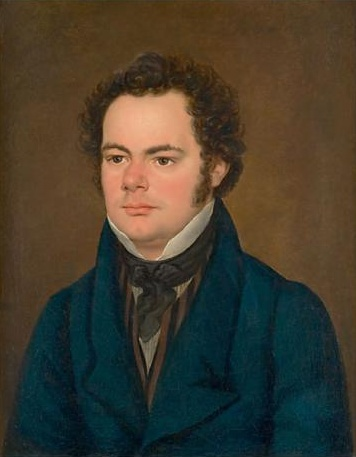
Portrait of Franz Schubert by Franz Eybl (1827)

Nacht und Träume (Night and Dreams) is a lied for voice and piano by Franz Schubert, from a text by Matthäus von Collin, and published in 1825. In Otto Erich Deutsch's catalogue of Schubert's works, it is D. 827.

The song, a meditation on night and dreams, is marked "Sehr langsam" (very slowly) and is in the key of B major (with a modulation to the flattened submediant, G major, in the middle). There is a single dynamic indication, "pianissimo" (very quietly), which does not change throughout the song. The piano plays broken chords in semiquavers for the song's duration in a manner similar to bar five (the bar in which the voice enters), for example:

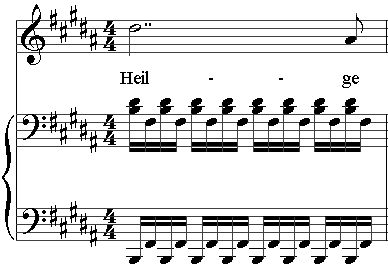

A typical performance will last around three to four minutes.

A version in the Spaun family collection has the different tempo marking "Langsam, Sempre legato" (Slow, Always legato).

The original publication erroneously attributed the text to Friedrich Schiller.

"Nacht und Träume" is one of several Schubert songs that Max Reger arranged for voice and orchestra. The last seven bars of the original version feature in Samuel Beckett's television play of the same name (see Nacht und Träume (play)).

== Song text ==
Heil’ge Nacht, du sinkest nieder;

Nieder wallen auch die Träume

Wie dein Mondlicht durch die Räume,

Durch der Menschen stille Brust.

Die belauschen sie mit Lust;

Rufen, wenn der Tag erwacht:

Kehre wieder, heil’ge Nacht!

Holde Träume, kehret wieder!
