= Franz Schubert's Works =

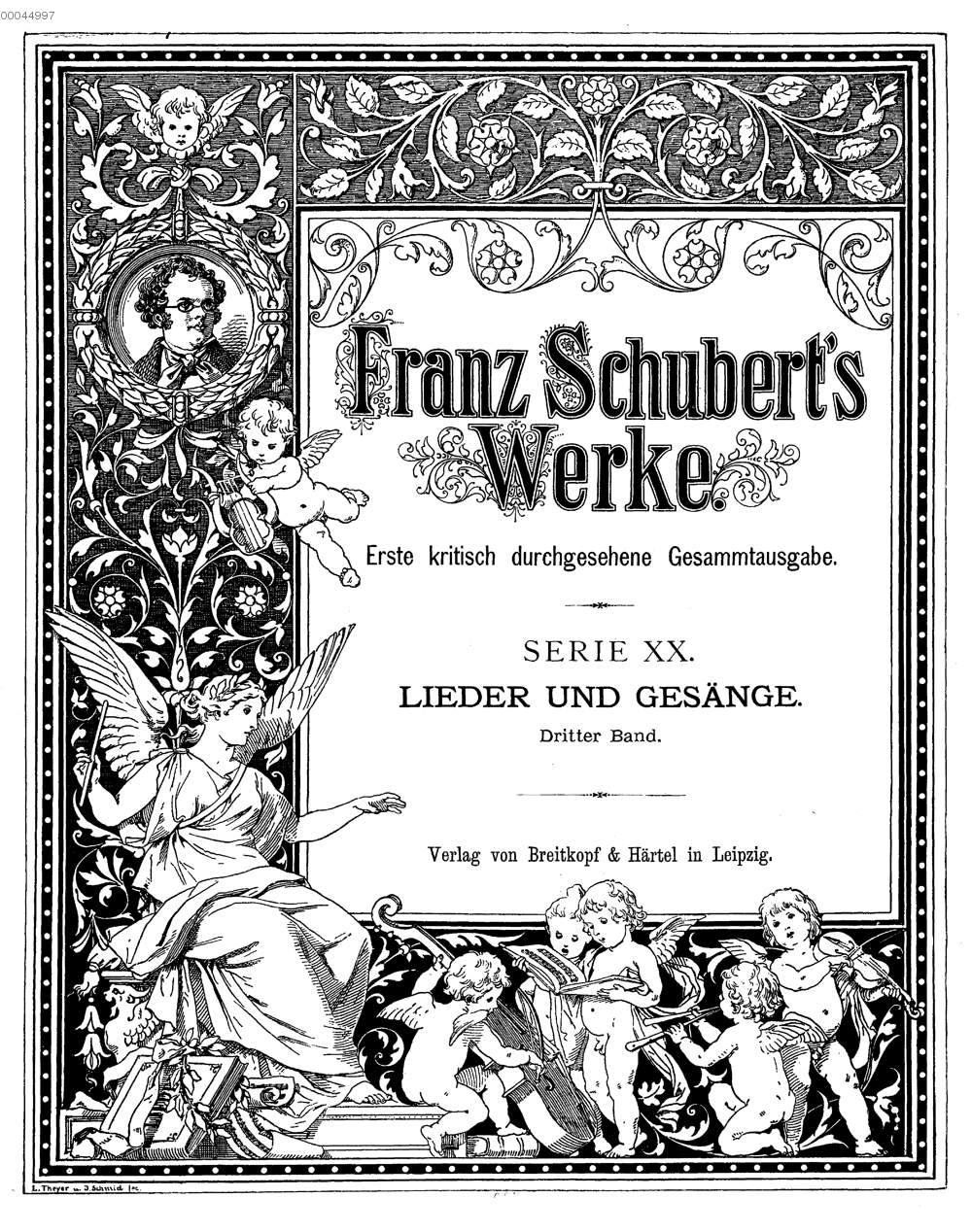
Frontispiece of Series XX, volume 3 of Franz Schubert's Werke

Franz Schubert's Works: Complete and Authoritative Edition (German: Franz Schubert's Werke: Kritisch durchgesehene Gesammtausgabe), also known as the Collected Edition, is a late 19th-century publication of Franz Schubert's compositions. The publication is also known as the Alte Gesamt-Ausgabe ("the former complete edition"), abbreviated as AGA, for instance in the 1978 edition of the Deutsch catalogue, in order to distinguish it from the New Schubert Edition.

== Publication ==
The twenty-two series (some in several volumes) were published from 1884 to 1897 by Breitkopf & Härtel. Eusebius Mandyczewski was one of the main editors. From 1965 Dover Publications started to reprint this edition, and later it was made available at the IMSLP website.

== Content ==
=== I. Symphonien (Nos. 1-8) ===
Editor: Johannes Brahms. Issued 1884. Two volumes (Symphonies 1–3; Symphonies 4–6/8–9). Reprinted: Dover Publications, 1978.

=== II. Overtüren und Andere Orchesterwerke ===
Editor: Johann Nepomuk Fuchs. Issued 1886. Partially reprinted (Nos.1-7) as Overtures "In the Italian style" and Other Works by Dover Publications, 2002.

=== III. Oktette (Nos. 1-3) ===
Editor: Eusebius Mandyczewski, Issued 1889.

=== IV. Streichquintett ===
Editor: Eusebius Mandyczewski. Issued 1889.

=== V. Streichquartette (Nos. 1-15) ===
Editors: Joseph Hellmesberger, Eusebius Mandyczewski. Issued 1890.

=== VI. Trio für Streichinstrumente ===
Editor: Eusebius Mandyczewski, 1892.

=== VII. Trios, Quartets and Quintets with Piano ===
Editor: Ignaz Brüll, 1886. Two volumes.

=== VIII. Pianoforte und Ein Instrument, Partitur und Stimmen ===
Editor: Ignaz Brüll, 1886.

=== IX. Pianoforte zu vier Händen (F.S. 61-92) ===
Editor: Anton Door, 1888. Three volumes.

=== X. Sonaten für Pianoforte ===
Editor: Julius Epstein. Issued 1888

=== XI. Fantasie, Impromptus und andere Stücke für Pianoforte (Nos. 1-16) ===
Editor: Julius Epstein, 1 888.

=== XII. Tänze für Pianoforte (Nos. 1-31) ===
Editor: Julius Epstein, 1889.

=== XIII. Messen (Nos. 1-7) ===
Editor: Eusebius Mandyczewski, 1887. Two volumes: Mass 1–4, and Mass 5–6 with the Deutsche Messe.

=== XIV. Kleinere Kirchenmusikwerke (Nos. 1-22) ===
Editor: Eusebius Mandyczewski; Issued 1888.

=== XV. Dramatische Musik ===
Editor: Johann Nepomuk Fuchs, 1893. Seven volumes.

=== XVI. Werke für Männerchor (Nos. 1-46) ===
Editor: Eusebius Mandyczewski. Issued 1891.

=== XVII. Werke für gemischten Chor (Nos. 1-19) ===
Editors: Josef Gänsbacher, Eusebius Mandyczewski. Issued 1892.

=== XVIII. Werke für Drei und mehr Frauenstimmen mit Pianoforte-Begleitung (Nos. 1-6) ===
Editors: Josef Gänsbacher, Eusebius Mandyczewski, 1891.

=== XIX. Kleine Gesangswerke (Nos. 1-36) ===
Editors: Josef Gänsbacher, Eusebius Mandyczewski, 1892.

=== XX. Sämtliche einstimmige Lieder und Gesänge ===
Editor: Eusebius Mandyczewski, 1894–1895. Ten volumes.

=== XXI. Supplement: Instrumentalmusik; Gesangsmusik ===
Editor: Eusebius Mandyczewski, 349p., 1897.

- Volume 1–3: Instrumentalmusik.
- Volume 4: Gesangsmusik

=== XXII. Revisionsbericht ===
Twelve volumes.

== Sources ==
- Otto Erich Deutsch in collaboration with Donald R. Wakeling. The Schubert Thematic Catalogue. W. W. Norton, 1951. Reprint by Dover Publications, 1995. ISBN 0486286851 ISBN 9780486286853
- (in German) Otto Erich Deutsch, with revisions by Werner Aderhold and others. Franz Schubert, thematisches Verzeichnis seiner Werke in chronologischer Folge (New Schubert Edition Series VIII Supplement, Volume 4). Kassel: Bärenreiter, 1978. ISMN 9790006305148 — ISBN 9783761805718
