= Werner Aderhold =

German musicologist (1937–2021)

Werner Aderhold (4 November 1937 – 15 February 2021) was a German musicologist.

== Life ==
Born in Dortmund, Aderhold was a long-time collaborator of the New Schubert Edition at the Eberhard Karls University of Tübingen. Initially, he contributed to the revised new edition of the Deutsch-Verzeichniss in German (1978). Later, he primarily edited Schubert's instrumental works, including string quartets as well as the great symphonies in B minor and C major.

Aderhold also compiled a series of editions for the Carus-Verlag.

== Publications ==
- (as co-editor): Otto Erich Deutsch, Franz Schubert. Thematisches Verzeichnis seiner Werke in chronologischer Folge. New edition in German (together with Arnold Feil, Walther Dürr), Kassel 1978
- (as co-editor) with Walther Dürr and Walburga Litschauer: Franz Schubert. Jahre der Krise 1818–1823. Arnold Feil on his 60th birthday (Kongreßbericht Kassel 1982), Kassel 1985.
