= Arnold Feil =

German musicologist (1925–2019)

Arnold Feil (2 October 1925 – 30 March 2019) was a German musicologist and academic scholar.

== Life ==
Feil was born in Mannheim, but grew up in Ludwigshafen am Rhein. He studied music (piano and conducting) at the Hochschule für Musik und Darstellende Kunst Mannheim and the Hochschule für Musik und Darstellende Kunst Mannheim as well as musicology, Latin philology of the Middle Ages, history (Middle Ages), philosophy and history of art at Ruprecht-Karls-Universität Heidelberg, which he completed with a doctorate in 1954. From 1954 to 1958, he worked as a music commissioner at the cultural office of the city of Ludwigshafen am Rhein. From 1959 to 1982, he was a lecturer for musicology at the University of Stuttgart; at the same time he was a lecturer for musicology at the Fachhochschule für Bibliothekswesen Stuttgart.

He habilitated at the Eberhard Karls University of Tübingen in 1965 and was an associate professor of musicology there from 1972. After serving as professor of music history at the Hochschule für Musik, Theater und Medien Hannover in 1977 and 1978, he was professor of musicology over again in Tübingen from 1979 to 1988.

In 1965, he was one of the founders of the International Franz Schubert Society, which published the New Schubert Edition, in which Feil played a major role until his retirement.

On the occasion of Feil's 90th birthday, the University of Tübingen hosted a ceremony on 13 October 2015 with greetings from Jürgen Leonhardt and Thomas Schipperges. The keynote speech entitled "Arnold Feil: 60 Years of Music Research" was given by Walther Dürr, and musical contributions were made by Jörg Büchler, Andreas Flad and Naomi Kautt.

Feil died in Tübingen at the age of 93.

== Publications ==
=== Books ===
- Satztechnische Fragen in den Kompositionslehren von Friedrich Erhard Niedt, Joseph Riepel and Heinrich Christoph Koch, Diss. Heidelberg 1955.
- Studien zu Schuberts Rhythmik, Munich 1966, 2nd edition. Hildesheim 1997 (Habilitationsschrift).
- Franz Schubert. Die schöne Müllerin, Winterreise, Stuttgart 1975, 2nd edition 1996.
- Edited together with Werner Aderhold, Walther Dürr and Christa Landon: Otto Erich Deutsch. Franz Schubert. Thematisches Verzeichnis seiner Werke in chronologischer Folge, Kassel 1978.
- with Walther Dürr: Reclams Musikführer Franz Schubert, Stuttgart 1991.
- Metzler Musik Chronik vom frühen Mittelalter bis zur Gegenwart, Stuttgart and Weimar 1993, 2nd, expanded edition 2005..
- Über Musik als Wirklichkeit. Ausgewählte Aufsätze und Vorträge, edited by Jörg Büchler, Wilhelmshaven 2019 (Taschenbücher zur Musikwissenschaft Bd. 171).

=== Editions ===
- Franz Schubert. Neue Ausgabe sämtlicher Werke, published by the Internationalen Schubert-Gesellschaft:
  - together with Christa Landon: Bd. V/1: Sinfonien Nr. 1-3, Kassel 1967.
  - Bd. VI/1: Oktette und Nonett, Kassel 1969.
  - Bd. VI/7: Werke für Klavier und mehrere Instrumente, Kassel 1975.
  - together with Douglas Woodfull-Harris: Sinfonien Nr. 4-6, Kassel 1999.

=== Articles ===
- Mozarts Duett "Bei Männern, welche Liebe fühlen". Periodisch-metrische Fragen, in Festschrift Walter Gerstenberg zum 60. Geburtstag, edited by Georg von Dadelsen and Andreas Holschneider, Wolfenbüttel und Zürich 1964, pp. 45–54
- Volksmusik und Trivialmusik. Bemerkungen eines Historikers zu ihrer Trennung, in Die Musikforschung 26 (1973), pp. 159–166.
- Zur Genesis der Gattung Lied, wie sie Franz Schubert definiert hat, in Muzikološki zbornik 11 (1975), pp. 40–53.
- Über Musik als Wirklichkeit, in Festschrift Georg von Dadelsen zum 60. Geburtstag, edited by Thomas Kohlhase and Volker Scherliess, Neuhausen-Stuttgart 1978, pp. 113–129.
- Die Musikkultur des Mittelmeerbeckens und die abendländische Polyphonie, in Report of the Twelfth Congress (IGMW) Berkeley 1977, Kassel 1981, pp. 402–405.
- Goethes und Schuberts Erlkönig, in Festschrift Rudolf Bockholdt zum 60. Geburtstag, edited by Norbert Dubowy and Sären Meyer-Eller, Pfaffenhofen 1990, pp. 339–351.
- Zum Rhythmus der Wiener Klassiker, in Internationaler Musikwissenschaftlicher Kongreß zum Mozartjahr 1991 Baden-Wien. Bericht, vol. 1, edited by Ingrid Fuchs, Tutzing 1993, pp. 241–254.
- Überlegungen zur Instrumentalmusik und zur instrumentalen Komposition in der älteren abendländischen Musikgeschichte, in Traditionen – Neuansätze. Für Anna Amalie Abert (1906-1996), edited by Hortschansky, Tutzing 1997, pp. 265–272.
