= Peter Gülke =

German conductor and musicologist (1934–2026)

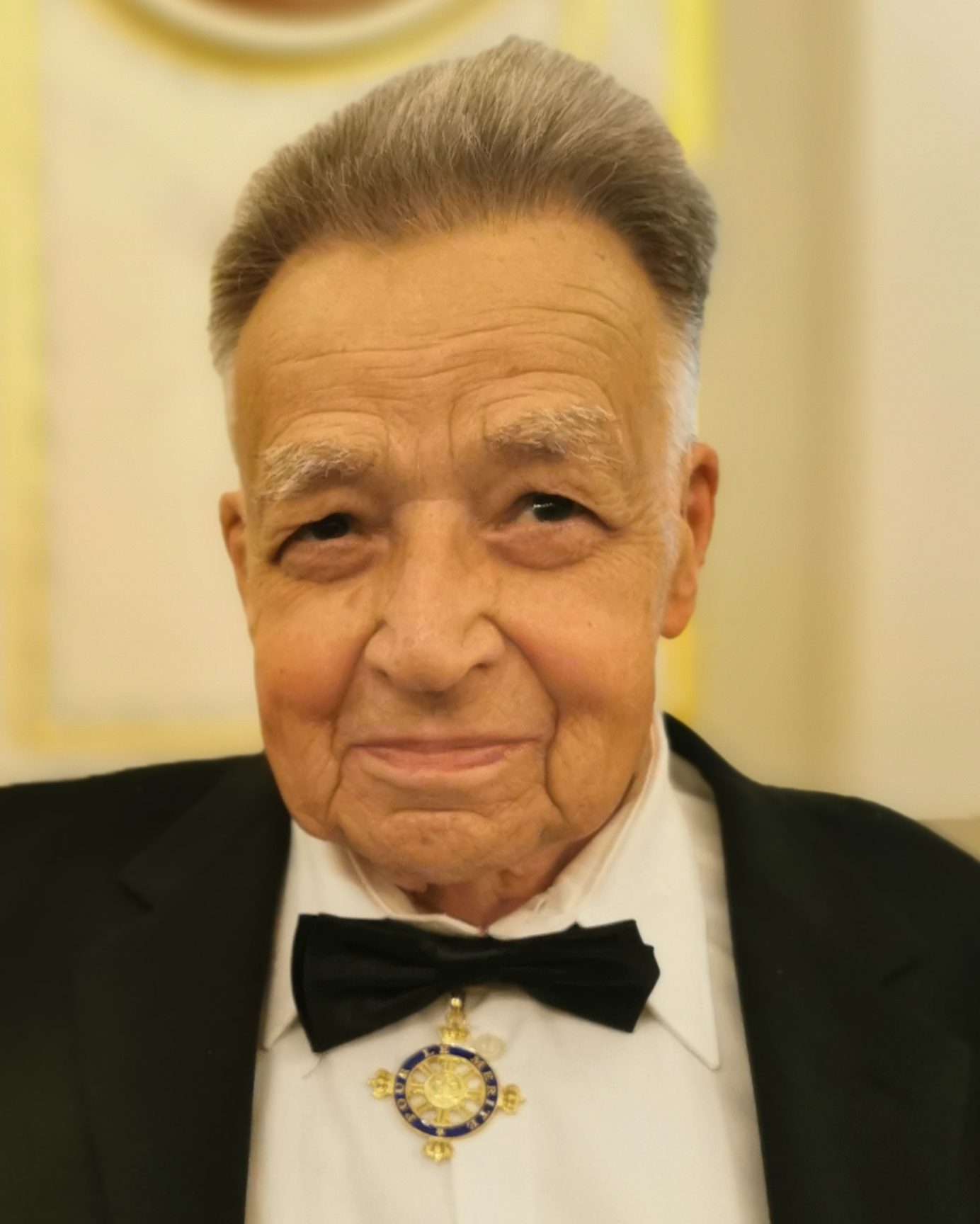
- Gülke in 2025 with the Pour le Mérite order
- Born: 29 April 1934; Weimar, Germany
- Died: 26 April 2026 (aged 91); Jena, Germany
- Education: Musikhochschule Weimar; Technische Universität Berlin
- Occupations: Conductor; Musicologist
- Organizations: Hochschule für Musik Freiburg; University of Basel; Sächsische Akademie der Künste; Brandenburger Symphoniker
- Awards: Ernst von Siemens Music Prize; Sigmund Freud Prize

Peter Ludwig Gülke (29 April 1934 – 26 April 2026) was a German conductor and musicologist.

== Life and career ==
Born in Weimar on 29 April 1934, Gülke studied cello and musicology at the Hochschule für Musik Franz Liszt, Weimar. He completed his doctorate in philosophy in Leipzig in 1958, followed in 1985 by his professorial thesis at Technische Universität Berlin. In 1976 he became conductor at the Sächsische Staatsoper Dresden and in 1981 he was appointed Principal Conductor in Weimar. From 1986 to 1996 he was Principal Conductor in the City of Wuppertal. From 1996 to 2001 he was a professor of conducting at the Hochschule für Musik Freiburg and from 1999 to 2002 professor of musicology at the University of Basel. From 2011 to 2014 he was President of the Sächsische Akademie der Künste. Gülke was the chief conductor of the Brandenburger Symphoniker from 2015 to 2020.

Gülke died in Jena on 26 April 2026, at the age of 91.

== Awards ==
- 1994 Sigmund Freud Prize of the Akademie für Sprache und Dichtung
- 1998 Karl-Vossler-Preis
- 2004 Honorary doctorate University of Bern
- 2007 Honorary doctorate Hochschule für Musik Carl Maria von Weber in Dresden
- 2009 Honorary doctorate Hochschule für Musik Franz Liszt, Weimar
- 2014 Ernst von Siemens Music Prize
- 2016 Bavarian Maximilian Order for Science and Art
- 2017 Order of Merit of the Federal Republic of Germany
- 2022 Pour le Mérite

== Publications ==
- Das Schriftbild der mehrstimmigen Musik. Leipzig 1972.
- Musik des Mittelalters und der Renaissance. Leipzig 1973.
- Mönche, Bürger, Minnesänger. Musik in der Gesellschaft des europäischen Mittelalters. Leipzig 1975.
- Rousseau und die Musik. Wilhelmshaven 1984.
- Brahms, Bruckner. Zwei Studien. Kassel and Basel 1989.
- Schubert und seine Zeit. Laaber 1991.
- Fluchtpunkt Musik. Reflexionen eines Dirigenten zwischen Ost und West. Stuttgart and Weimar 1994.
- Triumph der neuen Tonkunst. Mozarts letzte Sinfonien und ihr Umfeld. Stuttgart and Weimar 1998; ISBN 978-3-476-01640-9
- „… immer das Ganze vor Augen“. Studien zu Beethoven. Stuttgart 2000.
- Die Sprache der Musik. Essays zur Musik von Bach bis Holliger. Stuttgart and Kassel 2001. ISBN 978-3-7618-2025-4 or ISBN 978-3-476-01862-5
- Guillaume Du Fay. Die Musik des 15. Jahrhunderts. Stuttgart 2003, ISBN 978-3-476-01883-0
- Auftakte-Nachspiele. Kassel, Stuttgart and Weimar 2006. ISBN 978-3-476-02122-9
- Robert Schumann. Glück und Elend der Romantik, Zsolnay Verlag, Munich 2010 ISBN 978-3-552-05492-9
- Gegen den Strom und mit der Zeit. Sächsische Akad. der Künste, Dresden 2011, ISBN 978-3-934367-19-7
- Von Bach bis Beethoven. Kassel 2014. ISBN 978-3-7618-2348-4
- Musik und Abschied. Kassel, Stuttgart and Weimar 2015. ISBN 978-3-7618-2401-6
- Felix Mendelssohn Bartholdy. Stuttgart 2017, ISBN 978-3-476-04540-9
- Dirigenten. Hildesheim 2017, ISBN 978-3-487-08589-0
