= Ignaz Brüll =

Austrian musician

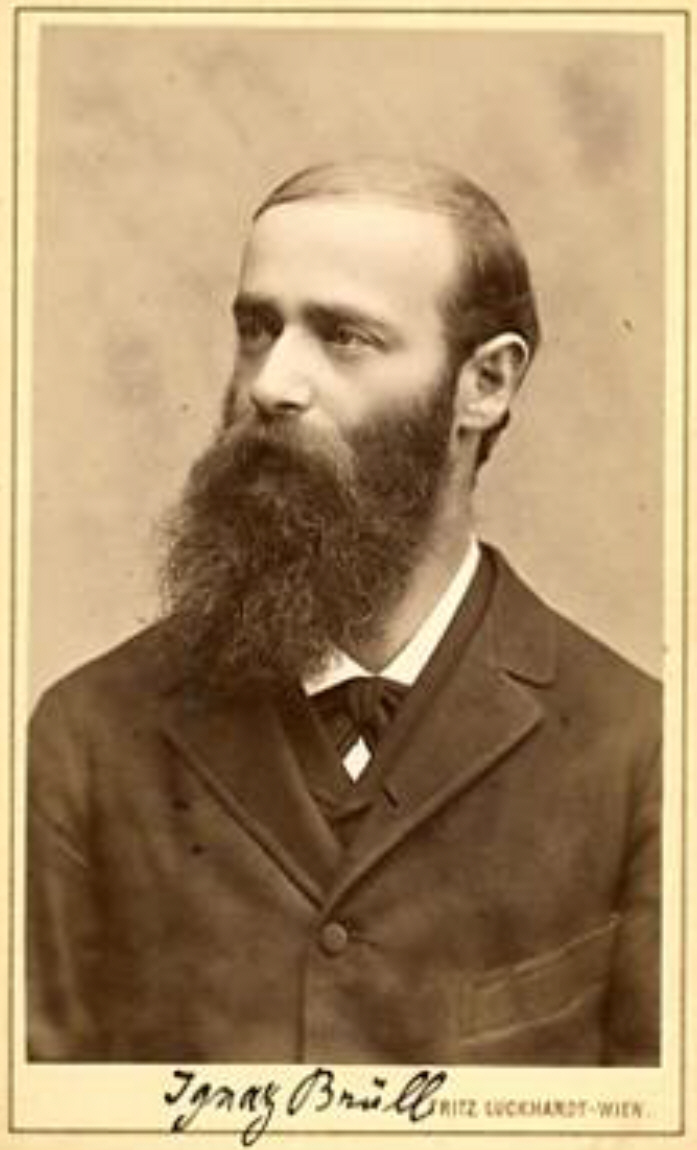
Ignaz Brüll

Ignaz Brüll (7 November 1846 – 17 September 1907) was a pianist and composer from Austria-Hungary. Born in Moravia, he lived and worked in Vienna.

His operatic compositions included Das goldene Kreuz (The Golden Cross), which became a repertory work for several decades after its first production in 1875, but eventually fell into neglect after being banned by the Nazis because of Brüll's Jewish origins. He also wrote a small corpus of finely crafted works for the concert hall and recitals. Brüll's compositional style was lively but unabashedly conservative, in the vein of Mendelssohn and Schumann.

Brüll was also highly regarded as a sensitive concert pianist. Johannes Brahms regularly wanted Brüll to be his partner in private performances of four-hand piano duet arrangements of his latest works. Indeed, Brüll was a prominent member of Brahms's circle of musical and literary friends, many of whom he and his wife frequently entertained.

In recent years, Brüll's concert music has been revived on CD, and well-received recordings are available of his piano concertos, among other non-vocal works.

In 1872 he was appointed professor at the Horak Institute in Vienna.

== Biography ==
=== Early years ===
Brüll was born in Prostějov (Proßnitz) in Moravia, the eldest son of Katharina Schreiber and Siegmund Brüll. His parents were prosperous Jewish merchants and keen social musicians; his mother played piano and his father (who was closely related to the Talmudic scholar Nehemiah Brüll) sang baritone. In 1848 the family relocated their business to Vienna, where Brüll lived and worked for the rest of his life.

Brüll started learning piano from his mother around the age of eight and he quickly showed talent. Despite being the heir to the family business, his promise at the keyboard encouraged his parents to provide him with a serious musical training. By the age of ten, he was taking piano lessons from Julius Epstein, a professor at the Vienna Conservatory and friend of Brahms. A year later, in 1857, he began studying composition with Johann Rufinatscha; instrument instruction followed with Felix Otto Dessoff.

In 1860, while aged fourteen, Brüll started writing his Piano Concerto No. 1, which received its first public performance the following year in Vienna with Epstein as soloist. (Note: Epstein volunteered to premiere the work despite his usual reluctance to perform concertos. This youthful work became a staple of Brüll's own pianistic repertoire: he played it in Vienna (1869), Berlin (1871) and England (Liverpool, Manchester and London, 1881). In America, the concerto was popularized by Richard Hoffman, who gave the U.S. premiere in 1880.) Further encouragement to pursue a musical career came with endorsement from the distinguished pianist-composer Anton Rubinstein.

=== Success and Das goldene Kreuz ===
Brüll scored another success with his Serenade No. 1 for Orchestra, which was premiered in Stuttgart in 1864. By now, Brüll was 18 years old and had just finished composing his first opera score, Die Bettler von Samarkand (The Beggars of Samarkand). (Note: Whereas the Brüll Rediscovery Project lists the year of composition as 1867, Brüll's biographer, Hartmut Wecker, states that the opera was written in 1864, when Brüll first submitted it to the Court Theater in Stuttgart, before going there two years later in an abortive attempt to supervise the planned production. (Some tertiary sources claim that the opera was produced in Vienna in 1864.)) Unfortunately, plans for a production at the Court Theatre in Stuttgart in 1866 failed to materialize, and the work was apparently never played.

By contrast, Brüll's second opera, Das goldene Kreuz (The Golden Cross), was by far his most successful: it held a place in the repertory for several decades and brought its composer into the public eye almost overnight. At its premiere in Berlin in December 1875, Brüll was personally complimented by the emperor, Wilhelm I. The opera, with a libretto by Salomon Hermann Mosenthal based on a story by Mélesville, involves an emotional drama of mistaken identities during the Napoleonic wars.

In parallel, Brüll had also been pursuing a career as a concert pianist, playing as a popular soloist and recitalist throughout the German speaking countries. The London premiere of Das goldene Kreuz, in an 1878 production by the Carl Rosa Opera Company, coincided with the first of two extensive concert tours of England, (Note: His other English tour was in 1881, when he played at eight concerts. The 1878 tour comprised at least 20 concerts. The Carl Rosa production of Das goldene Kreuz, in which Lilli Lehmann played the leading role, was not a remarkable success.) during which he was able to play his Piano Concerto No. 2 (another youthful work, written in 1868) and arrange performances of some of his other pieces. Brüll also toured with George Henschel.

=== The Brahms circle and later years ===
In 1882, Brüll married Marie Schosberg, a banker's daughter who became a popular hostess to Viennese musical and artistic society. Brüll now shifted his attention towards composition, reduced the number of concert engagements, and permanently gave up touring. He also found himself playing host to Johannes Brahms's circle of friends, including the powerful music critic Eduard Hanslick, the musically minded eminent surgeon Theodor Billroth, and composers such as Carl Goldmark, Robert Fuchs, and even Gustav Mahler. (Note: Other composer friends included Eusebius Mandyczewski, Richard Heuberger and Ludwig Rottenberg. Another member of the circle was Brüll's old piano teacher, Julius Epstein (who had accepted Mahler as a pupil in the same year that he started teaching Brüll). Both Brüll's composition teachers were also friends of Brahms. The friendship with Goldmark dated back to his student days.) When Brahms wanted to audition his latest orchestral compositions, as was his habit, to a select group of connoisseurs in four-handed versions for two pianos, Brüll regularly played alongside the senior composer. From 1890, Brüll's new holiday home (the Berghof) in Unterach am Attersee also became a social venue.

Unlike Brahms, Brüll was a man of the theatre, and he went on to compose at least seven more operas, which however did not approach the same level of popular success as Das goldene Kreuz. (Note: According to The Oxford Dictionary of Music, he composed a total of ten operas.) His final opera, the two-act comedy Der Hussar, was well received when it was staged in Vienna in 1898.

Brüll was an honorary British consul at Budapest and was appointed an Honorary Companion of the Order of St Michael and St George in the 1902 Coronation Honours list on 26 June 1902.

== Music ==
Brüll's other operas include: Der Landfriede (Vienna, 1877), Bianca (Dresden, 1879), Königin Mariette (Munich, 1883), Das Steinerne Herz (Prague, 1888), Gringoire (one act, Munich, 1892), and Schach dem König (Munich, 1893). For the ballet, he wrote the orchestral dance-suite Ein Märchen aus der Champagne (1896).

Orchestral concert works by Brüll include the Im Walde and Macbeth overtures, a symphony and three serenades, a violin concerto, and the two piano concertos, as well as three other piano concertante pieces. His chamber and instrumental music includes a suite and three sonatas for piano and violin, a trio, a cello sonata, a sonata for two pianos and various other piano pieces. He also wrote songs and part-songs.

Brüll's compositions were typically romantic, and bore similarity to works by Schumann, Mendelssohn and Brahms.

=== Recordings ===
While a selection of Brüll's concert and recital works is now available on CD, the vocal output has been largely passed by: the few known commercial recordings, by Brüll's Moravian compatriot Leo Slezak and by Emanuel List among others, remain confined to vinyl. (Note: The Brüll Rediscovery Project has compiled a list of known recordings of the composer's music.) The second piano concerto was set down twice on elusive LPs, and in 1999, Hyperion Records released a well-received recording of the two piano concertos and a Konzertstück played by Martin Roscoe with the BBC Scottish Symphony Orchestra under Martyn Brabbins. Brüll's piano sonata has been recorded by Alexandra Oehler for CPO along with some other shorter keyboard pieces.

For the centenary of Brüll's death in 2007, the Cameo Classics record label and the Brüll Rediscovery Project began a recording programme intended to make Brüll's orchestral works known to a wider audience. His Symphony op. 31 and the Serenade No. 1, op. 29 were recorded by the Belarusian State Symphony Orchestra under Marius Stravinsky. Janet Olney recorded a selection of solo piano works by Brüll (CC9030CD). His Piano Sonata No. 3 was recorded in 2010 by Valentina Seferinova, as was his Serenade No. 2, op. 36 for Orchestra (CC9031CD). In 2011 the Musical Director of the Malta Philharmonic Orchestra, Michael Laus, corrected and completed the score of Brüll's Violin Concerto and recorded the complete work with Ilya Hoffman as soloist (due to multiple errors and gaps in both the score and Brüll's original manuscript, only the slow movement had been previously released). The Macbeth overture was also recorded. All the Cameo Classics recording sessions were filmed, and a documentary on the music of Brüll and his fellow German Jewish Romantic era composers is reported to be in preparation.

=== Reputation ===
Brüll's concerts were typically well-received. According to critic August Wilhelm Ambros, his piano concerto was known for its original aspects and beauty. This source also classified him as a first-rate pianist. Brüll was consulted by Johannes Brahms because of his admiration for Brüll's work as a professional composer. Contrary to many other Jewish composers of the time, he did not receive explicit anti-Semitic criticism. This was because he was less known compared to other composers like Gustav Mahler or Alexander Zemlinsky, who were more prominently discussed in the press.

== Media ==
- Scores for Kaila's Piano Performances listed here are available at the imslp.org Category:Brüll,Ignaz web page
- https://imslp.org/wiki/Category:Brüll,_Ignaz

Kaila Rochelle performance of Brüll: Op.71 Piano Suite No.2 mvt 1 Prelude

Kaila Rochelle performance of Brüll: Bretonische Melodien Op.45 No.1 Melodie

Kaila Rochelle performance of Brüll: Bretonische Melodien Op.45 No.2 Ballade

Kaila Rochelle performance of Brüll: Op.53 No.1 Valse-Caprice

Kaila Rochelle performance of Brüll: Op.53 No.2 Melodie_revised 002

Kaila Rochelle performance of Brüll: Mazurka Op.34 No.1

Kaila Rochelle performance of Brüll: Barcarole Op.34 No.2

Kaila Rochelle performance of Brüll: Piano Suite No.1 Op.58 4mvt set complete
