= Walther Dürr =

German musicologist (1932–2018)

Walther Dürr (27 April 1932 – 6 January 2018) was a German musicologist. He is especially known for his research of the work of Franz Schubert. From 1965 to 1997 Dürr was editor of the Neue Schubert-Ausgabe, with particular responsibility for the 14 volumes of lieder.

Born in Berlin, Dürr studied from 1951 musicology and German and Romance studies in Berlin and Tübingen. He gained a PhD in 1956. Further studies and teaching led him to Bologna and back to Tübingen. He also taught at the universities of Stuttgart, Freiburg, and Bern.

Besides his musicology work, he worked as a music critic, editor of numerous magazines, and translator of opera librettos.

Dürr died in Tübingen, at age 85.
