= Piano Sonata in C major, D 613 (Schubert) =

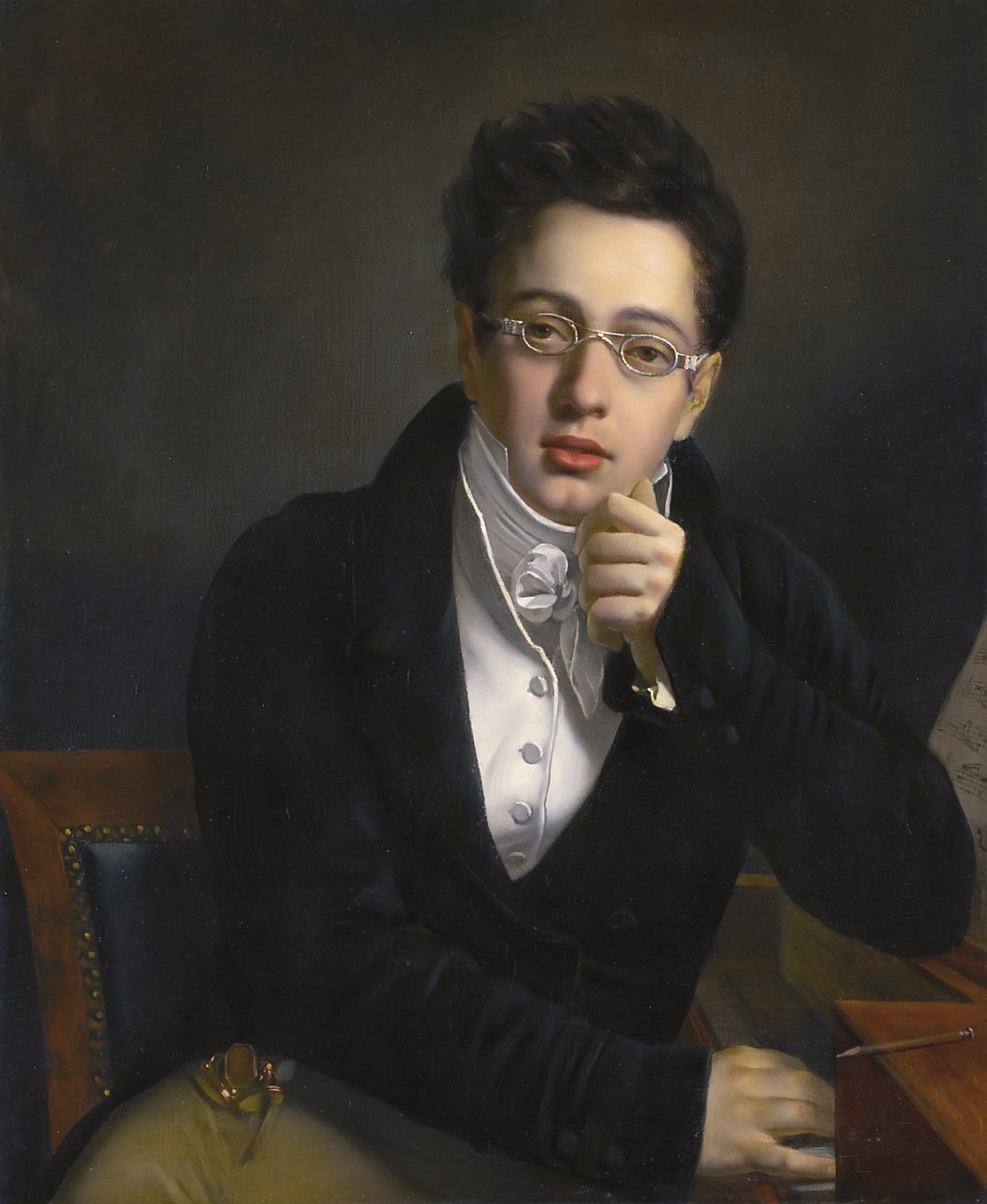
Possible portrait of the young Franz Schubert c. 1814, attributed to Josef Abel

The Piano Sonata in C major D 613 is an unfinished piano sonata written by Franz Schubert in April 1818.

== Movements ==
=== I. Moderato ===
Only a fragment exists, ending after the development with an implied cadence in E major.

=== (II. Adagio, D. 612) ===
According to Martino Tirimo, Schubert's Adagio in E major, D. 612 is most likely the middle movement of this sonata.

=== III. ===
Lacking a tempo indication, this movement is in the style of a siciliana. It is incomplete, and ends at what is presumably the end of the development.

Piano sonatas (2 hands) by Franz Schubert
Preceded by Sonata in B major (D. 575)	21 Sonatas numbering system No. 10	Succeeded by Sonata in F minor (D. 625)
Preceded by Sonata in B major (D. 575)	Wiener Urtext Edition (21 Sonatas); No. 11	Succeeded by Sonata in F minor (D. 625)
Preceded by Sonata in B major (D. 575)	23 Sonatas numbering system No. 12	Succeeded by Sonata in F minor (D. 625)
