= Piano Sonata in E major, D 157 (Schubert) =

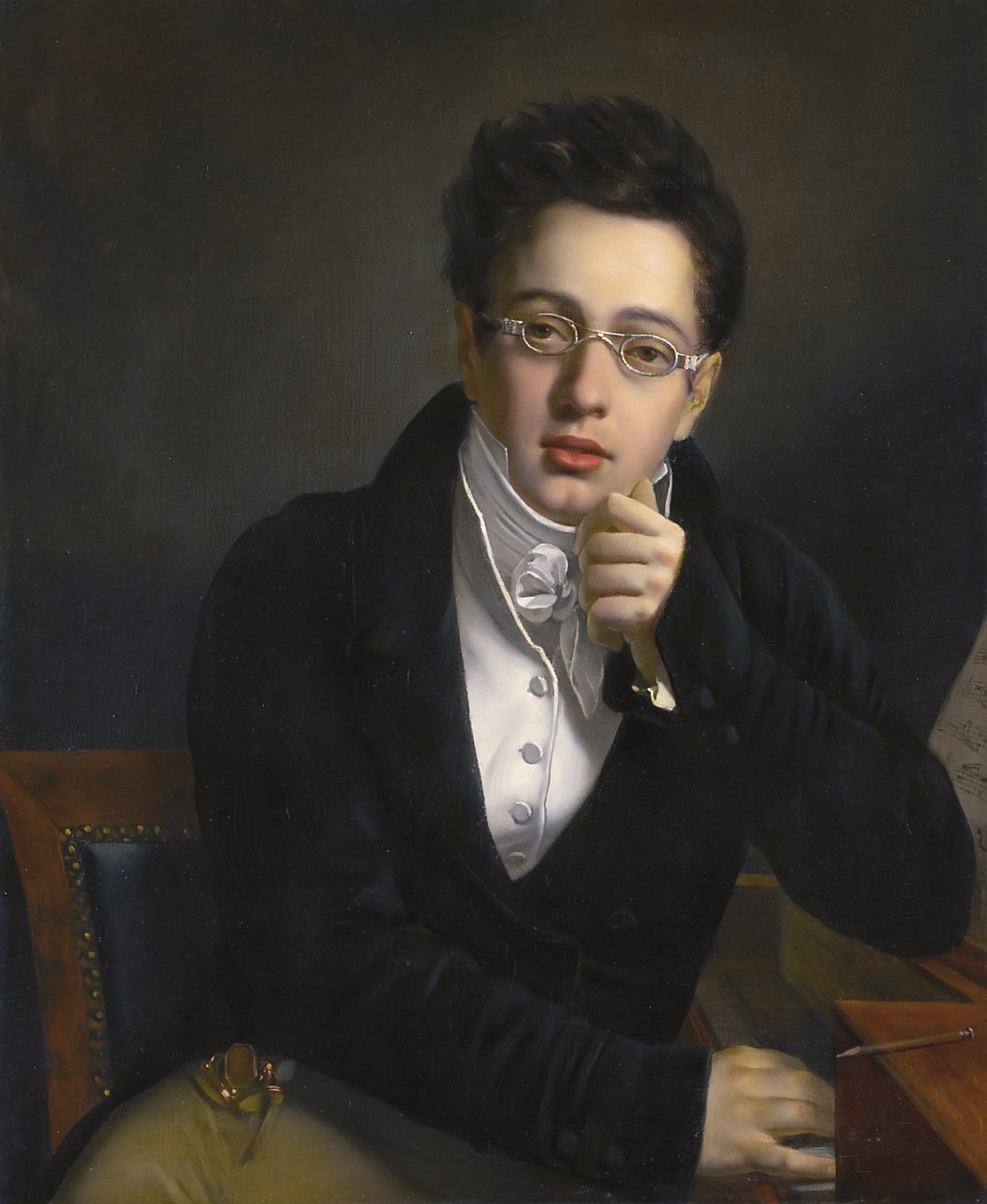
Possible portrait of the young Franz Schubert c. 1814, attributed to Josef Abel

The Piano Sonata in E major, D 157 is a three-movement piano sonata composed by Franz Schubert in February 1815. The Allegro D 154 is an early version of its first movement.

== Extant movements of the sonata D 157 ==
The piano sonata D 157 has three known movements:

1. Allegro ma non troppo (E major)
2. Andante (E minor)
3. Menuetto: Allegro vivace – Trio (a scherzo in B major, with trio in G major)

Some commentators describe the first movement of the sonata as by far the most interesting, as it shows Schubert breaking away from the restrictions on harmonic progressions his teacher Antonio Salieri had imposed for vocal music, and as one of his happiest inspirations, prefiguring his later trade marks, while the remaining two movements are described as somewhat run of the mill. Others see in the first movement rather unconvincing unorthodoxies lacking invention, while the other two movements are more musically satisfying, with reminiscences of Beethoven and some of Schubert's later compositions.

=== I. Allegro ma non troppo ===
The first movement serves as a bright, apt opener to the sonata, introducing both the nature and key of the piece in an imaginative and exciting way. It was composed from 18–21 February 1815.

The theme of the first movement is not especially melodic. Rather, it sets out to explore the key of E major using two types of contrast: chords vs. arpeggios and scales, and legato vs. staccato. After the opening E major chord, there is an ascending, legato arpeggio, which is met by a fast, downward scale, marked staccato. This pattern is repeated in the dominant, submediant, and finally the subdominant chords. All this together makes up the main tune.

The secondary themes all have basically the same elements: the left hand playing legato arpeggiations of chords, while the right hand plays staccato chordal melodies, interspersed with multiple grace notes.

The movement includes the conventional repeat of its exposition section, comprising three out of the total of 8 pages in the movement. There are also a few very long rests in the movement, a couple of which last up to two full measures. Such rests would reappear in his later work, like his last sonatas.

=== II. Andante ===
The second movement is in rondo form, with two episodes. The theme is essentially harmonic. The second occurrence of the theme is, somewhat unusually, simplified instead of embellished, and in this form is quite similar to the opening of Schubert's unfinished seventh symphony in E major. The movement is in siciliana 6/8 rhythm.

=== III. Menuetto: Allegro vivace – Trio ===
The trio has some similarities to that of Schubert's later D major piano sonata, D 850: both trios move in almost constant crotchets and have the same key, sometimes even sharing harmonic progressions.

== Missing fourth movement? ==
Although all three movements of sonata D 157 are complete in Schubert's autograph, the sonata as a whole is believed to be incomplete due to a missing final fourth movement. There is no indication Schubert ever attempted to start composing a fourth movement. There are however indications that the work is to be regarded as incomplete without such additional movement:

- A relatively weak indication is that the last movement is a Minuet and Trio, which was at the time an unusual type of movement to end a sonata with, although not unheard of (one example is Joseph Haydn's C♯ Minor Sonata, Hob:XVI/36). This is the last of three movements, and it would have been a little more usual at the time to write a sonata in four movements, although three-movement sonatas were not too uncommon.
- A more compelling indication of the sonata's incomplete status is the fact that this Minuet and Trio is in the key of B major, not the sonata's tonic key of E major. It would have been extremely unusual at the time to end a sonata in a key other than its tonic, and it is much more likely that Schubert intended to add a fourth movement in the key of E major. However, there are other early instrumental compositions by Schubert that are certainly finished, and do not return to the tonic, for example the string quartet D 18 (two more early string quartets in mixed keys, D 19 and 19A, have been lost).

Others point to the finale-like character of the third movement, so that it can be seen as an effective conclusion of the sonata despite a failure to return to the tonic. It is not known whether Schubert never got around to composing a fourth movement or deliberately abandoned any attempt to write it. It is nevertheless unlikely that Schubert wrote a fourth movement that has since been lost, because several blank pages follow the third movement in the autograph.

== D 154, an unfinished sonata movement ==
D 154, an unfinished Allegro in E major, composed 11 February 1815, and like D 157 titled "Sonate" in the autograph, is usually seen as an early version of the first movement of D 157. D 154 breaks off at the end of the development. Its second theme, several figures and the start of the development section are nearly identical to D 157's first movement.

Others see D 154 and the first movement of D 157 as individual drafts of separate compositions merely sharing some of the material. D 154 is more demanding from a performer than the first movement of D 157, and is also written more orchestrally and adventurously.

== Score ==
There were no publications of this work before the Breitkopf & Härtel complete edition of the end of the 19th century, known as the Alte Gesammtausgabe (AGA).

=== Manuscripts ===
The autograph of D 154 is titled Sonate and has 11 February 1815 as date at the end of the single and incomplete Allegro movement.

The autograph of D 157 has the dates 18 and 21 February 1815 respectively at the beginning and the end of the first movement.

Both manuscripts are in the city library of Vienna, and can be consulted online via the Schubert-Autographs website.

=== First publication: Alte Gesammtausgabe ===
D 157 was first published in 1888 as No. 1 of the Piano Sonatas volume (Series X) of the Kritisch durchgesehene Gesammtausgabe published by Breitkopf & Härtel. The second volume of the Supplement (Series XXI) contained the D 154 fragment.

=== Urtext Editions ===
Two Urtext editions were published in 1997: both Paul Badura-Skoda (Henle) and Martino Tirimo (Wiener Urtext) published the D 154 Allegro in an Appendix of the volume that contained the three extant movements of Schuberts Sonata D 157.

=== Neue Schubert-Ausgabe (NSA) ===
Also in the New Schubert Edition VII/2/1 D 154 is given in an Appendix to the volume that contains Schubert's first sonata D 157.

== Sources ==
- Schubert-Autographs website of Austrian Academy of Sciences (OAW):
  - D 154 Sonate (E-Dur)
  - D 157 Sonate (E-Dur)
- Franz Schubert's Werke: Kritisch durchgesehene Gesammtausgabe (AGA): Leipzig, Breitkopf & Härtel:
  - D 157: Julius Epstein (ed.) Serie 10: Sonaten für Pianoforte — No. 1 (1888).
  - D 154: Eusebius Mandyczewski (ed.) Serie 21: Supplement — Instrumentalmusik, Band 2 — No. 8 (1897).
- Urtext editions:
  - Paul Badura-Skoda (ed.) Franz Schubert: Piano Sonatas — Volume III (Early and Unfinished Sonatas). G. Henle Verlag (1997).
  - Martino Tirimo (ed.) Schubert: The Complete Piano Sonatas — Volume 1 Vienna: Wiener Urtext Edition (1997). ISMN 979-0-50057-223-7 ISBN 978-3-85055-584-5
- Franz Schubert: Neue Ausgabe sämtlicher Werke (NSA): Kassel, Bärenreiter:
  - Otto Erich Deutsch. Series VIII: Supplement — Volume 4: Franz Schubert, thematisches Verzeichnis seiner Werke in chronologischer Folge — pp. 112-114 (1978). ISMN 9790006305148 — ISBN 9783761805718
  - Walburga Litschauer (ed.) Series VII: Piano Music, Part 2: Works for Piano Two Hands — Volume 1: Klaviersonaten I (2000). ISMN 9790006497119
- Newbould, Brian (1999). Schubert: The Music and the Man. University of California Press. pp. 95–6. ISBN 9780520219571.
- Javier Arrebola. The Unfinished Piano Sonatas of Franz Schubert. Helsinki, Sibelius Academy, DocMus Doctoral School. Lucena, Ochando Press ISBN 978-952-5959-34-5 ISBN 978-952-5959-36-9

Piano sonatas (2 hands) by Franz Schubert
AGA, Series 10 (15 sonatas); No. 1	Succeeded by Sonata in C major (D. 279)
21 Sonatas numbering system No. 1	Succeeded by Sonata in C major (D. 279)
23 Sonatas numbering system No. 1	Succeeded by Sonata in C major (D. 279)
