= Scherzos (Schubert) =

Franz Schubert wrote two Scherzos, D 593, for solo piano:

1. B♭ major
2. D♭ major

Schubert, Scherzo D.593 No.1 in B-flat major
Performed by Constantin Stephan

The autograph has been lost, but a manuscript copy made in the 1840s suggests that the pieces were composed in November 1817.

The second scherzo has been suggested as being a possible third movement to Schubert's Piano Sonata in D♭ major, D 567, and its trio is identical to the trio of the minuet of the Piano Sonata in E♭ major (itself being a transposed and revised version of the D 567 sonata).
