= Piano Sonata in C major, D 279 (Schubert) =

Piano sonata composed by Franz Schubert

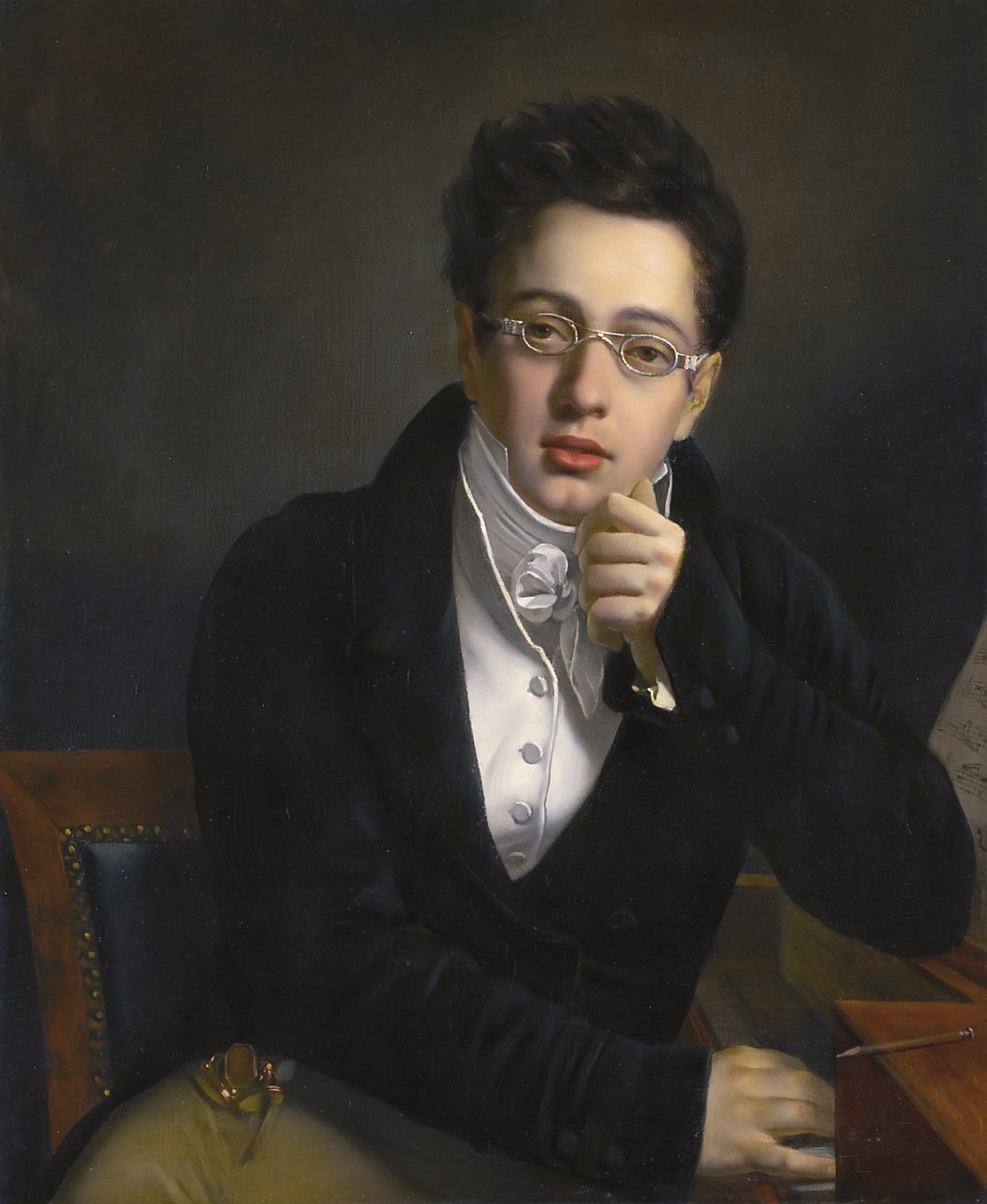
Possible portrait of the young Franz Schubert c. 1814, attributed to Josef Abel

The Piano Sonata in C major, D 279 is a three-movement piano sonata composed by Franz Schubert in September 1815. It is regarded as incomplete for lacking a fourth movement. D. 346, an unfinished Allegretto in C major, has been suggested as its final movement.

== Movements ==
The sonata has three completed movements:

I. Allegro moderato in C major, with the recapitulation in the subdominant key of F major
II. Andante in F major
III. Menuetto (Allegro vivace) – Trio in A minor, with the trio in A major

D. 277A is a slightly different version of the same Minuet, with a different Trio in F major. D. 277A probably predates the D. 279 Sonata.

Since 1928 several scholars, the first being Walter Rehberg, have suggested D. 346 to be the finale of the sonata D. 279:

(IV. Allegretto D. 346): Fragment in C major ending at measure 231, where the second theme ends in F minor
Both Martino Tirimo and Paul Badura-Skoda published a completion of this Allegretto, as fourth movement to D. 279, in 1997.
The time of composition of this Allegretto is uncertain, probably 1815 or 1816.

An abandoned start of a Rondo in C major, D. 309A (mentioned p. 173 in the 1978 version of the Deutsch catalogue however without a catalogue number being assigned to it at the time, so in several publications mentioned as D deest), dated 16 October 1815, is another candidate for what Schubert might have intended as last movement for this sonata.

== Score ==
There were no publications of this work before the Breitkopf & Härtel Alte Gesammtausgabe (AGA) edition of the end of the 19th century.

=== Manuscripts ===
The autograph of D. 279 is titled Sonate I, and has September 1815 indicated as time of composition. The autograph of D. 346 has no date. Both autographs are in the city library of Vienna, and can be consulted online via the Schubert-Autographs website.

The autograph of D. 277A has disappeared, but there is a manuscript copy by Eusebius Mandyczewski. The autograph of the D. 309A fragment has only six bars, and was later completely crossed out by Schubert. This autograph, above the second autograph version of D. 310, is in the Austrian National Library, and has been made available on-line.

=== First publication ===
D. 279 was first published in 1888 as No. 2 of the Piano Sonatas volume (Series X) of the Kritisch durchgesehene Gesammtausgabe. The second volume of the Supplement (Series XXI) contained the D. 346 fragment. D.277A was first published by Otto Erich Deutsch in 1925.

=== Urtext Editions ===
Two Urtext editions were published in 1997: Paul Badura-Skoda (Henle) completes the Sonata in C major D. 279 with the Allegretto D. 346, and gives D. 277A in an appendix. The other publication of the same year is by Martino Tirimo (Wiener Urtext).

=== Neue Schubert-Ausgabe (NSA) ===
The New Schubert Edition has D. 279 in VII/2/1. The Rondo D. 309A fragment is given in an appendix of that publication. D. 277A and D. 346 are contained in VII/2/4

== Performances ==
The work, including the D. 346 finale, takes approximately 20 minutes to perform.

Performances of the sonata with the D. 346 Allegretto as finale include the December 2000 recording played by Tamara Rumiantsev. Bart Berman recorded a completion of the D. 279 sonata.

== Sources ==
- Schubert-Autographs website of Austrian Academy of Sciences (OAW):
  - D 279 Sonate I
  - D 346 Allegretto (Klavierstück) C-Dur
  - D 309A, crossed out first bars of a Rondo in C major, preceding D 310B "Sehnsucht"
- Franz Schubert's Werke: Kritisch durchgesehene Gesammtausgabe (AGA): Leipzig, Breitkopf & Härtel:
  - D. 279: Julius Epstein (ed.) Serie 10: Sonaten für Pianoforte — No. 2 (1888).
  - D. 346: Eusebius Mandyczewski (ed.) Serie 21: Supplement — Instrumentalmusik, Band 3 — No. 17 (1897).
- Urtext editions:
  - Paul Badura-Skoda (ed.) Franz Schubert: Piano Sonatas — Volume III (Early and Unfinished Sonatas). G. Henle Verlag (1997).
  - Martino Tirimo (ed.) Schubert: The Complete Piano Sonatas — Volume 1 Vienna: Wiener Urtext Edition (1997). ISMN 979-0-50057-223-7 ISBN 978-3-85055-584-5
- Franz Schubert: Neue Ausgabe sämtlicher Werke (NSA): Kassel, Bärenreiter:
  - Walburga Litschauer (ed.) Series VII: Piano Music, Part 2: Works for Piano Two Hands — Volume 1: Klaviersonaten I (2000). ISMN 9790006497119
  - David Goldberger (ed.) Series VII: Piano Music, Part 2: Works for Piano Two Hands — Volume 4: Klavierstücke I (1988). ISMN 9790006472208
  - Otto Erich Deutsch. Series VIII: Supplement — Volume 4: Franz Schubert, thematisches Verzeichnis seiner Werke in chronologischer Folge (1978), pp 171-173 (D. 277A — D. 279), p 205 (D. 346). ISMN 9790006305148 — ISBN 9783761805718
- Michael Louis Benson. A Comparative Study on the Published Completions of the Unfinished Movements in Franz Schubert's Sonata in C Major, D. 840 ("Reliquie"). ProQuest (2008). ISBN 0549738908 ISBN 9780549738909

Piano sonatas (2 hands) by Franz Schubert
| Preceded by Sonata in E major (D. 157) | AGA, Series 10 (15 sonatas); No. 2 | Succeeded by Sonata in A♭ major (D. 557) |
| Preceded by Sonata in E major (D. 157) | 21 Sonatas numbering system No. 2 | Succeeded by Sonata in E major (D. 459) |
| Preceded by Sonata in E major (D. 157) | 23 Sonatas numbering system No. 2 | Succeeded by Sonata in E major (D. 459) |
