= Piano Sonata in F minor, D 625 (Schubert) =

Musical composition

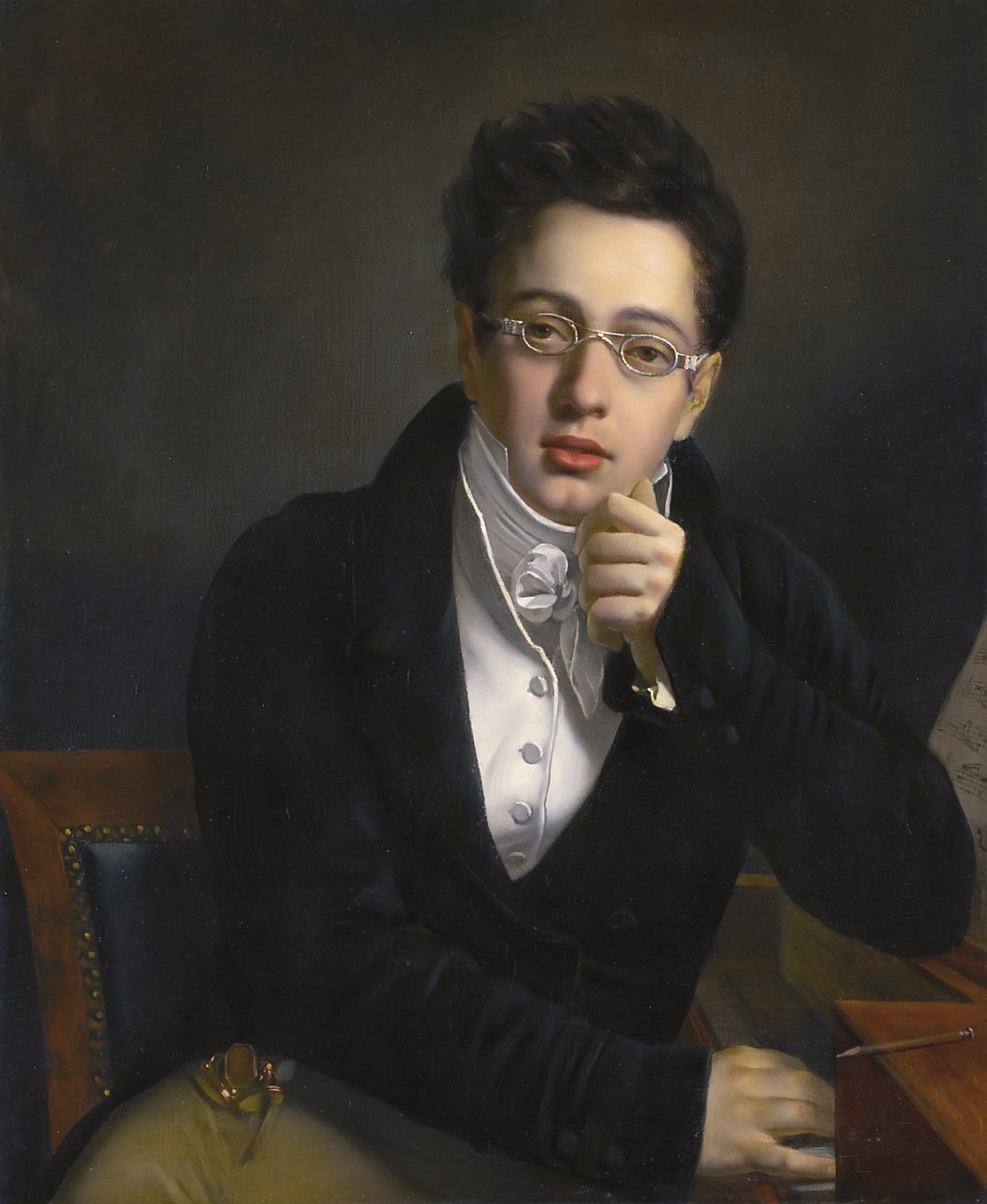
Possible portrait of the young Franz Schubert c. 1814, attributed to Josef Abel

The Piano Sonata in F minor D 625 is a piano sonata written in September 1818 by Franz Schubert. The Adagio D. 505 is assumed to be its slow movement.

== Music ==
The sonata has four movements:

1. Allegro (F minor)
2. Adagio (D♭ major)
3. Scherzo: Allegretto – Trio (E major)
4. Allegro (F minor)

=== I. Allegro ===
The entire movement revolves around the rhythm of the first bars, and there is an extensive use of trills, an element which forms part of the initial motive. The second subject could be described as being "a consolatory version of the first."

As is the case with other Schubert sonatas, the composer left the movement unfinished, breaking off at the beginning of the recapitulation after a substantial development section that modulates extensively. The movement has been completed by Paul Badura-Skoda, who recorded the sonata using his completed version, which was also used by Hanae Nakajima in her complete recording of the sonatas. Martino Tirimo has likewise completed this movement in his edition of the complete piano sonatas, and recorded it. Some pianists, however, such as András Schiff, have recorded the movement as Schubert left it, simply stopping where the manuscript ends.

=== II. Adagio ===
The Adagio D. 505 is listed as the second movement of the sonata in a catalog of Schubert compositions (with incipits) put together by his brother.

=== III. Scherzo: Allegretto - Trio ===
Misha Donat describes the movement as one "whose very distant key and full-blooded sonority following the much leaner texture of the first movement comes as a severe shock."

=== IV. Allegro ===
The choice of key and the turbulent writing, unusual for Schubert, indicate an affinity and influence from Beethoven's "Appassionata" Sonata, Op. 57. While Schubert left only a completed sketch of this movement, the soprano line allows the harmony to be easily reconstructed.

== Notes ==
Piano sonatas (2 hands) by Franz Schubert
Preceded by Sonata in C major (D. 613)	Wiener Urtext Edition (21 Sonatas); No. 12	Succeeded by Sonata in A major (D. 664)
Preceded by Sonata in C major (D. 613)	21 Sonatas numbering system No. 11	Succeeded by Sonata in C♯ minor (D. 655)
Preceded by Sonata in C major (D. 613)	23 Sonatas numbering system No. 13	Succeeded by Sonata in C♯ minor (D. 655)
