= Piano Sonata in E major =

Piano Sonata in E major may refer to:

- Piano Sonata No. 9 (Beethoven)
- Piano Sonata No. 30 (Beethoven)
- Piano Sonata in E major, D 157 (Schubert)
- Piano Sonata in E major, D 459 (Schubert)
