= Piano Sonata in A minor, D 845 (Schubert) =

Composition by Franz Schubert

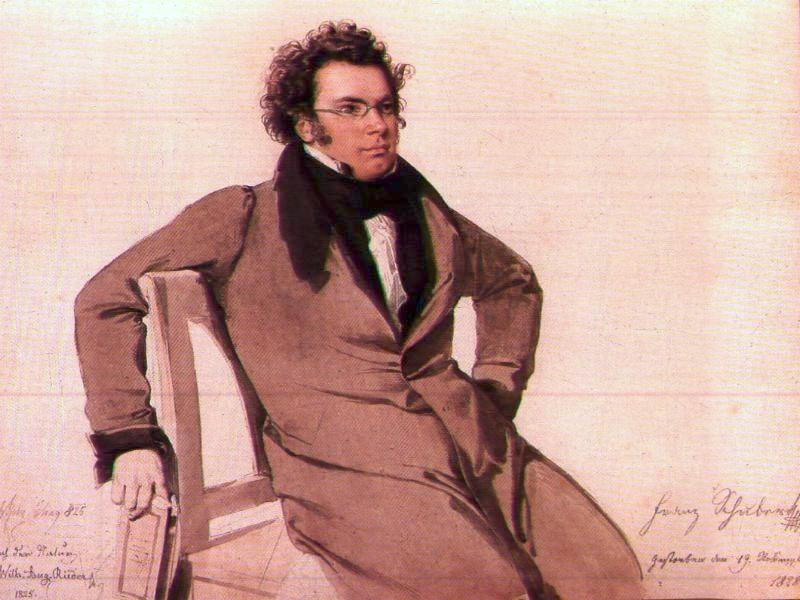
Watercolour of Franz Schubert by Wilhelm August Rieder (1825)

The Piano Sonata in A minor D. 845 (Op.42) by Franz Schubert is a sonata for solo piano. Composed in May 1825 and entitled Premiere Grande Sonata, it is the first of three sonatas published during the composer's lifetime, the others being D. 850 and D. 894. Conceived as a set, these works were composed during what was reportedly a period of relatively good health and spirits for Schubert and are praised for their quality and ambition. This first sonata in particular marks a significant step toward the composer’s mature piano sonata style; the format and several characteristic stylistic elements continue through the last.

== Music ==
The sonata has four movements:

1. Moderato (A minor; Alla breve)
2. Andante poco mosso (C major; Theme and Variations)
3. Scherzo: Allegro vivace – Trio: Un poco più lento (A minor/major, Trio in F major)
4. Rondo: Allegro vivace (A minor)

=== I. Moderato ===
I. Moderato
Performed by Paul Pitman

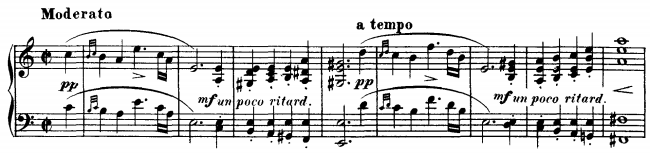
Movement I, opening bars

The first movement is composed in an atypical sonata form. A plaintive, somewhat ominous pianissimo unison octave phrase ornamented with a mordent opens the work, with a contrasting chordal consequent. The rhythmically similar first and second subjects of the exposition are not clearly separated structurally, a feature continued later in the ambiguous segue into the recapitulation. The atmospheric and expansive development, unusual for its time, is characterized by a sense of time dilation and wandering and is an early example of this defining feature of Schubert’s mature works (see the developments of the late sonatas and the string quintet).

The relative major C, as well as the submediant F major, play major structural and dramatic roles in this and later movements. The movement is generally quiet and tense, punctuated by dramatic climaxes and a stentorian coda.

=== II. Andante poco mosso ===
II. Andante poco mosso

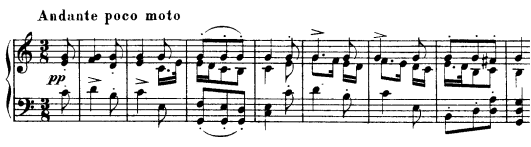
Movement II, Theme

The second movement comprises five variations on a simple 32-bar, two-section theme with elements of counterpoint and chromaticism. The variations generally undergo progressive rhythmic subdivision, with a parallel minor variation followed by a key change that prepares a conclusive return to the tonic for the final variation. This format, which avoids tonal monotony and produces a sense of departure and return, is identical to that of Schubert's Impromptu No. 3 in B♭, D 935 (even including key relationships) and is typical of late classical works in general.

The first variation introduces an eliding chromatic figuration that accompanies the otherwise largely unaltered theme. The second variation is an energetic, liberally ornamented scherzando with ongoing chromatic and minor touches. The bleak, dramatic third variation is in the parallel minor, with a remarkable use of dissonance and a focus on the minor second D♭. This note prepares the key change to the submediant, A♭ major, in variation four, a virtuosic run of fast 32nd notes that makes heavy use of chromaticism and idiomatic pianistic figurations. The final variation, back in C major, is comparatively simple, with repeated chords in eighth-note triplets and a pastoral quality. It retains the focus on D♭ from the previous variation as well as minor key sections, tying together the movement. The piece ends with a brief coda and a plagal cadence.

In most printed versions, the first variation is not exact: four measures (corresponding to m. 20–23 of the theme) are missing after measure 43. This discrepancy was first pointed out by Paul Badura-Skoda. (Neue Zeitschrift für Musik 119, 1958, p. 635-43). The Wiener Urtext edition provides an emendation with the note: "Passage in smaller print — editor's suggested insertion — totally missing in [First Edition], probably due to the engraver's error when changing to a new page. It is inconceivable that Schubert would deliberately omit four measures here since there is complete conformity in the other variations." (Schubert: Sämtliche Klaviersonaten Band 2 (Tirimo), p. 241.) The First Edition is the primary source since the autograph itself is lost.

=== III. Scherzo: Allegro vivace – Trio: Un poco più lento ===
III. Scherzo: Allegro vivace - Trio: Un poco più lento

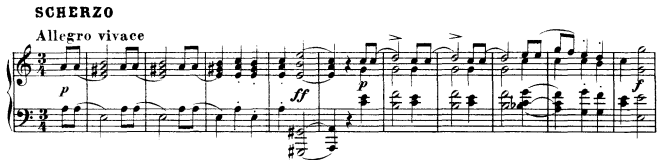
Scherzo

In compound ternary form, the shadowy, mercurial scherzo plays off of elements of the first movement (in particular the V–I–V–I chord sequence from the second theme) and synthesizes, reinforces, and summarizes harmonic and thematic relationships from throughout the sonata, an approach Schubert used in the scherzi in his mature piano sonatas. Odd phrase lengths, subito effects, and unprepared, distant modulations give the scherzo a quirky character. The pastoral F major trio, a gently rocking interlude with soft dynamics, is in stark contrast.

=== IV. Rondo: Allegro vivace ===
IV. Rondo: Allegro vivace

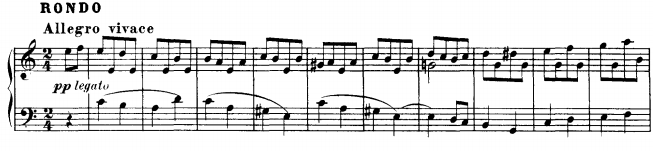
Finale

This movement is in sonata rondo form with a foreshortened recapitulation. The toccata-like rondo theme, like the allegro and scherzo themes, begins in A minor and soon modulates to C major. The V–I–V–I chord sequence featured in the first and third movements again appears prominently in the intervening episodes. The movement is economical, especially for a Schubert finale, and ends briskly with an accelerando closing section.

Piano sonatas (2 hands) by Franz Schubert
Preceded by Sonata in A minor (D. 784)	AGA, Series 10 (15 sonatas); No. 9	Succeeded by Sonata in A major (D. 664)
Preceded by Sonata in C major (D. 840)	21 Sonatas numbering system No. 16	Succeeded by Sonata in D major (D. 850)
Preceded by Sonata in C major (D. 840)	23 Sonatas numbering system No. 18	Succeeded by Sonata in D major (D. 850)
