= Piano Sonata in B major, D 575 (Schubert) =

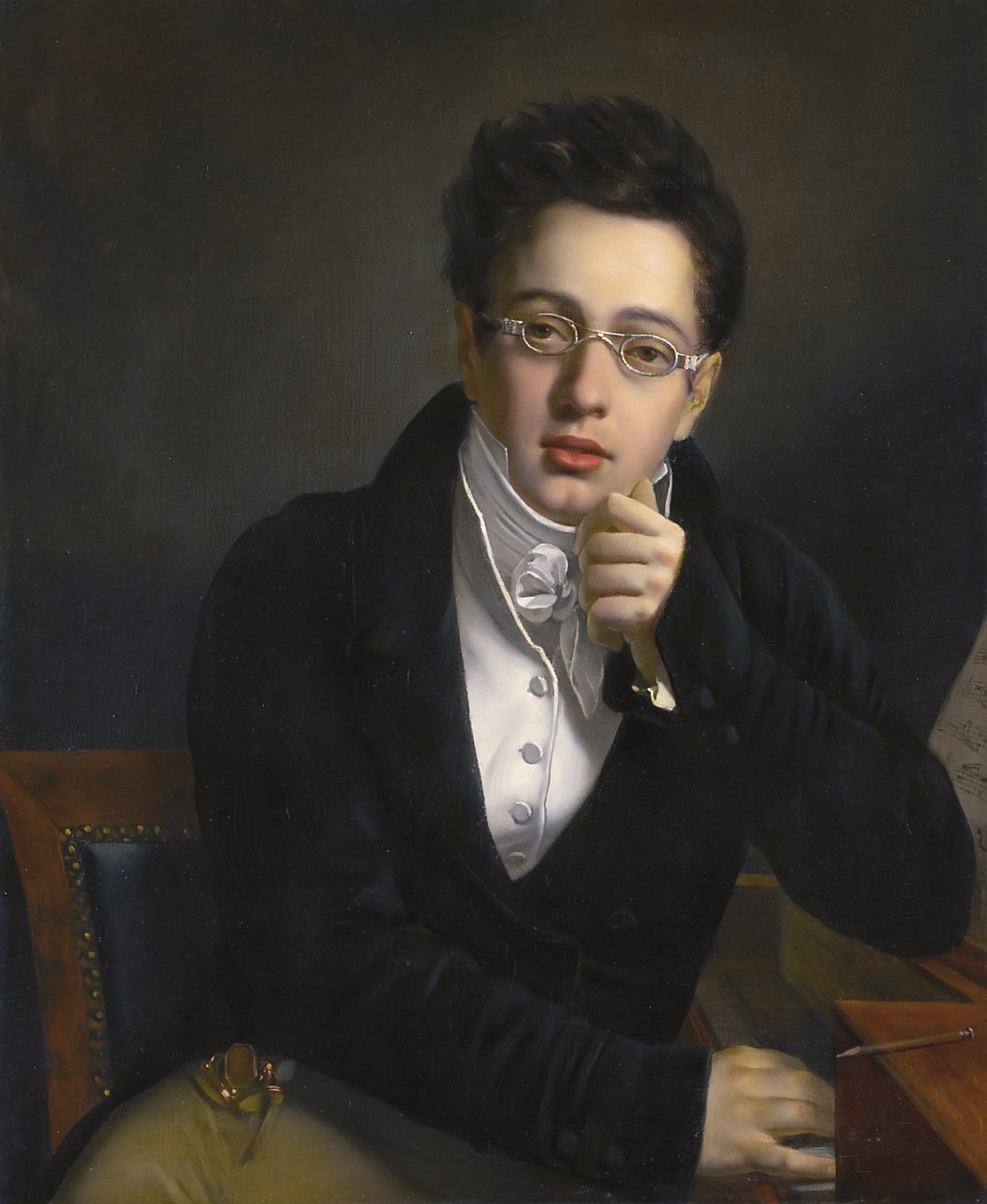
Possible portrait of the young Franz Schubert c. 1814, attributed to Josef Abel

The Piano Sonata in B major D 575 by Franz Schubert is a sonata for solo piano, posthumously published as Op. 147 and given a dedication to Sigismond Thalberg by its publishers. Schubert composed the sonata in August 1817.

The work takes approximately 24 minutes to perform.

== Music ==
The sonata has four movements:

1. Allegro ma non troppo (B major)
2. Andante (E major)
3. Scherzo: Allegretto – Trio (G major, D major)
4. Allegro giusto (B major)

The first movement has a four-key exposition (B major, G major, E major, F♯ major). Daniel Coren has noted that the first movement is the only such movement in Schubert's sonatas in which the recapitulation is an exact transposition of the exposition.

== Notes ==
Piano sonatas (2 hands) by Franz Schubert
Preceded by Sonata in E minor (D. 566)	AGA, Series 10 (15 sonatas); No. 5	Succeeded by Sonata in A minor (D. 537)
Preceded by Sonata in F♯ minor (D. 571)	21 Sonatas numbering system No. 9	Succeeded by Sonata in C major (D. 613)
Preceded by Sonata in F♯ minor (D. 571)	Wiener Urtext Edition (21 Sonatas); No. 10	Succeeded by Sonata in C major (D. 613)
Preceded by Sonata in F♯ minor (D. 571)	23 Sonatas numbering system No. 11	Succeeded by Sonata in C major (D. 613)
