= Piano Sonata in F-sharp minor, D 571 (Schubert) =

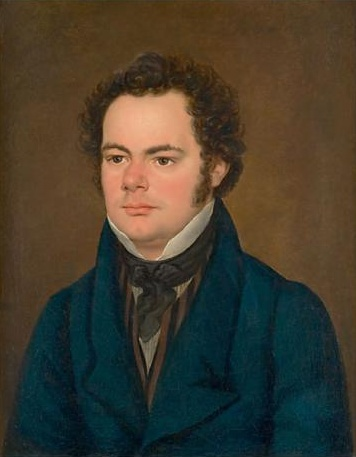
Franz Schubert c. 1827

The Piano Sonata in F♯ minor D 571, was composed by Franz Schubert in July 1817. It was first published in 1888, long after the composer's death, by Breitkopf & Härtel.

The sonata is incomplete, consisting of only a single movement, and even that was abandoned by the composer before completion. Other hands, such as Paul Badura-Skoda, Malcolm Bilson, Howard Ferguson, Noël Lee, and Martino Tirimo, have attempted to realise Schubert's assumed intentions. These hypothetical completions of the sonata have been drawn from such separately published pieces as the piece (usually assumed to be an Andante) in A major, D. 604, and the Allegro vivace in D major and Allegro in F♯ minor, D. 570.

== Movements ==
=== I. Allegro moderato ===
F♯ minor. Fragment (breaks off at the end of the development, implying a recapitulation in the subdominant, B minor)

=== (II. D. 604) ===
A major. In sonata form without development. Unusually, the second subject group is in the subdominant key of D major.

=== (III. Scherzo: Allegro vivace – Trio, D. 570) ===
D major

=== (IV. Allegro, D. 570) ===
F♯ minor. Fragment (breaks off at the end of the development)

== Sources ==
- Tirimo, Martino. Schubert: The Complete Piano Sonatas, Vienna: Wiener Urtext Edition, 1997.

Piano sonatas (2 hands) by Franz Schubert
Preceded by Sonata in E♭ major (D. 568)	21 Sonatas numbering system No. 8	Succeeded by Sonata in B major (D. 575)
Preceded by Sonata in E♭ major (D. 568)	Wiener Urtext Edition (21 Sonatas); No. 9	Succeeded by Sonata in B major (D. 575)
Preceded by Sonata in E♭ major (D. 568)	23 Sonatas numbering system No. 10	Succeeded by Sonata in B major (D. 575)
