= List of solo piano compositions by Franz Schubert =

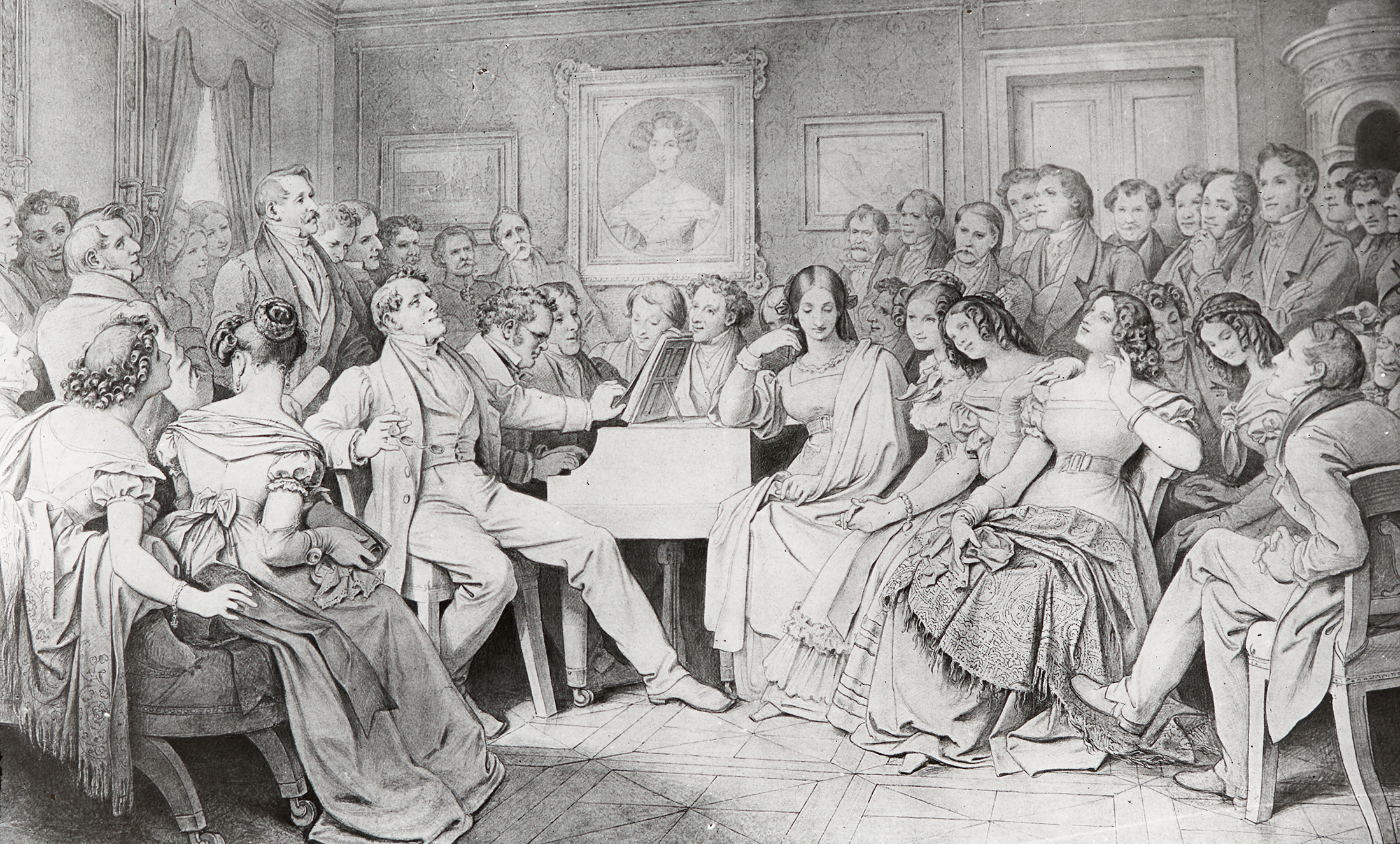
Schubert at the piano in Schubertiade, drawing by Moritz von Schwind (1868)

The following is a list of solo piano works composed by Franz Schubert.

== Quick reference ==
Legend to the table:

✍ indicates a direct link to the manuscript at the Schubert-Autographs website by the Austrian Academy of Sciences

♫ indicates a direct link to the score at International Music Score Library Project (IMSLP)

For the Piano Sonatas: there is no uniform numbering of the sonatas. The Deutsch catalogue does not number the sonatas. In the Neue Schubert-Ausgabe the sonatas are also not numbered. There are several issues which make the numbering difficult: e.g. which of the incomplete sketches are to be included?... in what order are they to be presented?... The current list retains the following numbering systems:

- 15 sonatas — numbering of the piano sonatas according to Franz Schubert's Werke: Kritisch durchgesehene Gesammtausgabe – Serie 10: Sonaten für Pianoforte (Leipzig: Breitkopf & Härtel, 1888), the first publication that claimed to print the complete set of Schubert's piano sonatas. The Deutsch catalogue was yet to be created, so there are no Deutsch numbers in the original 1888 publication. This edition is reprinted from 1970 on by Dover Publications. IMSLP has facsimiles of many of the sonatas according to this first edition, including the numbering X,1 — X,2 — etc. on the score.
- ^{n} 19 sonatas, numbering according to the Neue Schubert-Ausgabe, Series VII/2, volume 1–3.
- 21 sonatas — numbering of Schubert's piano sonatas as most encountered on recordings etc., for instance on the Schubert page at Classical Archives. Also IMSLP follows this numbering for their page names of Schubert's piano sonatas. Wiener Urtext Edition follows the same numbering, except that Op. 122 is No. 8, the ensuing D. 571, 575, 613 and 625 all shift up one number, and D. 655 is an unnumbered fragment.
- 23 sonatas — numbering of the piano sonatas as encountered in Franz SCHUBERT: Catalogo delle composizioni at flaminioonline.it and Franz Schubert Catalogue: 610 - Oeuvres pour piano at musiqueorguequebec.ca.

Note that in Schubert's lifetime "Fantasie" (Fantasy) and "Sonate" (Sonata) had a somewhat overlapping meaning: by convention the Wanderer Fantasy was never numbered as a sonata, while D 894, first published as a Fantasie, always was.

Other columns in the table:

- Op.: Opus number, "(p)" or "posth." indicates a posthumous publication.
- D.: Deutsch number; between square brackets: former Deutsch number

=== Table ===
Completed numbered sonata Unfinished

	^{n}		Op	Name	Orig name	Key	Date	D.	Notes
				Fantasy	Fantasie	C minor	1811	2E [993]	Largo
				Minuet No. 1 (D. 2D)	Menuetto	C major	1811	2D/1 [995]	Draft for a minuet for wind orchestra, first published 1956 (as piano piece)
				Minuet No. 2 (D. 2D)	Menuetto	F major	1811	2D/2 [995]	Draft for a minuet for wind orchestra, first published 1956 (as piano piece)
				Fugue	same ✍	D minor	1811 1813 (?)	13	Allegro maestoso
				Andante	same ✍	C major	9 Sep 1812	29	Thematically identical to Andante for string quintet D 3. Sketched for the 2nd mov. of D 36
				Allegro moderato	✍ ♫	C major	1813, first half	347	fragment
				Minuet (D. 600)	Menuetto ✍ ♫	C♯ minor	Early 1813	600	Trio D 610 was possibly intended for this Minuet.D 600/610 can be inserted in D 613
				Minuets (D. 41)	Menuetti	23 Minuetti	Mid 1813	41	Originally 30 minuets with trio, AGA XII/30 numbers the extant ones 1-20 ♫:
				Sonata (movement)	Sonate ✍ ♫	E major	11 Feb 1815	154	Allegro (fragment) Possible sketch to the first movement of D. 157
				10 Variations	same ♫	F major	15 Feb 1815	156	2 versions of the "Theme" and "Variation II"
1	1	1		Sonata No. 1	Sonate ✍ ♫	E major	Feb 1815	157	Movement 4 is missing.
				Adagio	same	G major	Mid 1815	178	(v1) ✍ ♫ started as clean copy, but later many modifications (v2) fragment ✍ ♫
				Minuet — Trio	same	A minor	1815	277A	Alternate third movement for D. 279
2	2	2		Sonata No. 2	Sonate I ✍ ♫	C major	Sep 1815	279	Movement 4 is missing.
				Allegretto	Allegretto ✍ ♫	C major	Early 1815	346	Fragment, suggested as final movement for D. 279
				Andantino	Andantino ✍ ♫	C major	1817,	348	fragment
				Adagio	Adagio ✍ ♫	C major	Late 1817	349	fragment
	3	3		Sonata No. 3	Fünf Klavier-stücke ♫	E major	Aug 1816 (?)	459; 459A	Piano pieces published in 1843 also known as sonata 3. First two movements (Sonate D. 459) ✍ (2nd movement incomplete in manuscript): Last three movements (D. 459A, also Drei Klavierstücke):
				Andante	same	A major	1816 or 1817	604	Suggested as second movement for D. 571
6	4	4	164 (p)	Sonata No. 5	Sonate	A minor	Mar 1817	537	Three movements
3	5	5		Sonata No. 6	Sonate	A♭ major	May 1817	557	Three movements
			145 #2 (p)	Rondo	same	E major	1817 (?)	506	often added as last movement to D. 566
4	6	6		Sonata No. 7	Sonate	E minor	Jun 1817	566	Movements 1–3 complete with Rondo D 506 added.
	7a	7 v1		Sonata No. 8	Sonate	D♭ major	Jun 1817	568 [567]	unfinished (older version of Op. 122):
	8			Scherzo — Allegro	same	D major F♯ minor	1817 (?)	570	Suggested as last two movements for D. 571.
		8 [9]		Sonata No. 10	Sonate	F♯ minor	1817	571	unfinished Piano Sonata in F♯ minor, D. 571:
5	9	9 [10]	147 (p)	Sonata No. 11	Sonate	B major	Aug 1817	575	Four movements
				13 Variations on a theme by Anselm Hüttenbrenner	13 Var.	A minor	1817	576	
				Scherzo	same	B♭ major	1817	593 #1	Allegretto
				Scherzo	same	D♭ major	1817	593 #2	Allegro moderato
				Fantasy	Fantasia	C major	1818 (?)	605 A	Grazer Fantasy
				Mar	Mare	E major	1818 (?)	606	Allegro con brio
				Trio	same	E major	1818	610	belongs to an unidentified Minuet, maybe D. 600 together with that Minuet it can be inserted in D. 613
				Adagio	same	E major	1818	612	
		10 [11]		Sonata No. 12	Sonate	C major	Apr 1818	613	Both movements are fragments.
			145 #1 (p)	Adagio	same	D♭ major	1818 (?)	505	indicated as second movement of D. 625 first published in E major in an abridged form as Op. Post. 145 no. 1
	10	11 [12]		Sonata No. 13	Sonate	F minor	Sep 1818	625	Movements 1 and 4 are fragments.
		12 [-]		Sonata No. 14	Sonate	C♯ minor	1819	655	unfinished Piano Sonata in C♯ minor, D. 655: 1. Allegro (fragment)
10	11	13	120 (p)	Sonata No. 15	Sonate	A major	1819 or 1825	664	nicknamed little A major sonata, to distinguish it from D. 959. Three movements
				Variation on a waltz by Diabelli	Variation	C minor	1821	718	One of 50 such variations, written by 50 different composers, for Part II of Vaterländischer Künstlerverein, commissioned by Anton Diabelli
			15	Wanderer Fantasy	same	C major	Nov 1822	760	Four movements
				Sonata No. 4	Sonate	E minor	1823 (ca.)	769A [994]	One movement - fragment
			50	34 Valses Sentimentales	same		1823	779	published 1825
			94 #1	Moment Musical No. 1	same	C major	1823	780 #1	Moderato published 1828
			94 #2	Moment Musical No. 2	same	A♭ major	1823	780 #2	Published 1828
8	12	14	143 (p)	Sonata No. 16	Sonate	A minor	Feb 1823	784	Three movements
			94 #3	Moment Musical No. 3 "Air Russe"	same	F minor	Dec 1823	780 #3	Published 1828
				Hungarian Melody	Ungarische Melodie	B minor	1824	817	
			94 #6	Moment Musical No. 6	same	A♭ major	Dec 1824	780 #6	First published 1824 as "Plainte d'un Troubadour" as Moment Musical published 1828.
	13	15		Sonata No. 17 "Reliquie"	Sonate Reliquie	C major	1825	840	Movements 3 and 4 are fragments.
			94 #4	Moment Musical No. 4	same	C♯ minor	1823- 1828	780 #4	Published 1828
			94 #5	Moment Musical No. 5	same	F minor	1823-1828	780 #5	Published 1828
9	14	16	42	Sonata No. 18	Sonate	A minor	May 1825	845	Four movements
11	15	17	53	Sonata No. 19 "Gasteiner"	Sonate Gasteiner	D major	Aug 1825	850	Four movements
7	7b	7 v2 [8]	122 (p)	Sonata No. 9	Sonate	E♭ major	1817- 1826 (?)	568	first version (1817) formerly known as D. 567. Four movements
12	16	18	78	Sonata No. 20 "Fantasy"	Sonate Fantaisie	G major	Oct 1826	894	Four movements
			90 #1	Impromptu No. 1	same	C minor	1827	899 #1	Allegro molto moderato
			90 #2	Impromptu No. 2	same	E♭ major	1827	899 #2	Allegro
			90 #3	Impromptu No. 3	same	G♭ major	1827	899 #3	Andante
			90 #4	Impromptu No. 4	same	A♭ major	1827	899 #4	Allegretto
				Allegretto	same	C minor	1821 (?)	900	Fragment
				Allegretto	same	C minor	1827	915	
			77	12 Valses Nobles	same		1827	969	
			142 #1 (p)	Impromptu No. 1	same	F minor	1827	935 #1	Allegro moderato
			142 #2 (p)	Impromptu No. 2	same	A♭ major	1827	935 #2	Allegretto
			142 #3 (p)	Impromptu No. 3 "Rosamunde"	Impromptu No. 3	B♭ major	Dec 1827	935 #3	Five variations
			142 #4 (p)	Impromptu No. 4	same	F minor	1827	935 #4	Allegro vivace
				Impromptu	Klavierstück	E♭ minor	May 1828	946 #1	
				Impromptu	Klavierstück	E♭ major	May 1828	946 #2	Allegretto
				Impromptu	Klavierstück	C major	May 1828	946 #3	Allegro
13	17	19		Sonata No. 21	Sonate	C minor	Sep 1828	958	Four movements
14	18	20		Sonata No. 22	Sonate	A major	Sep 1828	959	Four movements
15	19	21	post	Sonata No. 23	Sonate	B♭ major	Sep 1828	960	Four movements

== Complete list ==
The table includes the following information:

- D – the catalogue number assigned by Otto Erich Deutsch or NSA authorities
- Former Deutsch Number – information on Deutsch numbers that have been re-assigned, when applicable; listed in "[...]"
- Opus Number – the opus number of the original publication of the work, when applicable; "(p)" or "posth." indicates a posthumous publication
- English Title – The title of the work in an English translation from German
- Informal Title – any additional names by which the work is known, when applicable
- Original Title – The title of the work in German as it appears in the Deutsch catalogue or the Neue Schubert-Ausgabe
- Autograph Link – ✍ a direct link to the manuscript at the Schubert-Autographs website by the Austrian Academy of Sciences
- Score Link – ♫ a direct link to the score at the International Music Score Library Project (IMSLP) website
- Date – the known or assumed date of composition, when available; or date of publication
- Numbering Systems of Piano Sonatas – the numbering of the piano sonatas as listed in the Breitkopf & Härtel and Wiener Urtext Editions, described above
- Version – the number of versions as it pertains to works that have more than one version of the same work/movement
- Notes – any additional information concerning the work: alternate titles, listing of movements or numbers, tempo markings, completeness, relation to other works, authorship, etc.

D	Op.	English Title	Original Title	Date	B&H	WUE	Details/Notes
2D [995]		Six Minuets for Winds (No. 1 in C major, No. 2 in F major)	Sechs Menuette für Blaser (No. 1 in C, No. 2 in F)	1811			Menuetto – Trio; version for piano of Nos. 1-2
2E [993]		Fantasy in C minor	Fantasie in c	1811			Largo – Andantino – Allegro – Largo
13		Fugue in D minor	Fuge in d ✍	ca. 1812			Allegro maestoso
19B		Several Waltzes and a March	Mehrere Walzer und ein Marsch	1812 or 1813?			lost
21		Six Variations in E♭ major	Sechs Variationen in Es	1812			lost
22		Twelve Minuets with Trios	Zwölf Menuette mit Trios	1812			lost
24		Seven Variations in F major	Sieben Variationen in F	1812?			lost
24A		Fugue in C major	Fuge in C	Summer 1812?			Allegro; presumably for piano or organ
24B		Fugue in G major	Fuge in G	Summer 1812?			Allegro; presumably for piano or organ
24C		Fugue in D minor	Fuge in D	Summer 1812?			Maestoso; presumably for piano or organ
24D		Fugue in C major	Fuge in C ✍	Summer 1812?			Maestoso (fragment)
29		Andante in C major	Andante in C ✍ ♫	9 September 1812			version for piano of the Movement for string quartet, D 3; also used in a sketch for the second movement of the String Quartet in C major, D 36
41		Thirty Minuets with Trios	30 Menuette mit Trios ✍ ♫	1813			Nos. 1–8, 11–18 and 20-–23 are extant
41A		Fugue in E minor	Fuge in e ✍	1813			Allegro moderato (fragment)
71B		Fugue in E minor	Fuge in e ✍	July 1813			Maestoso (fragment)
91		Two Minuets, each with Two Trios	Zwei Menuette mit je zwei Trios	22 November 1813			Menuetto – Trio I – Trio II
128		Twelve Viennese German Dances	Zwölf Wiener Deutsche ✍ ♫	1812?			
135		German Dance with Trio in E major	Deutscher mit Trio in E	1815			1st version of the Waltz in E major, D 146 No. 3, with a different title
139		German Dance in C♯ major with Trio in A major	Deutscher in Cis mit Trio in A	1815			
145	18	Twelve Waltzes, Seventeen Ländler and Nine Écossaises	Zwölf Walzer, siebzehn Ländler und neun Ecossaisen ✍ ♫	1815–1821			
146	127(p)	Twenty Waltzes	Zwanzig Walzer ✍ ♫	1815 and 1823			2 versions for No. 3 – the 1st one with a Trio in E major [D 135], and the 2nd one with a Trio in A major; also, 2 versions for No. 5 – the 1st one with a Trio in B♭ major and the 2nd one with a Trio in A♭ major; NSA identifies both earlier versions as "German Dances", not "Waltzes"
154		Sonata in E major	Sonate in E ✍ ♫	11 February 1815			early version of the first movement of the Sonata in E major, D 154 I. Allegro (fragment)
156		Ten Variations in F major	Zehn Variationen in F ♫	15 February 1815			2 versions of the "Theme" and "Variation II"
157		Sonata in E major	Sonate in E ✍ ♫	began on 18 February 1815	1	1	unfinished – first three movements are extant I. Allegro ma non troppo II. Andante; III. Menuetto. Allegro vivace – Trio
158		Écossaise in D minor/F major	Ecossaise in d/F ♫	21 February 1815			
178		Adagio in G major	Adagio in G ✍ ♫	8 April 1815			2 versions; 2nd version is a fragment
277A		Minuet in A minor with Trio in F major	Menuett in a mit Trio in F	September 1815?			alternate third movement for the Sonata in C major, D 279
279		Sonata in C major	Sonate in C ✍ ♫	September 1815	2	2	unfinished – first three movements are extant; the Allegretto in C major, D 346 fragment is probably the fourth movement I. Allegro moderato II. Andante; III. Menuetto. Allegro vivace – Trio; IV. Allegretto (D 346, fragment)
299		Twelve Écossaises	Zwölf Ecossaisen ♫	3 October 1815			
309A		Rondo in C major	Rondo in C ✍	16 October 1815			Allegro vivace (fragment)
334		Minuet in A major with Trio in E major	Menuett in A mit Trio in E ✍ ♫	before Fall 1815			Menuetto. Allegretto – Trio I
335		Minuet with Two Trios in E major	Menuett mit zwei Trios in E ✍ ♫	1813?			Menuetto – Trio I – Trio II
346		Allegretto in C major	Allegretto in C ✍ ♫	1816?			fragment; probably the fourth movement of the Sonata in C major, D 279
347		Allegro moderato in C major	Allegro moderato in C ✍ ♫	1813?			fragment
348		Andantino in C major	Andantino in C ✍ ♫	1816?			fragment
349		Adagio in C major	Adagio in C ✍ ♫	1816?			fragment
365	9	Thirty-six Original Dances, Erste Walzer	36 Originaltänze ✍ ✍ ✍ ♫	March 1818–July 1821			
366		Seventeen Ländler	Siebzehn Ländler ✍ ♫	July–November 1824			
378		Eight Ländler in B♭ major	Acht Ländler in B ✍ ♫	13 February 1816			the upper parts of Nos. 1–5 and 7 also used in Nos. 1–3, 5, 7 and 11 from the Eleven Ländler in B♭ major for violin, D 374
380		Three Minuets, each with Two Trios	Drei Menuette mit je zwei Trios ✍ ♫	22 February 1816			Menuetto – Trio I – Trio II; fragment; for the third minuet, the second strain of the first trio and the entire second trio are missing
420		Twelve German Dances	Zwölf Deutsche ♫	1816			
421		Six Écossaises	Sechs Ecossaisen ♫	May 1816			
459		Sonata in E major	Sonate in E ✍ ♫	August 1816		3	1816, in 2 movements; also paired with D 459A to have a five movement sonata or five piano pieces "Fünf Klavierstücke" I. Allegro moderato II. Scherzo. Allegro
459A		Three piano pieces	Drei Klavierstücke ✍ ♫	1816?			also paired with D 459 to have a five movement sonata or five piano pieces "Fünf Klavierstücke": 1. Adagio; 2. Scherzo. Allegro – Trio. Più tardo 3. Allegro patetico
505	145 No. 1(p)	Adagio in D♭ major	Adagio in Des	September 1818?			probably the second movement of the unfinished Piano Sonata in F minor, D 625
	145 No. 2(p)	Rondo in E major	Rondo in E ✍ ♫	June 1817?			Allegretto moto; probably the fourth movement of the unfinished? Piano Sonata in E minor, D 566
511		Écossaise in E♭ major	Ecossaise in Es ✍	ca. 1817			
529		Eight Écossaises	Acht Ecossaisen ♫	February 1817			
537	164(p)	Sonata in A minor	Sonate in a ♫	March 1817	6	4	I. Allegro ma non troppo II. Allegretto quasi andantino III. Allegro vivace
557		Sonata in A♭ major	Sonate in As ♫	May 1817	3	5	there is not complete certainty that the third movement, in E♭ major, is the Finale of the work I. Allegro moderato II. Andante; III. Allegro
566		Sonata in E minor	Sonate in e ♫	June 1817	4	6	unfinished? – first three movements are extant; the Rondo in E major, D 506 is probably the fourth movement I. Moderato; II. Allegretto; III. Scherzo. Allegro vivace – Trio; IV. Rondo. Allegretto moto (D 506)
568 (1st version) [567]		Piano Sonata in D♭ major	Sonate in Des ✍ ✍ ♫	June 1817		7	the Scherzo in D♭ major, D 593 No. 2 possibly constitutes the third movement; the last movement is a fragment; NSA also appends an amended first movement from the 1st version I. Allegro moderato II. Andante molto III. Scherzo. Allegro moderato – Trio (D 593 No. 2); IV. Allegretto (fragment)
568 (2nd version)	122(p)	Piano Sonata in E♭ major	Sonate in Es ♫	1825–1826?	7	8	I. Allegro moderato II. Andante molto III. Menuetto. Allegro – Trio; IV. Allegro moderato
570		Scherzo in D major and Allegro in F♯ minor	Scherzo in D und Allegro in fis ✍ ♫	July 1817?			the "Allegro" is a fragment; these were probably intended as the third and fourth movements, respectively, of the unfinished Sonata in F♯ minor, D 571
571		Sonata in F♯ minor	Sonate in fis ✍ ♫	July 1817		9	unfinished – fragment of an "Allegro moderato" first movement is extant. The Piano piece in A major, D 604, an Andante, as well as the Scherzo in D major and Allegro in F♯ minor fragment from D 570 probably constitute the remaining movements I. Allegro moderato (fragment); II. Andante (D 604); III. Scherzo. Allegro vivace – Trio (D 570); IV. Allegro (D 570, fragment)
575	147(p)	Sonata in B major	Sonate in H ♫	August 1817	5	10	I. Allegro, ma non troppo II. Andante; III. Scherzo. Allegretto – Trio; IV. Allegro giusto
576		Thirteen Variations on a theme by Anselm Hüttenbrenner in A minor	13 Variationen über ein Thema von Anselm Hüttenbrenner in a ✍ ♫	August 1817			
593		Two Scherzi	Zwei Scherzi ♫	November 1817			1. Allegretto in B♭ major 2. Allegro moderato in D♭ major (possibly the third movement of the unfinished Sonata in D♭ major, D 568 [1st version, formerly D 567])
600		Minuet in C♯ minor	Menuett in cis ✍ ♫	beginning of 1814?			the Trio in E major, D 610 was probably intended for this Minuet; in turn the Minuet with Trio D 600/610 tandem possibly constitute the third movement of the unfinished Sonata in C major, D 613
604		Piano piece in A major	Klavierstück in A ✍ ♫	1816 or July 1817			also appears as "Andante in A major"; probably the second movement of the unfinished Sonata in F♯ minor, D 571
605		Fantasy in C major	Fantasie in C ✍ ♫	between 1821-1823			Without tempo indication – Allegro moderato – Andantino (fragment)
605A		Fantasy in C major for piano, Grazer Fantasy	Fantasie in C	1818?			Moderato con espressione – Alla polacca – più moto – Moderato con espressione – Tempo I
606		March in E major	Marsch in E ♫	1818?			Allegro con brio – Trio
610		Trio in E major, to be regarded as the lost son of a minuet	Trio in E ♫	February 1818			this Trio was probably intended for the Minuet in C♯ minor, D 600; in turn the Minuet with Trio D 600/610 tandem possibly constitute the third movement of the unfinished Sonata in C major, D 613
612		Adagio in E major	Adagio in E ♫	April 1818			probably the second movement of the unfinished Sonata in C major, D 613
613		Sonata in C major	Sonate in C ✍ ♫	April 1818		11	unfinished – fragments of two movements are extant; the Adagio in E major, D 612 as well as the Minuet with Trio D 600/610 possibly constitute the remaining movements I. Moderato (fragment); II. Adagio (D 612); III. Menuetto – Trio (D 600/610); IV. Without tempo indication (fragment)
625		Sonata in F minor	Sonate in f ♫	September 1818		12	unfinished – a completed Scherzo with Trio, and fragments of two "Allegro" movements are extant; the Adagio in D♭ major D 505 is probably the second movement I. Allegro (fragment); II. Adagio (D 505); III. Scherzo. Allegretto – Trio; IV. Allegro (fragment)
643		German Dance in C♯ minor and Écossaise in D♭ major	Deutscher in cis und Ecossaise in Des ♫	1819			
655		Sonata in C♯ minor	Sonate in cis ✍ ♫	April 1819			I. Allegro (fragment)
664	120(p)	Sonata in A major, Little A major	Sonate in A ♫	Summer 1819 or 1825	10	13	I. Allegro moderato II. Andante; III. Allegro
681		Twelve Ländler	Zwölf Ländler	ca. 1815			Nos. 5–12 are extant
697		Six Écossaises in A♭ major	Sechs Ecossaisen in As ♫	May 1820			Nos. 1–4 and 6 are extant
718		Variation in C minor on a Waltz by Anton Diabelli	Variation in c über einen Walzer von Anton Diabelli ♫	March 1821			written for Vaterländischer Künstlerverein
722		German Dance in G♭ major	Deutscher in Ges ♫	8 March 1821			
734	67	Sixteen Ländler and Two Écossaises for piano, Wiener Damen-Ländler	Sechzehn Ländler und zwei Ecossaisen ♫	date unknown; pub. 15 December 1826			
735	49	Galop and Eight Écossaises	Galopp und acht Ecossaisen ♫	date unknown; pub. 21 November 1825			
757A		March in B minor	Marsch in h	15 August 1822			Allegro assai – Trio
759A	69	Overture to the Opera Alfonso und Estrella	Ouvertüre zu der Oper "Alfonso und Estrella" ✍ ♫	November 1822			Andante – Allegro – più moto; version for piano of the Overture from D 732
760	15	Fantasy in C major, Wanderer Fantasy	Fantasie in C ♫	November 1822			I. Allegro con fuoco ma non troppo II. Adagio; III. Presto; IV. Allegro
769		Two German Dances	Zwei Deutsche ✍ ♫	No. 1 January 1824; No. 2 date unknown, pub. 19 December 1823			
769A [994]		Piano Sonata in E minor	Sonate in e ✍ ♫	ca. 1823			I. Allegro (fragment)
779	50	Thirty-four Valses Sentimentales	34 Valses sentimentales ✍ ♫	Nos. 8, 9, 12, 14 February 1823; pub. 21 November 1825			
780	94	Six Moments musicaux	Moments Musicaux ♫	No. 3 before 19 December 1823, No. 6 11 December 1824; pub. 11 July 1828			1. Moderato in C major 2. Andantino in A♭ major 3. Allegro moderato in F minor, Air russe 4. Moderato in C♯ minor 5. Allegro vivace in F minor 6. Allegretto in A♭ major, Plainte d'un Troubadour
781		Twelve Écossaises	Zwölf Ecossaisen ♫	January 1823			Nos. 2–12 are extant
782		Écossaise in D major	Ecossaise in D	date unknown; pub. 21 February 1824			
783	33	Sixteen German Dances and Two Écossaises	16 Deutsche und zwei Ecossaisen ✍ ♫	partly composed between January 1823–July 1824; pub. 8 January 1825			German Dances Nos. 8 and 9 also used in D 366, D 814
784	143(p)	Sonata in A minor, Grande Sonate	Sonate in a ♫	February 1823	8	14	I. Allegro giusto II. Andante; III. Allegro vivace
790	171(p)	Twelve German Dances	Zwölf Deutsche ♫	May 1823			also appear as "Twelve Ländler"
816		Three Écossaises	Drei Ecossaisen ✍	September 1824			
817		Hungarian Melody in B minor	Ungarische Melodie in h ♫	2 September 1824			Allegretto
820		Six German Dances	Sechs Deutsche ♫	October 1824			
840		Sonata in C major, Reliquie	Sonate in C ✍ ♫	April 1825		15	unfinished – first and second movements are complete; third and fourth movements are fragments I. Moderato; II. Andante; III. Menuetto. Allegretto – Trio (fragment); IV. Rondo. Allegro (fragment)
841		Two German Dances	Zwei Deutsche	April 1825			
844		Waltz in G major for piano, Albumblatt	Walzer in G ♫	16 April 1825			
845	42	Sonata in A minor	Sonate in a ♫	Before the end of May 1825	9	16	I. Moderato; II. Andante poco mosso III. Scherzo. Allegro vivace – Trio. Un poco più lento IV. Rondo. Allegro vivace
850	53	Sonata in D major, Gasteiner	Sonate in D ✍ ♫	August 1825	11	17	I. Allegro; II. Con moto III. Scherzo. Allegro vivace – Trio; IV. Rondo. Allegro moderato
894	78	Sonata in G major, Fantasie	Sonate in G ♫	October 1826	12	18	NSA also appends a discarded 1st version of the second movement I. Molto moderato e cantabile II. Andante; III. Menuetto. Allegro moderato – Trio; IV. Allegretto
899	90	Four Impromptus for piano	Vier Impromptus ✍ ♫	Summer–Fall 1827?			1. Allegro molto moderato in C minor 2. Allegro in E♭ major 3. Andante in G♭ major 4. Allegretto in A♭ major
900		Allegretto in C minor	Allegretto in c ✍ ♫	after 1820?			fragment
915		Allegretto in C minor	Allegretto in c ♫	26 April 1827			
916B		Piano Piece in C major	Klavierstück in C ✍	Summer–Fall 1827?			Allegro (sketch)
916C		Piano piece in C minor	Klavierstück in c ✍	Summer–Fall 1827?			Without tempo indication (sketch)
924	91	Twelve Grazer Waltzes	Zwölf Grazer Walzer ♫	September 1827?			
925		Grazer Galopp in C major	Grazer Galopp in C ♫	September 1827?			
935	142(p)	Four Impromptus	Vier Impromptus ✍ ♫	December 1827			1. Allegro moderato in F minor 2. Allegretto in A♭ major 3. Thema e variazioni in B♭ major, Rosamunde; 4. Allegro scherzando in F minor
944A		German Dance in an unknown key	Deutscher	1 March 1828			lost
946		Three piano pieces	Drei Klavierstücke ✍ ✍ ♫	May 1828			1. Allegro assai in E♭ minor 2. Allegretto in E♭ major 3. Allegro in C major
958		Sonata in C minor	Sonate in c ✍ ♫	September 1828	13	19	I. Allegro; II. Adagio; III. Menuetto. Allegro – Trio; IV. Allegro
959		Sonata in A major	Sonate in A ✍ ♫	September 1828	14	20	I. Allegro; II. Andantino; III. Scherzo. Allegro vivace – Trio. Un poco più lento IV. Rondo. Allegretto
960		Sonata in B♭ major	Sonate in B ✍ ♫	September 1828	15	21	I. Molto moderato II. Andante sostenuto III. Scherzo. Allegro vivace e con delicatezza – Trio; IV. Allegro, ma non troppo
969	77	Twelve Waltzes, Valses nobles	Zwölf Walzer ♫	date unknown; pub. 1827			
970		Six Ländler	Sechs Ländler ♫	date unknown; pub. 1889			also appear as "Six German Dances"
971		Three German Dances	Drei Deutsche ♫	date unknown; pub. 1823			
972		Three German Dances	Drei Deutsche ♫	before 1817			
973		Three German Dances	Drei Deutsche ♫	1823?			
974		Two German Dances	Zwei Deutsche ♫	1822?			
975		German Dance in D major	Deutscher in D ♫	1824?			
976		Cotillon in E♭ major	Cotillon in Es ♫	date unknown; pub. 1825			
977		Eight Écossaises	Acht Ecossaisen ♫	1816?			
978		Waltz in A♭ major	Walzer in As	date unknown; pub. 1825			
979		Waltz in G major	Walzer in G	date unknown; pub. 1826			
980		Two Waltzes	Zwei Walzer	date unknown; pub. 1826			
980A [640]		Two Dances	Zwei Tänze	date unknown; before 1821			sketches
980B [679]		Two Ländler in E♭ major	Zwei Ländler in Es	1816?			
980C [680]		Two Ländler in D♭ major	Zwei Ländler in Des	date unknown; before 1821			fragment
980D		Waltz in C major, Krähwinkler Tanz	Walzer in C	date unknown; pub. 1828			
980E		Two Dances	Zwei Tänze	date unknown; after 1818?			for piano?; sketches
980F		March in G major	Marsch in G	date unknown; pub. 1989			piano reduction of a lost march for orchestra?
Anh. I/8		Sonata in F major	Sonate in F	1815			lost or identical to D 157
Anh. I/9		Sonata in F major	Sonate in F	1816			lost or identical to D 459
Anh. I/10		Fantasy in E♭ major	Fantasie in Es	1825?			lost or identical to a possible earlier version of D 568
Anh. I/12		Seven Easy Variations in G major	Sieben leichte Variationen in G	1810?			presumably not by Schubert
Anh. I/13		Six German Dances	Sechs Deutsche	1814			lost
Anh. I/14		Waltz [in G♭ major], Kupelwieser-Walzer	Walzer	17 September 1826			transcribed by Richard Strauss
Anh. I/15 [336]		Minuet with Trio in D major	Menuett mit Trio in D ✍	date unknown			presumably not by Schubert
deest		Fugue in an unknown key	Fuge	1813			lost
deest		Fugue in F major	Fuge in F	1813			sketch
deest		Themes to Two Minuets	Themen zu zwei Menuetten	1813?			sketches
deest		Four Dances in A major	Neun Incipits zu Tänzen in A	1816?			While there are incipits for nine dances, five correspond to sets which do have Deutsch numbers; only four have not currently been assigned a Deutsch number
deest		Écossaise in G major, Ländler in F major and Ländler in F minor (?)	Ecossaise in G, Ländler in F und Ländler in f (?)	1818?			sketches
deest		Sonata in C♯ major	Sonate in Cis	1825?			lost or identical to D 568 (1st version)

== Scores ==
- Schubert-Autographs by Austrian Academy of Sciences
- Category:Schubert, Franz at IMSLP
- Franz Schubert's Werke: Kritisch durchgesehene Gesammtausgabe (= Alte Gesamtausgabe = AGA):
  - Julius Epstein (ed.) Serie 10: Sonaten für Pianoforte. Leipzig: Breitkopf & Härtel, 1888.
    - (replication): Franz Schubert. Complete Sonatas for Pianoforte Solo. New York: Dover Publications, 1970. ISBN 0-486-22647-6
  - Julius Epstein (ed.) Serie 11: Phantasie, Impromptus und andere Stücke für Pianoforte. Leipzig: Breitkopf & Härtel, 1888.
  - Julius Epstein (ed.) Serie 12: Tänze für Pianoforte. Leipzig: Breitkopf & Härtel, 1889
  - Eusebius Mandyczewski (ed.) Serie 21: Supplement: Instrumentalmusik; Gesangsmusik. Leipzig: Breitkopf & Härtel, 1897.
  - Julius Epstein, Eusebius Mandyczewski (eds.) Revisionsbericht - Serie X: Sonaten für Pianoforte. Leipzig: Breitkopf & Härtel, 1893
  - Julius Epstein, Eusebius Mandyczewski (eds.) Revisionsbericht - Serie XI: Phantasie, Impromptus und andere Stücke für Pianoforte. Leipzig: Breitkopf & Härtel, 1894
  - Revisionsbericht - Serie XII: Tänze für Pianoforte. Leipzig: Breitkopf & Härtel
  - Revisionsbericht - Serie XXI: Supplement. Leipzig: Breitkopf & Härtel
- Henle (Urtext Edition):
  - Paul Mies (ed.) Piano Sonatas, Volume I. 1971.
  - Paul Mies (ed.) Piano Sonatas, Volume II. 1973.
  - Paul Badura-Skoda (ed.) Piano Sonatas, Volume III (Early and Unfinished Sonatas). 1997.
  - Walter Gieseking (ed.) Impromptus and Moments musicaux. 1948.
  - Paul Mies (ed.) 3 Piano Pieces (Impromptus) Op. posth. D 946. 1976.
  - Gertraut Haberkamp (ed.) Piano Pieces - Piano Variations. 1992.
  - Paul Mies (ed.) Complete Dances, Volume I and Volume II. 1982.
- Wiener Urtext Edition:
  - Martino Tirimo (ed.) Franz Schubert: The Complete Piano Sonatas. 1997.
    - Vol. 1 ISMN 979-0-50057-223-7 ISBN 978-3-85055-584-5
    - Vol. 2 ISMN 979-0-50057-224-4 ISBN 978-3-85055-552-4
    - Vol. 3 ISMN 979-0-50057-225-1 ISBN 978-3-85055-553-1
  - Paul Badura-Skoda (ed.)
    - Franz Schubert: Fantasy C major "Wanderer-Fantasie" ISMN 979-0-50057-009-7 ISBN 978-3-85055-009-3
    - Franz Schubert: Impromptus, Moments musicaux, Three Piano Pieces ISMN 979-0-50057-000-4 ISBN 978-3-85055-001-7
  - Alexander Weinmann (ed.) Franz Schubert: The Complete Dances for Piano
    - Vol. 1 ISMN 979-0-50057-020-2 ISBN 978-3-85055-020-8
    - Vol. 2 ISMN 979-0-50057-021-9 ISBN 978-3-85055-021-5
- Franz Schubert: Neue Ausgabe sämtlicher Werke (= Neue Gesamtausgabe = NGA = Neue Schubert-Ausgabe = NSA = New Schubert Edition = NSE):
  - Walburga Litschauer (ed). Series VII Part 2 Volume 1: Klaviersonaten I. Kassel: Bärenreiter, 2000. ISMN 9790006497119
  - Walburga Litschauer (ed). Series VII Part 2 Volume 2: Klaviersonaten II. Kassel: Bärenreiter, 2003. ISMN 9790006497195
  - Walburga Litschauer (ed). Series VII Part 2 Volume 3: Klaviersonaten III. Kassel: Bärenreiter, 1996. ISMN 9790006472475
  - David Goldberger (ed). Series VII Part 2 Volume 4: Klavierstücke I. Kassel: Bärenreiter, 1988. ISMN 9790006472208
  - Christa Landon and Walther Dürr (eds). Series VII Part 2 Volume 5: Klavierstücke II. Kassel: Bärenreiter, 1984. ISMN 9790006472161
  - Walburga Litschauer (ed). Series VII Part 2 Volume 6: Tänze I. Kassel: Bärenreiter, 1989. ISMN 9790006472246
  - Walburga Litschauer (ed). Series VII Part 2 Volume 7a: Tänze II. Kassel: Bärenreiter, 1990. ISMN 9790006472277
  - Alfred Mann (ed). Series VIII Volume 2: Schuberts Studien. Kassel: Bärenreiter, 1986. ISMN 9790006472192

== Lists of (piano) compositions by Schubert ==
- (in German) Otto Erich Deutsch. Franz Schubert, thematisches Verzeichnis seiner Werke in chronologischer Folge (New Schubert Edition Series VIII Supplement, Volume 4). Kassel: Bärenreiter, 1978. ISMN 9790006305148 – ISBN 9783761805718
  - Aderhold, Werner (ed.) Franz Schubert: Deutsch-Verzeichnis – Studienausgabe. Kassel: Bärenreiter, 2012. ISMN 9790006315864 – ISBN 9783761812587
  - Franz Schubert, Thematisches Verzeichnis seiner Werke in chronologischer Folge on-line copy at archive.org
- Schubert Database by Neue Schubert-Ausgabe
- List of works by Franz Schubert at International Music Score Library Project
- (in French) Franz Schubert Catalogue: 610 - Oeuvres pour piano at musiqueorguequebec.ca
- (in Italian) Franz SCHUBERT: Catalogo delle composizioni at flaminioonline.it

== Other sources ==
- Eva Badura-Skoda and Peter Branscombe. Schubert Studies: Problems of Style and Chronology. Cambridge University Press, 1982.
- Brian Newbould. Schubert: The Music and the Man. University of California Press, 1999. ISBN 0520219570 ISBN 9780520219571
- Reinhard Van Hoorickx. "Franz Schubert (1797–1828) List of the Dances in Chronological Order" in Revue belge de Musicologie/Belgisch Tijdschrift voor Muziekwetenschap, Vol. 25, No. 1/4, pp. 68–97, 1971
- Reinhard Van Hoorickx. "Thematic Catalogue of Schubert's Works: New Additions, Corrections and Notes" in Revue belge de Musicologie/Belgisch Tijdschrift voor Muziekwetenschap, Vol. 28/30, pp. 136–171, 1974—1976.
