= Piano Sonata in E minor, D 566 (Schubert) =

Composition by Franz Schubert

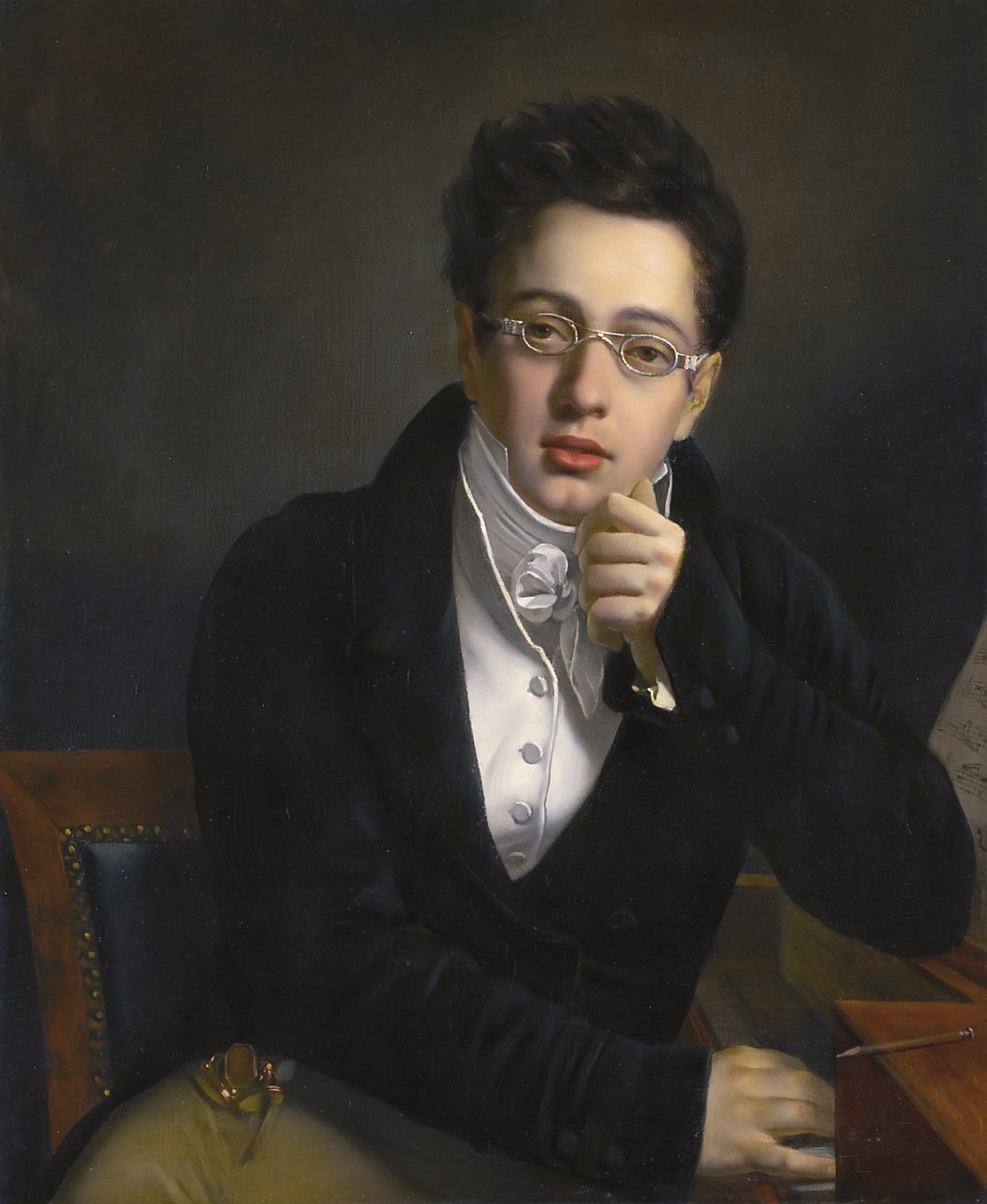
Possible portrait of the young Franz Schubert c. 1814, attributed to Josef Abel

The Piano Sonata in E minor D 566 by Franz Schubert is a sonata for solo piano written in June 1817. The original manuscript appeared to lack a finale. Ludwig Scheibler (1848–1921) was the first to suggest in 1905 that the Rondo in E, D.506 might be that movement. The British composer and musicologist Kathleen Dale produced the first edition using this suggestion in 1948. The 1976 Henle edition by Paul Badura-Skoda followed the same practice.

The work takes approximately 20 minutes to perform or 25–30 minutes with the rondo finale.

== Movements ==
The movements are as follows.

I. Moderato in E minor
II. Allegretto in E major
III. Scherzo: Allegro vivace – Trio in A♭ major
(IV. Rondo: Allegretto, D 506) in E major

D 506 has been associated with the last piece of Fünf Klavierstücke (D 459A/3) and the Adagio D 349 too as a set of movements that might form a sonata.

Piano sonatas (2 hands) by Franz Schubert
Preceded by Sonata in A♭ major (D. 557)	AGA, Series 10 (15 sonatas); No. 4	Succeeded by Sonata in B major (D. 575)
Preceded by Sonata in A♭ major (D. 557)	21 Sonatas numbering system No. 6	Succeeded by Sonata in D♭ major (D. 568)
Preceded by Sonata in A♭ major (D. 557)	23 Sonatas numbering system No. 7	Succeeded by Sonata in D♭ major (D. 568)
