= Drei Klavierstücke =

Drei Klavierstücke (Three Piano Pieces) may refer to:

- Arnold Schoenberg:
  - Drei Klavierstücke (1894)
  - Drei Klavierstücke (Schoenberg), Op. 11 (1909)
- Franz Schubert:
  - Drei Klavierstücke D 459A, upon first publication appended to Piano Sonata in E major, D 459
  - Drei Klavierstücke D 946, a.k.a. Schubert's three last Impromptus (Schubert)
