= Piano Sonata in C-sharp minor, D 655 (Schubert) =

Piano Sonata - Schubert - Austria

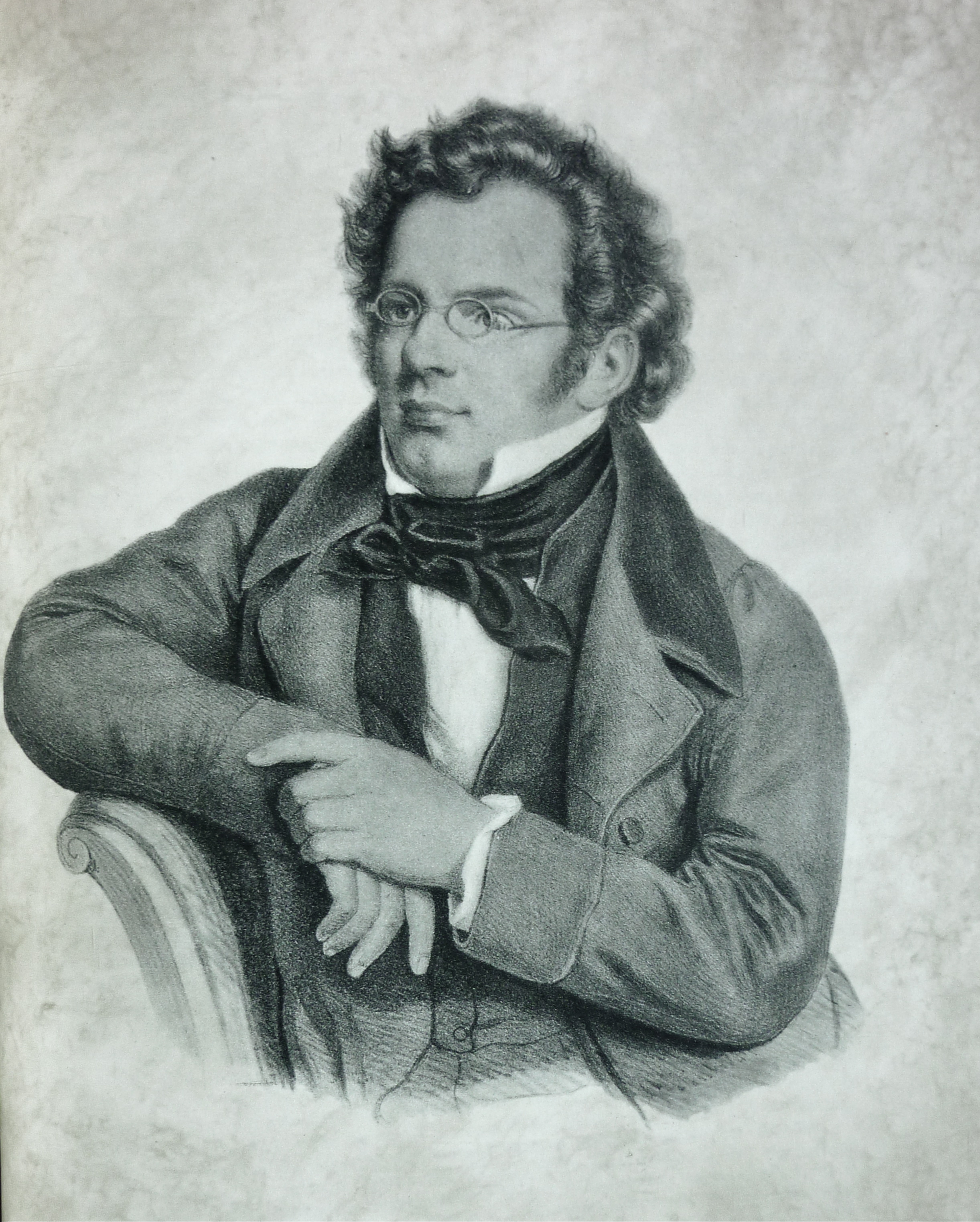
Franz Schubert

The Piano Sonata in C♯ minor, D. 655 is a piano sonata written by Franz Schubert.

The sonata is incomplete, consisting of only a single movement, and even that was abandoned by the composer before completion. Other hands, such as Howard Ferguson and Noël Lee, have attempted to realise Schubert's assumed intentions.

The single fragmentary movement is in C♯ minor and is in sonata form, breaking off at the end of the exposition. Schubert uses a three-key exposition, with a first subject group in the tonic and then a second subject group, first in E major (the relative major) and then G♯ major (the dominant major). Unusually, the second subject group is over four times as long as the first.

== Sources ==
- Piano Sonata D. 655: Scores at the International Music Score Library Project

Piano sonatas (2 hands) by Franz Schubert
Preceded by Sonata in F minor (D. 625)	21 Sonatas numbering system No. 12	Succeeded by Sonata in A major (D. 664)
Preceded by Sonata in F minor (D. 625)	23 Sonatas numbering system No. 14	Succeeded by Sonata in A major (D. 664)
