= Piano Sonata in A-flat major =

Piano Sonata in A-flat major may refer to:

- Piano Sonata No. 12 (Beethoven)
- Piano Sonata No. 31 (Beethoven)
- Piano Sonata in A-flat major, D 557 (Schubert)
