= Piano Sonata in A minor, D 537 (Schubert) =

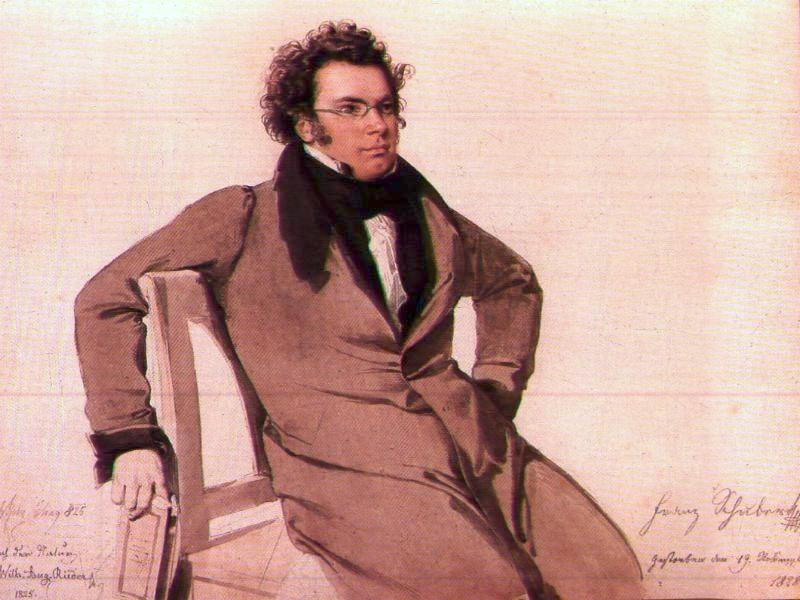
Watercolour of Franz Schubert by Wilhelm August Rieder (1825)

The Piano Sonata in A minor, D 537, of Franz Schubert is a sonata for solo piano, composed in March 1817.

== Music ==
The sonata has three movements:

1. Allegro ma non troppo (A minor)
2. Allegretto quasi andantino (E major)
3. Allegro vivace (A minor)

=== I. Allegro ma non troppo ===
The first movement is in sonata form. The exposition modulates to the submediant, F major, rather than to the usual mediant, C major. The recapitulation begins in the subdominant, D minor, and most of the recapitulation's second group is in A major before a short coda returns to the minor mode for the movement's ending.

=== II. Allegretto quasi andantino ===
The second movement is a five-part rondo with an unconventional key scheme as follows:

A (E major) → B (C major) → A (F major) → C (D minor) → A (E major)

Schubert also composes brief transitions at the ends of each episode—that between the B section and the medial A section features a small amount of the B section's material in F major (the medial A section's key), while that between the C section and the final A section modulates from the C section's D minor up a tone to E minor, and then sits on its dominant for a few measures before the return to the movement's tonic key with the final A section. The movement ends with a short coda that is completely diatonic.

=== III. Allegro vivace ===
The third movement is in sonata form without a development. The exposition begins with A minor and modulates to E major. The recapitulation begins in E minor and moves to A major, in which the movement ends.

The work takes approximately 25 minutes to perform. Daniel Coren has summarised the nature of the recapitulation in the last movement of this sonata. Harald Krebs has noted that Schubert reworked the opening of the second movement of the D. 537 sonata into the opening theme of the finale of the A major piano sonata, D. 959.

== In popular culture ==
The piano sonata is featured in the 1985 film adaptation of E. M. Forster's A Room with a View, as protagonist Lucy Honeychurch is practicing piano.

== Notes ==
Piano sonatas (2 hands) by Franz Schubert
Preceded by Sonata in B major (D. 575)	AGA, Series 10 (15 sonatas); No. 6	Succeeded by Sonata in E♭ major (D. 568)
Preceded by Sonata in E major (D. 459)	21 Sonatas numbering system No. 4	Succeeded by Sonata in A♭ major (D. 557)
Preceded by Sonata in E minor (D. 769A)	23 Sonatas numbering system No. 5	Succeeded by Sonata in A♭ major (D. 557)
