= D 506 =

D 506 can refer to:

- D. 506, the Rondo from Schubert's Piano Sonata in E minor D. 566 (Schubert)
- Rule D 506, a rule of the US Securities Exchange Commission exempting certain businesses from securities regulation
