= Piano Sonata in A major, D 664 (Schubert) =

Composition for piano by Franz Schubert

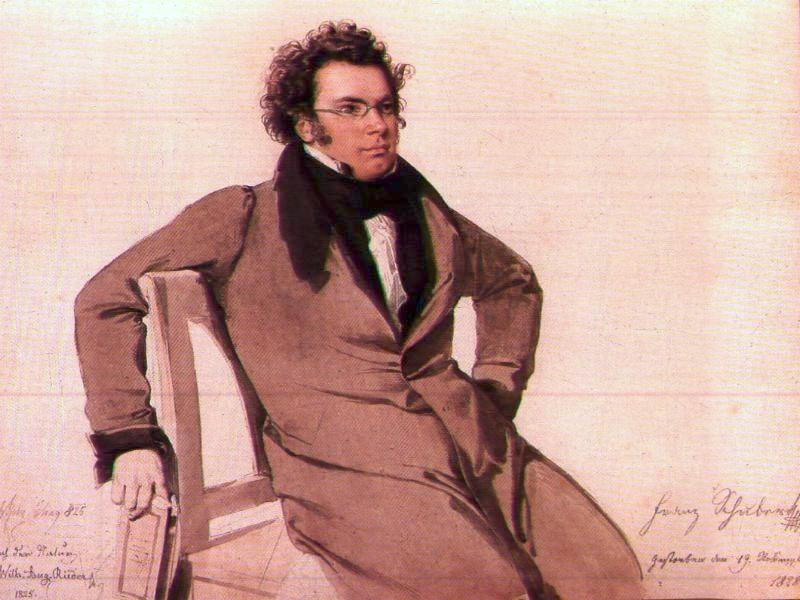
Watercolour of Franz Schubert by Wilhelm August Rieder (1825)

The Piano Sonata in A major, D 664, Op. posth. 120, is a sonata for solo piano composed by Franz Schubert in the summer of 1819.

== Movements ==
I. Allegro moderato

II. Andante (in D major)

III. Allegro
Performed by Paul Pitman

This piano sonata, numbered D 664 in the Schubert Thematic Catalogue, consists of three movements:

1. Allegro moderato
2. Andante (in D major)
3. Allegro

Well regarded among pianists, the "Little" A major sonata is so called to distinguish it from the hefty 1828 sonata in the same key. It is the shortest among Schubert's complete sonatas. The manuscript, completed in July 1819, was dedicated to 18-year-old Josephine von Koller of Steyr in Upper Austria, whom he considered to be "very pretty" and "a good pianist". The lyrical, buoyant, in spots typically poignant nature of this sonata fits the image of a young Schubert in love, living in a summery Austrian countryside, which he also considered to be "unimaginably lovely".

The A major sonata is straightforward, with a dulcet melodic opening. It was the first of Schubert's piano sonatas where the sonata form as perfected by his idol, Beethoven, does not seem to be wrestled with; rather, it is a "joyous breakthrough", a carefree triumph over strict rules of construction.

The original manuscript to this "little" sonata has been lost.

James Webster noted the particular A–B–A form of the first movement's first thematic group. Daniel Coren summarised the nature of the recapitulations in the first and third movements. Leo Black noted Schubert's reworking of the opening theme from the sonata's slow movement into his song "Der Unglückliche".

Piano sonatas (2 hands) by Franz Schubert
Preceded by Sonata in A minor (D 845)	AGA, Series 10 (15 sonatas); No. 10	Succeeded by Sonata in D major (D 850)
Preceded by Sonata in F minor (D 625)	Wiener Urtext Edition (21 Sonatas); No. 13	Succeeded by Sonata in A minor (D 784)
Preceded by Sonata in C♯ minor (D 655)	21 Sonatas numbering system No. 13	Succeeded by Sonata in A minor (D 784)
Preceded by Sonata in C♯ minor (D 655)	23 Sonatas numbering system No. 15	Succeeded by Sonata in A minor (D 784)
