= Piano Sonata in A-flat major, D 557 (Schubert) =

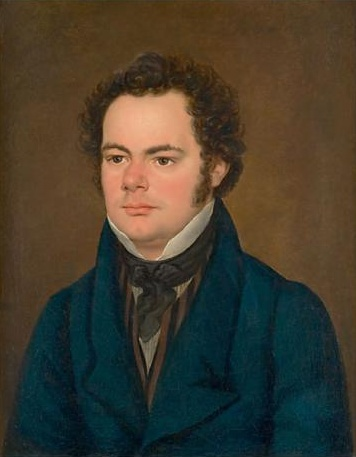
Franz Schubert

Franz Schubert's Piano Sonata in A♭ major, D 557 was composed in May 1817.

== Movements ==
The work is relatively short and a performance takes somewhat between 10 and 15 minutes. The sonata is cheerful and uncomplicated, and carries remembrances of Mozart and the Baroque era.

1. Allegro moderato, A♭ major
2. Andante, E♭ major
3. Allegro, E♭ major

The beginning of the first movement resembles the opening of the menuetto, D. 380, Nr. 3.

The final movement has a dance-like character. The fact that it is in the key of E♭ major rather than the tonic key of A♭ major is evidence in favor of Schubert possibly intending to add a fourth movement, although the extant third movement has much of the character of a finale. At the time this was written it was quite unusual to end a composition in another key than its tonic, however Schubert did do this in some of his early works, e.g. D. 553 ("Auf der Donau", beginning in E♭ major and ending in F♯ minor).

== Score ==
The sonata was first published in 1888, in the Breitkopf & Härtel complete edition.

Manuscripts

The autograph of the sonata, dated May 1817, is incomplete — it stops at the 28th measure of the third movement, but there is a contemporary complete manuscript.

First publication — Alte Gesammtausgabe (AGA)

D. 557 was first published in 1888 as No. 3 of the Piano Sonatas volume (Series X) of the Kritisch durchgesehene Gesammtausgabe.

Urtext Editions

Both Paul Badura-Skoda (Henle) and Martino Tirimo (Wiener Urtext) published an Urtext edition in 1997.

Neue Schubert-Ausgabe (NSA)

In the New Schubert Edition D. 557 is given in VII/2/1.

== Sources ==
- Franz Schubert's Werke: Kritisch durchgesehene Gesammtausgabe (AGA): Leipzig, Breitkopf & Härtel:
  - Julius Epstein (ed.) Serie 10: Sonaten für Pianoforte — No. 3 (1888).
- Urtext editions:
  - Paul Badura-Skoda (ed.) Franz Schubert: Piano Sonatas — Volume III (Early and Unfinished Sonatas). G. Henle Verlag (1997).
  - Martino Tirimo (ed.) Schubert: The Complete Piano Sonatas — Volume 1 Vienna: Wiener Urtext Edition (1997). ISMN 979-0-50057-223-7 ISBN 978-3-85055-584-5
- Franz Schubert: Neue Ausgabe sämtlicher Werke (NSA): Kassel, Bärenreiter:
  - Otto Erich Deutsch. Series VIII: Supplement — Volume 4: Franz Schubert, thematisches Verzeichnis seiner Werke in chronologischer Folge — pp. 323-324 (1978). ISMN 9790006305148 — ISBN 9783761805718
  - Walburga Litschauer (ed.) Series VII: Piano Music, Part 2: Works for Piano Two Hands — Volume 1: Klaviersonaten I (2000). ISMN 9790006497119

Piano sonatas (2 hands) by Franz Schubert
Preceded by Sonata in C major (D. 279)	AGA, Series 10 (15 sonatas); No. 3	Succeeded by Sonata in E minor (D. 566)
Preceded by Sonata in A minor (D. 537)	21 Sonatas numbering system No. 5	Succeeded by Sonata in E minor (D. 566)
Preceded by Sonata in A minor (D. 537)	23 Sonatas numbering system No. 6	Succeeded by Sonata in E minor (D. 566)
