= Piano Sonata in E major, D 459 (Schubert) =

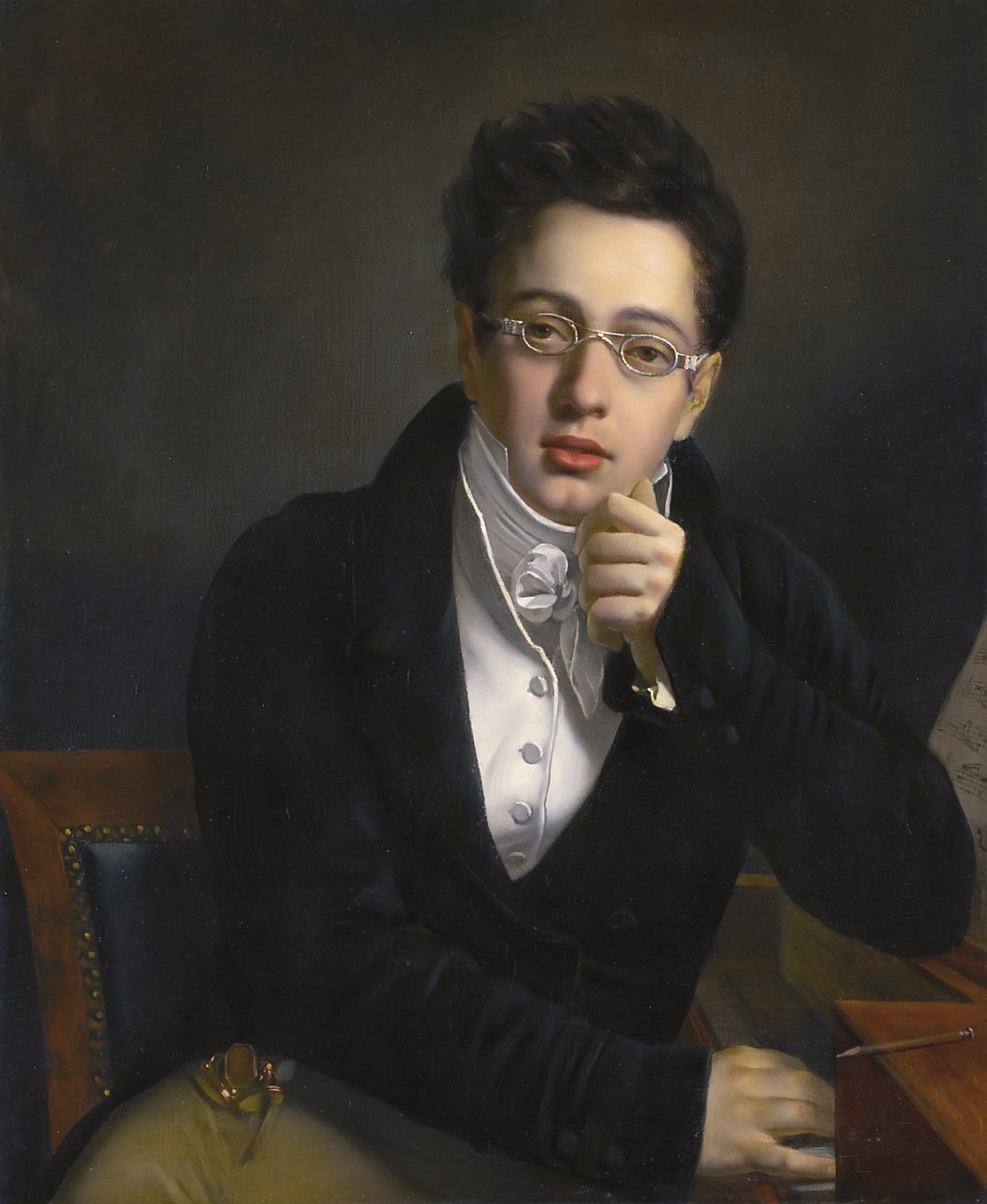
Possible portrait of the young Franz Schubert c. 1814, attributed to Josef Abel

The Piano Sonata in E major, D 459, is a work for solo piano, composed by Franz Schubert in August 1816. It was first published in 1843, after the composer's death, by Carl August Klemm in Leipzig, in a publication known as Fünf Klavierstücke (Five Piano Pieces).

In the first edition of the Deutsch catalogue all five pieces were grouped under the same number 459. Whether it is a single composition in 5 movements is a matter of contention. From the second edition of the Deutsch catalogue the three last pieces of the set were split off as D 459A, Drei Klavierstücke (Three Piano Pieces), with only the two first movements regarded as belonging to the same sonata, D 459.

In his introduction to the first edition of the five pieces, Klemm refers to them as compositions, not movements of the same composition. In the extant autograph of the first piece, Allegro moderato, Schubert however wrote Sonate on top of the page, and continues in the same manuscript with an incomplete version of the second piece, the first Scherzo. It is not known whether Klemm possessed another (completer) manuscript of this Scherzo, or is responsible for its completion in its published form. No other combinations of the pieces are known from extant autographs or contemporary copies. Apart from the first two pieces, only a fragment of the fifth piece, predating the first printed version, is extant.

D 506 has been suggested as a third and final movement of a sonata put together with the third D 459A piece (Allegro patetico) as first and the Adagio D 349 as second movement.

Andrea Lindmayr-Brandl follows Klemm in his assertion that he compiled the pieces for his 1843 publication from a number of different Schubert compositions. Lindmayer concludes that the work is "fragmentary", because Schubert had broken off the sonata at the close of the development section of the second movement.

== Movements ==
There are five movements:

1. Allegro moderato in E major, with a recapitulation in the subdominant
2. Scherzo: Allegro in E major
3. Adagio (or D 459A, movement I) in C major
4. Scherzo: Allegro – Trio: Più tardo (or D 459A, movement II) in A major (the recapitulation in this movement described by Daniel Coren.)
5. Allegro patetico (or D 459A, movement III) in E major

== Notes ==
Piano sonatas (2 hands) by Franz Schubert
Preceded by Sonata in C major (D. 279)	21 Sonatas numbering system No. 3	Succeeded by Sonata in A minor (D. 537)
Preceded by Sonata in C major (D. 279)	23 Sonatas numbering system No. 3	Succeeded by Sonata in E minor (D. 769A)
