= Piano Sonata in E-flat major, D 568 (Schubert) =

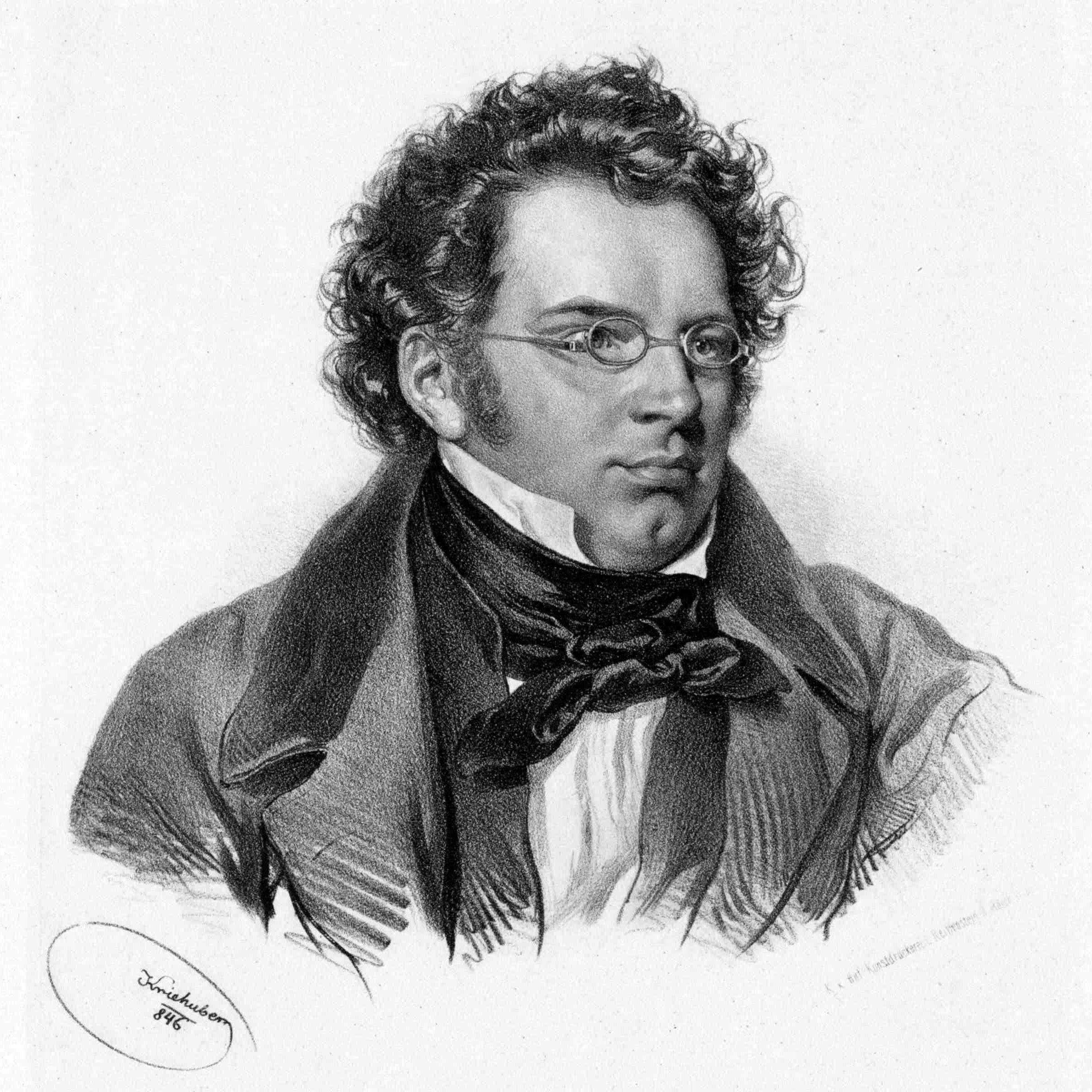
Franz Schubert by Josef Kriehuber (1846)

The Piano Sonata in E♭ major D 568 by Franz Schubert is a sonata for solo piano. It is a revision and completion of the Sonata in D♭ major D 568. The D♭ major version was composed in June 1817, while the E♭ major revision and completion, published in 1829 after Schubert's death as Op. posth. 122, dates from sometime around 1826.

== Music ==
I. Allegro moderato

II. Andante molto

III. Menuetto: Allegretto – Trio

IV. Allegro moderato
Performed by Paul Pitman

The sonata has four movements:

1. Allegro moderato (E♭ major)
2. Andante molto (G minor)
3. Menuetto: Allegretto – Trio (E♭ major)
4. Allegro moderato (E♭ major)

This sonata is a transposition and elaboration of the Piano Sonata in D♭, D. 567.

Daniel Coren summarized the nature of the recapitulation in the first movement of this sonata as "syncopated primary material".

== Sources ==
- Schubert, Franz. Klaviersonaten Band 1. Berlin: G. Henle Verlag.
- Gibbs, Christopher (1997). The Cambridge Companion to Schubert. Cambridge Companions to Music. Cambridge, England: Cambridge University Press.

Piano sonatas (2 hands) by Franz Schubert
Preceded by Sonata in A minor (D. 537)	AGA, Series 10 (15 sonatas); No. 7	Succeeded by Sonata in A minor (D. 784)
Preceded by Sonata in D♭ major (D. 568)	21 Sonatas numbering system No. 7 (v. 2)	Succeeded by Sonata in F♯ minor (D. 571)
Preceded by Sonata in D♭ major (D. 568)	Wiener Urtext Edition (21 Sonatas); No. 8	Succeeded by Sonata in F♯ minor (D. 571)
Preceded by Sonata in D♭ major (D. 568)	23 Sonatas numbering system No. 9	Succeeded by Sonata in F♯ minor (D. 571)
