= Piano Sonata in D major, D 850 (Schubert) =

1825 composition by Franz Schubert

Piano Sonata in D major
- Gasteiner
- by Franz Schubert
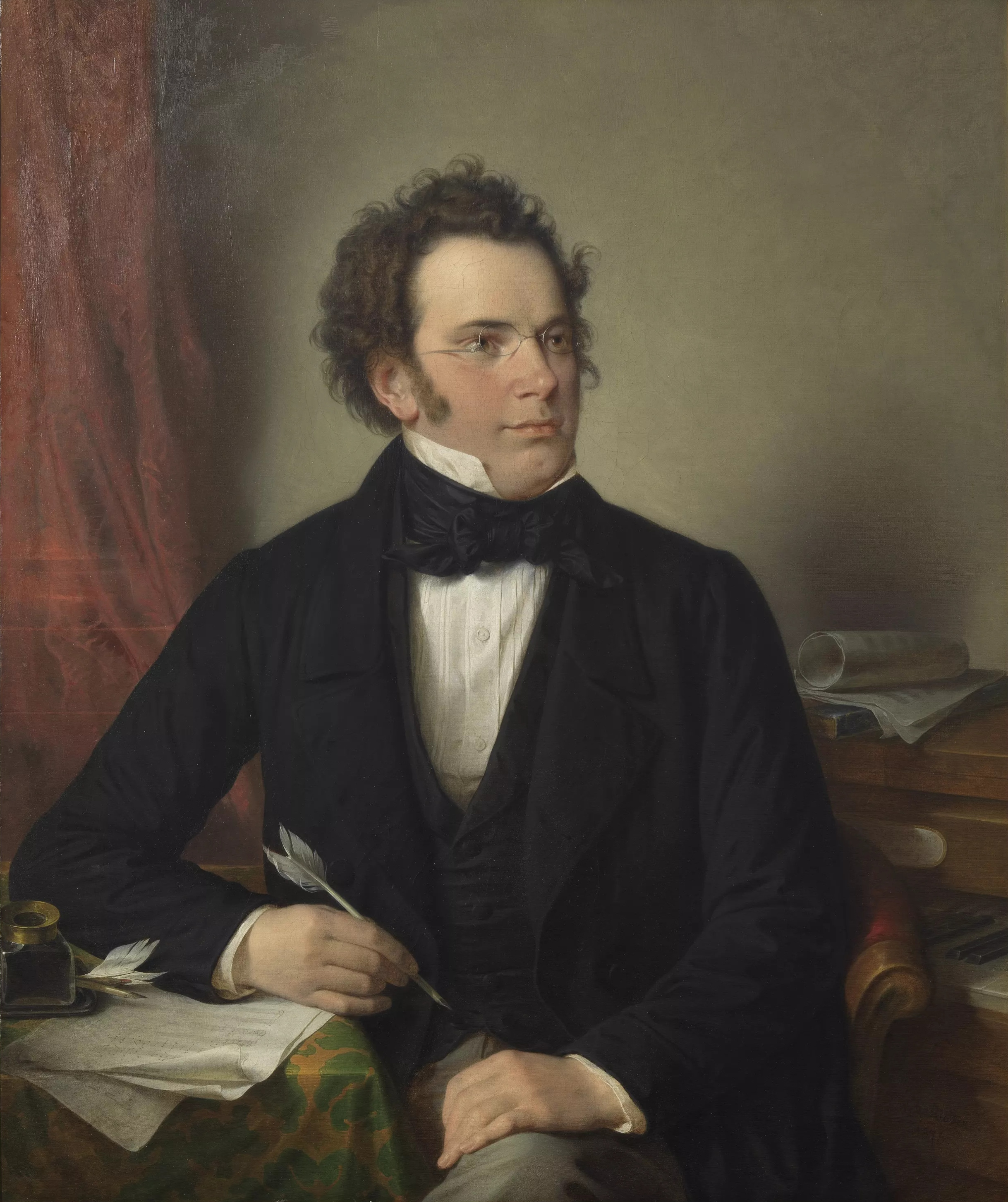
- 1875 portrait of Schubert, after an 1825 original
- Catalogue: D. 850
- Opus: 53
- Composed: August 1825, Bad Gastein
- Published: 1826/27
- Movements: 4
- Scoring: Solo piano

Franz Schubert's Piano Sonata in D major, Op. 53, D. 850, known as the Gasteiner, was written during August 1825 while the composer was staying in the spa town of Bad Gastein. A year later, it became only the second of his piano sonatas to be published.

== Music ==
The piano sonata has four movements:

1. Allegro vivace (D major)
2. Con moto (A major, ABABA form)
3. Scherzo: Allegro vivace – Trio (D major, Trio in G major)
4. Rondo: Allegro moderato (D major, ABACA form)

=== I. Allegro vivace ===
I. Allegro vivace

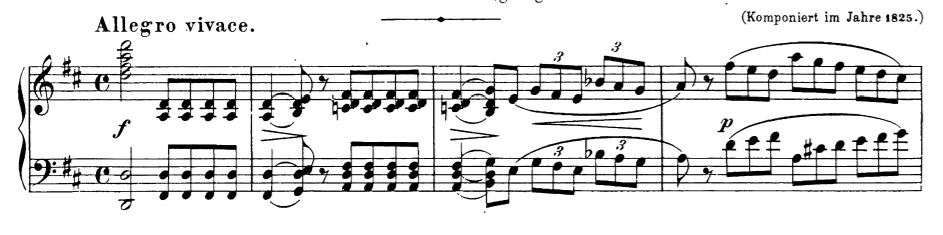
Opening bars of the first movement

The autograph has alla breve Allegro while the first edition (published during Schubert's lifetime and thus probably a revision) gives common-time Allegro vivace – this is uncharacteristically quick for a Schubert allegro, a marking he often qualified with moderato.

The first movement is unrelentingly energetic, ranging from ebullient to stormy to triumphant. A fanfare-like introduction introduces the primary thematic material featured in this movement and ultimately throughout the sonata. In a characteristic Schubertian gesture, this theme is immediately repeated in the minor – also typical is the modulation through remote keys as the exposition is spun out. The cheerful second subject, with its vacillating high-low pattern, is reminiscent of yodeling. This theme is also similar to the opening of the Lied Das Heimweh (homesickness), composed at the same time.

The development section features a grandiose chordal fanfare theme based on the first subject, also used in the coda closing the movement. Some of the most challenging writing in Schubert's solo piano oeuvre is found here, with the relentless triplets providing opportunity for virtuosic display.

=== II. Con moto ===
II. Con moto

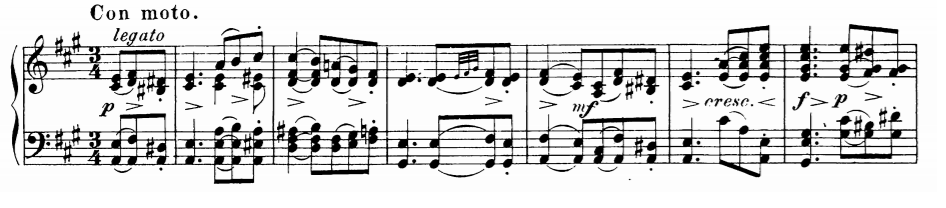
Opening bars of the second movement

Like the first movement, the second movement is unusual in its quickness, signified by the unique tempo marking. A driving pulse written into the phrasing augments an otherwise wistful melody in the A section. The bold, expansive B section features a novel syncopated dotted rhythm that produces stops and starts of momentum and is used to dramatic effect. Several recitatives and meditative digressions punctuate the piece, which has a sophisticated texture and inventive writing in general. The syncopated rhythm of theme B is merged with theme A for its final appearance, and the movement dies off with a brief and shadowy outro.

=== III. Scherzo: Allegro vivace – Trio ===
III. Scherzo: Allegro vivace - Trio

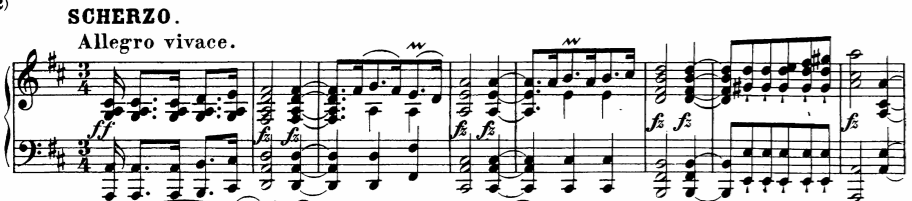
Opening bars of the third movement

In the athletic scherzo, Schubert expands a jaunty dotted-note idea to its limits, with thick chordal writing and frequent abrupt changes of register, texture, and key. Hemiola is used extensively – a strong 3/2 pulse pervades the 3/4 scherzo.

The stately trio, with its even, lyrical repeated chords and distant modulations, contrasts considerably with the kinetic music surrounding it.

=== IV. Rondo: Allegro moderato ===
IV. Rondo: Allegro moderato
All performed by Bernd Krueger

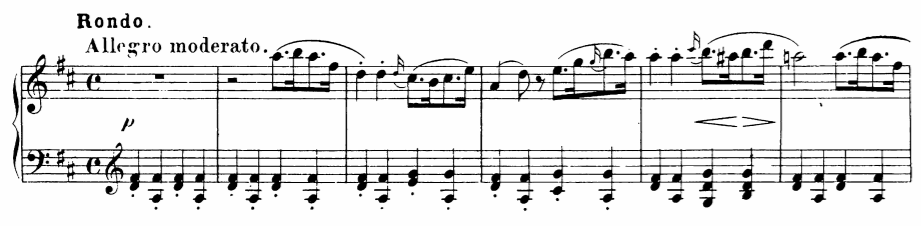
Opening bars of the fourth movement

The playful and innocent march-like rondo theme, repeated twice with increasing rhythmic subdivision and decoration, is punctuated by two contrasting episodes, each with their own stormy central sections. The B episode features quick scales passed between the hands as a simple staccato phrase is developed. The C episode features a lyrical repeated chord theme that digresses into a dramatic minor section. After the last highly ornamented statement of the rondo theme, a valedictory coda brings the work to a quiet and understated close.

The work takes approximately 40 minutes to perform, one of the longest and most ambitious of Schubert’s solo works, especially up to this point.

Piano sonatas (2 hands) by Franz Schubert
| Preceded by Sonata in A major (D. 664) | AGA, Series 10 (15 sonatas); No. 11 | Succeeded by Sonata in G major (D. 894) |
| Preceded by Sonata in A minor (D. 845) | 21 Sonatas numbering system No. 17 | Succeeded by Sonata in G major (D. 894) |
| Preceded by Sonata in A minor (D. 845) | 23 Sonatas numbering system No. 19 | Succeeded by Sonata in G major (D. 894) |
