= Piano Sonata in G major, D 894 (Schubert) =

Composition for piano by Franz Schubert

Piano Sonata in G major
- Fantasie
- by Franz Schubert
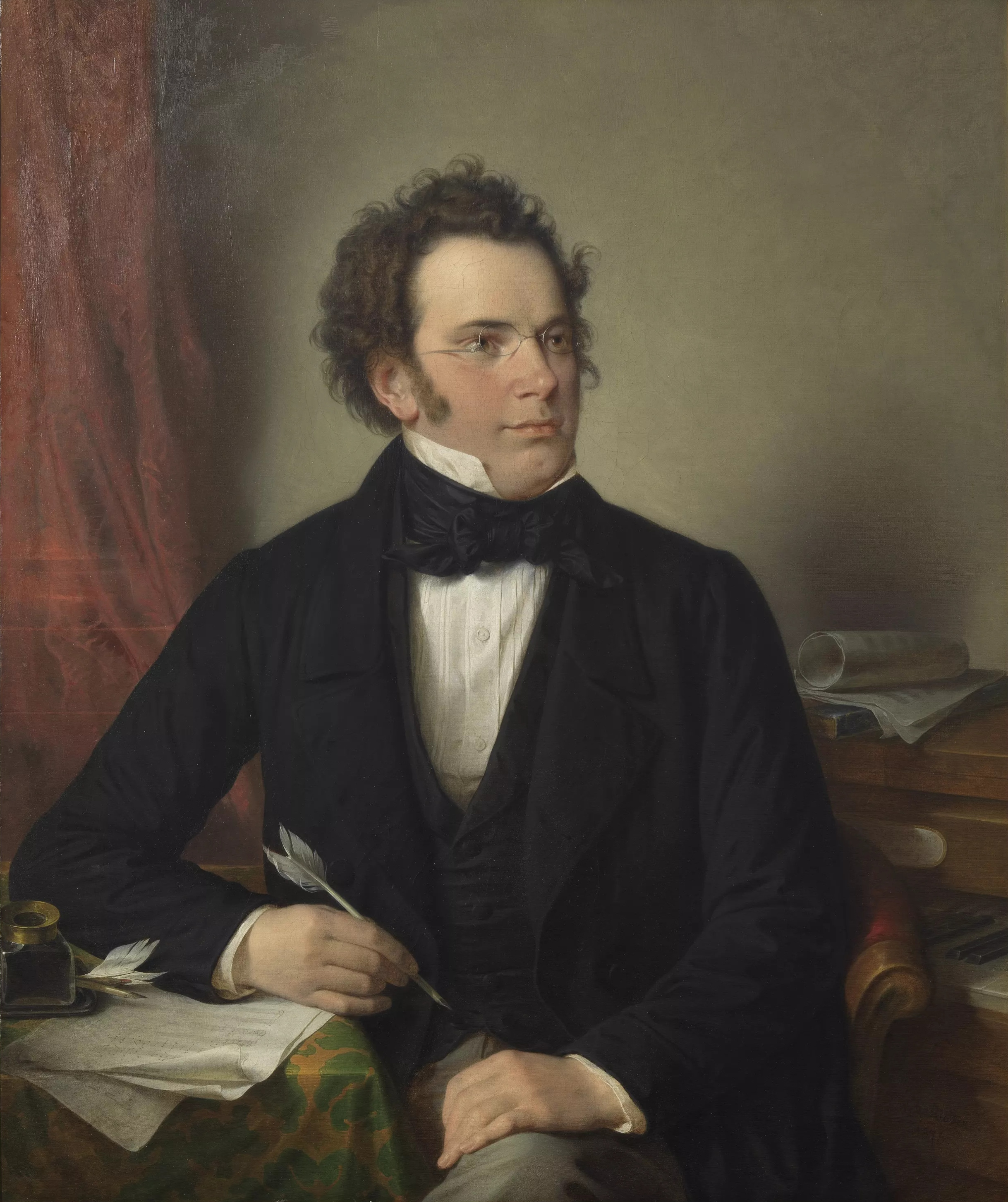
- 1875 portrait of Schubert, after an 1825 original
- Catalogue: D. 894
- Opus: 78
- Composed: October 1826
- Published: after October 1826
- Movements: 4
- Scoring: Solo piano

Franz Schubert's Piano Sonata in G major, Op. 78, D. 894 was completed in October 1826. The work is sometimes called the "Fantasie", a title which the publisher Tobias Haslinger, rather than Schubert, gave to the first movement of the work. It was the last of Schubert's sonatas published during his lifetime, and was later described by Robert Schumann as the "most perfect in form and conception" of any of Schubert's sonatas. A typical performance runs approximately 35 minutes.

The autograph manuscript of the sonata is preserved in the British Library.

== Movements ==
I. Molto moderato e cantabile

II. Andante

III. Menuetto: Allegro moderato – Trio

IV. Allegretto
Performed by Randolph Hokanson

The sonata consists of four movements:

1. Molto moderato e cantabile (G major, largely conforming to sonata form)
2. Andante (D major, with two trios, the first in B minor, the relative minor, and the second in the parallel minor, D minor)
3. Menuetto: Allegro moderato – Trio (B minor, trio in B major)
4. Allegretto (G major)

== Mood and character ==
The English pianist Imogen Cooper has described the G major sonata as "one of the rare completely serene sonatas that he wrote," adding, "Of course, as ever with him, there are contrasting passages which become stormy and a little bit dark, but the overall mood is one of peace and luminosity, in a way that the G Major string quartet, written a few months before, was most definitely not". She noted further that "the last movement has tremendous wit in it — and one or two moments of great poignancy, as if a cloud suddenly covered the sun, and then the sun comes out again".

Pianist Mark Taratushkin, in his analysis of this sonata, points out that the original concept for the second movement was quite different from the version known today. Evidence of this can be seen in the score that Schubert sent to his publisher. The original manuscript, which has survived and is currently digitized in the archive of the British Library, reveals that after completing the minuet, Schubert decided to rewrite the second movement. He tore out the original version from the manuscript and replaced it with the version we know today. The first and last pages of the original movement remain, containing the end of the first movement and the beginning of the third movement, respectively.

This peculiar aspect of the manuscript offers valuable insight into how the second movement might have originally sounded. The preserved fragment reveals a theme that is rhythmically characteristic of Schubert’s music, though it was ultimately replaced by a more dynamic orchestral episode in the final version. This change allowed for a greater contrast between the first two themes, which was crucial for the movement's structure and overall impact.

The third movement's opening theme is remarkably similar to the second theme of the first movement of Schubert's second Piano Trio both in rhythm and note progression.

Peter Pesic commented on Donald Francis Tovey's observation that Schubert used a "circle of sixths" series of key signatures in the fourth movement of this sonata, in the sequence G → E♭ → B = C♭ → G = A.

Pianists Sviatoslav Richter and Paul Lewis stated that this was their favourite Schubert sonata. The former is notable for his extremely slow interpretation of the first movement, and solemn account of the work, making the whole sonata usually last over 45 minutes in total. For Christian Zacharias this Schubert’s sonata belongs to beloved composition.

Piano sonatas (2 hands) by Franz Schubert
Preceded by Sonata in D major (D. 850)	AGA, Series 10 (15 sonatas); No. 12	Succeeded by Sonata in C minor (D. 958)
Preceded by Sonata in D major (D. 850)	21 Sonatas numbering system No. 18	Succeeded by Sonata in C minor (D. 958)
Preceded by Sonata in D major (D. 850)	23 Sonatas numbering system No. 20	Succeeded by Sonata in C minor (D. 958)
