= Piano Sonata in D-flat major, D 568 (Schubert) =

The Piano Sonata in D♭ major D 568 (also known under its former D number 567), composed in June 1817 by Franz Schubert, is an early version of his Piano Sonata in E♭ major D 568.

== Sources ==
- Gibbs, Christopher (1997). The Cambridge Companion to Schubert. Cambridge Companions to Music. Cambridge, England: Cambridge University Press.
- Free scores by Piano Sonata in D-flat major, D 568 (Schubert) at the International Music Score Library Project (IMSLP)

Piano sonatas (2 hands) by Franz Schubert
Preceded by Sonata in E minor (D 566)	21 Sonatas numbering system No. 7 (v. 1)	Succeeded by Sonata in E♭ major (D 568)
Preceded by Sonata in E minor (D 566)	Wiener Urtext Edition (21 Sonatas); No. 7	Succeeded by Sonata in E♭ major (D 568)
Preceded by Sonata in E minor (D 566)	23 Sonatas numbering system No. 8	Succeeded by Sonata in E♭ major (D 568)
