= Écossaises, D 421 (Schubert) =

Franz Schubert's Écossaises, D 421, are six short dances for solo piano:

1. A♭ major
2. F minor (ends in A ♭ major)
3. E♭ major
4. A♭ major
5. B major
6. D major (ends in B minor)

The pieces do not have tempo indications, and recordings have ranged from under 2 minutes to over 4 minutes in length for all six pieces.

Schubert wrote these Écossaises in May 1816 during a visit to Josef von Spaun's new home in the Landstraße suburb south-east of Vienna. During the visit, Schubert was locked into his room for a prank, which was that he was to finish a composition before being released. He produced these six Écossaises, and the following words were inscribed on the (now lost) title page: "Composed while confined to my room at Erdberg, May 1816."
