= Martino Tirimo =

Cypriot pianist

Martino Tirimo (born 19 December 1942) is a Cypriot classical pianist.

Born into a musical family in Larnaca, he began piano and violin lessons with his father, a distinguished conductor and violinist. He gave his first concert at the age of six, performed Haydn's Concerto in D at eight and when only twelve he conducted seven complete performances of Verdi's La Traviata, including soloists from La Scala, Milan.

At the age of sixteen he won the Franz Liszt Scholarship to the Royal Academy of Music in London, graduating with the highest honours, after which he completed his studies in Vienna. In 1971 and 1972 victories in the international piano competitions in Munich and Geneva launched his international career.

Tirimo has appeared with many of the world's leading orchestras, including the major British orchestras and those in Berlin, Cleveland, Dresden, Leipzig, Prague and Vienna. With the Dresden Philharmonic he directed several cycles of Beethoven's five piano concertos from the keyboard in various concert halls in Germany and the Royal Festival Hall, London.

== Repertoire and recordings ==
Tirimo's repertoire is enormous, including 80 concertos and nearly all the major solo works of the great composers, and he became a champion of the Dvorak Piano Concerto and of Michael Tippett's Piano Concerto, which he performed several times with the composer conducting, in Germany and the UK. Their recording of the work for Nimbus was released in 1991.

Among over 50 recordings are the two Chopin Concertos with the Philharmonia (Alto), the two Brahms Piano Concertos with the London Philharmonic (EMI) and a CD of Rachmaninoff's Concerto No. 2 and Paganini Rhapsody, which became one of EMI's best sellers and for which he received a Gold Disc in 1994 (sales of this disc in the UK alone topped 200,000 in 1993). He has also recorded the complete piano music of Debussy and Janáček.

Tirimo is particularly renowned for his Schubert interpretations and in 1975 became the first pianist to perform a truly complete cycle of the 21 Sonatas in public, with his own completions to the unfinished movements, at the Queen Elizabeth Hall.

His 1985 cycle at the Wigmore Hall was recorded by BBC Radio 3, and in 1996–97 he recorded the complete set for EMI, as well as editing the first complete edition, in three volumes, for Wiener Urtext Edition. The 8 CDs were released throughout 1997, the 200th anniversary of Schubert's birth, and in the same season he performed all of Schubert's major piano works in six concerts at the Wigmore Hall.

In 2006 he recorded the complete piano works of Mozart, at the Leipzig Gewandhaus, on 12 CDs.

In 2009 Tirimo embarked on several series devoted to Chopin's solo piano music and works for piano and orchestra. In 2010 this culminated in a series of 12 concerts at Kings Place, London, where Tirimo was joined by Polish musicians including Iwona Sobotka (soprano) and the Silesian String Quartet for a survey of Chopin's entire output.
