= Schubert Thematic Catalogue =

Numbered list of compositions by Schubert

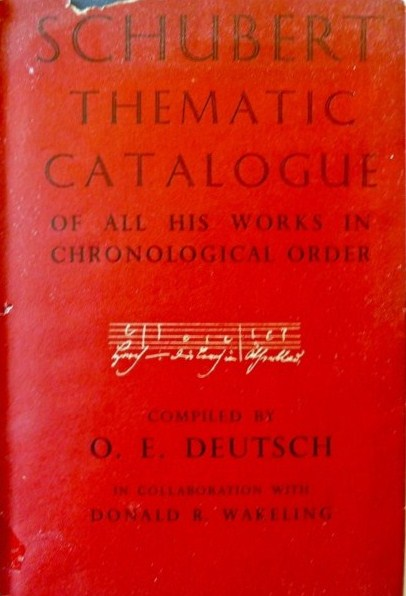
Deutsch Catalogue, first edition, 1951

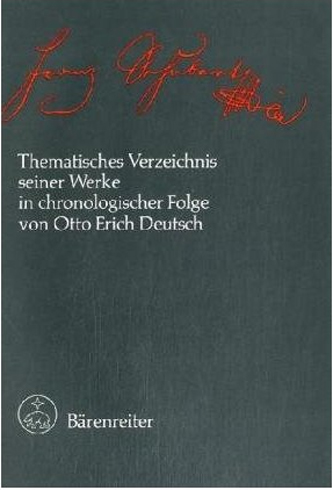
Deutsch-Verzeichnis 1978

Schubert: Thematic Catalogue of all his Works in Chronological Order, also known as the Deutsch catalogue, is a numbered list of all compositions by Franz Schubert compiled by Otto Erich Deutsch. Since its first publication in 1951, Deutsch (abbreviated as D or D.) numbers are used for the unique identification of Schubert's compositions.

== 1951 edition ==
The Deutsch catalogue was first published in London in 1951 by J. M. Dent & Sons, as Schubert: Thematic Catalogue of all his Works in Chronological Order, compiled by O. E. Deutsch, in collaboration with Donald R. Wakeling.

== 1978 edition: NSE VIII/4 ==
In 1978, as part VIII Supplement / Volume 4 of the New Schubert Edition (NSE), an updated version of the catalogue was published in German.

A few compositions that had been undated in the first edition received a new number (usually followed by a letter), e.g. D 993 was renumbered to D 2E.

== Later versions ==
The original 1951 edition (in English) was re-issued several times, for instance in the United States by W. W. Norton. The 1978 version, published by Bärenreiter, had a double objective: it was not only a list of Schubert's works as such, it was also the compendium of all scores published by that publisher in the New Schubert Edition.

=== New versions in English ===
In 1995 Dover Publications republished the 1951 edition, with updates derived from scholarship that had been published since 1951.

=== New versions in German ===
From 1983 compact versions of the catalogue appeared, edited by Werner Aderhold and others.

Changes to the numbering of Schubert's works were minor in these later editions.

== Sources ==
- (in German) Thematisches Verzeignis der im Druck erschienenen Compositionen von Franz Schubert. Vienna: Diabelli, 1852.
- (in German) Gustav Nottebohm. Thematisches Verzeignis der im Druck erschienenen Werke von F. Schubert. Vienna: Schreiber, 1874.
- Otto Erich Deutsch in collaboration with Donald R. Wakeling. Schubert: Thematic Catalogue of all his Works in Chronological Order. London: Dent — New York: W. W. Norton, 1951.
- Maurice J. E. Brown. "The Musician's Bookshelf. 'Schubert: Thematic Catalogue of all his Works in Chronological Order.' By Otto Erich Deutsch." in The Musical Times Vol. 92, No. 1300, pp. 264–266, June 1951.
- Otto Erich Deutsch. The Schubert Catalogue: Corrections and Additions. University of Michigan, 1953.
- Reinhard Van Hoorickx. "Franz Schubert (1797–1828) List of the Dances in Chronological Order" in Revue belge de Musicologie/Belgisch Tijdschrift voor Muziekwetenschap, Vol. 25, No. 1/4, pp. 68–97, 1971
- Reinhard Van Hoorickx. "Thematic Catalogue of Schubert's Works: New Additions, Corrections and Notes" in Revue belge de Musicologie/Belgisch Tijdschrift voor Muziekwetenschap, Vol. 28/30, pp. 136–171, 1974—1976.
- (in German) Otto Erich Deutsch, with revisions by Werner Aderhold and others. Franz Schubert, thematisches Verzeichnis seiner Werke in chronologischer Folge (New Schubert Edition Series VIII Supplement, Volume 4). Kassel: Bärenreiter, 1978. ISMN 9790006305148 — ISBN 9783761805718
- Robert Winter. "Cataloguing Schubert" in 19th Century Music, November 1979
- Eva Badura-Skoda and Peter Branscombe. Schubert Studies: Problems of Style and Chronology. Cambridge University Press, 1982.
- (in German) Otto Erich Deutsch, edited by Werner Aderhold, Walther Dürr, Arnold Feil. Franz Schubert: Werkverzeichnis — Der Kleine Deutsch. Kassel: Bärenreiter, 1983. ISBN 3-7618-3261-3 – ISBN 3-423-03261-8. (concise edition)
- Otto Erich Deutsch, The Schubert Thematic Catalogue. New York: Dover Publications, 1995. ISBN 0486286851 – ISBN 9780486286853
- Barry S. Brook, Richard J. Viano. Thematic Catalogues in Music: An Annotated Bibliography — second edition, pp. 409–413. Pendragon Press, 1997. ISBN 978-0-918728-86-9
- (in German) Werner Aderhold (ed.) Franz Schubert: Deutsch-Verzeichnis — Studienausgabe. Kassel: Bärenreiter, 2012. ISMN 9790006315864 — ISBN 9783761812587
