= List of compositions by Franz Schubert (undated) =

Franz Schubert's compositions of uncertain date of composition, that is, composed somewhere between 1810 and 1828, are mostly in the Deutsch catalogue (D) range D 966–992, and include:

- Instrumental works:
  - Valses Nobles, D 969
- Vocal music:
  - Sketches for an opera known as Sophie, D 982

== Table ==
=== Legend ===
Legend to the table
column		content
1	D '51	Deutsch number in the first version of the Deutsch catalogue (1951)
2	D utd	most recent (utd = up to date) Deutsch catalogue number; the basic collation of the list is according to these numbers – whether or not the possibility to adjust the sorting according to the content of other columns is available depends on the device with which the table is displayed.
3	Op. pbl	Opus number (Op.; p indicates Post. = posthumous) and date of first publication (pbl; between brackets; when there is more than one date the earlier dates indicate partial publications). The column sorts to Opus number, then (earliest of) the publication date(s)
4	AGA	Alte Gesamt-Ausgabe = Franz Schubert's Werke: Kritisch durchgesehene Gesammtausgabe. Indicates genre/instrumentation: Series I: Symphonien (Nos. 1-8) (Johannes Brahms, 1884); Series II: Overtüren und Andere Orchesterwerke (Johann Nepomuk Fuchs, 1886); Series III: Oktette (Nos. 1-3) and IV: Streichquintett (Eusebius Mandyczewski, 1889); Series V: Streichquartette (Nos. 1-15) (Joseph Hellmesberger and Eusebius Mandyczewski, 1890); Series VI: Trio für Streichinstrumente (Eusebius Mandyczewski, 1892); Series VII: Trios, Quartets and Quintets with Piano and VIII: Pianoforte und Ein Instrument (Ignaz Brüll, 1886); Series IX: Pianoforte zu vier Händen (Anton Door, 1888); Series X: Sonaten für Pianoforte (Julius Epstein, 1888); Series XI: Fantasie, Impromptus und andere Stücke für Pianoforte (Julius Epstein, 1888); Series XII: Tänze für Pianoforte (Nos. 1-31) (Julius Epstein, 1889); Series XIII: Messen (Nos. 1-7) (Eusebius Mandyczewski, 1887); Series XIV: Kleinere Kirchenmusikwerke (Nos. 1-22) (Eusebius Mandyczewski, 1888); Series XV: Dramatische Musik (Johann Nepomuk Fuchs, 1893); Series XVI: Werke für Männerchor (Nos. 1-46) (Eusebius Mandyczewski, 1891); Series XVII: Werke für gemischten Chor (Nos. 1-19) (Josef Gänsbacher, Eusebius Mandyczewski, 1892); Series XVIII: Werke für Drei und mehr Frauenstimmen mit Pianoforte-Begleitung (Nos. 1-6) (Josef Gänsbacher, Eusebius Mandyczewski, 1891); Series XIX: Kleine Gesangswerke (Nos. 1-36) (Josef Gänsbacher and Eusebius Mandyczewski, 1892); Series XX: Sämtliche einstimmige Lieder und Gesänge (Eusebius Mandyczewski, 1894-1895); Series XXI: Supplement (Eusebius Mandyczewski, 1897); 1. Instrumentalmusik No. 1-5; 2. Instrumentalmusik No. 6-13; 3. Instrumentalmusik No. 14-; 4. Gesangsmusik; Series XXII: Revisionsbericht
5	NSA	NGA/NSA/NSE = New Schubert Edition, also indicates genre/instrumentation: Series I: Church Music; Series II: Stage Works; Series III: Part Songs; Series IV: Lieder; Series V: Orchestral Works; Series VI: Chamber Music; 1. Octet and Nonet; 2. String Quintet; 3. String Quartets I; 4. String Quartets II; 5. String Quartets III; 6. String Trios; 7. Works for Piano and several instruments; 8. Works for Piano and one instrument; 9. Dances for several instruments; Series VII: Piano Music; 1. Works for Piano Four Hands; 2. Works for Piano Two Hands; Series VIII: Supplement, 2. Schubert's Studies
6	Name	unique name, with, if available, a link to the relevant encyclopedia article; sorts by name with initial definite ("Der", "Die", "Das", ...) or indefinite ("Ein", "A", ...) articles, and numbers, moved after the expression they qualify: e.g. "Die Hoffnung, ..." sorts as "Hoffnung, Die, ..." – "Thirty Minuets ..." sorts as "Minuets, 30, ...".
7	Key / incipit	incipit mostly for songs (linking to lyrics and their translation, for instance at The LiederNet Archive, when available), other compositions by key, except for Schubert's stage works: type of composition in brackets.
8	Date	(presumed) date of composition, or, for copies and arrangements, date of Schubert's autograph. Sorts to earliest possible date of completion, unlike the chronology of the Deutsch catalogue that generally collates according to earliest date associated with the composition: e.g. Schubert started the composition of his 3rd String Quartet on 19 November 1812 and completed it on 21 February 1813 – in the Deutsch catalogue the composition is grouped with other compositions from 1812: when using the sort function of the 8th column the composition is grouped with compositions completed in 1813
9	Additional info	may include: Information about the text (lyrics, libretto) of vocal compositions: e.g., "Text by [text author]", "Text: [standard lyrics]", "... from [literary work]"; "other settings: D ..." indicates Schubert's other settings of the same text; for fields starting with "Text ..." this column sorts by text author (last name, first name—or pen name when such name is more established), then incipit of the lyrics (alternatively, when the incipit is rarely used, title of the work); Information about the authenticity of the composition: the work is without doubt Schubert's unless when marked as "Doubtful", "Spurious?" or "Spurious" (in the last case columns 3–8 give no further information about the composition); Forces needed for performance ("For ..."): may be omitted when the type of composition makes the instrumentation clear (e.g. String Quartet → two violins, viola and cello), and, for vocal music, when the setting is for voice and piano; "s", "a", "t" and "b" refer to a single soprano, alto, tenor and bass singer respectively, while "S", "A", "T" and "B" to choral parts for the same types of singers (see SATB).; Specifications regarding movements (e.g. "Allegro – Minuet – Rondo") or sections (e.g. "No. 1 ..."); Information about the completeness of the extant work: the work is considered complete as extant unless when marked "Sketch", "Incomplete", "Unfinished", "Fragment" or "Lost"; Information about versions (e.g. "Two versions: ...")

=== List ===
Compositions by Franz Schubert listed in the Deutsch catalogue for unknown date of composition
D '51	D utd	Op. pbl	AGA	NSA	Name	Key / incipit	Date	Additional info
966	11							See D 11 No. 3
	966B			V, 6 No. 8	Orchestral piece, D 966B	A major	1820 or later	Sketch
968	968	(1888)	IX, 3 No. 29	VII/1, 1 No. 7	Sonatina, D 968	C major – A minor	1815–1819?	For piano duet; Allegro moderato – Andante
603	968A	82p,2 (1860)	IX, 2 No. 18	VII/1, 1 No. 8	Introduction, Variations and Finale	B♭ major	?	For piano duet
886	968B	121p (1829)	IX, 1 No. 6	VII/1, 4	Deux Marches caractéristiques	C major	spring 1826?	For piano duet
969	969	77 (1827)	XII; No. 6	VII/2, 7a	12 Valses nobles	Various keys	before 22/1/1827	For piano
970	970	(1889)	XII; No. 13	VII/2, 6	Six Ländler, D 970, a.k.a. German Dances	Various keys	?	For piano; No. 2 near-identical to D 145 No. 7
971	971	(1823)	XII; No. 14	VII/2, 7a	Three German Dances, D 971	Various keys	before 10/1/1823	For piano
972	972	(1889)	XII; No. 15	VII/2, 6	Three German Dances, D 972	Various keys	before April 1817?	For piano; No. 3 reused in D 552
973	973	(1889)	XII; No. 16	VII/2, 6	Three German Dances, D 973	Various keys	?	For piano
974	974	(1889)	XII; No. 17	VII/2, 6	Two German Dances, D 974	Various keys	?	For piano
975	975	(1889)	XII; No. 20	VII/2, 6	German Dance, D 975	D major	?	For piano
976	976	(1825)	XII; No. 22	VII/2, 7a	Cotillon	E♭ major	before 29/12/1825	For piano
977	977	(1889)	XII; No. 26	VII/2, 6	Eight Écossaises, D 977	Various keys	?	For piano
978	978	(1825)		VII/2, 7a	Waltz, D 978	A♭ major	before 29/12/1825	For piano
979	979	(1826)		VII/2, 7a	Waltz, D 979	G major	before 23/12/1826	For piano
980	980	(1826)		VII/2, 7a	Two Waltzes, D 980	Various keys	before 23/12/1826	For piano
640	980A			VII/2, 6	Two Dances, D 980A	Various keys	?	For piano; Sketches
679	980B	(1925)		VII/2, 6	Two Ländler, D 980B	E♭ major	?	For piano
680	980C	(1930)		VII/2, 6	Two Ländler, D 980C	D♭ major	?	For piano; Fragments
	980D	(1828)		VII/2, 7a	Waltz, D 980D, a.k.a. Krähwinkler Tanz	C major	before 26/1/1828	For piano
	980E			VII/2, 6	Two Dances, D 980E	Various keys	1818 or later	For piano(?); Sketches
	980F			VII/2, 6	March, D 980F	G major	?	For piano; Arr. of a lost march for orchestra?
981	981				Der Minnesänger	(Singspiel)	?	Text by Kotzebue?; Lost
982	982			II, 16	Sketches for an opera a.k.a. Sophie	(Opera)	Sep.–Oct. 1820	For satb and orchestra; Nos. 1–3 (No. 3 partly reused in D 796 No. 7)
983; No. 1	983	17,1 (1823)	XVI; No. 20	III, 4 No. 48	Jünglingswonne	So lang im deutschen Eichentale	before 9/10/1823	Text by Matthisson; For ttbb
983; No. 2	983A	17,2 (1823)	XVI; No. 21	III, 4 No. 49	Liebe	Liebe rauscht der Silberbach	before 9/10/1823	Text by Schiller, from "Der Triumph der Liebe": stanza 25; Other: D 55, 61, 62, 63, 64; For ttbb
983; No. 3	983B	17,3 (1823)	XVI; No. 22	III, 4 No. 50	Zum Rundetanz	Auf! es dunkelt; silbern funkelt	before 9/10/1823	Text by Salis-Seewis (other setting: D Anh. I/18); For ttbb
983; No. 4	983C	17,4 (1823)	XVI; No. 23	III, 4 No. 51	Die Nacht, D 983C	Wie schön bist du, freundliche Stille	before 9/10/1823	Text by Krummacher(?); For ttbb
984	984	169p (1865)		III, 3 Anh. II No. 7	Der Wintertag a.k.a. Geburtstaglied	In schöner heller Winterzeit	1821 or later?	For ttbb and piano; Fragment: piano part lost
985	985	112p,1 (1829)	XVII; No. 6	III, 2a No. 4	Gott im Ungewitter	Du Schrecklicher, wer kann vor dir und deinem Donner stehn?	?	Text by Uz; For satb and piano
986	986	112p,2 (1829)	XVII; No. 7	III, 2a No. 5	Gott der Weltschöpfer	Zu Gott, zu Gott flieg auf	?	Text by Uz; For satb and piano
988	988	(1873)	XIX; No. 26	III, 4 No. 61; VIII, 2 No. 30	Liebe säuseln die Blätter	Liebe säuseln die Blätter	?	Text by Hölty; Canon for three voices
	988A			III, 3 Anh. II No. 8	Accompaniment part	B♭ major	1821 or later	For piano, as accompaniment for a vocal composition
990	990	(1853)		IV, 14	Der Graf von Habsburg	Zu Aachen in seiner Kaiserpracht	1815–1820	Text by Schiller
990	990A	(1853)		IV, 14	Kaiser Maximilian auf der Martinswand [in Tirol]	Hinauf! hinauf! in Sprung und Lauf	1815–1820	Text by Collin, H. J.
582	990B			IV, 14	Augenblicke im Elysium	Vor der in Ehrfurcht all mein Wesen kniet	?	Text by Schober; Music lost
868	990C	130p (1830)	XX, 8 No. 513	IV, 14	Das Echo	Herzliebe gute Mutter, o grolle nicht mit mir	?	Text by Castelli
	990D			IV, 14	Die Schiffende	Sie wankt dahin! Die Abendwinde spielen	?	Text by Hölty; Music lost
	990E			IV, 4 IV, 11	L'incanto degli occhi	Da voi, cari lumi	1813–1816?	Text by Metastasio, from Attilio Regolo II (other version: D 902 No. 1); Aria for s
	990F			IV, 11	Ombre amene a.k.a. La serenata	Ombre amene	1813–1816?	Text by Metastasio; Aria for s; Formerly misidentified as an early setting of Il traditor deluso, D 902 No. 2
991	323				O so laßt euch froh begrüssen	O so laßt euch froh begrüssen		Text by Schiller; Last part of D 323
992	383							See D 383

== Sources ==
Multi-volume editions, websites and catalogues

- Alte Gesamt-Ausgabe (AGA) = Franz Schubert's Works: Schubert, Franz (1884–1897). Johannes Brahms; Ignaz Brüll; Anton Door; Julius Epstein; Johann Nepomuk Fuchs; Josef Gänsbacher; Joseph Hellmesberger Sr.; Eusebius Mandyczewski (eds.). Franz Schubert's Werke: Kritisch durchgesehene Gesammtausgabe (in German). Leipzig: Breitkopf & Härtel. Reprints of several volumes by Kalmus and Dover Publications; Franz Schubert's Werke (Series I–XIX and XXI), Series XX, Revisionsbericht: Scores at the International Music Score Library Project
- Deutsch catalogue (D) = Schubert Thematic Catalogue:
  - Deutsch, Otto Erich; et al. (Donald R. Wakeling) (1951). Schubert: Thematic Catalogue of all his Works in Chronological Order (1st ed.). London: Dent. 1995 reprint, with errata correction: Deutsch, Otto Erich; et al. (Donald R. Wakeling) (1995). The Schubert Thematic Catalogue (Dover ed.). Mineola, N.Y.: Dover Publications. ISBN 0486286851.
  - Deutsch, Otto Erich (1978). Walther Dürr; Arnold Feil; Christa Landon [in German]; Werner Aderhold (eds.). Franz Schubert: Thematisches Verzeichnis seiner Werke in chronologischer Folge. New Schubert Edition (in German). Kassel: Bärenreiter. ISBN 9783761805718. ISMN 9790006305148.
    - Series VIII (Supplement)
    - Volume 4
- Hoboken catalogue (Hob.): "Joseph Haydn (1732–1809): Werke sortiert nach Hob (Hoboken-Verzeichnis, 1957-78)" (in German). Kaiserslautern: Klassika.
- Köchel catalogue (K.): "Wolfgang Amadeus Mozart (1756–1791): Werke sortiert nach KV^{6} (Köchel-Verzeichnis, 6. Auflage, 1964)" (in German). Kaiserslautern: Klassika.
- Neue Schubert-Ausgabe (NSA) = New Schubert Edition:
  - NSA scores: Schubert, Franz (1968–2019). International Schubert Association (Tübingen) (ed.). Franz Schubert (1797–1828): New Edition of the Complete Works (in German). Kassel: Bärenreiter. [over 80 volumes in eight series] Individual volumes:
    - NSA II, 15: Schubert, Franz; Neumann, Johann Philipp (2008). Jahrmärker, Manuela; Aigner, Thomas (eds.). Sacontala. New Schubert Edition (in German). Kassel: Bärenreiter. ISMN 9790006497294.
      - Series II (Stage Works), Vol. 15
    - NSA VIII, 4: See above Deutsch (1978)
  - NSA website: "New Schubert Edition". Tübingen: International Schubert Association.
- Schubert Online: "www.schubert-online.at: Schubert music manuscripts, first and early editions online". Vienna: Austrian Academy of Sciences (ÖAW).
- The LiederNet Archive: Ezust, Emily; et al. (LiederNet contributors). "Composer: Franz Peter Schubert (1797 - 1828)". Ontario: LiederNet Corporation.

Other

- Badura-Skoda, Eva; Branscombe, Peter, eds. (2008). Schubert Studies: Problems of Style and Chronology. Cambridge University Press. ISBN 0521088720.
  - Walther Dürr "Schubert's Songs and Their Poetry" pp. 1–24
  - Rufus Hallmark "Schubert's 'Auf dem Strom'" pp. 25–46
  - Elaine Brody "Schubert and Sulzer Revisited" pp. 47–60
  - Marius Flothuis "Schubert Revises Schubert" pp. 61–84
  - Elizabeth Norman McKay "Schubert as Composer of Operas" pp. 85–104
  - Peter Branscombe "Schubert and the Melodrama" pp. 105–142
  - Christoph Wolff "Schubert's 'Der Tod und dad Mädchen'" pp. 143–172
  - Peter Gülke on String Quintet D 956 pp. 173–186
  - Paul Badura-Skoda on Schubert's 'Great' C major Symphony pp. 187–208
  - Robert Winter "Paper Studies and the Future of Schubert Research" pp. 209–276
  - Eva Badura-Skoda "The Chronology of Schubert's Piano Trios" pp. 277–296
  - Reinhard Van Hoorickx "The Chronology of Schubert's Fragments and Sketches" pp. 297–326
  - Arnold Feil "Rhythm in Schubert" pp. 327–346
  - Alexander Weinmann on Leopold Puschl and Schubert's sojourn in Zseliz pp. 347–356
- Elsholz, Gunter (1982). Vogel, Reimut (ed.). Franz Schubert: Sinfonie in E-Dur 1825. Stuttgart: Goldoni. ISBN 3922044050. OCLC 987719669.
- Hilmar, Ernst; Jestremski, Margret, eds. (2004). Schubert-Enzyklopädie (in German). Vol. 1. Introduction by Alfred Brendel. Tutzing: Hans Schneider. ISBN 3795211557.
- Keefe, Simon P., ed. (2006). Mozart Studies. Cambridge University Press. ISBN 0521851025.
- Kube, Michael (2009). "Franz Schuberts Deutsche Trauermesse (D 621) als Problem der Text- und Stilkritik". In Mitterauer, Gertraud; Müller, Ulrich; Springeth, Margarete; Vitzthum, Verena (eds.). Was ist Textkritik?: Zur Geschichte und Relevanz eines Zentralbegriffs der Editionswissenschaft (in German). Walter de Gruyter. pp. 129–140. ISBN 3484970782.
- Mozart, Wolfgang Amadeus; Haydn, Joseph; Haydn, Michael (2008). Kircher, Armin (ed.). Chorbuch Mozart • Haydn VII: Kanonsammlung [Choral Collection Mozart • Haydn, Vol. VII: Canon Collection] (in German, Latin, English, and Italian). Stuttgart: Carus-Verlag. OCLC 274222567.
- Newbould, Brian (1999). Schubert: The Music and the Man. University of California Press. ISBN 0520219570.
- Reed, John (1997). The Schubert Song Companion. Manchester University Press. ISBN 1901341003.
- Van Hoorickx, Reinhard (1971). "Franz Schubert (1797–1828) List of the Dances in Chronological Order". Revue belge de Musicologie / Belgisch Tijdschrift voor Muziekwetenschap. 25 (1). Belgian Musicological Society: 68–97. doi:10.2307/3686180. ISSN 0771-6788. JSTOR 3686180.
- Van Hoorickx, Reinhard (1974–1976). "Thematic Catalogue of Schubert's Works: New Additions, Corrections and Notes". Revue belge de Musicologie / Belgisch Tijdschrift voor Muziekwetenschap. 28–30. Belgian Musicological Society: 136–171. doi:10.2307/3686053. ISSN 0771-6788. JSTOR 3686053.
