= Symphony, D 2B (Schubert) =

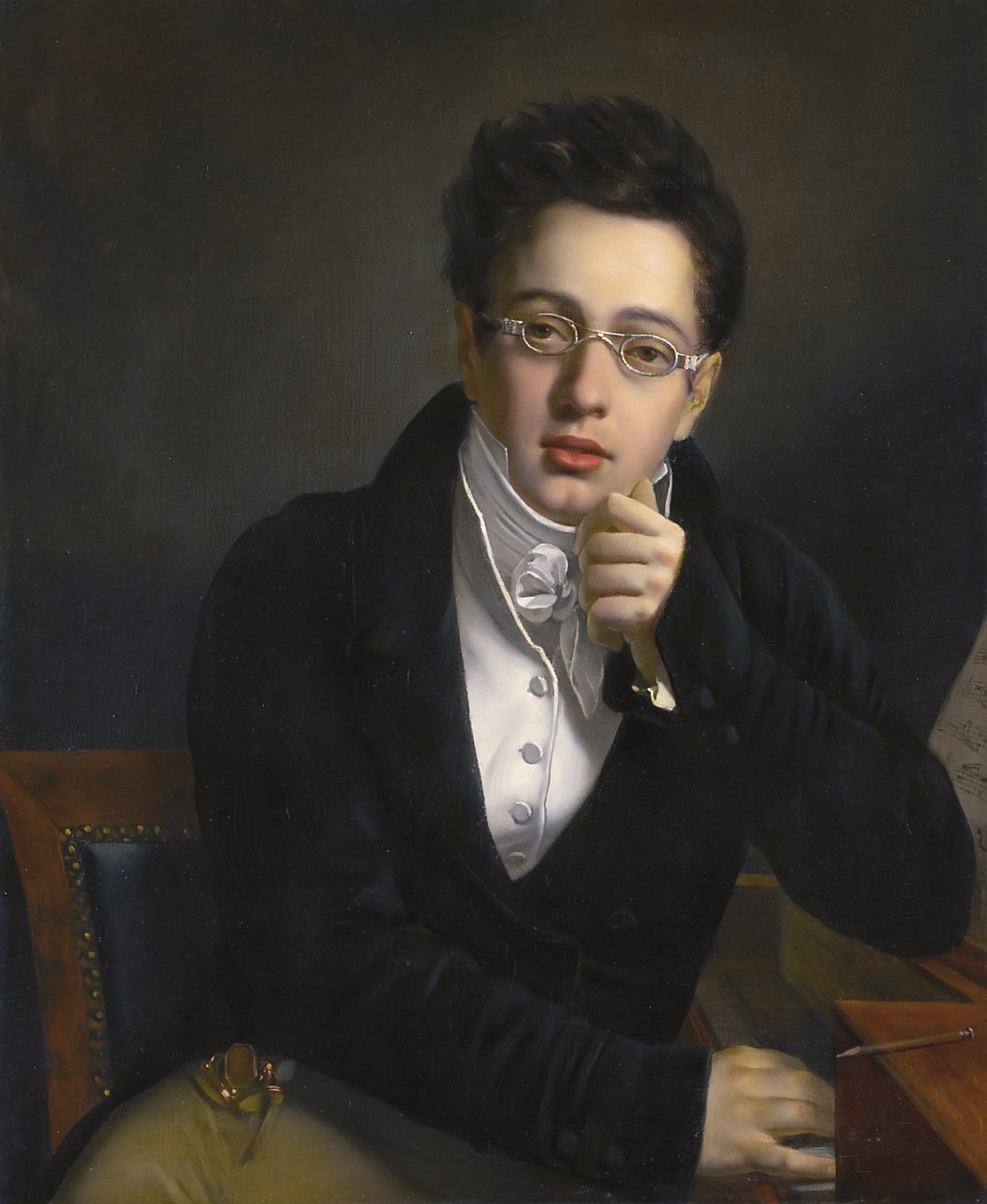
Possible portrait of the young Franz Schubert c. 1814, attributed to Josef Abel

Schubert's Symphony in D major, D 2B/997, is an unfinished work that survives in an incomplete 30-bar orchestral score. The sketch includes the whole slow introduction and the first theme of the Allegro before breaking off. It is one of Schubert's six unfinished symphonies. It was begun in 1811, when Schubert was fourteen years old, but it is unclear exactly how much he wrote before he abandoned the symphony (despite the fact that he would live another seventeen years). Its instrumentation is for the standard early Schubertian and classical orchestra, with the addition of trombones.

Schubert authority, conductor, and composer Brian Newbould suggests that the piece was modelled on Ludwig van Beethoven's second symphony. Despite Beethoven not including trombones in that symphony, Schubert included trombones in this incomplete work. Newbould states that the presence of trombones does not fit well with early Schubert's orchestral style and notes that they "have nothing special to contribute. Nor is the youngster sure how to notate their part. ... Perhaps he was merely obeying one of those headstrong impulses that impel the young to run before they can walk." Nonetheless, the way Schubert uses the trombones in D 2B indicates that he already knew what their function was in a Classical orchestra.
