= Lazarus (Schubert) =

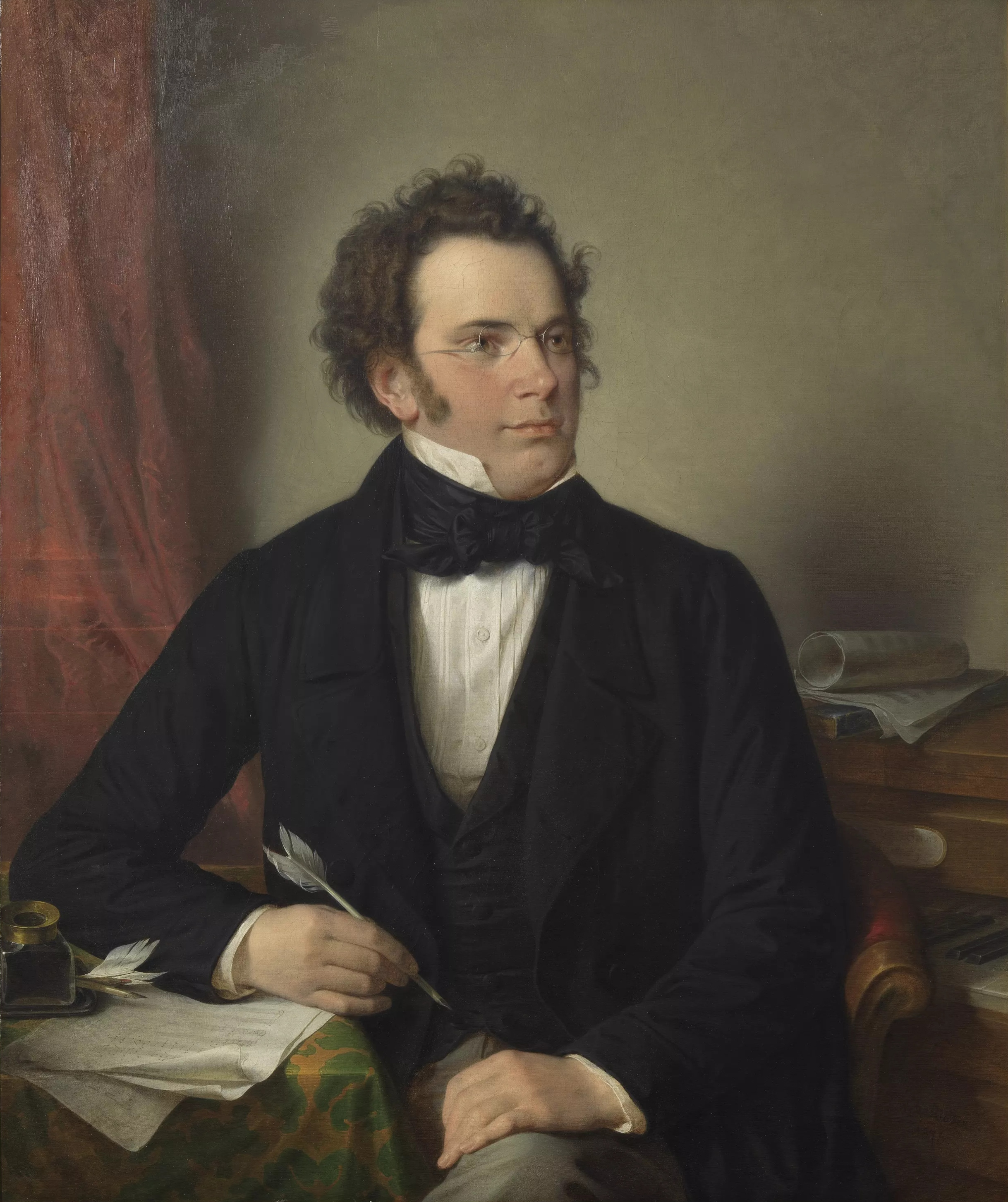
Franz Schubert

Lazarus or Die Feier der Auferstehung, D 689, is an unfinished 1820 oratorio by Franz Schubert on a libretto by August Hermann Niemeyer. Intended to be in three acts, only act 1 with twenty-one numbers, and eight numbers from act 2 are extant.

== Structure ==
The work is for three sopranos, two tenors, bass, mixed choir and orchestra.

Act 1

1. Introduktion
2. Hier laßt mich ruhn die letzte Stunde
3. Noch einen Augenblick?
4. Trübe nicht mit Klagen seine Seele
5. Steh' im letzten Kampf dem Müden
6. Voll Friede, ja, voll Fried' ist die Seele
7. Kalter Schweiß rinnt von der Stirn
8. Willkommen, mein Nathanael
9. Wenn ich ihm nachgerungen habe
10. Nathanael, bewundern kann ich dich
11. O Martha, o Martha, bliebst du stiller
12. Der Trost begleite dich hinüber
13. Wenn nun mit tausendfachen Qualen
14. Gottes Liebe, du bist deine Zuversicht
15. In der Leiden bängster Nacht
16. Ach, so find' ich ihn noch
17. Jemina, Tochter der Auferstehung
18. So schlummert auf Rosen
19. Nun entflog auf schnellen Schwingen
20. So war mir, Lazarus
21. O Barmherziger, o verlass ihn nicht

Act 2

1. Introduktion
2. Wo bin ich?
3. Schon bereitet ihr Gräber
4. Wess ist der Klage Stimme
5. So weile hier, mein Freund
6. Sanft und still
7. So legt ihn in die Blumen
8. Wecke sie nicht

== Roles ==
- Maria (soprano)
- Martha (soprano)
- Jemina (soprano)
- Lazarus (tenor)
- Nathanael (tenor)
- Ein Jüngling (tenor)
- Simon Peter (bass)

== Recordings ==
- 1978 – Carola Nossek, Ursula Reinhardt-Kiss, Ingeborg Springer, Eberhard Büchner, Horit Gebhardt. Staatskapelle Berlin Dietrich Knothe recorded in the Christuskirche, Berlin Berlin Classics 94452BC; reissued 1 CD Brilliant Classics
- 1981 – (also Mass No. 2 in G, D 167), Theodor Guschlbauer Warner Apex 2008
- 1983 – Edith Mathis, Wulkopf, Schwarz, Hollweg, Laubenthal, Hermann Prey conducted Gabriel Chmura, Orfeo 2LP
- 1983 - Lucia Popp, Robert Tear, Helen Donath, Maria Venuti, Josef Protschka, Dietrich Fischer-Dieskau, Chor Des Bayerischen Rundfunks, Symphonie-Orchester Des Bayerischen Rundfunks, Wolfgang Sawallisch, EMI Classics
- 1996 – completed by Edison Denisov. Rubens, Nylund, Nold, Weir. Bach Collegium Stuttgart, Helmuth Rilling Hanssler 1996, also reissued 2 CD Brilliant Classics 99969
- 1997 – Concentus Musicus Wien, Dorothea Röschmann, soprano; Ľuba Orgonášová, soprano; Elisabeth von Magnus, mezzo-soprano; Herbert Lippert, tenor; Reinaldo Macias, tenor; Raimund Nolte, baritone. Arnold Schoenberg Choir, conductor Nikolaus Harnoncourt Classics
- 2013 – Sarah Wegener, Johanna Winkel, Sophie Harmsen, Andreas Weller, Kammerchor Stuttgart, Hofkapelle Stuttgart, Frieder Bernius 1CD Carus

== Sources ==
- New Schubert Edition, Series II: Stage Works, Vol.10 – Lazarus oder die Feier der Auferstehung D 689: Fragment eines religiösen Dramas in 3 Akten. Edited by Reinhold Kubik. 1987. ISMN 9790006472215
