= Sonatas, duos and fantasies by Franz Schubert =

Musical works

Sonatas, duos and fantasies by Franz Schubert include all works for solo piano by Franz Schubert, except separate dances. They also include a number of works for two players: piano four hands, or piano and a string instrument (violin, arpeggione).

== Sonatas for piano solo ==
Twenty-four extant sonatas and sonata fragments are listed in the 1978 version of the Deutsch catalogue:

1. D. 154, Piano Sonata in E major (1815, fragment; similarity with the first movement of the Piano Sonata in E major, D. 157)
  1. Allegro (fragment)
2. D. 157, Piano Sonata in E major (1815, unfinished – first three movements are extant)
  1. Allegro ma non troppo
  2. Andante
  3. Menuetto. Allegro vivace – Trio
3. D. 279, Piano Sonata in C major (1815, unfinished – first three movements are extant; the Allegretto in C major, D. 346 fragment is probably the fourth movement)
  1. Allegro moderato
  2. Andante
  3. Menuetto. Allegro vivace – Trio
  4. Allegretto (D. 346, fragment)
4. D. 459, Piano Sonata in E major (1816, in 2 movements; also paired with D. 459A to have a five movement sonata or five piano pieces "Fünf Klavierstücke")
  1. Allegro moderato
  2. Scherzo. Allegro
5. D. 459A, Three piano pieces "Drei Klavierstücke" (1816?, also paired with D. 459 to have a five movement sonata or five piano pieces "Fünf Klavierstücke"
  3. Adagio
  4. Scherzo. Allegro – Trio. Più tardo
  5. Allegro patetico
6. D. 537, Piano Sonata in A minor (1817, first published as Op. posth. 164)
  1. Allegro ma non troppo
  2. Allegretto quasi andantino
  3. Allegro vivace
7. D. 557, Piano Sonata in A♭ major (1817; there is not complete certainty that the third movement, in E♭ major, is the Finale of the work)
  1. Allegro moderato
  2. Andante
  3. Allegro
8. D. 566, Piano Sonata in E minor (1817, unfinished? – first three movements are extant; the Rondo in E major, D. 506 is probably the fourth movement)
  1. Moderato
  2. Allegretto
  3. Scherzo. Allegro vivace – Trio
  4. Rondo. Allegretto (D. 506)
9. D. 568, Piano Sonata in D♭ major/E♭ major (1817, 2 versions; for the 1st version, the Scherzo in D♭ major, D. 593 No. 2 possibly constitutes the third movement; the last movement is a fragment; NSA also appends an amended first movement from the 1st version; 2nd version first published as Op. posth. 122)
  - 1st version, in D♭ major [formerly D. 567]
    1. Allegro moderato
    2. Andante molto
    3. Scherzo. Allegro moderato – Trio (D. 593 No. 2)
    4. IV. Allegretto (fragment)
  - 2nd version, in E♭ major
    1. Allegro moderato
    2. Andante molto
    3. Menuetto. Allegro – Trio
    4. Allegro moderato
10. D. 571, Piano Sonata in F♯ minor (1817, unfinished – fragment of an "Allegro moderato" first movement is extant. The Piano piece in A major, D. 604, an Andante, as well as the Scherzo in D major and Allegro in F♯ minor fragment from D. 570 probably constitute the remaining movements)
  1. Allegro moderato (fragment)
  2. Andante (D. 604)
  3. Scherzo. Allegro vivace – Trio (D. 570)
  4. Allegro (D. 570, fragment)
11. D. 575, Piano Sonata in B major (1817, first published as Op. posth. 147)
  1. Allegro, ma non troppo
  2. Andante
  3. Scherzo. Allegretto – Trio
  4. Allegro giusto
12. D. 613, Piano Sonata in C major (1818, unfinished – fragments of two movements are extant; the Adagio in E major, D. 612 as well as the Minuet with Trio D. 600/610 possibly constitute the remaining movements)
  1. Moderato (fragment)
  2. Adagio (D. 612)
  3. Menuetto – Trio (D. 600/610)
  4. Without tempo indication (fragment)
13. D. 625, Piano Sonata in F minor (1818, unfinished – a completed Scherzo with Trio, and fragments of two "Allegro" movements are extant; the Adagio in D♭ major D. 505 is probably the second movement)
  1. Allegro (fragment)
  2. Adagio (D. 505)
  3. Scherzo. Allegretto – Trio
  4. Allegro (fragment)
14. D. 655, Piano Sonata in C♯ minor (1819, fragment)
  1. Allegro (fragment)
15. D. 664, Piano Sonata in A major, Little A major (1819 or 1825, first published as Op. posth. 120)
  1. Allegro moderato
  2. Andante
  3. Allegro
16. D. 769A, Piano Sonata in E minor [formerly D. 994] (ca. 1823, fragment)
  1. Allegro (fragment)
17. D. 784, Piano Sonata in A minor, Grande Sonate (1823, first published as Op. posth. 143)
  1. Allegro giusto
  2. Andante
  3. Allegro vivace
18. D. 840, Piano Sonata in C major, Reliquie (1825, unfinished – first and second movements are complete; third and fourth movements are fragments)
  1. Moderato
  2. Andante
  3. Menuetto. Allegretto – Trio (fragment)
  4. Rondo. Allegro (fragment)
19. D. 845, Piano Sonata in A minor (1825, first published as Op. 42)
  1. Moderato
  2. Andante poco mosso
  3. Scherzo. Allegro vivace – Trio. Un poco più lento
  4. Rondo. Allegro vivace
20. D. 850, Piano Sonata in D major, Gasteiner (1825, first published as Op. 53)
  1. Allegro
  2. Con moto
  3. Scherzo. Allegro vivace – Trio
  4. Rondo. Allegro moderato
21. D. 894, Piano Sonata in G major, Fantasie (1826, first published as Op. 78; NSA also appends a discarded 1st version of the second movement)
  1. Molto moderato e cantabile
  2. Andante
  3. Menuetto. Allegro moderato – Trio
  4. Allegretto
22. D. 958, Piano Sonata in C minor (1828)
  1. Allegro
  2. Adagio
  3. Menuetto. Allegro – Trio
  4. Allegro
23. D. 959, Piano Sonata in A major (1828)
  1. Allegro
  2. Andantino
  3. Scherzo. Allegro vivace – Trio. Un poco più lento
  4. Rondo. Allegretto
24. D. 960, Piano Sonata in B♭ major (1828)
  1. Molto moderato
  2. Andante sostenuto
  3. Scherzo. Allegro vivace e con delicatezza – Trio
  4. Allegro, ma non troppo

There are also some possibly lost piano sonatas:

- D Anh. I/8, Piano Sonata in F major (1815, lost or identical to D. 157)
- D Anh. I/9, Piano Sonata in F major (1816, lost or identical to D. 459)
- D deest, Piano Sonata in C♯ major (1825?, lost or identical to D. 568 1st version)

Piano compositions that possibly were intended as piano sonata movements:

- D. 277A, Minuet in A minor with Trio in F major for piano (1815, alternate third movement for the Piano Sonata in C major, D. 279)
- D. 346, Allegretto in C major for piano (1816?, fragment; probably the fourth movement of the Piano Sonata in C major, D. 279)
- D. 505, Adagio in D♭ major for piano (1818?, probably the second movement of the unfinished Piano Sonata in F minor, D. 625; first published in E major in an abridged form as Op. posth. 145 No. 1)
- D. 506, Rondo in E major for piano (1817?, probably the fourth movement of the unfinished? Piano Sonata in E minor, D. 566; first published as Op. posth. 145 No. 2)
- D. 570, Scherzo in D major and Allegro in F♯ minor for piano (1817?, the "Allegro" is a fragment; these were probably intended as the third and fourth movements, respectively, of the unfinished Piano Sonata in F♯ minor, D. 571)
- D. 593, Two Scherzi for piano (1817): No. 2, Allegro moderato in D♭ major (possibly the third movement of the unfinished Sonata in D♭ major, D. 568 [1st version, formerly D. 567])
- D. 600, Minuet in C♯ minor for piano (1814?; the Trio in E major, D. 610 was probably intended for this Minuet; in turn the Minuet with Trio D. 600/610 tandem possibly constitute the third movement of the unfinished Piano Sonata in C major, D. 613)
- D. 604, Piano piece in A major (1816 or 1817; also appears as "Andante in A major"; probably the second movement of the unfinished Piano Sonata in F♯ minor, D. 571)
- D. 610, Trio in E major for piano, to be regarded as the lost son of a minuet (1818, this Trio was probably intended for the Minuet in C♯ minor, D. 600; in turn the Minuet with Trio D. 600/610 tandem possibly constitute the third movement of the unfinished Piano Sonata in C major, D. 613)
- D. 612, Adagio in E major for piano (1818, probably the second movement of the unfinished Piano Sonata in C major, D. 613)

=== Distinction between complete and incomplete piano sonatas ===
==== Complete sonatas ====
These works are by all accounts complete and have always been taken as such:

- D. 537, Piano Sonata in A minor (1817, first published as Op. posth. 164)
- D. 568, Piano Sonata E♭ major (1825-1826?, 2nd version; first published as Op. posth. 122)
- D. 575, Piano Sonata in B major (1817, first published as Op. posth. 147)
- D. 664, Piano Sonata in A major, Little A major (1819 or 1825, first published as Op. posth. 120)
- D. 784, Piano Sonata in A minor, Grande Sonate (1823, first published as Op. posth. 143)
- D. 845, Piano Sonata in A minor (1825, first published as Op. 42)
- D. 850, Piano Sonata in D major, Gasteiner (1825, first published as Op. 53)
- D. 894, Piano Sonata in G major, Fantasie (1826, first published as Op. 78)
- D. 958, Piano Sonata in C minor (1828)
- D. 959, Piano Sonata in A major (1828)
- D. 960, Piano Sonata in B♭ major (1828)

==== Possibly complete sonatas ====
The works listed below are considered complete or incomplete, depending on source:

- D. 157, Piano Sonata in E major (1815, three movements extant)
- D. 459 and D. 459A, Piano Sonata in E major (1816 and 1816?; D. 459 is a Sonata in two movements; it is usually paired with the "Three piano pieces" ["Drei Klavierstücke"], D. 459A to have either a five movement sonata or the work as it appeared in its first edition: "Five piano pieces" ["Fünf Klavierstücke"])
- D. 557, Piano Sonata in A♭ major (1817; there is not complete certainty that the third movement, in E♭ major, is the Finale of the work)
- D. 566, Piano Sonata in E minor (1817, unfinished? – first three movements are extant; the Rondo in E major, D. 506 is probably the fourth movement)

==== Incomplete sonatas and sonata fragments ====
They can be divided into the following categories:

- Unfinished sonatas with certainty about all intended movements

There is no doubt about the movements Schubert intended for the following sonata:
- D. 840, Piano Sonata in C major, Reliquie (1825, unfinished – first and second movements are complete; third and fourth movements are fragments)

- Unfinished sonatas that have independent movements associated with them

The five works listed below are by all accounts unfinished, but have independent movements (either complete or fragments) that are generally accepted as forming part of their structure:
- D. 279, Piano Sonata in C major (1815, unfinished – first three movements are extant; the Allegretto in C major, D. 346 fragment is probably the fourth movement)
- D. 568, Piano Sonata in D♭ major (1817, 1st version; the last movement is a fragment; the Scherzo in D♭ major, D. 593 No. 2 possibly constitutes the third movement)
- D. 571, Piano Sonata in F♯ minor (1817, unfinished – fragment of an "Allegro moderato" first movement is extant. The piano piece in A major, D. 604, an Andante, as well as the Scherzo in D major and Allegro in F♯ minor fragment from D. 570 probably constitute the remaining movements)
- D. 613, Piano Sonata in C major (1818, unfinished – fragments of two movements are extant; the Adagio in E major, D. 612 as well as the Minuet with Trio D. 600/610 possibly constitute the remaining movements)
- D. 625, Piano Sonata in F minor (1818, unfinished – a completed Scherzo with Trio, and fragments of two "Allegro" movements are extant; the Adagio in D♭ major, D. 505 is probably the second movement)

- Unfinished sonatas consisting of a single, incomplete movement

The three works listed below are by all accounts incomplete and have always been taken as such; only a fragment of the first movement is extant in each case:
- D. 154, Piano Sonata in E major (1815, fragment; early version of the first movement of the Piano Sonata in E major, D. 157)
- D. 655, Piano Sonata in C♯ minor (1819, fragment)
- D. 769A, Piano Sonata in E minor [formerly D. 994] (ca. 1823, fragment)

=== Numbering of the piano sonatas ===
For the piano Sonatas, there is no uniform numbering system. There are several reasons for this, including that there is no consensus regarding the inclusion of independent movements as being part of incomplete or unfinished sonatas. This issue has proven to be troubling to scholars and performers of the works, who have to decide which of these movements, if any at all, should be included for a certain sonata. In some instances, it is also necessary to determine the order in which they are to be presented.

A common numbering system, found on recordings and some websites has 21 sonatas:

1. D. 157
2. D. 279 ('Unfinished')
3. D. 459
4. D. 537, Op. posth. 164
5. D. 557
6. D. 566
7. D. 567
8. D. 571 (fragment; including various other mvmts.)
9. D. 575, Op. posth. 147
10. D. 613 (fragment)
11. D. 625
12. D. 655 (fragment)
13. D. 664, Op. 120
14. D. 784, Op. posth. 143
15. D. 840 ('Relique')
16. D. 845, Op. 42
17. D. 850, Op. 53 ('Gasteiner')
18. D. 894, Op. 78 ('Fantasy')
19. D. 958
20. D. 959
21. D. 960

==== Unnumbered editions ====
The following two editions of Schubert's piano sonatas are incomplete and abstain from providing a numbering system:

- Edition Peters – Sonaten für Klavier zu 2 Handen (Leipzig: C.F. Peters, 1970-1974): an edition in two volumes that includes eleven complete sonatas (D. 537, D. 568 2nd version, D. 575, D. 664, D. 784, D. 845, D. 850, D. 894, D. 958, D. 959, D. 960)
- Schirmer Edition – Ten sonatas for pianoforte (New York: G. Schirmer, 1906): an edition in one volume that includes ten complete sonatas (D. 537, D. 568 2nd version, D. 575, D. 664, D. 784, D. 845, D. 850, D. 958, D. 959, D. 960)

The following edition of Schubert's piano sonatas is complete, but abstains from providing a numbering system:

- G. Henle Verlag – Klaviersonaten (München: G. Henle, 1979-1989): an urtext edition in three volumes that includes all complete sonatas, all unfinished sonatas, and all independent movements generally associated with these unfinished works (D. 154, D. 157, D. 279/346/(277A), D. 459/459A, D. 537, D. 557, D. 566/506, D. 568 1st and 2nd versions, D. 571/604/570, D. 575, D. 613/612, D. 625/505, D. 655, D. 664, D. 769A, D. 784, D. 840, D. 845, D. 850, D. 894, D. 958, D. 959, D. 960) . Volumes I and II were edited by Paul Mies and fingered by Hans-Martin Theopold. Volume III was edited and fingered by Paul Badura-Skoda. It includes all unfinished sonatas and the independent movements associated with them, with completions by Badura-Skoda of all fragments with the exception of D. 154, D. 655 and D. 769A. While the sonatas in this last volume carry a numbering of 1-10, this is not a numbering system of the entire sonata output, given that the first two volumes assign numbers 1-11 to the works they contain.

==== Numbered editions ====
- Breitkopf & Härtel Franz Schubert's Werke: Kritisch durchgesehene Gesammtausgabe – Serie 10: Sonaten für Pianoforte (Leipzig: Breitkopf & Härtel, 1888). An edition in one volume that includes fifteen piano sonatas:
  1. D. 157
  2. D. 279
  3. D. 537
  4. D. 557
  5. D. 566 (1st movement only)
  6. D. 568 2nd version
  7. D. 575
  8. D. 664
  9. D. 784
  10. D. 845
  11. D. 850
  12. D. 894
  13. D. 958
  14. D. 959
  15. D. 960

This was the first publication that claimed to print the complete set of Schubert's piano sonatas. This edition has been reprinted from 1970 onwards by Dover Publications. The International Music Score Library Project IMSLP website has facsimiles of many of the sonatas according to this first edition, including the numbering X,1 – X,2 – etc. on the score. In the supplement (series 21) were printed the fragments D. 154, D. 568 (1st version), D. 571, D. 613, D. 625, D. 655, and D. 840; D. 459 and 459A were printed in series 11 for piano pieces.

- Wiener Urtext Edition (Schott/Universal Edition) Franz Schubert: Complete Sonatas. An edition in three volumes that includes all complete sonatas, all unfinished sonatas, and all independent movements generally associated with these unfinished works:
  - Vol. 1
    - Sonate Nr. 1 E major D. 157
    - Sonate Nr. 2 C major D. 279
    - Sonate Nr. 3 E major D. 459
    - Sonate Nr. 4 A minor D. 537
    - Sonate Nr. 5 A♭ major D. 557
    - Sonate Nr. 6 E minor D. 566
    - Sonate Nr. 7 D♭ major D. 567
    - Sonate Nr. 8 E♭ major D. 568
    - Fragment E major D. 154
    - Menuetto A minor D. 277A
  - Vol. 2
    - Sonate Nr. 9 F♯ major D. 571
    - Sonate Nr. 10 B major D. 575
    - Sonate Nr. 11 C major D. 613
    - Sonate Nr. 12 F minor D. 625
    - Sonate Nr. 13 A major D. 664
    - Sonate Nr. 14 A minor D. 784
    - Sonate Nr. 15 C major D. 840
    - Sonate Nr. 16 A minor D. 845
    - Fragment Sonate C♯ minor D. 655
    - Fragment Sonate E minor D. 769A
  - Vol. 3
    - Sonate Nr. 17 D major D. 850
    - Sonate Nr. 18 G major D. 894
    - Sonate Nr. 19 C minor D. 958
    - Sonate Nr. 20 A major D. 959
    - Sonate Nr. 21 B♭ major D. 960

The only differences with the above "commercial" 21 sonatas numbering system are in the range 8–12 (starting with whether or not 567/568 is counted as one or two sonatas, and ending where the D. 655 fragment is included or left out). It was edited from the sources and provided with commentary and fingering by Martino Tirimo.

- Neue Schubert-Ausgabe, in volumes VII/2, 1–3:
  1. Piano Sonata in E major, D. 157
  2. Piano Sonata in C major, D. 279
  3. Piano Sonata in E major, D. 459
  4. Piano Sonata in A minor, D. 537
  5. Piano Sonata in A♭ major, D. 557
  6. Piano Sonata in E minor, D. 566
  7. a. Piano Sonata in D♭ major, D. 568 – b. Piano Sonata in E♭ major, D. 568
  8. Scherzo and allegro D 570
  9. Piano Sonata in B major, D. 575
  10. Piano Sonata in F minor, D. 625
  11. Piano Sonata in A major, D. 664
  12. Piano Sonata in A minor, D. 784
  13. Piano Sonata in C major, D. 840
  14. Piano Sonata in A minor, D. 845
  15. Piano Sonata in D major, D. 850
  16. Piano Sonata in G major, D. 894
  17. Piano Sonata in C minor, D. 958
  18. Piano Sonata in A major, D. 959
  19. Piano Sonata in B♭ major, D. 960

Apart from preliminary sketches of some of the above, also following incomplete piano compositions are printed in the appendices of these volumes: D 154, D 309A, D 571, D 505, D 613, D 655 and D 769A.

==== Other numbering systems ====
In addition to the numbering systems found in the above named editions, one more can be cited. This numbering system can be found in two websites:

- "Schubert: Catalogo delle composizioni" at flaminioonline.it
- "Franz Schubert Catalogue: 610 - Oeuvres pour piano" at musiqueorguequebec.ca

This is a system in which twenty-three sonatas and fragments are numbered. In this system D. 769A is numbered as No. 4.

== Fantasies for piano solo ==
- D. 2 E, Fantasy in C minor for piano [formerly D. 993] (1811)
- D. 605, Fantasy in C major for piano (1821–23, fragment)
- D. 605A, Fantasy in C major for piano, Grazer Fantasy (1818?)
- D. 760, Fantasy in C major for piano, Wanderer Fantasy (1822, first published as Op. 15)
  1. Allegro con fuoco ma non troppo
  2. Adagio
  3. Presto
  4. Allegro
- D. 894, Piano Sonata in G major, Fantasie (1826, first published as Op. 78; NSA also appends a discarded 1st version of the second movement)
  1. Molto moderato e cantabile
  2. Andante
  3. Menuetto. Allegro moderato – Trio
  4. Allegretto
- D Anh. I/10, Fantasy in E♭ major for piano (1825?, lost)

== Sonatas and Fantasies for piano four-hands ==
- D. 1, Fantasy in G major for piano duet (1810, a discarded first version of the "Finale" is also extant)
  1. Adagio - Allegro
  2. Presto - Allegretto
  3. Finale: Allegro maestoso (an alternative discarded first version of the Finale also exists)
- D. 1B, Fantasy in G major for piano duet (1810 or 1811, fragment)
- D. 1C, Sonata in F major for piano duet (1810 or 1811, fragment of the first movement is extant)
- D. 9, Fantasy in G minor for piano duet (1811)
- D. 48, Fantasy in C minor for piano duet, Grande Sonate (1813, 2 versions)
- D. 608, Rondo in D major for piano duet, Notre amitié est invariable (1818, 2 versions; 2nd version first published as Op. posth. 138)
- D. 617, Sonata in B♭ major for piano duet (1818, first published as Op. 30)
- D. 812, Sonata in C major for piano duet, Grand Duo (1824, first published as Op. posth. 140)
- D. 940, Fantasy in F minor for piano duet (1828, first published as Op. 103)
- D. 947, Allegro in A minor for piano duet, Lebensstürme (1828, first published as Op. posth. 144)
- D. 951, Rondo in A major for piano duet, Grand Rondeau (1828, first published as Op. 107)
- D. 968, Allegro moderato in C major and Andante in A minor for piano duet, Sonatine (between 1815 and 1819?)
- D. 968A, Introduction, Four Variations on an original theme and Finale in B♭ major for piano duet [formerly D. 603] (date unknown, first published as Op. posth. 82 No. 2)

== Sonatas and duos for a piano and an instrument ==
=== Violin and piano ===
- Three Sonatinas for Violin and Piano, Op. 137.
  - Sonatina in D major, D 384 (Op. 137 No. 1)
  - Sonatina in A minor, D 385 (Op. 137 No. 2)
  - Sonatina in G minor, D 408 (Op. 137 No. 3)
- Sonata or (Grand) Duo in A major for Violin and Piano, D 574 (Op. 162)
- Rondo (Brillant) in B minor for Violin and Piano, D 895 (Op. 70)
- Fantasy in C major for Violin and Piano, D 934 (Op. 159)

=== Arpeggione and piano ===
- Sonata in A minor for Arpeggione and Piano, D 821

=== Flute and piano ===
- Introduction and Variations, D 802, for flute and piano

== Sonatas for three players ==
- Trio in B♭ major for violin, violoncello and piano, D 28, a.k.a. Sonatensatz (sonata movement): an "Allegro" movement composed in 1812 is extant

None of the other trios Schubert composed are indicated as sonata.

== Scores ==
- Schubert-Autographs by Austrian Academy of Sciences
- Category:Schubert, Franz at IMSLP
- Franz Schubert's Werke: Kritisch durchgesehene Gesammtausgabe (= Alte Gesamtausgabe = AGA):
  - Julius Epstein (ed.) Serie 10: Sonaten für Pianoforte. Leipzig: Breitkopf & Härtel, 1888.
    - (replication): Franz Schubert. Complete Sonatas for Pianoforte Solo. New York: Dover Publications, 1970. ISBN 0-486-22647-6
  - Julius Epstein (ed.) Serie 11: Phantasie, Impromptus und andere Stücke für Pianoforte. Leipzig: Breitkopf & Härtel, 1888.
  - Eusebius Mandyczewski (ed.) Serie 21: Supplement: Instrumentalmusik; Gesangsmusik. Leipzig: Breitkopf & Härtel, 1897.
  - Julius Epstein, Eusebius Mandyczewski (eds.) Revisionsbericht - Serie X: Sonaten für Pianoforte. Leipzig: Breitkopf & Härtel, 1893
  - Julius Epstein, Eusebius Mandyczewski (eds.) Revisionsbericht - Serie XI: Phantasie, Impromptus und andere Stücke für Pianoforte. Leipzig: Breitkopf & Härtel, 1894
  - Revisionsbericht - Serie XXI: Supplement. Leipzig: Breitkopf & Härtel
- Henle (Urtext Edition):
  - Paul Mies (ed.) Piano Sonatas, Volume I. 1971.
  - Paul Mies (ed.) Piano Sonatas, Volume II. 1973.
  - Paul Badura-Skoda (ed.) Piano Sonatas, Volume III (Early and Unfinished Sonatas). 1997.
- Wiener Urtext Edition:
  - Martino Tirimo (ed.) Franz Schubert: The Complete Piano Sonatas. 1997.
    - Vol. 1 ISMN 979-0-50057-223-7 ISBN 978-3-85055-584-5
    - Vol. 2 ISMN 979-0-50057-224-4 ISBN 978-3-85055-552-4
    - Vol. 3 ISMN 979-0-50057-225-1 ISBN 978-3-85055-553-1
  - Paul Badura-Skoda (ed.)
    - Franz Schubert: Fantasy C major "Wanderer-Fantasie" ISMN 979-0-50057-009-7 ISBN 978-3-85055-009-3
- Franz Schubert: Neue Ausgabe sämtlicher Werke (= Neue Gesamtausgabe = NGA = Neue Schubert-Ausgabe = NSA = New Schubert Edition = NSE):
  - Walburga Litschauer (ed). Series VII Part 2 Volume 1: Klaviersonaten I. Kassel: Bärenreiter, 2000. ISMN 9790006497119
  - Walburga Litschauer (ed). Series VII Part 2 Volume 2: Klaviersonaten II. Kassel: Bärenreiter, 2003. ISMN 9790006497195
  - Walburga Litschauer (ed). Series VII Part 2 Volume 3: Klaviersonaten III. Kassel: Bärenreiter, 1996. ISMN 9790006472475
  - David Goldberger (ed). Series VII Part 2 Volume 4: Klavierstücke I. Kassel: Bärenreiter, 1988. ISMN 9790006472208
  - Christa Landon and Walther Dürr (eds). Series VII Part 2 Volume 5: Klavierstücke II. Kassel: Bärenreiter, 1984. ISMN 9790006472161
  - Alfred Mann (ed). Series VIII Volume 2: Schuberts Studien. Kassel: Bärenreiter, 1986. ISMN 9790006472192

== Lists of (piano) compositions by Schubert ==
- (in German) Otto Erich Deutsch. Franz Schubert, thematisches Verzeichnis seiner Werke in chronologischer Folge (New Schubert Edition Series VIII Supplement, Volume 4). Kassel: Bärenreiter, 1978. ISMN 9790006305148 – ISBN 9783761805718
  - Aderhold, Werner (ed.) Franz Schubert: Deutsch-Verzeichnis – Studienausgabe. Kassel: Bärenreiter, 2012. ISMN 9790006315864 – ISBN 9783761812587
  - Franz Schubert, Thematisches Verzeichnis seiner Werke in chronologischer Folge on-line copy at archive.org
- Schubert Database by Neue Schubert-Ausgabe
- List of works by Franz Schubert at International Music Score Library Project
- (in French) Franz Schubert Catalogue: 610 - Oeuvres pour piano at musiqueorguequebec.ca
- (in Italian) Franz SCHUBERT: Catalogo delle composizioni at flaminioonline.it
