= The LiederNet Archive =

Web archive of song and choral texts

- Former names: The Lied and Songs Texts Page; The Lied, Art Song, and Choral Texts Archive
- Available in: English
- Headquarters: {{{location_country}}}
- Owner: Emily Ezust
- Creators: Emily Ezust, Shawn Thuris (2019 redesign)
- Website: https://www.lieder.net/
- Commercial: No
- Launched: 1995
- Current status: Online
- Written in: Perl 5, DBIx::Class, Aurora (MySQL)
- OCLC number: 456122816

The LiederNet Archive (formerly The Lied, Art Song, and Choral Texts Archive) is a donation-supported web archive of art song and choral texts founded in 1995 by Emily Ezust of McGill University, an American/Canadian computer programmer and amateur violinist. The website was hosted by the REC Music Foundation from 1996 to 2015.

The LiederNet Archive provides access to both original out-of-copyright song texts and copyright-protected translations submitted by over 1000 volunteer translators. The website is indexed by composer, text author, first line, title.

The LiederNet Archive is frequently cited as a source in musical studies, where the website's aggregate listings of settings of songs and poems may be more complete or more easily accessible than conventional musicological resources.
