= Peter Branscombe =

English academic, musicologist and writer

- Born: 7 December 1929; Sittingbourne, England
- Died: 31 December 2008 (aged 79); St Andrews, Scotland
- Education: Worcester College, Oxford
- Occupation: Academic
- Spouse: Marina Riley (m. 1967)
- Children: 3

Peter John Branscombe (7 December 1929 – 31 December 2008) was an English academic in German studies, a musicologist, and a writer on Austrian cultural history.

== Background ==
Peter John Branscombe was born in Sittingbourne, Kent, on 7 December 1929. He attended Dulwich College where he showed talent as cricket player. Having served his military service in Vienna, Austria, he studied literature at Worcester College, Oxford. There, he became acquainted with notable Austrian émigrés such as the composer Egon Wellesz and the musicologist Otto Erich Deutsch.

== Career ==
After a brief stint at Lancing College, Branscombe joined the University of St Andrews' faculty of German Studies in 1959, a post he kept until the end of his life. In 1979, he founded St Andrews' Institute for Austrian Studies, the only such research facility in the United Kingdom.

His interests included the popular theatre of the Biedermeier and the Viennese suburban theatre with authors like Raimund and Nestroy. He wrote works on Joseph Haydn, Mozart and Schubert. Over many years, he wrote reviews of concerts and recordings and contributed to The Grove Dictionary of Music and Musicians and the Wagner-Handbuch (Wagner Handbook) where he researched many forgotten composers of the 19th century. Branscombe also translated poems by Heinrich Heine and academic texts.

Between 1996 and 2001, Branscombe edited six Possen for the historical-critical edition of Nestroy's complete works.

Branscombe retired from teaching in the final years of his life, but continued to write throughout his retirement.

== Personal life ==
In 1967, Branscombe married German studies academic Marina Riley, and they had three children. He died from cancer at his St Andrews home on 31 December 2008, at the age of 79.

== Selected works ==
- Unpublished dissertation in two volumes: The connexions between drama and music in the Viennese popular theatre from the opening of the Leopoldstädter Theater (1781) to Nestroy's opera parodies (ca 1855), with special reference to the forms of parody, 1976, Wiener Stadtbibliothek
- Heinrich Heine – Selected Verse by Heine. Translated by Peter Branscombe. Penguin Books. 1967/1968.
- Austrian Life and Literature, 1780–1938. Eight essays. Scottish Academic Press 1978.
- Schubert Studies. Problems of Style and Chronology. (with Eva Badura-Skoda) Cambridge 1978, ISBN 978-0-521-22606-6
- W. A. Mozart: Die Zauberflöte. Cambridge Opera Handbooks. Cambridge 1991, ISBN 978-0-521-31916-4
- Numerous contributions and reviews in: Forum for Modern Language Studies, Austrian Studies, Nestroyana
