= Elizabeth Norman McKay =

English musicologist, pianist and Lieder accompanist

- Born: 1931; London, England
- Died: 20 May 2018 (aged 86–87)
- Education: Bristol University; PhD University of Oxford (Somerville College)
- Occupation: Musicologist
- Writing career
- Subject: Music
- Notable works: Franz Schubert's music for the theatre, Franz Schubert : a biography

Elizabeth Norman McKay (née Norman) (1931 – 20 May 2018) was an English musicologist, pianist and Lieder accompanist.

McKay graduated from Lawnswood High School in Leeds in 1947/48.

She gained a degree in Physics from Bristol University, and worked in London as a pianist, accompanist, and repetiteur. In 1962 she was awarded a D.Phil. from the University of Oxford (where she studied at Somerville College) for her thesis on Schubert's music for the theatre.

She was formerly Tutor in Piano and Visiting Professor at the Birmingham Conservatoire.

Her publications include three books on Franz Schubert, and many contributions to symposia and dictionaries.

== Selected bibliography ==
- 1962 The stage-works of Schubert, considered in the framework of Austrian Biedermeier society
- 1991 Franz Schubert's music for the theatre
- 1987 The impact of the new pianofortes on classical keyboard style : Mozart, Beethoven, and Schubert
- 1996 / 2001 Franz Schubert : a biography
- 1998 The Oxford Bicentenary Symposium 1997 : Bericht - The Biedermeier and Beyond (1997)
- 1998 Schubert's string and piano duos in context
- 2003 Schubert and the theatre
- 2009 Schubert : the piano and dark keys
