= Eva Badura-Skoda =

Austrian musicologist (1929–2021)

- Born: Eva Halfar; 15 January 1929; Munich, Bavaria, Germany
- Died: 8 January 2021 (aged 91); Vienna, Austria
- Education: PhD University of Innsbruck
- Occupation: Musicologist
- Spouse: Paul Badura-Skoda (m. 1951, separation)
- Children: 4, including the pianist Michael Badura-Skoda (1964–2001)

Eva Badura-Skoda (née Halfar; 15 January 1929 – 8 January 2021) was a German-born Austrian musicologist.

== Biography ==
Born in Munich, Eva Halfar studied at the Vienna Conservatory and took courses in musicology, philosophy, and art history at the universities of Heidelberg, Vienna (Erich Schenk), and Innsbruck (Ph.D., 1953, with the thesis Studien zur Geschichte des Musikunterrichtes in Österreich im 16., 17. und 18. Jahrhundert).

In 1951 she married Paul Badura-Skoda, with whom she collaborated on the volumes Mozart-Interpretation (Vienna, 1957; English transl., 1961; 2nd edition, rev., 1996) and Bach-Interpretation (Laaber, 1990; English transl., 1992). The couple had four children, including the pianist Michael Badura-Skoda (1964–2001); they separated later.

In 1962 and 1963 she led summer seminars at the Salzburg Mozarteum. In 1964 she was the Brittingham visiting professor at the University of Wisconsin, where she served as professor of musicology from 1966 to 1974. She was a visiting professor at Boston University (1976), Queen's University in Kingston, Ontario (1979), McGill University in Montreal (1981–82), and the University of Göttingen (1982–83). In 1986 she was awarded the Austrian Cross of Honour for Science and Art by the Austrian government.

Badura-Skoda contributed many articles to books, reference works, and journals, and also edited scores by Haydn, Dittersdorf, Mozart, and Schubert.

With Peter Branscombe, she edited the volume Schubert Studies: Problems of Style and Chronology (Cambridge, 1982). She also edited the report of the international Haydn congress held in Vienna in 1982 (Munich, 1986) and was an editor of a volume on Schubert and his friends (Cologne and Vienna, 1999).

The book Mozart-Interpretation, written with co-author Paul Badura-Skoda, is a detailed study of textual and performance issues which are of importance to the serious pianist, but also to any listener desiring insight into the significant issues that a pianist must deal with when presenting Mozart piano works.

Badura-Skoda died in Vienna on 8 January 2021, aged 91.

== Selected bibliography ==
- Schubert studies: problems of style and chronology; edited by Eva Badura-Skoda and Peter Branscombe. Cambridge University Press, 1982. xiv, 369 p. ISBN 0-521-22606-6
- Proceedings of the International Joseph Haydn Congress Joseph Haydn (Bericht über den Internationalen Joseph Haydn Kongress) Vienna Hofburg, 5–12 September 1982. Munich: Henle, 1986.
- Interpreting Mozart: the performance of his piano pieces and other compositions by Eva and Paul Badura-Skoda. 2nd edition, New York/London. Routledge 2008, xvii, 474 p. 1 CD-ROM.

== See also ==
- Women in musicology
