= String Quartet No. 3 (Schubert) =

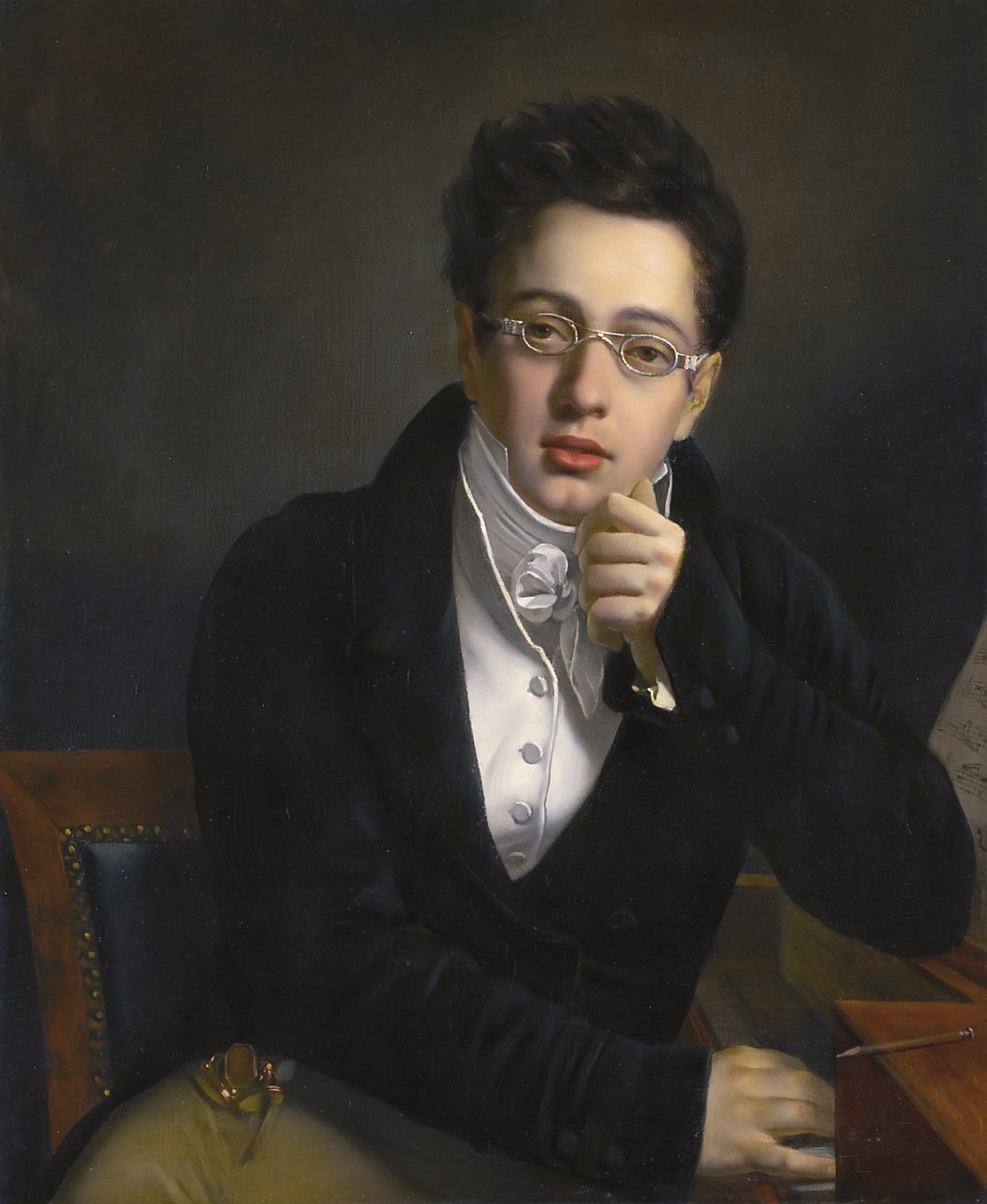
Possible portrait of the young Franz Schubert c. 1814, attributed to Josef Abel

The String Quartet No. 3 (D 36) in B♭ major was composed by Franz Schubert in 1813.

== Movements ==
The string quartet has four movements:

1. Allegro (B♭ major)
2. Andante (B♭ major)
3. Menuetto (D major, with Trio in B♭ major)
4. Allegretto (B♭ major)

== Sources ==
- Franz Schubert's Works, Series V: Streichquartette edited by Joseph Hellmesberger and Eusebius Mandyczewski. Breitkopf & Härtel, 1890
- Otto Erich Deutsch (and others). Schubert Thematic Catalogue (several editions), No. 36.
- New Schubert Edition, Series VI, Volume 3: Streichquartette I edited by Martin Chusid. Bärenreiter, 1979.
