= Johann Philipp Neumann =

Austrian physicist, librarian and poet (1774–1849)

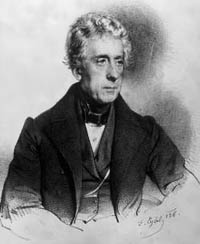
- Born: 27 December 1774; Třebíč, Moravia
- Died: 3 October 1849 (aged 74); Vienna, Austrian Empire

Academic background
- Education: University of Vienna

Johann Philipp Neumann (27 December 1774 – 3 October 1849) was an Austrian physicist, librarian and poet.

Born in Trebitsch in Moravia, he completed his studies at the University of Vienna. In 1803, he was appointed as a professor of physics at his local lyceum. He was transferred to the University of Graz in 1806, where he became a rector in 1811.

In 1815, he was appointed as a professor at the Polytechnic Institute in Vienna (now the Vienna University of Technology). He founded a library there in 1816, which he directed until 1845.

Neumann was a friend of the composer Franz Schubert. Neumann adapted Georg Forster's translation of Shakuntala as a libretto for an opera, which Schubert commenced in 1820 but never completed. Neumann, a liberal-minded churchman, was interested in simple music designed to appeal to "the widest possible congregation". To this end, he wrote the text of eight hymns and a translation of the Lord's Prayer, and commissioned the Deutsche Messe from his friend Schubert in 1826.

He retired in 1844, and died in Vienna in 1849.
