= Edwin F. Kalmus =

Austrian-born American music publisher (1893-1989)

Edwin F. Kalmus (December 5, 1893 – April 30, 1989) was an Austrian-born American music publisher.

== Early life ==
Edwin F. Kalmus was born in Vienna.

== Career ==
In 1926, he founded his eponymous publishing house in New York City which quickly became one of the largest self-contained publishing houses in the United States. Although several contemporary American works were issued in the 1930s, Kalmus' enterprise increasingly concentrated in publishing classical works that had entered the public domain in the US, making them widely available in inexpensive reprint editions.

After moving the firm to Miami in 1971, Kalmus sold the study score, vocal, piano and chamber music titles to Belwin-Mills (1976), though the original company remained independent and continues to publish orchestra, band, and chamber music from its new headquarters in Boca Raton, Florida. Divisions and imprints of the Boca Raton firm include The Well-Tempered Press, Masters Music Publications, and Klavier Records. In January 2008, the Cleveland, Ohio music publisher Ludwig Music Publications was purchased and Masters Music division was renamed LudwigMasters Publications.

== Legacy ==
The Belwin-Mills controlled portion, subsequently taken over by Columbia Pictures Publications, Warner Brothers Publications and ultimately Alfred Music, continues to publish music with the Kalmus name under the Kalmus Classic Series imprint, the vast majority consisting of inexpensive reprints of old editions now in the public domain.
