= Armin Kircher =

Austrian composer and conductor

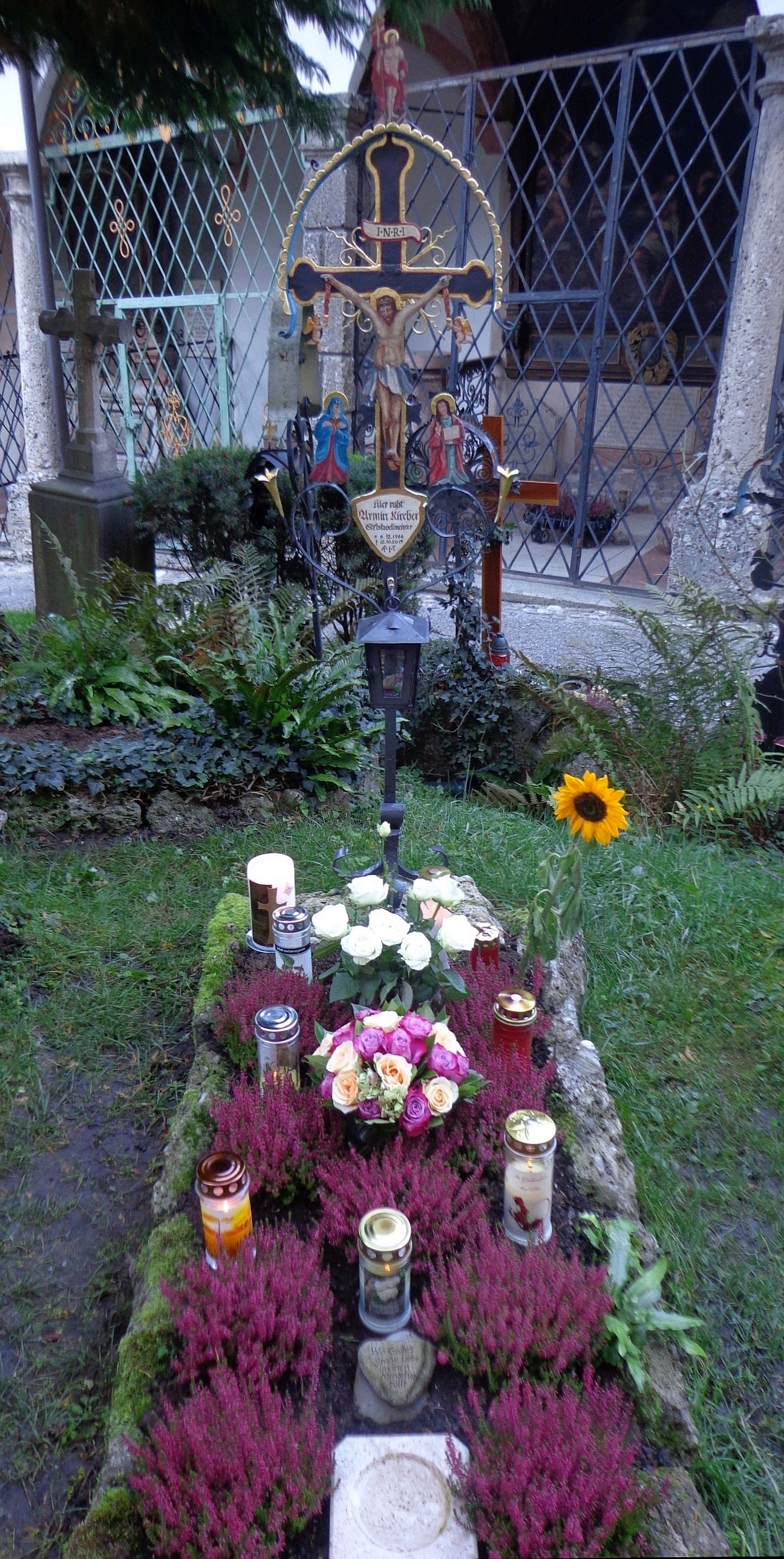
Grave of Armin Kircher in Salzburg

Armin Kircher (1966 – 12 October 2015) was an Austrian composer and conductor.

== Life ==
Born in Kufstein, Austria, in 1966 Kircher grew up in Breitenbach am Inn and completed his matura in 1985 at the College Borrpmaeum in Salzburg.

He led the church music department of the Archdiocese of Salzburg and was, from 1992 to 2015, the organizational manager of the Austrian working week for church music. He was also a conductor at the Collegiate Church of St. Peter in Salzburg and organist at the oldest preserved organ in the city of Salzburg in the Kajetanerkirche.

He was the editor of several editions of ancient and modern choral music. He wrote numerous refrains in praise of God in 2013.

Kircher died on 12 October 2015 of heart failure.
