= List of compositions by Franz Schubert (1819) =

Franz Schubert's compositions of 1819 are mostly in the Deutsch catalogue (D) range D 633–678, and include:

- Instrumental works:
  - Trout Quintet, D 667 (year of composition however uncertain)
  - Piano Sonata in C-sharp minor, D 655
  - Piano Sonata in A major, D 664 (or 1825?)
- Vocal music:
  - Mass No. 5, D 678 (first version started in 1819)
  - Die Zwillingsbrüder, D 647
  - "Prometheus", D 674

== Table ==
=== Legend ===
Legend to the table
column		content
1	D '51	Deutsch number in the first version of the Deutsch catalogue (1951)
2	D utd	most recent (utd = up to date) Deutsch catalogue number; the basic collation of the list is according to these numbers – whether or not the possibility to adjust the sorting according to the content of other columns is available depends on the device with which the table is displayed.
3	Op. pbl	Opus number (Op.; p indicates Post. = posthumous) and date of first publication (pbl; between brackets; when there is more than one date the earlier dates indicate partial publications). The column sorts to Opus number, then (earliest of) the publication date(s)
4	AGA	Alte Gesamt-Ausgabe = Franz Schubert's Werke: Kritisch durchgesehene Gesammtausgabe. Indicates genre/instrumentation: Series I: Symphonien (Nos. 1-8) (Johannes Brahms, 1884); Series II: Overtüren und Andere Orchesterwerke (Johann Nepomuk Fuchs, 1886); Series III: Oktette (Nos. 1-3) and IV: Streichquintett (Eusebius Mandyczewski, 1889); Series V: Streichquartette (Nos. 1-15) (Joseph Hellmesberger and Eusebius Mandyczewski, 1890); Series VI: Trio für Streichinstrumente (Eusebius Mandyczewski, 1892); Series VII: Trios, Quartets and Quintets with Piano and VIII: Pianoforte und Ein Instrument (Ignaz Brüll, 1886); Series IX: Pianoforte zu vier Händen (Anton Door, 1888); Series X: Sonaten für Pianoforte (Julius Epstein, 1888); Series XI: Fantasie, Impromptus und andere Stücke für Pianoforte (Julius Epstein, 1888); Series XII: Tänze für Pianoforte (Nos. 1-31) (Julius Epstein, 1889); Series XIII: Messen (Nos. 1-7) (Eusebius Mandyczewski, 1887); Series XIV: Kleinere Kirchenmusikwerke (Nos. 1-22) (Eusebius Mandyczewski, 1888); Series XV: Dramatische Musik (Johann Nepomuk Fuchs, 1893); Series XVI: Werke für Männerchor (Nos. 1-46) (Eusebius Mandyczewski, 1891); Series XVII: Werke für gemischten Chor (Nos. 1-19) (Josef Gänsbacher, Eusebius Mandyczewski, 1892); Series XVIII: Werke für Drei und mehr Frauenstimmen mit Pianoforte-Begleitung (Nos. 1-6) (Josef Gänsbacher, Eusebius Mandyczewski, 1891); Series XIX: Kleine Gesangswerke (Nos. 1-36) (Josef Gänsbacher and Eusebius Mandyczewski, 1892); Series XX: Sämtliche einstimmige Lieder und Gesänge (Eusebius Mandyczewski, 1894-1895); Series XXI: Supplement (Eusebius Mandyczewski, 1897); 1. Instrumentalmusik No. 1-5; 2. Instrumentalmusik No. 6-13; 3. Instrumentalmusik No. 14-; 4. Gesangsmusik; Series XXII: Revisionsbericht
5	NSA	NGA/NSA/NSE = New Schubert Edition, also indicates genre/instrumentation: Series I: Church Music; Series II: Stage Works; Series III: Part Songs; Series IV: Lieder; Series V: Orchestral Works; Series VI: Chamber Music; 1. Octet and Nonet; 2. String Quintet; 3. String Quartets I; 4. String Quartets II; 5. String Quartets III; 6. String Trios; 7. Works for Piano and several instruments; 8. Works for Piano and one instrument; 9. Dances for several instruments; Series VII: Piano Music; 1. Works for Piano Four Hands; 2. Works for Piano Two Hands; Series VIII: Supplement, 2. Schubert's Studies
6	Name	unique name, with, if available, a link to the relevant encyclopedia article; sorts by name with initial definite ("Der", "Die", "Das", ...) or indefinite ("Ein", "A", ...) articles, and numbers, moved after the expression they qualify: e.g. "Die Hoffnung, ..." sorts as "Hoffnung, Die, ..." – "Thirty Minuets ..." sorts as "Minuets, 30, ...".
7	Key / incipit	incipit mostly for songs (linking to lyrics and their translation, for instance at The LiederNet Archive, when available), other compositions by key, except for Schubert's stage works: type of composition in brackets.
8	Date	(presumed) date of composition, or, for copies and arrangements, date of Schubert's autograph. Sorts to earliest possible date of completion, unlike the chronology of the Deutsch catalogue that generally collates according to earliest date associated with the composition: e.g. Schubert started the composition of his 3rd String Quartet on 19 November 1812 and completed it on 21 February 1813 – in the Deutsch catalogue the composition is grouped with other compositions from 1812: when using the sort function of the 8th column the composition is grouped with compositions completed in 1813
9	Additional info	may include: Information about the text (lyrics, libretto) of vocal compositions: e.g., "Text by [text author]", "Text: [standard lyrics]", "... from [literary work]"; "other settings: D ..." indicates Schubert's other settings of the same text; for fields starting with "Text ..." this column sorts by text author (last name, first name—or pen name when such name is more established), then incipit of the lyrics (alternatively, when the incipit is rarely used, title of the work); Information about the authenticity of the composition: the work is without doubt Schubert's unless when marked as "Doubtful", "Spurious?" or "Spurious" (in the last case columns 3–8 give no further information about the composition); Forces needed for performance ("For ..."): may be omitted when the type of composition makes the instrumentation clear (e.g. String Quartet → two violins, viola and cello), and, for vocal music, when the setting is for voice and piano; "s", "a", "t" and "b" refer to a single soprano, alto, tenor and bass singer respectively, while "S", "A", "T" and "B" to choral parts for the same types of singers (see SATB).; Specifications regarding movements (e.g. "Allegro – Minuet – Rondo") or sections (e.g. "No. 1 ..."); Information about the completeness of the extant work: the work is considered complete as extant unless when marked "Sketch", "Incomplete", "Unfinished", "Fragment" or "Lost"; Information about versions (e.g. "Two versions: ...")

=== List ===
Compositions by Franz Schubert listed in the Deutsch catalogue for 1819
D '51	D utd	Op. pbl	AGA	NSA	Name	Key / incipit	Date	Additional info
633	633	57,1 (1826)	XX, 3 No. 179	IV, 3	Der Schmetterling	Wie soll ich nicht tanzen	1819–1823?	Text by Schlegel, F., from Abendröte I, 7
634	634	57,2 (1826)	XX, 3 No. 180	IV, 3	Die Berge	Sieht uns der Blick gehoben	1819–1823?	Text by Schlegel, F., from Abendröte I, 1
635	635	(1900) (1906– 1907)		III, 4 No. 44	Leise, leise laßt uns singen, later also: Ruhe, and: (Nächtliches) Ständchen	Leise, leise laßt uns singen, schlummre sanft (later also: Leise, leise laßt uns singen, still schon sieht der Mond)	c. 1819	For ttbb; later text versions, from 1900, by Robert Graf and Anton Weiß
636	636	39 (1826) (1895) (1975)	XX, 6 No. 357	IV, 2a & b No. 9	Sehnsucht, D 636	Ach, aus dieses Tales Gründen	early 1821?	Text by Schiller (other setting: D 52); Three versions: 1st not in AGA – 3rd is Op. 39
637	637	87,2 (1827)	XX, 6 No. 358	IV, 4	(Die) Hoffnung, D 637	Es reden und träumen die Menschen viel	c. 1819?	Text by Schiller (other setting: D 251)
638	638	87,3 (1827) (1895)	XX, 6 No. 359	IV, 4	Der Jüngling am Bache, D 638	An der Quelle saß der Knabe	April 1819	Text by Schiller (other settings: D 30 and 192); Two versions: 2nd is Op. 87 No. 3
639; 949	639	(1820) (1832)	XX, 9 No. 553	IV, 5	Widerschein	Fischer harrt am Brückenbogen; Tom Lehnt harrend auf der Brücke	1820; May/Sept. 1828	Text by Schlechta; Two versions; 1st publ. 1820 – 2nd, in AGA with another text variant ("Harrt ein Fischer auf der Brücke"), was D 949
641	598							See D 598
642	642	(1937)		III, 2a No. 1	Viel tausend Sterne prangen	Viel tausend Sterne prangen	1812?	Text by Eberhard; For satb and piano
643	643	(1889)	XII; No. 21	VII/2, 6	German Dance and Écossaise	C♯ minor (German dance); D♭ major (Écossaise)	1819	For piano
	643A	(1972)		III, 2a No. 11	Das Grab, D 643A	Das Grab ist tief und stille	1819	Text by Salis-Seewis (other settings: D 329A, 330, 377 and 569); For satb
644	644	(1855) (1887) (1891) (1975)	XV, 4 No. 7	II, 4	Die Zauberharfe	(Incidental music); Was belebt die schöne Welt? (Romanze from No. 9) – Durch der Töne Zaubermacht (final choir)	Apr.–Aug. 1820	Text by Georg von Hofmann; Music for tSATB and orchestra; Three acts: Overture (reused in D 797, publ. 1855) and Nos. 1–4 – Nos. 5–9 (Romanze from No.9, not in AGA, publ. 1887 with piano reduction and 1975 in concert version) – Overture and Nos. 10–13
645	645			IV, 12	Abend, D 645	Wie ist es denn, daß trüb und schwer	early 1819	Text by Tieck; Fragment of a sketch
646	646	(1885)	XX, 6 No. 350	IV, 12	Die Gebüsche	Es wehet kühl und leise	January; 1819	Text by Schlegel, F., from Abendröte II, 9
647	647	(1872) (1889)	XV, 3 No. 5	II, 5	Die Zwillingsbrüder	(Singspiel)	Oct. 1818– 1819	For stbbbSATB and orchestra (piano reduction in 1872 edition); Overture and Nos. 1–10
648	648	(1886)	II No. 7	V, 5	Overture, D 648	E minor	February; 1819	For orchestra
649	649	65,2 (1826)	XX, 6 No. 351	IV, 3	Der Wanderer, D 649	Wie deutlich des Mondes Licht zu mir spricht	February; 1819	Text by Schlegel, F., from Abendröte II, 1; Two versions: 2nd is Op. 65 No. 2
650	650	(1831)	XX, 6 No. 352	IV, 12	Abendbilder	Still beginnt's im Hain zu tauen	February; 1819	Text by Silbert
651	651	(1831)	XX, 6 No. 353	IV, 12	Himmelsfunken	Der Odem Gottes weht	February; 1819	Text by Silbert
652	652	(1842)	XX, 6 No. 354	IV, 12	Das Mädchen, D 652	Wie so innig, möcht ich sagen	February; 1819	Text by Schlegel, F., from Abendröte II, 4; Two versions: 1st, in AGA, publ. 1842
653	653	(1842)	XX, 6 No. 355	IV, 12	Bertas Lied in der Nacht	Nacht umhüllt mit wehendem Flügel	February; 1819	Text by Grillparzer
654	654	(1842)	XX, 6 No. 356	IV, 12	An die Freunde	Im Wald, im Wald, da grabt mich ein	March 1819	Text by Mayrhofer
655	655	(1897)	XXI, 2 No. 13	VII/2, 2	Piano Sonata, D 655	C♯ minor	April 1819	Allegro; Fragment
656	656	(1867)	XVI; No. 35	III, 4 No. 45	Sehnsucht, D 656	Nur wer die Sehnsucht kennt	April 1819	Text by Goethe, from Wilhelm Meister's Apprenticeship (other settings: D 310, 359, 481 and 877 Nos. 1 & 4); For ttbbb
657	657	(1871)	XVI; No. 36	III, 4 No. 46	Ruhe, schönstes Glück der Erde	Ruhe, schönstes Glück der Erde	April 1819	For ttbb
658	658	(1895)	XX, 6 No. 364	IV, 12	Marie	Ich sehe dich in tausend Bildern	May 1819?	Text by Novalis, No. 15 from Geistliche Lieder
659	659	(1872)	XX, 6 No. 360	IV, 12	Hymn I	Wenige wissen das Geheimnis der Liebe	May 1819	Text by Novalis, No. 7 from Geistliche Lieder
660	660	(1872)	XX, 6 No. 361	IV, 12	Hymn II	Wenn ich ihn nur habe	May 1819	Text by Novalis, No. 5 from Geistliche Lieder
661	661	(1872)	XX, 6 No. 362	IV, 12	Hymn III	Wenn alle untreu werden	May 1819	Text by Novalis, No. 6 from Geistliche Lieder
662	662	(1872)	XX, 6 No. 363	IV, 12	Hymn IV	Ich sag' es jedem, daß er lebt	May 1819	Text by Novalis, No. 9 from Geistliche Lieder
663	663			IV, 12	Psalm 13 (12)	Ach Herr, wie lange willst du mein so ganz vergessen?	June 1819	Text by Mendelssohn, M., translating Psalm 13; Fragment
664	664	120p (1829)	X No. 10	VII/2, 2 No. 11	Piano Sonata, D 664	A major	Summer 1819 or 1825	Allegro moderato – Andante – Allegro
665	609							See D 609
666	666	158p (1849)	XIX; No. 3	III, 2a No. 12	Kantate zum Geburtstag des Sängers Johann Michael Vogl	Sänger, der von Herzen singet – Diese Berge sah'n dich blühen – Da saht ihr Oresten scheiden – Gott bewahr' dein teures Leben	10/08/1819	Text by Stadler, A.; For stb and piano; Publ. 1849, with different text, as Der Frühlingsmorgen
667	667	114p (1829)	VII, 1 No. 1	VI, 7 No. 6	Trout Quintet	A major	1819?	Allegro vivace – Andante – Scherzo – Theme and variations – Allegro giusto; For violin, viola, cello, double bass and piano; Reuses music of D 550
668	668	(1897)	XXI, 2 No. 6	VII/1, 5 No. 3	Overture, D 668	G minor	October; 1819	For piano duet
669	669	(1829)	XX, 6 No. 365	IV, 12	Beim Winde	Es traümen die Wolken	October; 1819	Text by Mayrhofer
670	670	165p,2 (1862)	XX, 6 No. 366	IV, 12	Die Sternennächte	In monderhellten Nächten	October; 1819	Text by Mayrhofer; Two versions: 2nd is Op. posth. 165 No. 2
671	671	(1849)	XX, 6 No. 367	IV, 12	Trost, D 671	Hörnerklänge rufen klagend	October; 1819	Text by Mayrhofer
672	672	36,2 (1825) (1975)	XX, 6 No. 368	IV, 2a & b No. 5	Nachtstück	Wenn über Berge sich der Nebel breitet	October; 1819	Text by Mayrhofer; Two versions: 2nd is Op. 36 No. 2
673	673	165p,1 (1832) (1862)	XX, 6 No. 369	IV, 12	Die Liebende schreibt	Ein Blick von deinen Augen	October; 1819	Text by Goethe; Two versions: 1st publ. in 1832 – 2nd is Op. posth. 165 No. 1
674	674	(1850)	XX, 6 No. 370	IV, 12	Prometheus, D 674	Bedecke deinen Himmel, Zeus	October; 1819	Text by Goethe; For b and piano
675	675	34 (1825)	IX, 2 No. 8	VII/1, 5 No. 4	Overture, D 675	F major	November; 1819?	For piano duet
676	676	153p (1845) (1888)	XIV No. 3	I, 8	Salve Regina, D 676, a.k.a. Drittes Offertorium	A major Salve Regina	November; 1819	Text: Salve Regina (other settings: D 27, 106, 223, 386 and 811); For s and orchestra; Shortened in 1st ed., Op. posth. 153
677	677	(1848) (1895)	XX, 6 No. 371	IV, 12	Stanza from "Die Götter Griechenlands"	Schöne Welt, wo bist du?	November; 1819	Text by Schiller; Two versions: 2nd publ. in 1848
678	678	(1875) (1887)	XIII, 2 No. 5	I, 3	Mass No. 5	A♭ major Kyrie – Gloria – Credo – Sanctus & Benedictus – Agnus Dei	Nov. 1819– Sept. 1822	Text: Mass ordinary (other settings: D 24E, 31, 45, 49, 56, 66, 105, 167, 324, 452, 755 and 950); For satbSATB and orchestra; Two versions: 1st publ. in 1875 – 2nd in AGA

== Sources ==
Multi-volume editions, websites and catalogues

- Alte Gesamt-Ausgabe (AGA) = Franz Schubert's Works: Schubert, Franz (1884–1897). Johannes Brahms; Ignaz Brüll; Anton Door; Julius Epstein; Johann Nepomuk Fuchs; Josef Gänsbacher; Joseph Hellmesberger Sr.; Eusebius Mandyczewski (eds.). Franz Schubert's Werke: Kritisch durchgesehene Gesammtausgabe (in German). Leipzig: Breitkopf & Härtel. Reprints of several volumes by Kalmus and Dover Publications; Franz Schubert's Werke (Series I–XIX and XXI), Series XX, Revisionsbericht: Scores at the International Music Score Library Project
- Deutsch catalogue (D) = Schubert Thematic Catalogue:
  - Deutsch, Otto Erich; et al. (Donald R. Wakeling) (1951). Schubert: Thematic Catalogue of all his Works in Chronological Order (1st ed.). London: Dent. 1995 reprint, with errata correction: Deutsch, Otto Erich; et al. (Donald R. Wakeling) (1995). The Schubert Thematic Catalogue (Dover ed.). Mineola, N.Y.: Dover Publications. ISBN 0486286851.
  - Deutsch, Otto Erich (1978). Walther Dürr; Arnold Feil; Christa Landon [in German]; Werner Aderhold (eds.). Franz Schubert: Thematisches Verzeichnis seiner Werke in chronologischer Folge. New Schubert Edition (in German). Kassel: Bärenreiter. ISBN 9783761805718. ISMN 9790006305148.
    - Series VIII (Supplement)
    - Volume 4
- Hoboken catalogue (Hob.): "Joseph Haydn (1732–1809): Werke sortiert nach Hob (Hoboken-Verzeichnis, 1957-78)" (in German). Kaiserslautern: Klassika.
- Köchel catalogue (K.): "Wolfgang Amadeus Mozart (1756–1791): Werke sortiert nach KV^{6} (Köchel-Verzeichnis, 6. Auflage, 1964)" (in German). Kaiserslautern: Klassika.
- Neue Schubert-Ausgabe (NSA) = New Schubert Edition:
  - NSA scores: Schubert, Franz (1968–2019). International Schubert Association (Tübingen) (ed.). Franz Schubert (1797–1828): New Edition of the Complete Works (in German). Kassel: Bärenreiter. [over 80 volumes in eight series] Individual volumes:
    - NSA II, 15: Schubert, Franz; Neumann, Johann Philipp (2008). Jahrmärker, Manuela; Aigner, Thomas (eds.). Sacontala. New Schubert Edition (in German). Kassel: Bärenreiter. ISMN 9790006497294.
      - Series II (Stage Works), Vol. 15
    - NSA VIII, 4: See above Deutsch (1978)
  - NSA website: "New Schubert Edition". Tübingen: International Schubert Association.
- Schubert Online: "www.schubert-online.at: Schubert music manuscripts, first and early editions online". Vienna: Austrian Academy of Sciences (ÖAW).
- The LiederNet Archive: Ezust, Emily; et al. (LiederNet contributors). "Composer: Franz Peter Schubert (1797 - 1828)". Ontario: LiederNet Corporation.

Other

- Badura-Skoda, Eva; Branscombe, Peter, eds. (2008). Schubert Studies: Problems of Style and Chronology. Cambridge University Press. ISBN 0521088720.
  - Walther Dürr "Schubert's Songs and Their Poetry" pp. 1–24
  - Rufus Hallmark "Schubert's 'Auf dem Strom'" pp. 25–46
  - Elaine Brody "Schubert and Sulzer Revisited" pp. 47–60
  - Marius Flothuis "Schubert Revises Schubert" pp. 61–84
  - Elizabeth Norman McKay "Schubert as Composer of Operas" pp. 85–104
  - Peter Branscombe "Schubert and the Melodrama" pp. 105–142
  - Christoph Wolff "Schubert's 'Der Tod und dad Mädchen'" pp. 143–172
  - Peter Gülke on String Quintet D 956 pp. 173–186
  - Paul Badura-Skoda on Schubert's 'Great' C major Symphony pp. 187–208
  - Robert Winter "Paper Studies and the Future of Schubert Research" pp. 209–276
  - Eva Badura-Skoda "The Chronology of Schubert's Piano Trios" pp. 277–296
  - Reinhard Van Hoorickx "The Chronology of Schubert's Fragments and Sketches" pp. 297–326
  - Arnold Feil "Rhythm in Schubert" pp. 327–346
  - Alexander Weinmann on Leopold Puschl and Schubert's sojourn in Zseliz pp. 347–356
- Elsholz, Gunter (1982). Vogel, Reimut (ed.). Franz Schubert: Sinfonie in E-Dur 1825. Stuttgart: Goldoni. ISBN 3922044050. OCLC 987719669.
- Hilmar, Ernst; Jestremski, Margret, eds. (2004). Schubert-Enzyklopädie (in German). Vol. 1. Introduction by Alfred Brendel. Tutzing: Hans Schneider. ISBN 3795211557.
- Keefe, Simon P., ed. (2006). Mozart Studies. Cambridge University Press. ISBN 0521851025.
- Kube, Michael (2009). "Franz Schuberts Deutsche Trauermesse (D 621) als Problem der Text- und Stilkritik". In Mitterauer, Gertraud; Müller, Ulrich; Springeth, Margarete; Vitzthum, Verena (eds.). Was ist Textkritik?: Zur Geschichte und Relevanz eines Zentralbegriffs der Editionswissenschaft (in German). Walter de Gruyter. pp. 129–140. ISBN 3484970782.
- Mozart, Wolfgang Amadeus; Haydn, Joseph; Haydn, Michael (2008). Kircher, Armin (ed.). Chorbuch Mozart • Haydn VII: Kanonsammlung [Choral Collection Mozart • Haydn, Vol. VII: Canon Collection] (in German, Latin, English, and Italian). Stuttgart: Carus-Verlag. OCLC 274222567.
- Newbould, Brian (1999). Schubert: The Music and the Man. University of California Press. ISBN 0520219570.
- Reed, John (1997). The Schubert Song Companion. Manchester University Press. ISBN 1901341003.
- Van Hoorickx, Reinhard (1971). "Franz Schubert (1797–1828) List of the Dances in Chronological Order". Revue belge de Musicologie / Belgisch Tijdschrift voor Muziekwetenschap. 25 (1). Belgian Musicological Society: 68–97. doi:10.2307/3686180. ISSN 0771-6788. JSTOR 3686180.
- Van Hoorickx, Reinhard (1974–1976). "Thematic Catalogue of Schubert's Works: New Additions, Corrections and Notes". Revue belge de Musicologie / Belgisch Tijdschrift voor Muziekwetenschap. 28–30. Belgian Musicological Society: 136–171. doi:10.2307/3686053. ISSN 0771-6788. JSTOR 3686053.
