= Anselm Hüttenbrenner =

Austrian composer (1794-1868)

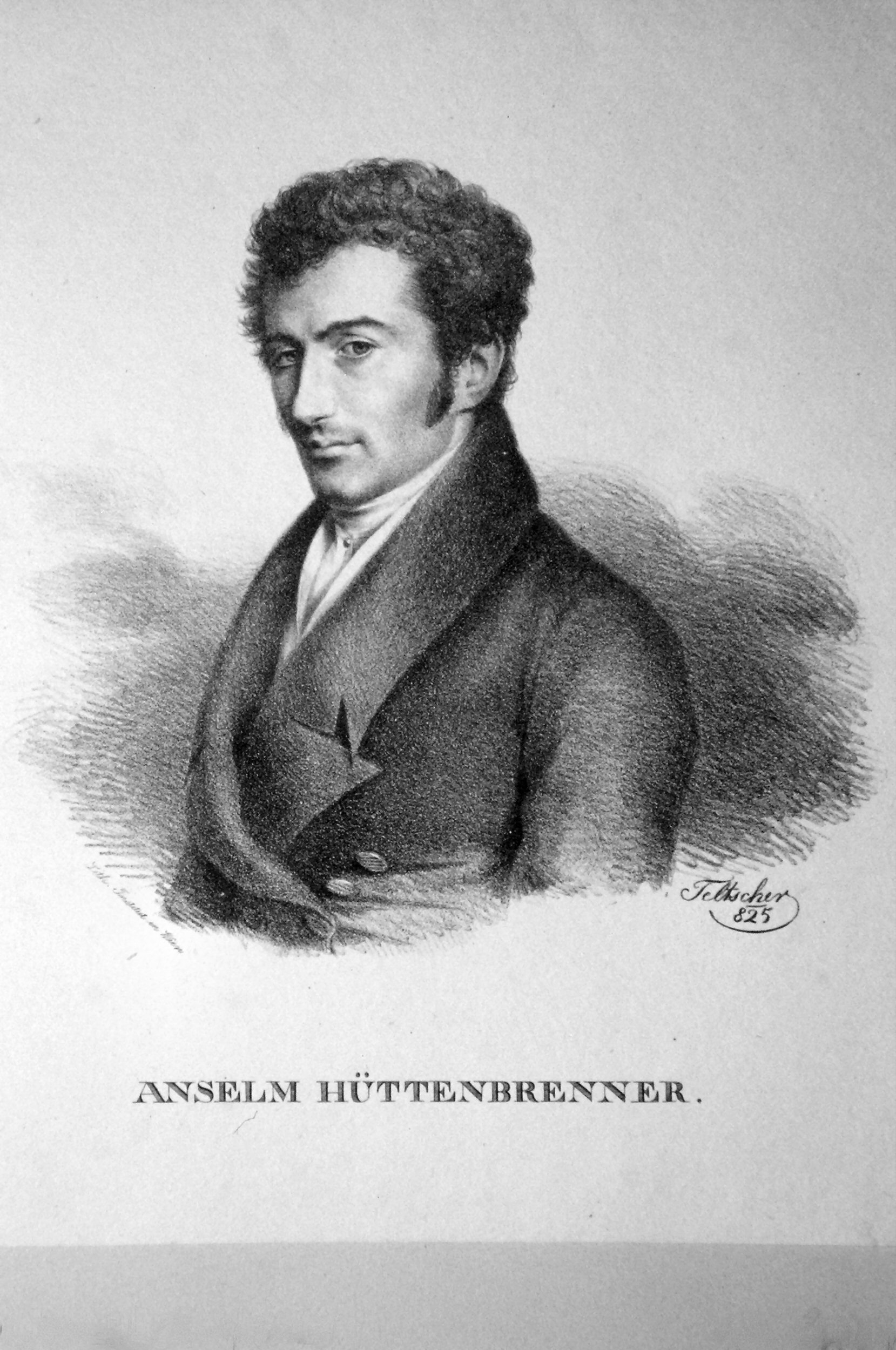
Anselm Hüttenbrenner by Josef Eduard Teltscher, 1825

Anselm Hüttenbrenner (13 October 1794 – 5 June 1868) was an Austrian composer. He was on friendly terms with both Ludwig van Beethoven—he was one of only two people known to be present at his bedside at the time of his death—and Franz Schubert, of whom his recollections constitute a probably unreliable document in Schubertian biographical studies.

== Life ==
Anselm Hüttenbrenner was born in Graz on 13 October 1794, the son of a wealthy landowner. He attended the Graz Lyzeum and studied law at the University of Graz, but was also composing music at this time. Count Moritz von Fries (1777–1826) was impressed with his ability as a pianist, and following the Count's advice, Hüttenbrenner left in April 1815 for Vienna to study under Antonio Salieri. His first published works (for piano and Lieder) began to appear shortly afterwards, and the String Quartet (Op. 3) came out in 1816. He briefly returned to Graz in 1818, but was back in Vienna the following year, earning a living in a government office. In 1821 Hüttenbrenner inherited the family estate and married.

Years later, he visited Beethoven on his deathbed, who greeted him with the words "I am not worthy of your visiting me". He was also present on 26 March 1827, at the time of Beethoven's death, when the only other person present was Beethoven's housekeeper. In commemoration of the moment, Hüttenbrenner cut a lock of Beethoven's hair, now in Graz together with Beethoven's family archival book in the Fux Conservatory.

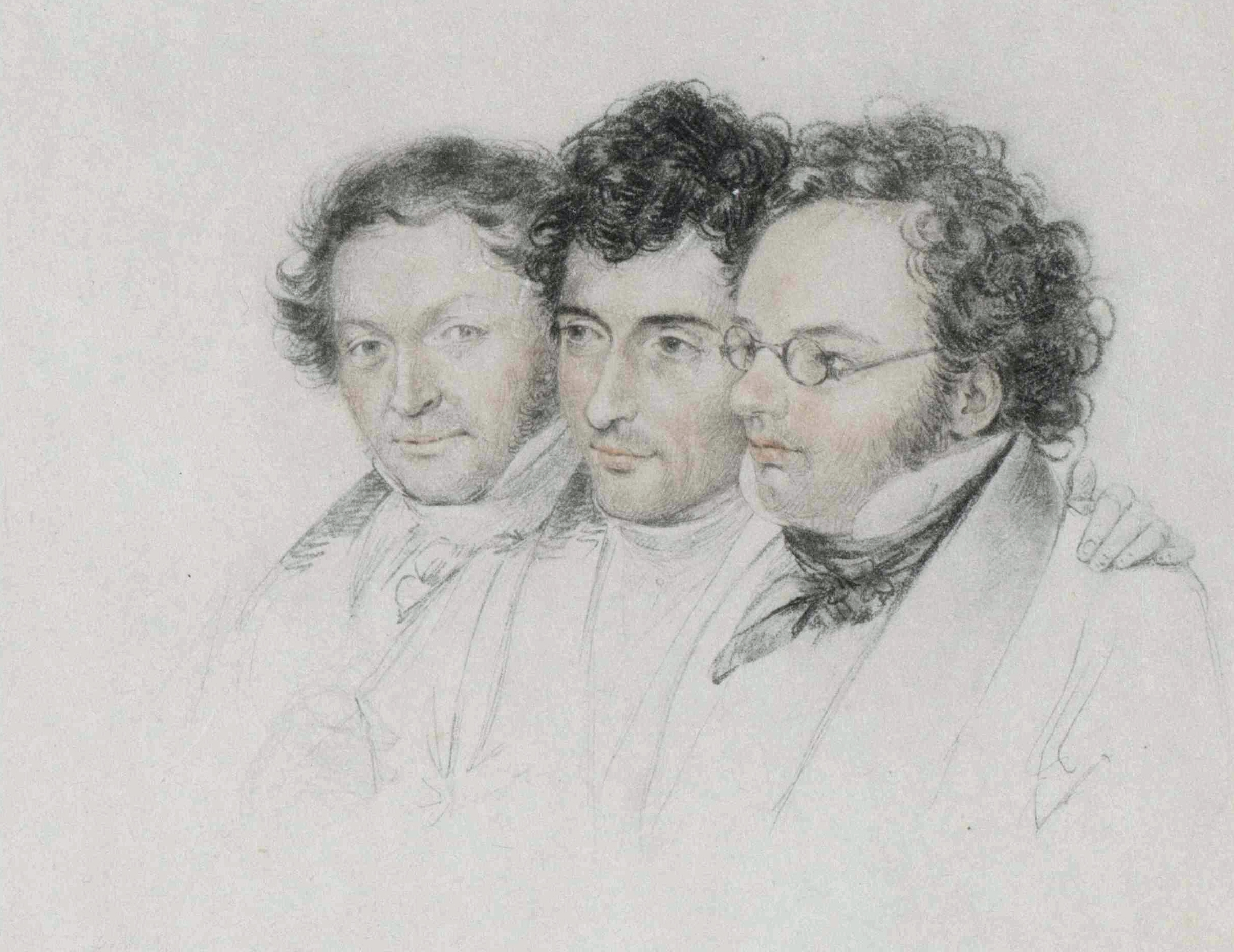
Three friends (Johann Baptist Jenger, Hüttenbrenner and Franz Schubert) by Josef Eduard Teltscher, 1827

Schubert sent the manuscript of his Unfinished Symphony to Hüttenbrenner, via Hüttenbrenner's brother Josef, around 1823. The manuscript remained with Hüttenbrenner until Johann Herbeck visited him in Ober-Andritz near Graz in 1865, and took the score away with him back to Vienna, where he conducted the first performance in December 1865. Hüttenbrenner held the post of director of the Steiermärkischer Musikverein from 1825 to 1829. His Requiem in C minor was performed at Schubert's memorial service on 23 December 1828.

He was a follower of Jakob Lorber and from 1840 he participated actively in the transcription of what was allegedly dictated to Lorber by God.

Hüttenbrenner died in Ober-Andritz on 5 June 1868 at the age of 73.

== Works, editions and recordings ==
Of Hüttenbrenner's works in manuscript, some are lost, but the majority remained with his descendants until their 2007 donation to the University Library of University of Music and Performing Arts Graz, Austria; they can be examined on site, with all items listed in the University Library's searchable online catalog. His works are considered very rich in melody, somewhat operatic.

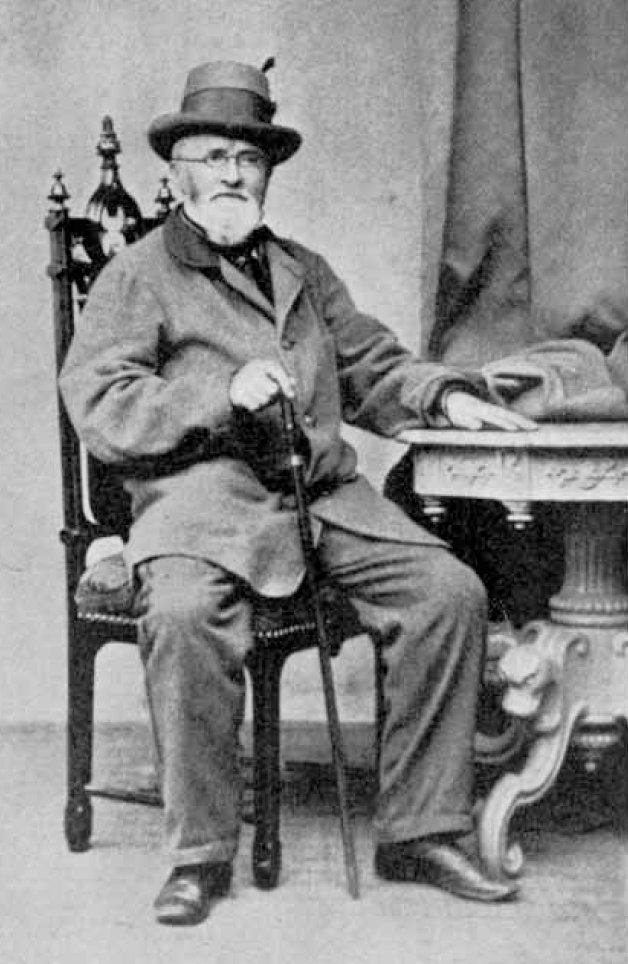
A photograph of Hüttenbrenner

- 27 sacred works, including 6 Masses and 3 Requiems
- 4 operas, including Lenore and Oedipus at Colonos
- 258 songs for voice and piano
- 133 quartets for male voices
- 159 choral works for male voices
- 20 orchestral works, including 2 symphonies
- 13 chamber works, including 2 string quartets and a string quintet
- 60 works for piano, 2 hands
- 23 works for piano, 4 hands
- 8 arrangements of other composers' works

=== Printed editions ===
- Songs for voice and piano, Vol. 1, edited by Ulf Bästlein, Alice and Michael Aschauer, 2008, Accolade Musikverlag (www.accolade.de): ACC.1209a
- Songs for voice and piano, Vol. 2, edited by Ulf Bästlein, Alice and Michael Aschauer, 2008, Accolade Musikverlag (www.accolade.de): ACC.1209b

=== Recordings ===
- Die innere Welt (Lieder); Ulf Bästlein (bass-baritone), Charles Spencer (piano), Gramola 2009
