= Prometheus (art song) =

Song composed by Franz Schubert

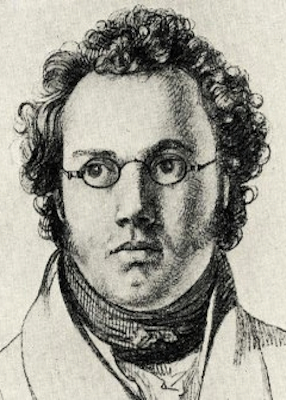
1821 drawing of Franz Schubert by Josef Kupelwieser

"Prometheus", D. 674, is an intensely dramatic art song composed by Franz Schubert in October 1819 to a poem of the same name by Johann Wolfgang von Goethe.

== Music ==
The lied was written for bass voice in the key of B♭ major, but the key moves repeatedly through various major to minor tonalities, ending in C major. Goethe's dramatic declamation by Prometheus would be set again, with very different effect, by Hugo Wolf, "with his alternations of ariosos and recitatives, Schubert created a miniature oratorio", observes Edward F. Kravitt.

Among many other lieder by Schubert, Max Reger also created an orchestration for "Prometheus".

== Recordings ==
Voice and piano
Schubert: Goethe-Lieder, Thomas Quasthoff (bass-baritone), Charles Spencer (piano), RCA Records, 1995
Schubert: Goethe-Lieder, Dietrich Fischer-Dieskau (baritone), Jörg Demus (piano), Deutsche Grammophon, 1999
Schubert: Goethe-Lieder, Vol. 1, Ulf Bästlein (bass-baritone), Stefan Laux (piano), Naxos Records, 2000

Voice and orchestra (Max Reger)
Schubert arranged by Reger: Songs, Stuttgart Chamber Orchestra, Dennis Russell Davies (conductor), Dietrich Henschel (baritone), MD&G Records, 1998
Schubert arr. Reger: Orchestral Songs, Klaus Mertens (baritone), Camilla Nylund (soprano), NDR Radiophilharmonie Hannover, Werner Andreas Albert (conductor), cpo Records, 1998
Schubert: Lieder With Orchestra, Thomas Quasthoff (bass-baritone), Anne Sofie von Otter (mezzo-soprano), Chamber Orchestra of Europe, Claudio Abbado (conductor), Deutsche Grammophon, 2003
