= Teltscher =

Teltscher is a toponymic surname of German origin meaning inhabitant of Telč (German: Teltsch), a town in the Czech Republic. People with this surname include:

- Eliot Teltscher (born 1959), retired professional American tennis player
- Josef Eduard Teltscher (born 1801), Austrian painter and lithographer
- Mark Teltscher (active from 2005), English poker player
