= Janina Baechle =

German operatic mezzo-soprano

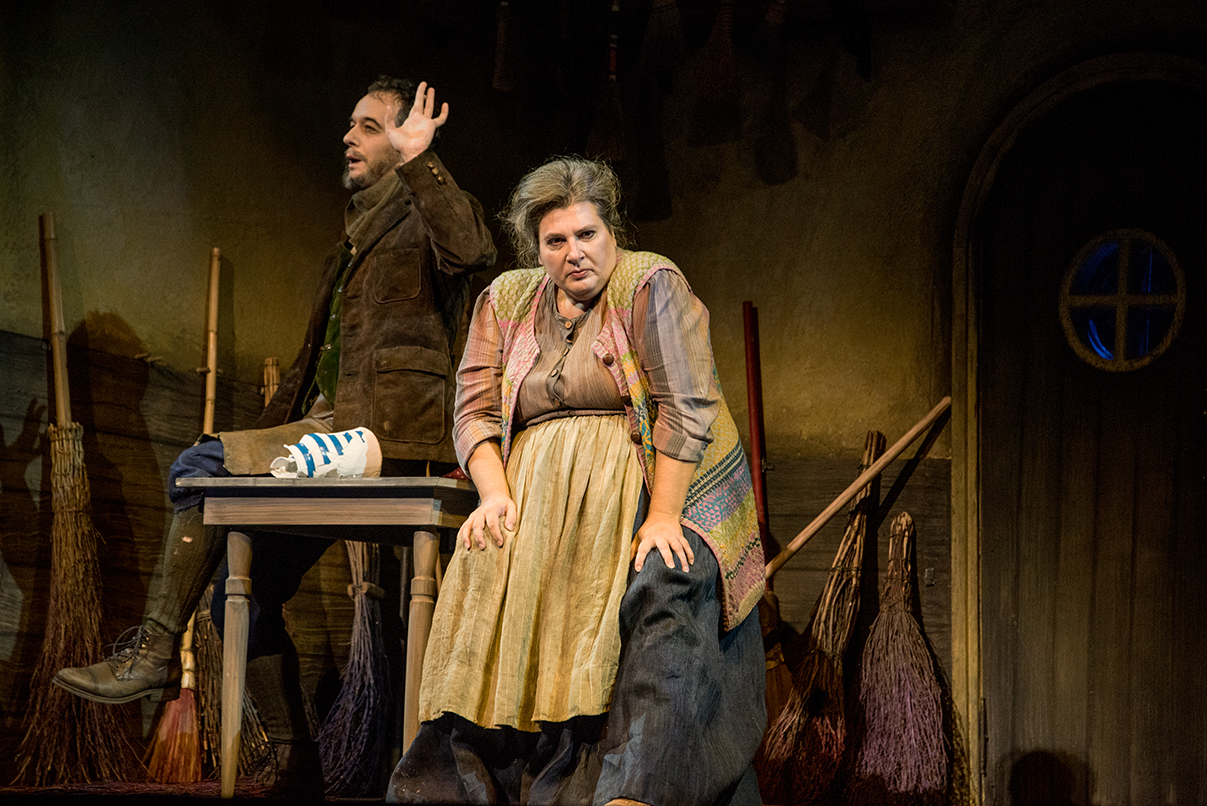
- Baechle as Gertrud in 2015
- Born: 1959 (age 65–66); Esslingen am Neckar, West Germany
- Education: Hochschule der Künste Berlin
- Occupations: Operatic mezzo-soprano; Academic teacher
- Organizations: Staatstheater Stuttgart; Vienna State Opera; Musikhochschule Stuttgart
- Awards: Deutscher Musikwettbewerb

Janina Baechle (born 1969) is a German operatic mezzo-soprano. She was a member of the Vienna State Opera from 2004 to 2011, and has appeared internationally.

== Life ==
Baechle was born in Hamburg and grew up in Southern Germany. She studied musicology and history at the University of Hamburg, and at the same time voice at the Musikhochschule Hamburg, with Brigitte Fassbaender, among others. She made her operatic debut in Hamburg and then was engaged at the Staatstheater Braunschweig and the Staatsoper Hannover. She has been a member of the Vienna State Opera from the 2004/05 season for six years, where she appeared as Mrs. Quickly in Verdi's Falstaff, Ulrica in Un ballo in maschera, Herodias in Salome by Richard Strauss, Annina in Der Rosenkavalier, Margret in Berg's Wozzeck and Brigitta in Korngold's Die tote Stadt. She performed the role of the Marquise de Birkenfeld in Donizetti's La fille du régiment in 2007, alongside Natalie Dessay, Juan Diego Flórez and Montserrat Caballé. Her Wagner roles include Mary in Der fliegende Holländer, Ortrud in Lohengrin), Brangäne in Tristan und Isolde, Erda, Siegrune, Fricka and Waltraute in Der Ring des Nibelungen, and the Celestial Voice and Second Knappe in Parsifal. She also performed at the house as Buryja in Janáček's Jenůfa and as Ježibaba in Dvořák's Rusalka.

Baechle appeared as a guest as Ortrud at the Teatro Colón in Buenos Aires, as Fricka at the San Francisco Opera, as Mrs. Quickly and Brangäne at the Théâtre du Capitole, as Ježibaba at the Opéra National de Lyon, and as Gaea in Daphne ) and as Brangäne at the Liceu in Barcelona. She sang the title role in the world premiere of Bruno Mantovanis Akhmatova at the Paris Opera in 2011. She was Ortrud and Brangäne at the Semperoper in Dresden, and both Ježibaba and Ortrud at the Bavarian State Opera in Munich. She has performed and recorded with conductor Christian Thielemann.

Baechle sings a broad repertoire of lieder, with pianists Markus Hadulla and Charles Spencer. She appeared in Mahler's Lieder eines fahrenden Gesellen and Schönberg's Gurre-Lieder in notable concert halls.

== Award ==
- 2006: Eberhard-Waechter-Medaille

== Recordings ==
- Johannes Brahms: Wie Melodien zieht es mir, with Hadulla
- Gustav Mahler: Urlicht, with Hadulla
- Franz Liszt: Was Liebe sei, with Spencer (Marsyas)
- Chansons Grises, lieder by Reynaldo Hahn, Alexander von Zemlinsky, Lili Boulanger, Darius Milhaud and Alma Mahler, with Spencer (Marsyas)

Complete operas

- Der Evangelimann, 2006
- Moses und Aron
- Der Ring des Nibelungen, conducted by Christian Thielemann
- Parsifal, conducted by Thielemann
- Rusalka
- Tristan und Isolde, conducted by Franz Welser-Möst (Orfeo)
