= Georg von Hofmann =

Austrian libretist

Georg von Hofmann (29 October 1769 (According to other sources: 1771) – 7 May 1845) was an Austrian occasional poet.

== Life and work ==
Born in Vienna, Hofmann was secretary at the Vienna Theater am Kärntnertor and, as successor to Georg Friedrich Treitschke, opera poet there. He translated many foreign-language opera libretti into German. He wrote two poems for which Franz Schubert composed the music in 1820: Die Zauberharfe (D 644) and Die Zwillingsbrüder (D 647). Hofmann is also said to have provided the textual basis for the alleged rehearsal work with which, according to Anton Schindler, Schubert applied for a vice-conductorship at the Kärntnertortheater in 1826, which failed due to the conduct of the prima donna Nanette Schechner. Otto Erich Deutsch, however, describes this incident as implausible.

Hofmann died in Vienna at the age of 75.

== Work ==
=== Schauspiele ===
- Ludwig und Louise, or: Der 9. Thermidor (Schauspiel) 1815
- Landleben (Lustspiel) 1817
- Das Jagdschloß (Lustspiel) 1819
- Ja! (Lustspiel) 1825

=== Libretti ===
- Helene (opera, music by Adalbert Gyrowetz) 1816
- Das Rosenhütchen (Große Zauberoper, music by Carl Blum) 1819
- Die Pagen des Herzogs von Vendôme (opera, music by Carl Blum) 1820
- Die Zwillingsbrüder (posse, music by Franz Schubert) 1820
- Die Zauberharfe (Zauberspiel, music by Franz Schubert) 1820
- Der Zauberspruch (opera after Carlo Gozzi's Der Rabe, music by Johann Peter Pixis) 1822
- Die Ochsenmenuette (Singspiel, music after Joseph Haydn by Ignaz von Seyfried) 1823.
- Die Prise Tabak, or Die Vettern als Nebenbuhler (Singspiel) 1825
- Der Haushofmeister (Singspiel) 1825
- Sonderbare Laune, or Sie sind doch verheiratet (Singspiel) 1825
- Die Räuber und der Sänger (operetta) 1830
- Sylva, or Die Macht des Gesanges (opera, music by Karl August Krebs) 1830
- Der Taucher (romantic opera, music by Conradin Kreutzer) 1834

=== Translations ===
- Olympia (opera; translation; libretto by Michel Dieulafoy and Charles Brifaut, music by Gaspare Spontini) 1825
- Der blinde Harfner (opera; translation; libretto by Michel Dieulafoy, music by Adalbert Gyrowetz) 1828
- Semiramis (opera, translation; libretto by Gaetano Rossi, music by Gioachino Rossini) 1833
- Die Ballnacht (Grand Opera; translation with Ignaz von Seyfried, libretto by Eugène Scribe, music by Daniel-François-Esprit Auber) 1835
- Die Jüdin (grand opera, translation, libretto by Eugène Scribe, music by Jacques Halévy) 1836
