= Carl Blum =

German singer, librettist, actor, director, guitarist and composer

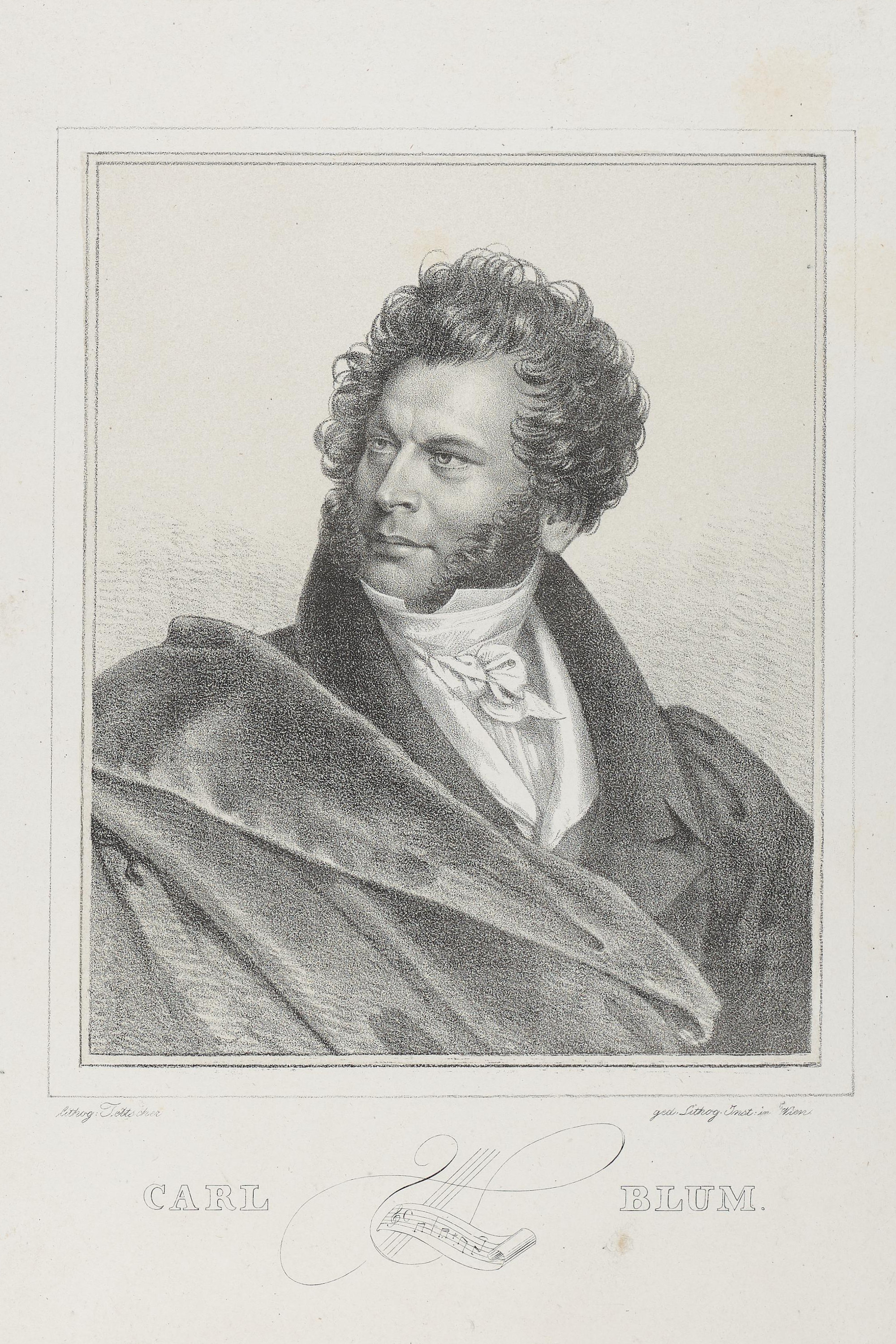
Carl Blum, Lithograph by Joseph Teltscher

Carl Wilhelm August Blum (1786 – 2 July 1844) was a German singer, librettist, stage actor, director, guitarist and opera and song composer. Philip J. Bone wrote that Blum was "a universal genius, uniting in one person the poet, the dramatist, composer, singer and performer." He was composer to the Court of the King of Prussia.

He has been confused with or named incorrectly in literature as Karl Ludwig Blum.

== History and career ==
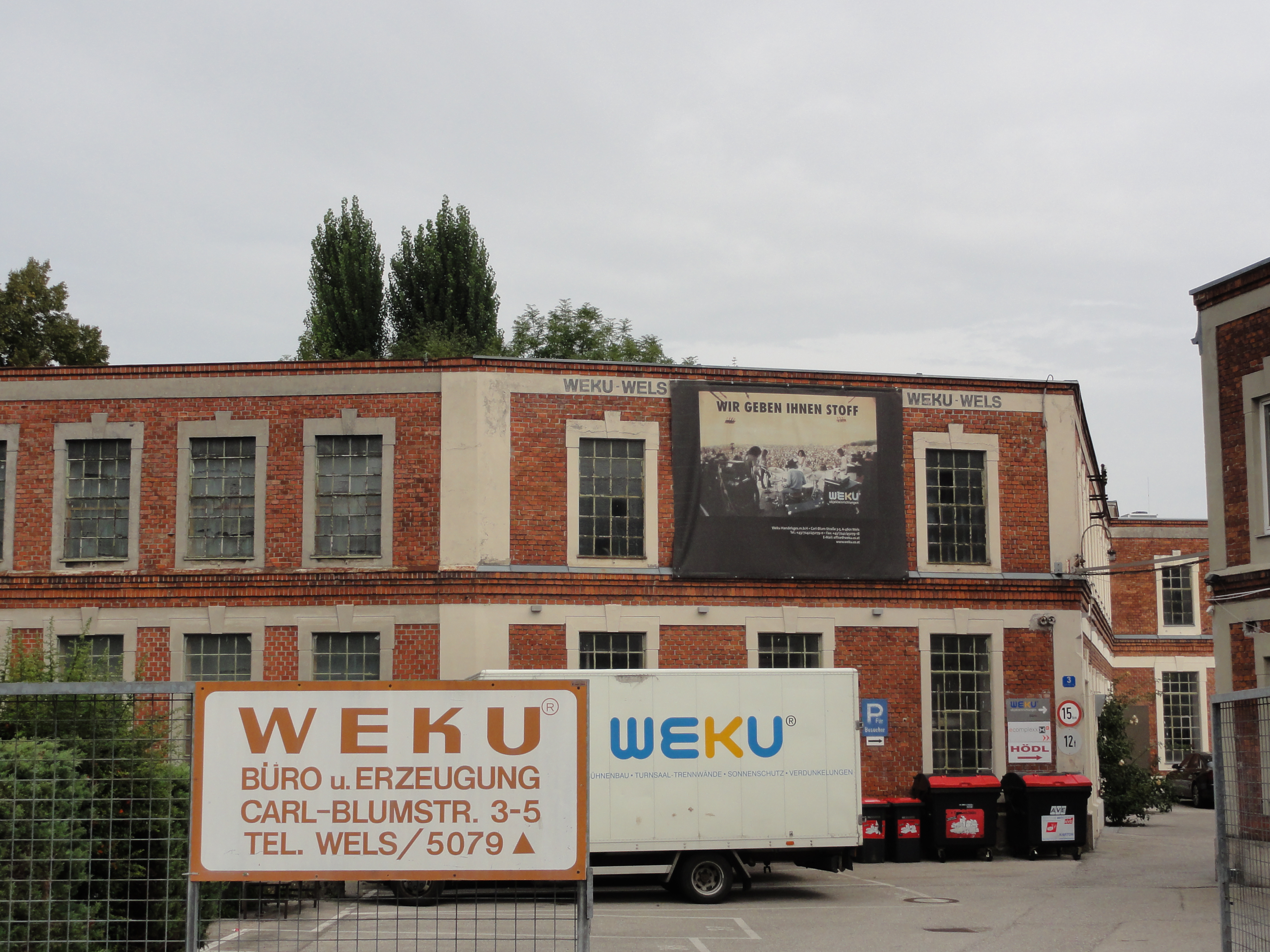
Carl Blum workshop, built in 1874 (after the musician's death). Located on Carl Blum Straße (Carl Blum Street).

Blum studied guitar from age 15. He joined a group of traveling comedians in 1805, directed by Quandt, working as a singer and guitarist. After leaving the group for more musical study, he joined the Königsberger Theater in Berlin in 1810, working with C. von Weber. He became guitar instructor to the royal princesses and produced his first opera, Claudine de Villa Bella. In 1817, he went to Vienna and became a student to Antionio Salieri. Here he composed the opera Das Rosen-Hütchen (The Little Hat of Roses), which was performed 39 times.

In 1820, the King of Prussia appointed him composer to the court, after his success in Vienna. There he taught guitar to German princesses.

He visited Paris to study the styles of Boieldieu, Cherubini and Auber. After visiting London, he returned to Berlin in 1822, working there as the director of the royal theatre. In 1827, he directed the Königsstadt Theater. That same year he went to Italy and did no more theater work, but concentrated on composing. His opera The Orphan of Russia was performed in 1829.

He introduced comic operas or vaudevilles to Germany, and his were preferred by Germans.

Among his successful songs were compositions for the Austrian soprano Pauline Anna Milder-Hauptmann.

== Books ==
- Jucunde: Dramatisches Taschenbuch für 1836 (Berlin: Verlag von Theod. Chr. Fr. Enslin, 1835)
- Die Musik: Anleitung, sich die nöthigen Kenntnisse zu verschaffen, um über alle Gegenstände der Musik richtige Urtheile fällen zu können; Handbuch für Freunde und Liebhaber dieser Kunst; nach dem französischen Werke des Herrn Fetis "La musique mise à la portée de tout le monde" (Berlin: Schlesinger, 1830)

== Stage works ==
=== Original works ===
(mostly to his own libretto)

- Karl der Zweite – Die Flucht nach Frankreich (f.p. Königsberg, 19 January 1812)
- arias and songs to Zoraide, oder Die Mauren in Granada. Lyric drama in 3 acts op. 65 (f.p. Berlin, 7 May 1817)
- Der Schiffskapitän, oder Die Unbefangenen (f.p. Berlin, 8 June 1817)
- Fortunata (f.p. Berlin, 5 June 1818)
- arias and songs to the comic magic opera Das Rosenhütchen, in 3 acts (f.p. Vienna, 28 June 1819)
- Der Eremit von St. Avella (f.p. Berlin 24 April 1822)
- Gänserich und Gänschen. Vaudeville in 1 Act (f.p. Berlin, 25 October 1822)
- arias and songs to the vaudeville Ein Stündchen vor dem Potsdammer Thore, in 1 act (Berlin, c.1825)
- Der Fischer und der Vogelsteller (f.p. Berlin, 27 February 1825)
- Der Bramin(e), magic opera in 1 act (after Charles-Gaspard Delestre-Poirson) (f.p. Berlin, 22 December 1826)
- Aladin die Wunderlampe (f.p. Berlin, 26 July 1828)
- Doctor Johannes Faust, der wundertätige Magus der Nordens (libretto: Karl von Holtei) (f.p. Berlin, 10 January 1829)
- Die Liebe in der Mädchenschule (f.p. Potsdam, 12 April 1830)
- Friedrich August in Madrid, drama in 5 acts (Leipzig: Leo, 1832)
- Mary, Max und Michel, comic opera in 1 act op. 133 (Berlin: M. Westphal.; E. Bote & G. Bock, 1836)
- arias and songs to the opera buffa Bergamo, in 2 acts (Berlin: Bloch, 1837)
- Der Ball zu Ellerbrunn (after "La Fiera" by Alberto Nota) (Berlin: Bloch, n.d. [1835]).
- Die Herrin von der Else, drama in 5 acts (after James Sheridan Knowles)'s "The Hunchback") (Berlin: Bloch, 1837)
- words to the vocal numbers in Der Spiegel des Tausendschön, burlesque in 1 act (Hamburg: Wörmer junr's. Nachf., 1842)
- Schwärmerei nach der Mode, in: Theater, vol. 3 (1844)
- Erziehungs-Resultate, oder Guter und schlechter Ton, comic play (Berlin: Schlesinger, 1844)
- Tempora mutantur, oder: Die gestrengen Herren (after Jean Bayard) (Berlin: Schlesinger, 1844)
- Die Mäntel, oder Der Schneider in Lissabon, comic play in 1 act (Berlin: Bloch, 1864)
- Ein Herr und eine Dame, comic play in 1 act (Leipzig: Reclam, 1876)
- Ich bleibe ledig, comic play in 3 acts (Leipzig: Reclam, 1875)
- Lisette, oder Borgen macht glücklich, comic play in 1 act (Berlin: Bloch, n.d.)

=== Edited and translated ===
- arias and songs to the vaudeville Canonikus Ignaz Schuster, in 1 act (after Florent Carton Dancourt) (f.p. Berlin, 5 June 1818)
- arias and songs to the vaudeville-burlesque Der Bär und der Bassa, in 1 act (after Eugène Scribe) (f.p. Berlin, 15 December 1821)
- arias and songs to the opera Die Pagen des Herzogs von Vendôme, in 2 acts (libretto after Michel Dieulafoy) by Georg von Hofmann) (f.p.; Vienna, 12 January 1820)
- Die Nachtwandlerin, singspiel in 2 acts (after Scribe) (f.p. Berlin, 24 June 1822)
- some marches and choral numbers to the romantic opera Libussa, in 3 acts by Joseph Carl Bernard, music by Conradin Kreutzer (Berlin, 1823)
- arias and songs to the singspiel Die Heirath im zwölften Jahre, in 1 act (after Scribe) (f.p. Berlin, 7 April 1823)
- Aline, Königin von Golconda, grand ballet in 3 acts by Jean Pierre Aumer (Berlin, c.1825)
- arias and songs to the singspiel in 2 scenes Der schönste Tag des Lebens (after Scribe's Le Plus beau jour de la vie (Berlin, 1826)
- Herr von Ich, comic play in 1 act (after Pierre de Longchamps) (Berlin, 1828)
- Die Nachtwandlerin, singspiel in 2 acts (after Scribe) (Berlin: Enslin, 1830)
- Riquet der Haarbüschel, fairy opera in 2 acts (after Nicolas Brazier's Riquet à la houpe and a fairy tale from 1001 nights (Berlin: Enslin, 1830)
- vocal numbers to Fra Diavolo, oder Das Gasthaus in Terracina, comic opera in 3 acts (music by Auber, text by Scribe) (Weimar, 1832)
- Das laute Geheimniß, romantic comic play in 5 acts (after Carlo Gozzi); in: Theater, vol. 1 (1839)
- Vicomte von Létorières, comic play in 3 acts (after Jean-François Bayard) (Berlin: Schlesinger, 1844)

=== Works for guitar ===
- Exercises pour la guitare, three volumes (Leipzig: Breitkopf & Härtel)
- Marche, danse et marmotte des Savoyards. Divertissement pour la guitare (Copenhagen: C.C. Lose)
- Divertissements progressifs pour la guitare, vol. 1 op. 16; vol. 2 op. 17 (Leipzig: Breitkopf & Härtel, c.1817)
- Studien für die Gitarre op. 44 (Berlin: Schlesinger)
- Le Bouquet. Trois Nocturnes for flute, violin and guitar op. 64. Contains: 1. La Rose; 2. La Fleur de Lys; 3. La Violette (Mainz: B. Schott's Söhne)
- Grand potpourri brillant pour la guitare seule de l'opera 'La Muette' de Portici op. 98 (Berlin: Schlesinger)
- Die Tänzerinnen. 3 Rondoletten for violin and flute with an accompaniment of the piano or the guitar op. 122. Also published as Le Ballerine. Contains: 1. La Villanella; 2. La Cittadina; 3. La Straniera (Leipzig: Breitkopf & Härtel, c.1832)
- Sérénade pour flute et guitare (Vienna: Pietro Mechetti)
- 'Der Freischütz' von Carl Maria von Weber, mit Begleitung der Guitarre eingerichtet von Carl Blum (Berlin: Schlesinger)
- Der Schiffskapitän, oder Die Unbefangenen. Vaudeville von Carl Blum, arranged as a trio for flute, violin and guitar by I.H.C. Bornhardt (Braunschweig: Musikalisches Magazine auf der Höhe)

=== Other compositions ===
- Gesaenge ernsten und launigen Inhalts für 2 Tenor und 2 Bassstimmen op. 22 (Leipzig: Breitkopf und Härtel, c.1818)
