= Johann Baptist Jenger =

Austrian composer (1793–1856)

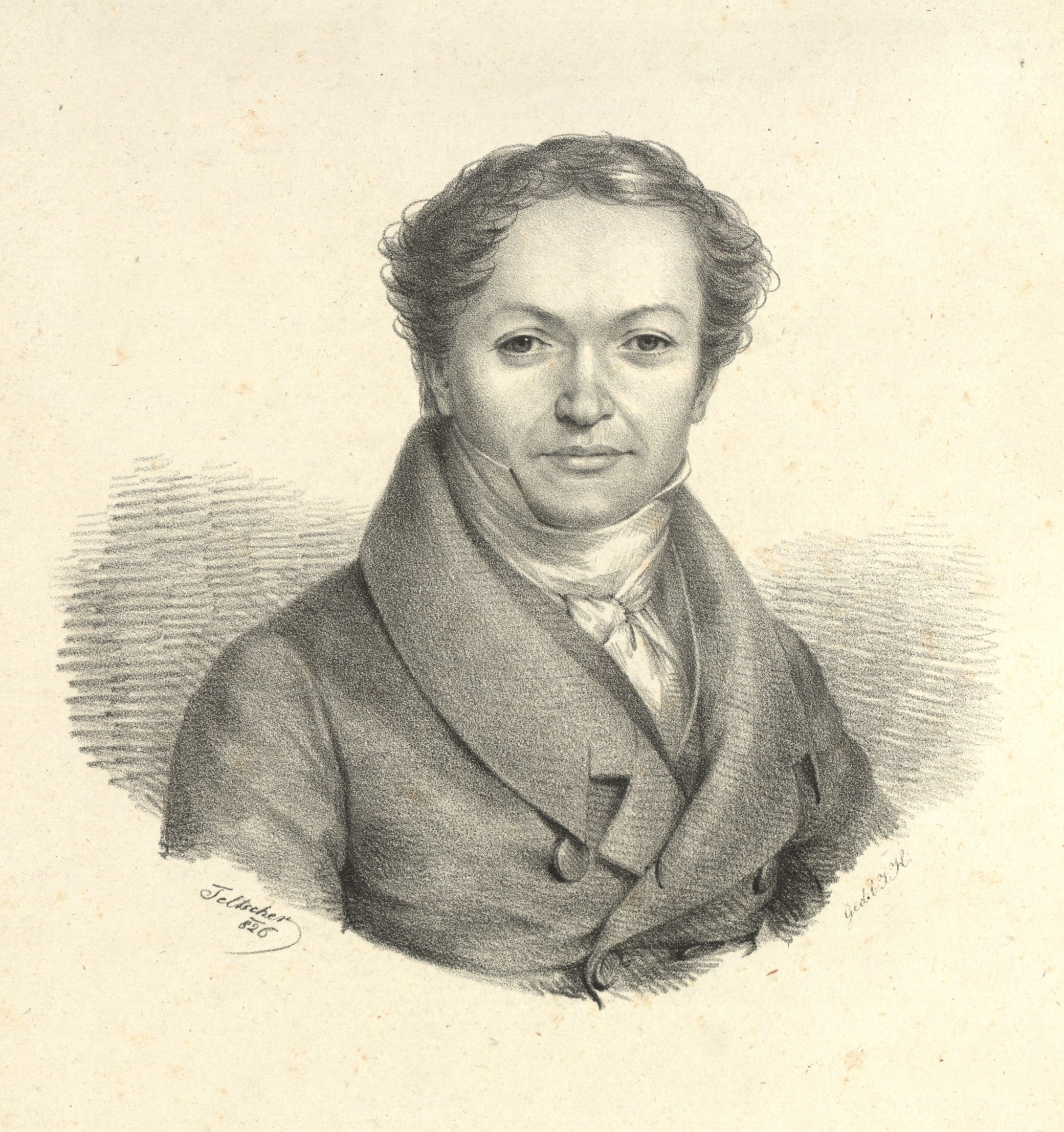
Lithograph of Jenger by Josef Eduard Teltscher, 1826

Johann Baptist Jenger (March 23, 1793 in Kirchhofen near Freiburg – March 30, 1856 in Vienna) was an Austrian composer, musician, secretary of the Steiermärkischen Musikvereins (Styrian Musical Society) and member of the board of the Gesellschaft der Musikfreunde (Society of Music Lovers) in Vienna.
