= Ulf Bästlein =

German bass-baritone

Ulf Bästlein (born 1959 in Flensburg, Schleswig-Holstein) is a German bass-baritone and doctor of philology (Germanist and classical philologist). Bästlein attended lessons for singing at the University of Music and Performing Arts Graz.

== Recordings ==
- 1990: Lieder nach Gedichten von Heinrich Heine (Schubert, Mendelssohn Bartholdy, Schumann, Heller u. a.), piano: Stefan Laux, audite 97.423
- 1994: Rimbaud-Lieder (Krása), Ensemble Aventure, Ars Musici AM 1104-2
- 1994: Fauré Requiem und Missa sacra (Schumann), conductor: Winfried Toll, Camerata und Camerata Vocale Freiburg, Ars Musici AM 232177
- 1995: Winterreise, songcycle by Schubert, piano: Stefan Laux, Ars Musici AM 1126-2
- 1996: Sollst sanft in meinen Armen schlafen Lieder zu den Themen ‚Nacht’ und ‚Tod’ (Schubert), piano: Stefan Laux, Ars Musici: AM 1157-2
- 1998: Trunken müssen wir alle sein: Weinlieder aus drei Jahrhunderten (Meyerbeer, Schubert, Schumann, Wolf, Lortzing, Liszt, Chopin, Schoeck, Eisler e.g., piano: Stefan Laux, Ars Musici: AM 1237-2
- 1998: Il Gedeone (Nicola Antonio Porpora), conductor: Martin Haselböck, Wiener Akademie, Musica Imperialis, Partie des Ioas, cpo 999 615-2
- 1999: Goethe Lieder (Schubert) piano: Stefan Laux, Deutsche-Schubert-Lied-Edition 3, Naxos 8.554665
- 1999: Neunte Symphonie (Beethoven), conductort

Jos van Immerseel, Anima Aeterna Symphonieorchester und Chor, Sony Classical, SK 61800 0618002003

- 2000: Die schöne Magelone (Brahms), piano: Dietmar Löffler, recitant: Barbara Auer, cordaria, CACD 558
- 2001: Joseph I., Ferdinand III., Leopold I.: Sacred Works, conductor: Martin Haselböck, Wiener Akademie, Musica Imperialis, Bass-Partien, cpo 999 681-2
- 2002: Aci e Galatea (Johann Gottlieb Naumann), conductor: Frieder Bernius, Barockorchester Stuttgart, Kammerchor Stuttgart, Partie des Orgonte, Orfeo C 222 022 H
- 2004: Lieder after poems by Theodor Storm (Reutter, Brahms, Berg, Schoeck, Schreker, Marx, Détlefsen u. a.), piano: Charles Spencer, Dabringhaus and Grimm, MDG 603 1234-2
- 2004: Dichterliebe und Kerner-Lieder (Schumann), piano: Stefan Laux, Hänssler Classic, CD 98.452
- 2006: Die Zauberflöte (Mozart), conductor: György Györiványi Ráth, Hungarian State Opera Orchestra, Partie des Sprechers, Vox Artis VA 006
- 2006: Leiden und Tod unseres Herrn und Heilands Jesus Christus: Eine Passion: 2003, (Michael Radulescu): conductor: Michael Radulescu, Domkantorei und Domorchester Graz, Christusworte, Ersteinspielung.
- 2006: Hausschatz deutscher Dichtung: Gedichte und Balladen mit Musik aus zwei Jahrhunderten, Speakers: F. Arnold, C. Brückner, M. Carrière, U. Matthes, C. Rode, J. Sachau, A. Thalbach, D. Wolters, Lieder (F. Schubert and R. Schumann) sung by U. Bästlein, Th. Bauer, S. Bluth, H. Hagegård, W. Holzmair, L. Russel, T. Takács, AUDIOBUCH Verlag Freiburg i Br., Katalog.-Nr.: ISBN 978-3-89964-214-8 ISBN 3-89964-214-7, Best.-Nr. 64214
- 2007: Markus-Passion (C. Ph. E. Bach), conductor: Joshard Daus, Mendelssohn Symphonia, EuropaChorAkademie, Christusworte, first recording, Capriccio 60 132 WG: 31 4006408601326
- 2008: Friedhelm Döhl Edition (Vol. XI): chamber music - Lyrik: among others with Christiane Edinger (violin), James Tocco (piano), Friedhelm Döhl (piano): Celan-Lieder, first recording, Dreyer - Gaido, CD 21046
- 2009: Die Innere Welt: Lieder by Anselm Hüttenbrenner (first recording), piano: Charles Spencer, Gramola 98815
- 2010: König Salomon (Ludwig Meinardus): conductor Henning Münther, Buxtehude-Chor und Peter-Pauls-Kantorei, Sinfonietta Lübeck, euthentic media
- 2014: Und nie vernahm ich noch ein schöneres Lied von Glück und Sieg, piano: Sascha El Mouissi: Lieder after poems by Friedrich Hebbel: Pfitzner, Braunfels, Schoeck, Cornelius, Draeseke, Schillings, Schumann, Brahms, Kirchner, Liszt, Courvoisier, Matthiesen, Berg, Wolf, Gramola 98999
- 2016: Seid menschlich, froh und gut: Lieder after poems by Johann Heinrich Voß, piano: Sascha El Mouissi: C. Ph. E. Bach, Schulz, Reichardt, Zelter, Kunzen, Nägeli, Sterkel, Zumsteeg, Schubert, Mendelssohn, Hensel, Weber, Brahms, Gramola 99118
- 2017: Wie tut mir so wohl der selige Frieden!: Lieder nach Lyrik von Karl Gottfried von Leitner: and rezitierte Gedichte, piano: Sascha El Mouissi: F. Schubert, A. Hüttenbrenner, S. Thalberg, F. Lachner, A. Stadler, R. Fuchs, Gramola 99068
- 2017: Ich blick in mein Herz und ich blick’ in die Welt: Lieder after poems by Emanuel Geibel, piano: Sascha El Mouissi: Mendelssohn Bartholdy, Robert Schumann, Lachner, Jensen, Alexander Fesca, Randhartinger, Clara Schumann, Grünfeld, Wolf, Grieg, Brahms, Herrmann, Bruckner, Brüll, Lyra, Franz, Reger, Plüddemann, Gramola 99136
