= Josef Eduard Teltscher =

Austrian painter and lithographer

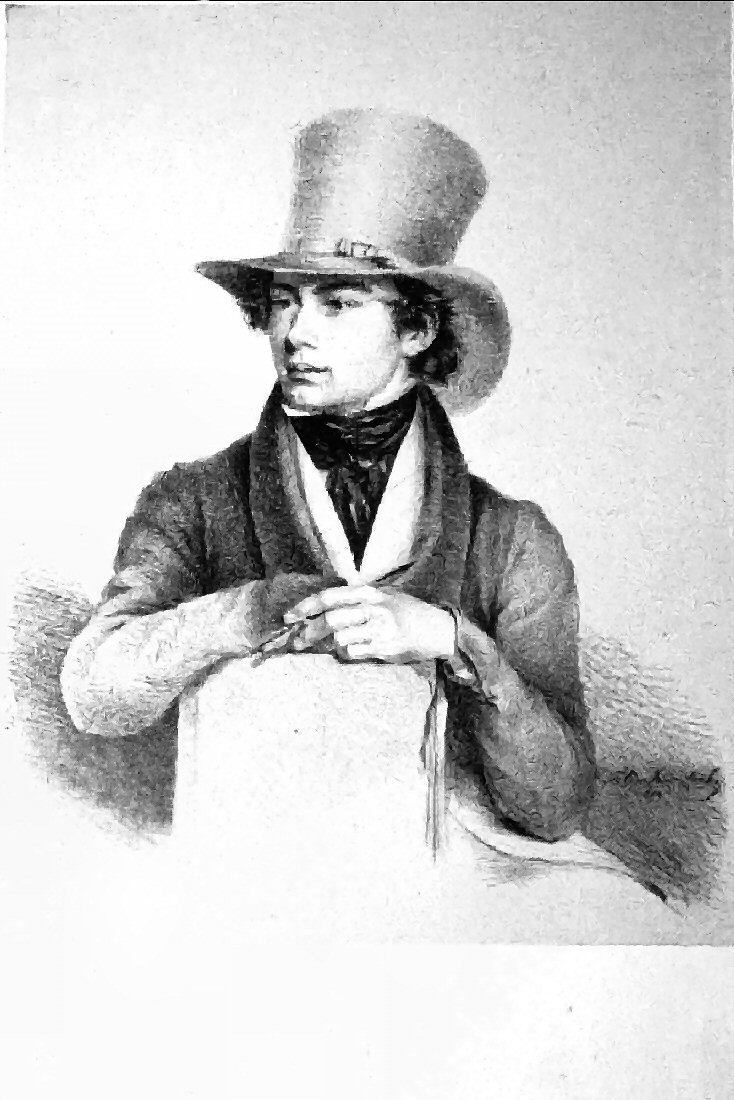
- Josef Eduard Teltscher, a self-portrait. Lithography 1825.
- Born: Josef Eduard Teltscher; 15 January 1801; Prague, Bohemia
- Died: 7 July 1837 (aged 36); Piraeus, Greece
- Known for: Painting
- Notable work: Ludwig van Beethoven (1770-1827) on his deathbed, 28 March 1827
- Movement: Romanticism

Josef Eduard Teltscher (15 January 1801 – 7 July 1837) was an Austrian painter and lithographer. He was one of the best Viennese portrait lithographers and watercolourists of the first half of the nineteenth century in Central Europe, and as a miniaturist, according to his contemporaries, he was no less than Moritz Daffinger himself.

== Life ==
Teltscher was born in Prague, Bohemia on 15 January 1801. He began his apprendiship in lithography in Brno and then from 1823 he was a student at the Vienna Academy. He was one of the first and most outstanding portrait lithographers in Vienna of the Biedermeier period and already had dealt with this new technology even before Josef Kriehuber. From 1829 to 1832, he had a very fruitful and successful period in Graz.

He was close to Franz Schubert and his circle of friends and created the most authentic portraits of the master. Also, he was with Ludwig van Beethoven on his deathbed. These blades were, as described in Die Welt von Gestern, owned by Stefan Zweig, but that are property of the British Library today. On 7 July 1837, Teltscher drowned on a study trip in the port of Piraeus in Greece.

== Gallery ==
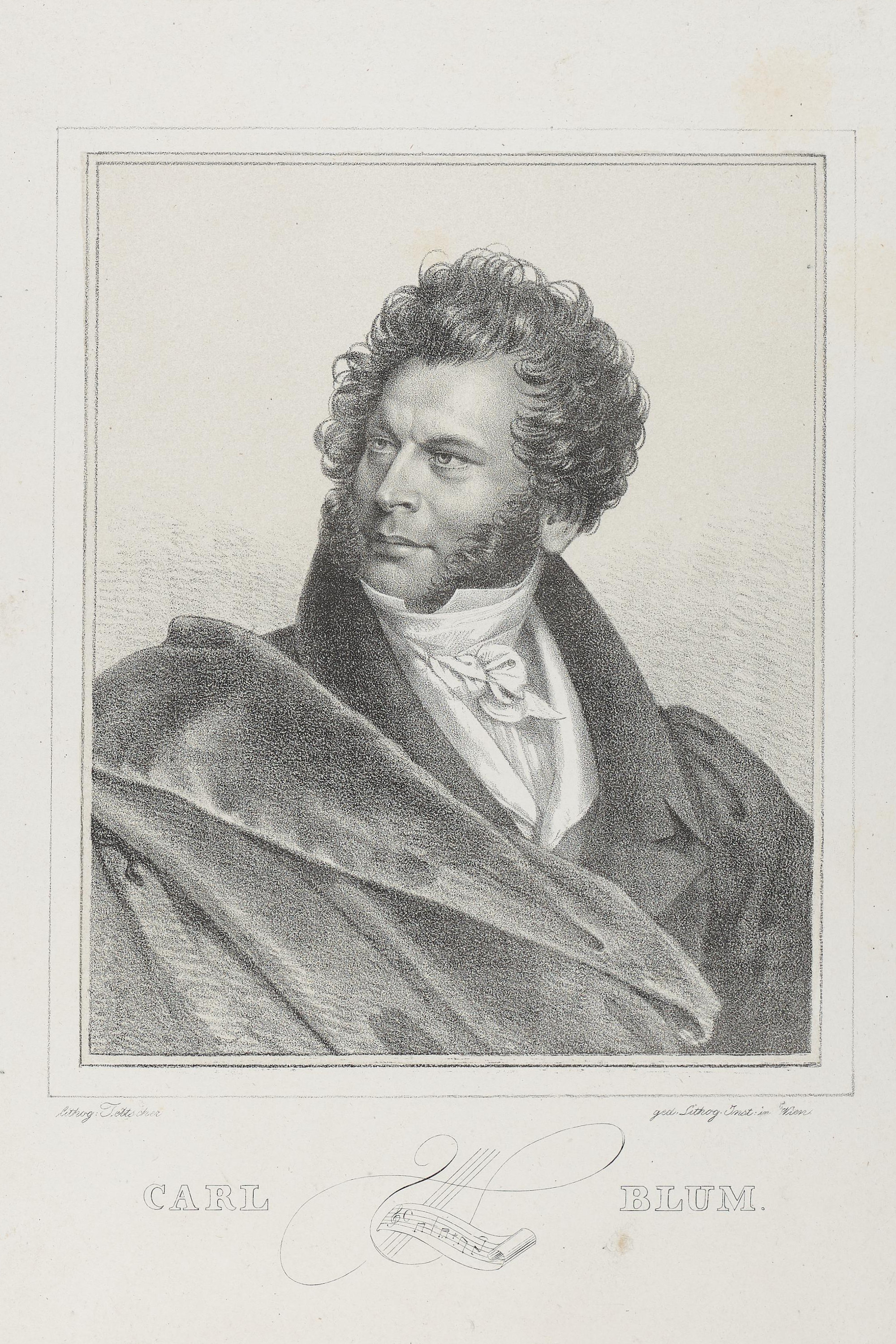
Carl Blum

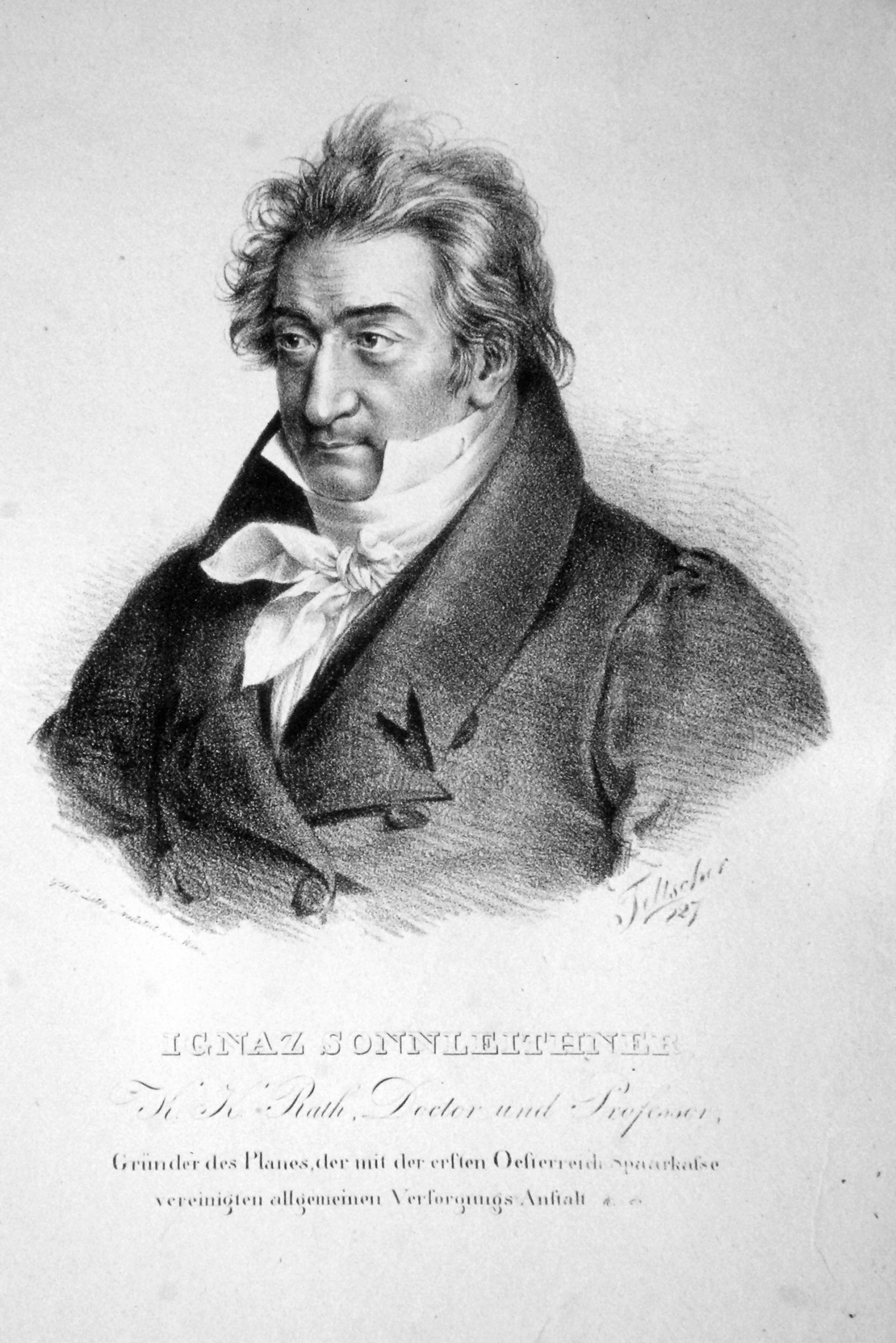
Ignaz von Sonnleithner

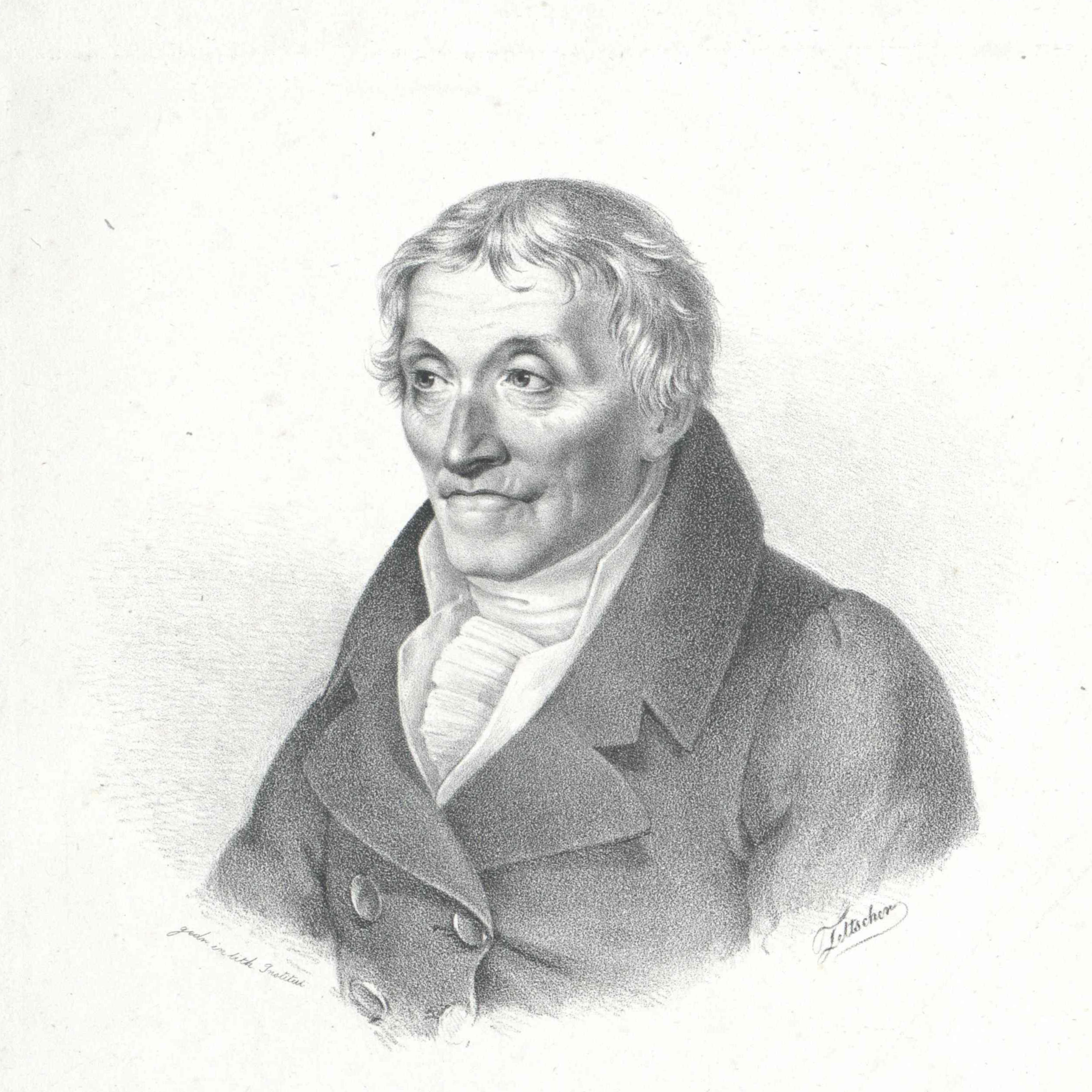
Emanuel Aloys Förster

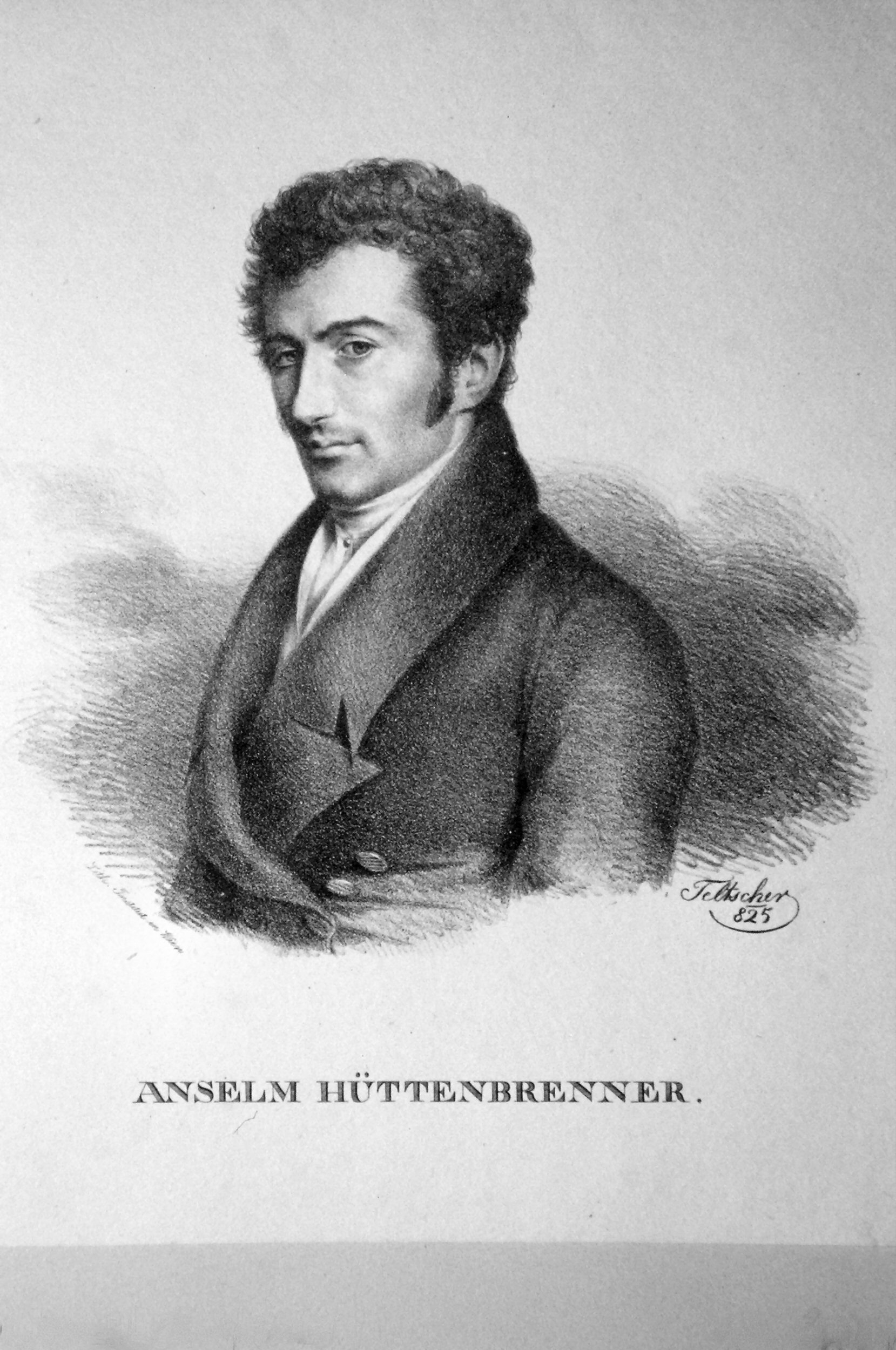
Anselm Hüttenbrenner

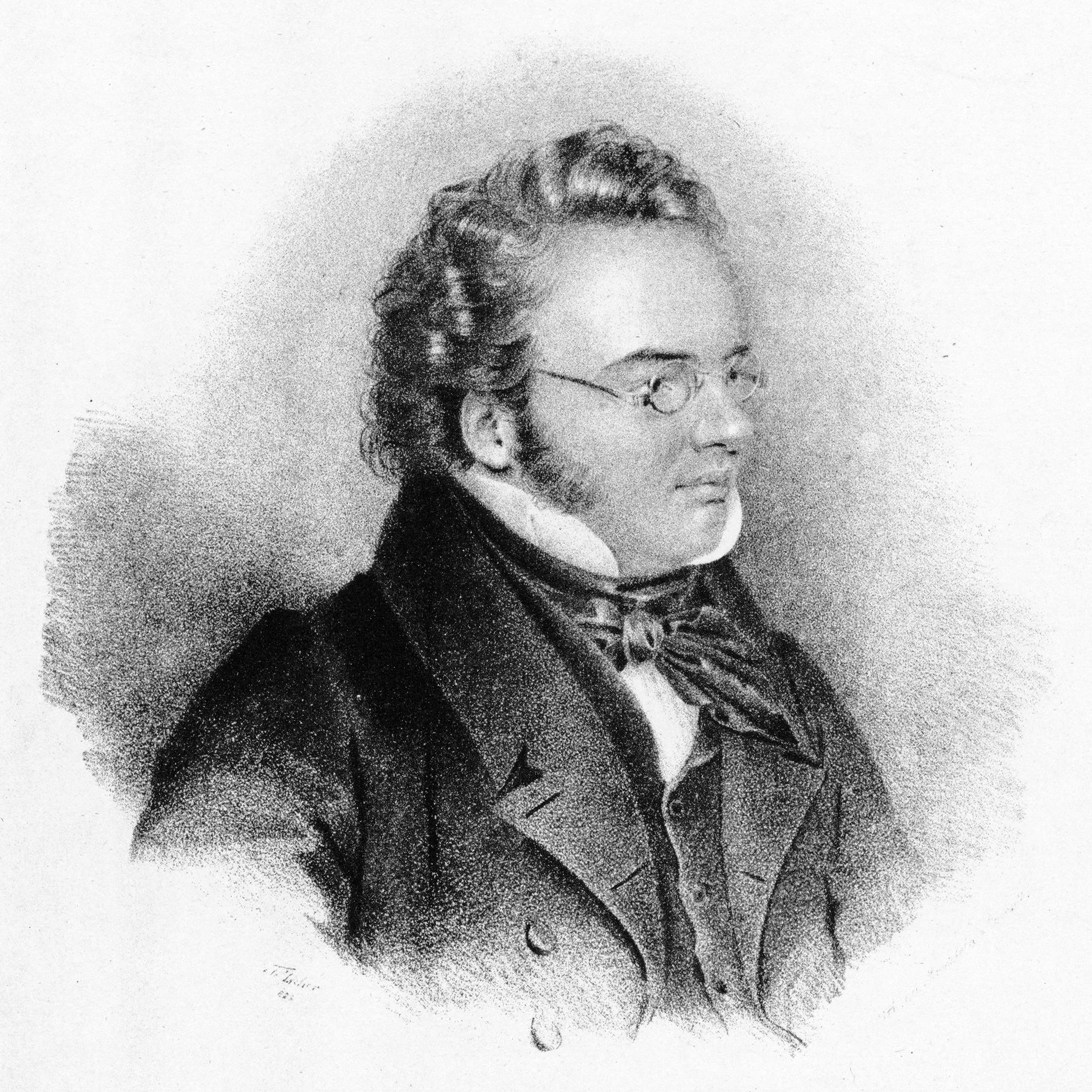
Franz Schubert

== See also ==
- Etching
- Gouache
