= Die Zwillingsbrüder =

1819 Singspiel by Franz Schubert

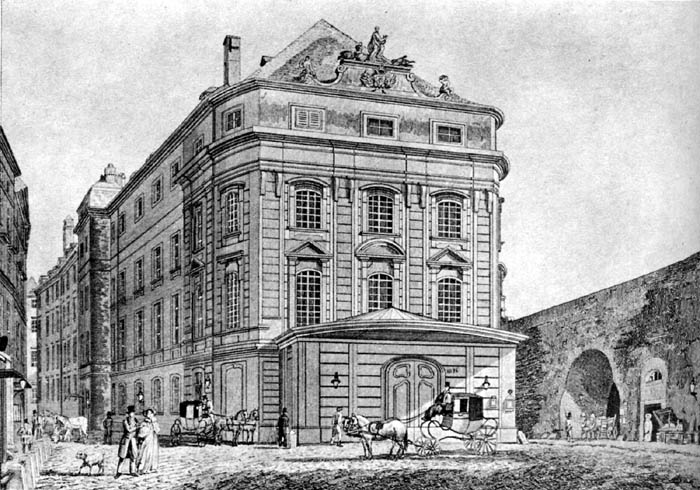
The Kärntnertortheater, where Die Zwillingsbrüder was premièred in 1820. Lithograph, ca. 1830.

Die Zwillingsbrüder (The Twin Brothers, D. 647) is a one-act Singspiel (sometimes also described as a Posse mit Gesang) composed by Franz Schubert in 1819 on a libretto by Georg Ernst von Hofmann. Die Zwillingsbrüder was first performed at the Kärntnertortheater on June 14, 1820.

Hofmann based the libretto on the 1818 French vaudeville Les deux Valentin (The Two Valentines) by Marc-Antoine Madeleine Désaugiers and Michel-Joseph Gentil de Chavagnac (1770–1846).

Die Zwillingsbrüder, like Schubert's other operatic works, met with limited success both at the work's inception and over time. Critics attribute this to the weakness of the libretto as well as to a mismatch between the lightness of the subject matter and the refined nature of Schubert's music. In this work, Schubert's music often approaches the style of Mozart, evoking for instance Die Zauberflöte.

== Roles ==
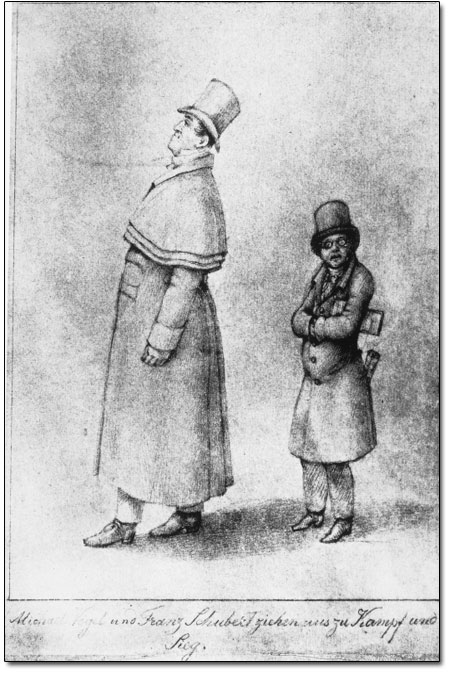
Caricature of baritone Johann Michael Vogl (left), who sang the role of the twin brothers at the 1820 première of Die Zwillingsbrüder, with composer Franz Schubert (right). Drawing by Franz von Schober.

Role	Voice type	Première cast
Der Schultze (mayor)	bass	Josef Gottdank (1779–1849)
Lieschen, his daughter	soprano	Elizabeth (Betty) Vio (Spitzeder) (c. 1806–1872)
Anton	tenor	Viktor Rosenfeld (1790–?)
Notary	bass	Sebastian Mayer (1773–1835)
Franz / Friedrich Spiess	bass	Johann Michael Vogl (1768–1840)
Villagers	Mixed chorus	Mixed chorus

== Synopsis ==
The scene takes place in a village on the Rhine, on the 18th birthday of the young heroine, Lieschen. Lieschen is eagerly awaiting her marriage to her young fiancé, Anton. The opera opens with a chorus in the couple's honor.

Unfortunately, upon Lieschen's birth, her father, Der Schulze, had agreed with a friend, Franz Spiess, that, in exchange for a sum of money, Franz would be allowed to marry Lieschen when she came of age. Immediately following the deal, Spiess had left for the war. Franz, now an old veteran whom the villagers had presumed dead, suddenly returns, on the last day on which he can claim his bride, and Lieschen's father must keep his word.

Coincidentally, Friedrich Spiess, Franz's twin brother, also a veteran, happens to return to the village on that same day. The Spiess brothers are both under the impression that their twin was killed in the war. Since they are identical twins and they are never in the same place at the same time, the villagers mistake them for each other. The twins' stories and behaviors do not match (while one brother strives to arrange his marriage to the heroine, the other gladly revokes his right to it), leading Der Schulze to believe that the old soldier has sustained a mentally impairing sword wound and that he is unfit to marry his daughter. After this confusion is used to comic effect in a variety of ways, the twins finally meet, and Lieschen is allowed to marry Anton.

== Discography ==
- Die Zwillingsbrüder – Wolfgang Sawallisch, conductor, Dietrich Fischer-Dieskau, Helen Donath, Nicolai Gedda, etc. Choir and Orchestra Bayerische Staatsoper München (1978)
- Die Zwillingsbrüder – Peter Maag, conductor; Solisti Cantori, Philharmonia Mediterranea, Bongiovanni. (1997)
- Der Vierjährige Posten and Die Zwillingsbrüder – Christoph Spering, Capriccio Christoph Spering, conductor; Chorus Musicus Köln, Das Neue Orchester. Phoenix Edition. (2008)
