= Charles Spencer (pianist) =

English classical pianist and music educator

Charles Spencer (born 1955) is an English classical pianist and music educator.

== Life ==
Born in Thorne, South Yorkshire, Spencer studied with Max Pirani at the Royal Academy of Music in London and at the University of Music and Performing Arts Vienna. He was awarded the Promotion Prize for Artistic Achievements of the Austrian Federal Government. He is mainly known as Lied accompanist. He was the permanent pianist of Christa Ludwig, Bernarda Fink, Gundula Janowitz, Vesselina Kasarova, Marjana Lipovšek, Jessye Norman, Deborah Polaski, Thomas Quasthoff, Ildikó Raimondi, Peter Schreier, John Shirley-Quirk and Deon van der Walt. He also accompanied Cheryl Studer, Elīna Garanča, Petra Lang, Andreas Schmidt, Peter Seiffert, Petra-Maria Schnitzer, Janina Baechle and Iris Vermillion. He has recorded numerous disks - including Schubert Lieder with Gundula Janowitz and Thomas Quasthoff, Brahms-Lieder with Marjana Lipovšek, Deborah Polaski, Deon van der Walt, Doris Soffel and Michael Volle as well as recitals with Maria Venuti and Deon van der Walt. Supported by the Landesregierung von Schleswig-Holstein, he founded a song festival with the singer Ulf Bästlein in Husum. His Rossini-CD with Cecilia Bartoli and his accompaniment to Christa Ludwig's "Farewell to Salzburg" received international recognition. Since 1999, Spencer has also been working as a professor for Lied interpretation at the University of Music and Performing Arts Vienna.

== Recordings ==
- Brahms, lieder - Marjana Lipovšek (1993, Sony)
- Chopin and Pauline Viardot, Mélodies - Urszula Kryger, mezzo-soprano (29–31 March / 15 June 1999, Hyperion CDH55270)
- Liszt
  - melodies, vol. 1 - Janina Baechle, mezzo-soprano (6–12 January 2009, SACD Marsyas MAR 1807-2)
  - melodies, vol. 2 - Adrian Eröd, baritone (5–11 January 2009, Marsyas MAR 1806-2)
- Rossini Recital - Cecilia Bartoli (1991, Decca)
- Schubert
  - 15 lieder - Gundula Janowitz (October 1989, Nuova Era 232909)
  - Goethe Lieder - Thomas Quasthoff, bass-baritone (1995, RCA)
  - Winterreise - Thomas Quasthoff, baryton-basse (1998, RCA)
- Schumann, Liszt, Brahms, Dichterliebe : Lieder nach Gedichte von Heinrich Heine - Deon Van der Walt, tenor (26–29 July 1994, Nightingale Classics)
- Schumann:
  - lieder and duets - Petra Maria Schnitzer (soprano), Peter Seiffert (tenor) (20–21 November 2001, Orfeo)
  - lieder, op. 35 et 90 - Paul Armin Edelmann, baritone (2014, Capriccio C5172)
- Melodies set on poems by Theodor Storm - Ulf Bästlein, barytone (2004, MDG)
- Beethoven, Britten, Zemlinsky Eisler, Weill… melodies - Thomas Michael Allen, tenor (2014, Capriccio)
