= List of compositions by Franz Schubert by genre =

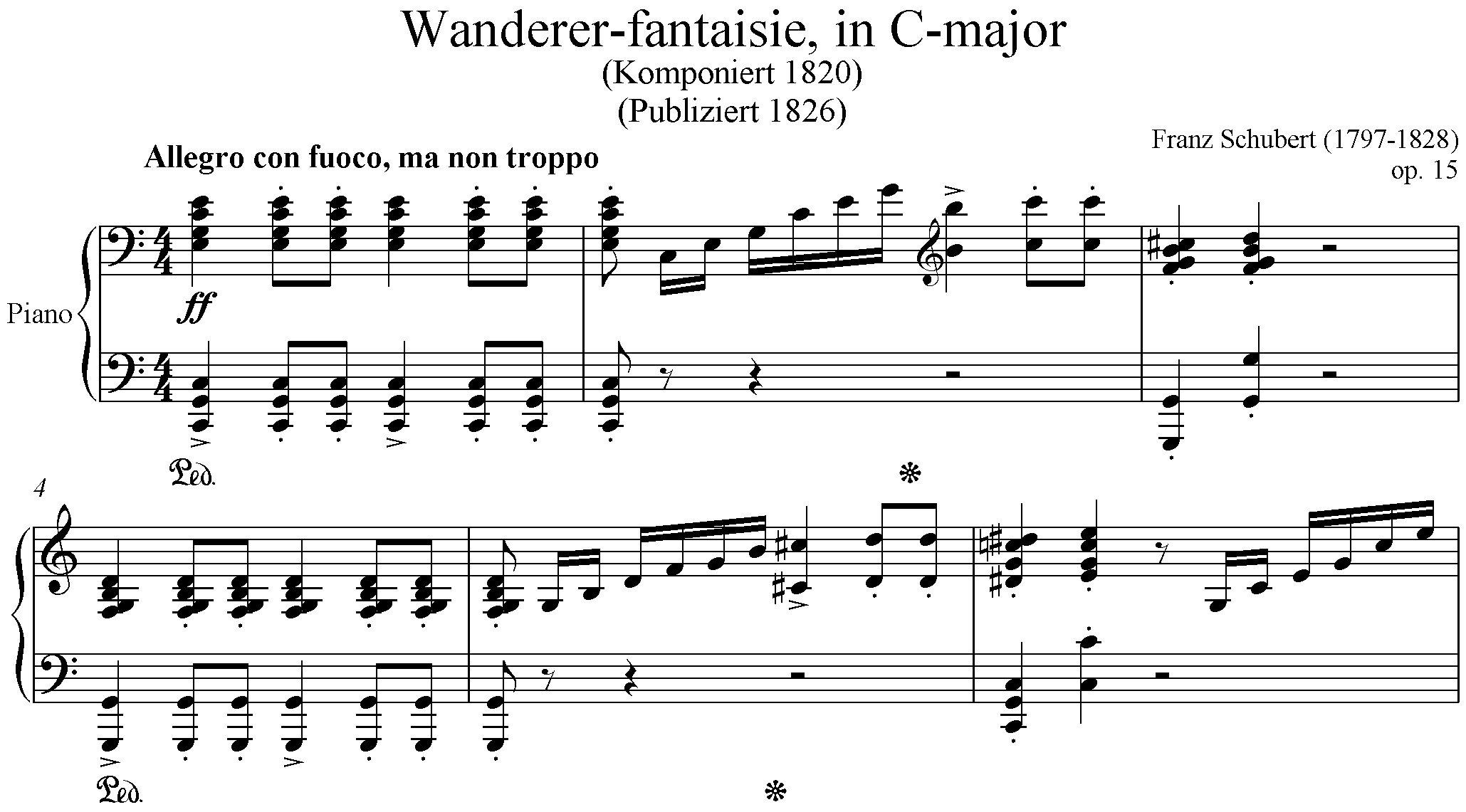
Opening of the Wanderer Fantasy, Op. 15 (D 760), one of Schubert's miscellaneous works for solo piano

Franz Schubert (31 January 1797 – 19 November 1828) was an extremely prolific Austrian composer. He composed some 1500 works (or, when collections, cycles and variants are grouped, some thousand compositions). The largest group are the lieder for piano and solo voice (over six hundred), and nearly as many piano pieces. Schubert also composed some 150 part songs, some 40 liturgical compositions (including several masses) and around 20 stage works like operas and incidental music. His orchestral output includes thirteen symphonies (seven completed) and several overtures. Schubert's chamber music includes over 20 string quartets, and several quintets, trios and duos.

This article constitutes a complete list of Schubert's known works organized by their genre. The complete output is divided in eight series, and in principle follows the order established by the Neue Schubert-Ausgabe printed edition. The works found in each series are ordered ascendingly according to Deutsch numbers, the information of which attempts to reflect the most current information regarding Schubert's catalogue.

The list below includes the following information:

- D – the catalogue number assigned by Otto Erich Deutsch or NSA authorities
- Genre – the musical genre to which the piece belongs. This has been omitted when the genre is self-explanatory or unnecessary, i.e. piano dances
- Title – the title of the work
- Incipit – the first line(s) of text, as pertaining to vocal works
- Scoring – the instrumentation and/or vocal forces required for the work
- Informal Title – any additional names by which the work is known, when applicable
- Former Deutsch Number – information on Deutsch numbers that have been reassigned, when applicable
- Date – the known or assumed date of composition, when available; or date of publication
- Opus Number – the opus number of the original publication of the work, when applicable
- Setting – the order of setting as it pertains to vocal works that have numerous settings of the same text
- Version – the number of version as it pertains to works or vocal settings that have more than one existing version
- Notes – any additional information concerning the work: alternate titles, completeness, relation to other works, authorship, etc.

== Series I: Church music ==
=== Masses, requiems and Stabat mater ===
- D 24E, Mass in F major (?) for mixed choir, orchestra and organ (1812?; fragments of two movements, "Gloria" and "Credo" are extant)
- D 105, Mass No. 1 in F major for two sopranos, alto, two tenors, bass, mixed choir, orchestra and organ (1814, 2 settings of the "Dona Nobis Pacem"; 2nd setting was formerly D 185)
- D 167, Mass No. 2 in G major for soprano, tenor, bass, mixed choir, string orchestra and organ (1815)
- D 324, Mass No. 3 in B♭ major for soprano, alto, tenor, bass, mixed choir, orchestra and organ (1815, first published as Op. posth. 141)
- D 383, Oratorio "Stabat Mater" ['Jesus Christus schwebt am Kreuze'] in F minor for soprano, tenor, bass, mixed choir and orchestra (1816, also appears as "Deutsche Stabat Mater"; sketches for Nos. 5 and 6, "Wer wird sich nicht innig freuen" were formerly D 992)
- D 452, Mass No. 4 in C major for soprano, alto, tenor, bass, mixed choir, orchestra and organ (1816, first published as Op. 48; 2nd setting of the "Benedictus" was formerly D 961)
- D 453, Requiem in C minor for mixed choir and orchestra (1816, fragment of the first movement is extant)
- D 621, German Requiem in G minor for soprano, alto, tenor, bass, mixed choir and organ, Deutsche Trauermesse (1818, 4 versions; only the 1st version is complete; NSA appends a synopsis of the 2nd, 3rd and 4th versions)
- D 678, Mass No. 5 in A♭ major for soprano, alto, tenor, bass, mixed choir, orchestra and organ (1819 and 1822; 2 versions)
- D 872, Mass "Deutsche Messe" for mixed choir and organ, Gesänge zur Feier des heiligen Opfers der Messe. Nebst einem Anhange, enthaltend: Das Gebet des Herr (1827, 2 versions; 2nd version adds two oboes, two clarinets, two bassoons, two horns, two trumpets, three trombones, timpani and double bass)
- D 950, Mass No. 6 in E♭ major for soprano, alto, tenor, bass, mixed choir and orchestra (1828)
- D deest, Mass in C major (?) for mixed choir, two violins and organ (1811?, sketch?; lost or never written)

=== Mass movements ===
- D 31, Kyrie ['Kyrie eleison'] to a Mass in D minor for soprano, tenor, mixed choir, orchestra and organ (1812)
- D 45, Kyrie ['Kyrie eleison'] in B♭ major for mixed choir (1813)
- D 49, Kyrie ['Kyrie eleison'] to a Mass in D minor for soprano, alto, tenor, bass, mixed choir and orchestra (1813)
- D 56, Canon "Sanctus" ['Sanctus'] in B♭ major for three voices (1813, 2 versions)
- D 66, Kyrie ['Kyrie eleison'] in F major for mixed choir, orchestra and organ (1813)
- D 755, Kyrie ['Kyrie eleison'] to a Mass in A minor for soprano, alto, tenor, bass, mixed choir, string orchestra and organ (1822, sketch)

=== Smaller sacred works ===
- D 27, Antiphon "Salve Regina" ['Salve Regina'] in F major for soprano, orchestra and organ (1812)
- D 71A, Canon "Alleluja" ['Alleluja'] in F major for three voices (1813)
- D 106, Antiphon "Salve Regina" ['Salve Regina'] in B♭ major for tenor, orchestra and organ (1814)
- D 136, Offertory "Totus in Corde" ['Totus in corde langueo'] in C major for soprano (or tenor), clarinet (or violin) concertante, orchestra and organ, Erstes Offertorium (1815?, first published as Op. 46)
- D 175, Sequence "Stabat mater" ['Stabat mater'] in G minor for mixed choir, orchestra and organ (1815)
- D 181, Offertory "Tres sunt" ['Tres sunt, qui testimonium dant in coelo'] in A minor for mixed choir, orchestra and organ (1815)
- D 184, Gradual "Benedictus es, Domine" ['Benedictus es, Domine'] in C major for mixed choir, orchestra and organ (1815, first published as Op. posth. 150)
- D 223, Offertory "Salve Regina" ['Salve Regina'] in F major for soprano, orchestra and organ, Zweites Offertorium (1815 and 1823, 2 versions; 2nd version first published as Op. 47)
- D 379, Antiphon "Deutsches Salve Regina" ['Sei, Mutter der Barmherzigkeit'] in F major for mixed choir and organ (1816)
- D 386, Antiphon "Salve Regina" ['Salve Regina'] in B♭ major for mixed choir (1816)
- D 460, Hymn "Tantum ergo" ['Tantum ergo'] in C major for soprano, mixed choir, orchestra and organ (1816)
- D 461, Hymn "Tantum ergo" ['Tantum ergo'] in C major for soprano, alto, tenor, bass, mixed choir, orchestra and organ (1816)
- D 486, Hymn "Magnificat" ['Magnificat anima mea Dominum'] in C major for soprano, alto, tenor, bass, mixed choir, orchestra and organ (1815)
- D 488, Offertory "Auguste jam coelestium" ['Auguste jam coelestium'] in G major for soprano, tenor and orchestra (1816)
- D 607, Song "Evangelium Johannis 6, Vers 55–58" ['In der Zeit sprach der Herr Jesus'] for voice and figured bass (1818, fragment; figured bass usually realized for piano)
- D 676, Offertory "Salve Regina" ['Salve Regina'] in A major for soprano and orchestra, Drittes Offertorium (1819, first published as Op. posth. 153)
- D 696, Six Antiphons "Sechs Antiphonen zum Palmsonntag" for mixed choir (1820, first published as Op. posth. 113)

1. "Hosanna filio David"
2. "In monte Oliveti"
3. "Sanctus"
4. "Pueri Hebraeorum"
5. "Cum angelis et pueris"
6. "Ingrediente Domino"

- D 706, Hymn "Der 23. Psalm" ['Gott ist mein Hirt, mir wird nichts mangeln'] for two sopranos, two altos and piano (1820, first published as Op. posth. 132)
- D 730, Hymn "Tantum ergo" ['Tantum ergo'] in B♭ major for soprano, alto, tenor, bass, mixed choir and orchestra (1821)
- D 739, Hymn "Tantum ergo" ['Tantum ergo'] in C major for mixed choir, orchestra and organ (1814, first published as Op. 45)
- D 750, Hymn "Tantum ergo" ['Tantum ergo'] in D major for mixed choir, orchestra and organ (1822)
- D 811, Antiphon "Salve Regina" ['Salve Regina'] in C major for two tenors and two basses (1824, first published as Op. posth. 149)
- D 948, Hymn "Hymnus an den heiligen Geist" ['Komm, heil'ger Geist, erhöre unser Flehen'] for two tenors, two basses and men's choir (1828, 2 versions; 1st version was formerly D 941; 2nd version [formerly D964] for two tenors, two basses, men's choir, two oboes, two clarinets, two bassoons, two trumpets, two horns and three trombones; 2nd version first published as Op. posth. 154)
- D 953, Hymn "Der 92. Psalm" ['tôw l'hôdôs ladônoj'] for baritone, soprano, alto, tenor, bass and mixed choir (1828)
- D 962, Hymn "Tantum ergo" ['Tantum ergo'] in E♭ major for soprano, alto, tenor, bass, mixed choir and orchestra (1828)
- D 963, Offertory "Intende voci" ['Intende voci'] in B♭ major for tenor, mixed choir and orchestra (1828)
- D deest, Tantum ergo ['Tantum ergo'] in C major for mixed choir and orchestra (1821)
- D deest, Tantum ergo ['Tantum ergo'] in C major for mixed choir and orchestra (1821)

== Series II: Stage works ==
- D 11, Singspiel Der Spiegelritter for five sopranos, three tenors, four basses, mixed choir and orchestra (1811?, in three acts?; unfinished – Overture, five complete numbers and three fragments from Act I are extant)
- D 84, Singspiel Des Teufels Lustschloß for three sopranos, two tenors, three basses, one spoken role, mixed choir and orchestra (1814, in three acts: Overture and twenty-three numbers; 2 versions; NSA also appends three discarded numbers: No. 13 from the 1st version and Nos. 7 and 23 from the 2nd version, in addition to a fragment of an orchestral postlude)
- D 137, Singspiel Adrast for soprano, tenor, bass, men's choir and orchestra (1817, in two or three acts?; unfinished – thirteen numbers are extant: eight are complete, and five are sketches)
- D 190, Singspiel Der vierjährige Posten for soprano, three tenors, bass, one spoken role, mixed choir and orchestra (1815, in one act: Overture and eight numbers)
- D 220, Singspiel Fernando for two sopranos, tenor, two basses, one spoken role and orchestra (1815, in one act: seven numbers)
- D 239, Singspiel Claudine von Villa Bella for two sopranos, two tenors, two basses, mixed choir and orchestra (1815, in three acts; incomplete – Act I: Overture and eight numbers, is extant, as well as one number from Act II and one number from Act III; remaining numbers were written, but are now lost)
- D 326, Singspiel Die Freunde von Salamanka for three sopranos, three tenors, six basses, mixed choir and orchestra (1815, in two acts: Overture and eighteen numbers)
- D 435, Opera Die Bürgschaft for four sopranos, three tenors, three basses, two baritones, mixed choir and orchestra (1816, in three acts; unfinished – Act I: nine numbers, five numbers from Act II, and one number and one fragment from Act III are extant)
- D 644, Music for Zauberspiel Die Zauberharfe for tenor, six spoken roles, mixed choir and orchestra (1820, in three acts: Overtures to the first and third acts, and thirteen numbers; Overture to the first act known as the "Rosamunde" Overture, also used in D 797)
- D 647, Singspiel Die Zwillingsbrüder for soprano, tenor, three basses, mixed choir and orchestra (1819, in one act: Overture and ten numbers)
- D 689, Oratorio Lazarus, oder: Die Feier der Auferstehung for three sopranos, two tenors, bass, mixed choir and orchestra (1820, in three acts; unfinished – Act I: twenty-one numbers, and eight numbers from Act II are extant)
- D 701, Opera Sakuntala for fourteen sopranos, three altos, five tenors, nine basses, mixed choir and orchestra (1820, also appears as "Sakontala" or "Sakuntala"; in three acts; unfinished – sketches of eleven numbers from Acts I and II are extant)
- D 723, Duet and Aria for Hérold's Das Zauberglöckchen ['Nein, nein, nein, nein, das ist zu viel'; 'Der Tag entflieht, der Abend glüht'] for two tenors, bass and orchestra (1821)
- D 732, Opera Alfonso und Estrella for two sopranos, two tenors, bass, two baritones, mixed choir and orchestra (1821–1822, in three acts: Overture and thirty-four numbers)
- D 787, Singspiel Die Verschworenen, a.k.a. Der häusliche Krieg, for four or five sopranos, two altos, two or three tenors, two basses, mixed choir and orchestra (1823, in one act: eleven numbers)
- D 791, Opera Rüdiger for two tenors, men's choir and orchestra (1823, sketches of two numbers are extant)
- D 796, Opera Fierrabras for three sopranos, three tenors, three basses, baritone, one spoken role, mixed choir and orchestra (1823, also appears as "Fierrabras"; in three acts: Overture and twenty-three numbers; first published as Op. 76)
- D 797, Music for Schauspiel Rosamunde, Fürstin von Zypern for alto, mixed choir and orchestra (1823, Overture and nine numbers; first published as Op. 26)
- D 918, Opera Der Graf von Gleichen for four sopranos, two tenors, six basses, mixed choir and orchestra (1827, in two acts; unfinished – sketches of eleven numbers for Act I and nine numbers for Act II are extant)
- D 981, Singspiel Der Minnesänger (date unknown, fragment; lost)
- D 982, Opera "?" for two sopranos, tenor, bass and orchestra (1819–1821?, also appears as Sophie; title and text author unknown; sketches of three numbers are extant)

== Series III: Part songs ==
=== Part songs with orchestral accompaniment ===
- D 110, Cantata "Wer ist groß?" ['Wer ist wohl groß?'] for bass, men's choir and orchestra (1814)
- D 294, Cantata "Namensfeier" ['Erhabner! Verehrter Freund der Jugend!'] for soprano, tenor, bass, choir and orchestra, Namensfeier fur Franz Michael Vierthaler or Gratulations-Kantate (1815)
- D 451, Cantata "Prometheus" ['Hervor aus Buschen und Baumen'] for soprano, bass, choir and orchestra (1816, lost)
- Op. posth. 128 – D 472, Cantata "Kantate zu Ehren von Josef Spendou" for two sopranos, tenor, bass, mixed choir and orchestra (1816, see also D 470?)

1. Da liegt er, starr
2. Gottes Bild ist Fürst und Staat
3. Ein Punkt nur ist der Mensch
4. Die Sonne sticht

- D 714, Octet "Gesang der Geister über den Wassern" ['Des Menschen Seele gleicht dem Wasser'] for four tenors, four basses, two violas, two violoncellos and double bass (1820–1821, 4th setting; 1st version [formerly D 704], sketch)
- Op. posth. 167 – D 714, Octet "Gesang der Geister über den Wassern" ['Des Menschen Seele gleicht dem Wasser'] for four tenors, four basses, two violas, two violoncellos and double bass (1820–1821, 4th setting; 2nd version)
- Op. posth. 157 – D 748, Cantata "Am Geburtstage des Kaisers" ['Steig empor, umblüht von Segen'] for soprano, alto, tenor, bass, mixed choir and orchestra (1822)
- Op. posth. 139 – D 913, Quartet "Nachtgesang im Walde" ['Sei uns stets gegrüßt, o Nacht!'] for two tenors, two basses and four horns (1827)
- D 954, Cantata "Glaube, Hoffnung und Liebe" ['Gott, laß die Glocke glücklich steigen']; version for two tenors, two basses, mixed choir, two oboes, two clarinets, two bassoons, two horns and two trombones (1828)

=== Song cycles containing part songs ===
- Op. 52, Sieben Gesänge aus Walter Scotts "Fräulein am See" (1825)

No. 3 – D 835, Quartet "Bootgesang" ['Triumph, er naht'] for two tenors, two basses and piano (1825)
No. 4 – D 836, Chorus "Coronach (Totengesang der Frauen und Mädchen)" ['Er ist uns geschieden'] for women's choir and piano, Totengesang der Frauen und Mädchen (1825)

- Op. 62 – D 877, Song cycle Gesänge aus "Wilhelm Meister" (1826)

=== Part songs for mixed ensemble ===
==== Part songs for mixed ensemble and piano ====
- D 47, Cantata "Dithyrambe" ['Nimmer, das glaubt mir, erscheinen die Götter'] for tenor, bass, mixed choir and piano (1813, 1st setting; fragment)
- D 126, Duet "Szene aus Faust" ['Wie anders, Gretchen, war dir's'] for two voices and piano (1814, 1st and 2nd versions; also possible as a Cantata for voice, choir and piano; or as a Cantata for two voices, choir and piano)
- D 168, Chorus "Nun laßt uns den Leib begraben" ['Begrabt den Leib in seiner Gruft'] for mixed choir and piano, Begräbnislied (1815)
- D 168A, Chorus "Jesus Christus unser Heiland, der den Tod überwand" ['Überwunden hat der Herr den Tod!'] for mixed choir and piano, Osterlied [formerly D 987] (1815)
- Op. posth. 112 No. 3 – D 232, Quartet "Hymne an den Unendlichen" ['Zwischen Himmel und Erd' '] for soprano, alto, tenor, bass and piano (1815)
- D 236, Trio "Das Abendrot" ['Der Abend blüht, der Westen glüht!'] for two sopranos, bass and piano (1815)
- D 249, Cantata "Die Schlacht" ['Schwer und dumpfig'] for unspecified voices/instruments (1815, 1st setting; sketch)
- D 352, Duet "Licht und Liebe" ['Liebe ist ein süßes Licht'] for soprano, tenor and piano, Nachtgesang (1816?)
- D 387, Cantata "Die Schlacht" ['Schwer und dumpfig'] for unspecified soloists, choir and piano (1816, 2nd setting; sketch)
- D 439, Quartet "An die Sonne" ['O Sonne, Königin der Welt'] for soprano, alto, tenor, bass and piano (1816)
- Op. 6 No. 2 – D 542, Duet "Antigone und Oedip" ['Ihr hohen Himmlischen'] for two voices and piano (1817)
- D 609, Quartet "Die Geselligkeit" ['Wer Lebenslust fühlet'] for soprano, alto, tenor, bass and piano, Lebenslust (1818, 2nd part of the 1st verse, "im traulichen Kreise" was formerly D 665)
- D 642, Quartet "Viel tausend Sterne prangen" ['Viel tausend Sterne prangen'] for soprano, alto, tenor, bass and piano (1812?)
- Op. posth. 158 – D 666, Cantata "Kantate zum Geburtstag des Sängers Johann Michael Vogl" for soprano, tenor, bass and piano, Der Frühlingsmorgen (1819)

1. Sänger, der von Herzen singet
2. Diese Berge sah'n dich blühen
3. Da saht ihr Orestes scheiden
4. Gott bewahr' dein teures Leben

- D 725, Duet "Linde Weste wehen" for mezzo-soprano, tenor and piano (1821, fragment)
- Op. posth. 146 – D 763, Quartet "Schicksalslenker, blicke nieder" for soprano, alto, tenor, bass and piano, Des Tages Weihe (1822)
- Op. posth. 139 – D 815, Quartet "Gebet" ['Du Urquell aller Güte'] for soprano, alto, tenor, bass and piano (1824)
- D 826, Quartet "Der Tanz" ['Es redet und träumet die Jugend so viel'] for soprano, alto, tenor, bass and piano (1828)
- D 875A, Chorus "Die Allmacht" ['Groß ist Jehova der Herr!'] for mixed choir and piano (1826, 2nd setting; sketch)
- D 920, Cantata "Ständchen" ['Zögernd leise, in des Dunkels nächt'ger Hülle'] for alto, men's choir and piano, Notturno (1827, 1st version)
- Op. posth. 104 – D 930, Trio "Der Hochzeitsbraten" ['Ach liebes Herz, ach Theobald, laß dir nur diesmal raten'] for soprano, tenor, bass and piano (1827)
- D 936, Cantata "Kantate für Irene Kiesewetter" ['Al par del ruscelletto chiaro'] for two tenors, two basses, mixed choir and piano duet (1827, also appears as "Kantate zur Feier der Genesung der Irene Kiesewetter")
- Op. posth. 136 – D 942, Cantata "Mirjams Siegesgesang" ['Rührt die Zimbel, schlagt die Saiten'] for soprano, mixed choir and piano (1828)

1. Rührt die Zimbel, schlagt die Saiten
2. Aus Ägypten vor dem Volke
3. Doch der Horizont erdunkelt
4. S'ist der Herr in seinem Grimme
5. Tauchst du auf, Pharao?
6. Drum mit Zimbeln und mit Saiten

- D 954, Cantata "Glaube, Hoffnung und Liebe" ['Gott, laß die Glocke glücklich steigen']; version for two tenors, two basses, mixed choir and piano (1828)
- Op. posth. 112 No. 1 – D 985, Quartet "Gott im Ungewitter" ['Du Schrecklicher, wer kann vor dir und deinem Donner stehn?'] for soprano, alto, tenor, bass and piano (1815?)
- Op. posth. 112 No. 2 – D 986, Quartet "Gott der Weltschöpfer" ['Zu Gott, zu Gott flieg auf'] for soprano, alto, tenor, bass and piano (1815?)
- D Anh. I,24, Cantata "Kantate auf den Vater" ['?'] for unknown voices and piano (?) (1816, lost)

==== Part songs for mixed ensemble a capella ====
- D 329A, Canon "Das Grab" ['Das Grab ist tief und stille'] for mixed choir (1815, 1st setting; sketch)
- D 440, Chorus "Chor der Engel" ['Christ ist erstanden'] for mixed choir (1816)
- D 643A, Quartet "Das Grab" ['Das Grab ist tief und stille'] for soprano, alto, tenor and bass (1819, 5th setting)

=== Part songs for only male or only female voices ===
==== Part songs for male or female ensemble and piano ====
- D 169, Chorus "Trinklied vor der Schlacht" ['Schlacht, du brichst an!'] for double unison choir and piano (1815)
- D 170, Cantata "Schwertlied" ['Du Schwert an meiner Linken'] for voice, unison choir and piano (1815)
- D 183, Cantata "Trinklied" ['Ihr Freunde und du gold'ner Wein'] for voice, unison choir and piano (1815)
- Op. posth. 111 No. 1 – D 189, Cantata "An die Freude" ['Freude, schöner Götterfunken'] for voice, unison choir and piano (1815)
- D 330, Chorus "Das Grab" ['Das Grab ist tief und stille'] for unison choir and piano (1815, 2nd setting; scoring also possible for choir and piano)
- D 442, Chorus "Das große Halleluja" ['Ehre sei dem Hocherhabnen']; version for choir and piano (1816)
- D 443, Chorus "Schlachtlied" ['Mit unserm Arm ist nichts getan']; version for choir and piano, Schlachtgesang (1816, 1st setting)
- D 521, Chorus "Jagdlied" ['Trarah! Trarah! Wir kehren daheim']; version for unison choir and piano (1817)
- D 542, Duet "Antigone und Oedip" ['Ihr hohen Himmlischen'] for two voices and piano (1817, modified version with changes by Johann Michael Vogl)
- D 545, Duet "Der Jüngling und der Tod" ['Die Sonne sinkt, o könnt ich'] for two voices and piano (1817, 1st version)

==== Part songs for male or female ensemble a capella ====
- D 61, Canon "Ein jugendlicher Maienschwung" ['Ein jugendlicher Maienschwung'] for three voices (1813)
- D 69, Canon "Dreifach ist der Schritt der Zeit (Spruch des Konfuzius)" ['Dreifach ist der Schritt der Zeit'] for three voices (1813, 2nd setting)
- D 130, Canon "Der Schnee Zerrinnt" ['Der Schnee zerrinnt, der Mai beginnt'] for three voices (1815?, 1st setting)
- D 131, Canon "Lacrimoso son io" ['Lacrimoso son io'] for three voices (1815?, 1st and 2nd versions; 2nd version titled "Lacrimosa son io" ['Lacrimosa son io'])
- D 199, Duet "Mailied" ['Grüner wird die Au']; version for two voices (1815, 2nd setting)
- D 202, Duet "Mailied" ['Der Schnee zerrinnt, der Mai beginnt']; version for two voices (1815; 2nd setting of D 130, with a different title)
- D 203, Duet "Der Morgenstern" ['Stern der Liebe, Glanzgebilde!']; version for two voices (1815, 2nd setting)
- D 204, Duet "Jägerlied" ['Frisch auf, ihr Jäger']; version for two voices (1815)
- D 205, Duet "Lützows wilde Jagd" ['Was glänzt dort vom Walde im Sonnenschein?']; version for two voices (1815)
- D 244, Canon "Willkommen, lieber schöner Mai" ['Willkommen, lieber schöner Mai'] for three voices (1815?, 1st and 2nd versions)
- D 253, Duet "Punschlied. Im Norden zu singen" ['Auf der Berge freien Höhen'] for two voices (1815, 2nd version)
- D 357, Canon "Gold'ner Schein" ['Gold'ner Schein, deckt den Hain'] for three voices (1816)
- D 873, Canon ["?"] ['?'] in A major for six voices (1826?, sketch without text)
- D 988, Canon "Liebe säuseln die Blätter" ['Liebe säuseln die Blätter'] for three voices (1815?)
- D deest, Canon "Canon a trè" ['?'] in B♭ major for three voices (1816? fragment)
- D deest, Trio "?" ['?'] in D major for unspecified voices (date unknown, fragment without text)

==== Part songs for male ensemble and piano ====
- Op. 74 – D 37, Trio "Die Advokaten" ['Mein Herr, ich komm mich anzufragen'] for two tenors, bass and piano (1812)
- D 75, Cantata "Trinklied" ['Freunde, sammelt euch im Kreise'] for bass, men's choir and piano (1813)
- Op. posth. 134 – D 892, Cantata "Nachthelle" ['Die Nacht ist heiter'] for tenor solo, two tenors, two basses and piano (1826)
- D 140, Trio "Klage um Ali Bey" ['Laßt mich! Laßt mich! Ich will klagen'] for two tenors, bass and piano (1815, 1st version)
- Op. posth. 131 – No. 2 – D 148, Cantata "Trinklied" ['Brüder! unser Erdenwallen'] for tenor, men's choir and piano (1815)
- Op. posth. 169 – D 984, Quartet "Der Wintertag" ['In schöner heller Winterzeit ward eine Maid geboren'] for two tenors, two basses and piano, Geburtstaglied (after 1820, fragment; piano part is lost)
- D 267, Quartet "Trinklied" ['Auf! Jeder sei nun froh und sorgenfrei!'] for two tenors, two basses and piano (1815)
- D 268, Quartet "Bergknappenlied" ['Hinab, ihr Brüder, in den Schacht!'] for two tenors, two basses and piano (1815)
- D 269, Trio "Das Leben" ['Das Leben ist ein Traum'] for tenor, two basses and piano (1815, 1st version)
- D 277, Trio "Punschlied" ['Vier Elemente, inning gesellt'] for two tenors, bass and piano (1815)
- D 356, Quartet "Trinklied" ['Funkelnd im Becher so helle, so hold'] for two tenors, two basses and piano (1816, fragment)
- Op. 16 No. 2 – D 422, Quartet "Naturgenuß" ['Im Abendschimmer wallt der Quell'] for two tenors, two basses and piano (1822?, 2nd setting)
- D 513, Quartet "La pastorella al prato" ['La pastorella al prato'] for two tenors, two basses and piano, La Pastorella (1817?, 1st setting)
- D 569, Chorus "Das Grab" ['Das Grab ist tief und stille'] for unison men's choir and piano (1817, 4th setting)
- Op. 11 No. 1 – D 598, Quartet "Das Dörfchen" ['Ich rühme mir mein Dörfchen hier'] for two tenors, two basses and piano (1817, 2nd version [formerly D 641])
- D 705, Quartet "Gesang der Geister über den Wassern" ['Des Menschen Seele gleicht dem Wasser'] for two tenors, two basses and piano (1820, 3rd setting; sketch)
- D 710, Quartet "Im Gegenwärtigen Vergangenes" ['Ros und Lilie morgentaulich'] for two tenors, two basses and piano (1821?)
- Op. 11 No. 2 – D 724, Quartet "Die Nachtigall" ['Bescheiden verborgen im buschigten Gang'] for two tenors, two basses and piano (1821 or earlier)
- Op. 16 No. 1 – D 740, Quartet "Frühlingsgesang" ['Schmücket die Locken'] for two tenors, two basses and piano (1822, 2nd setting)
- Op. 11 No. 3 – D 747, Quartet "Geist der Liebe" ['Der Abend schleiert Flur und Hain'] for two tenors, two basses and piano (1822, 2nd setting)
- Op. 28 – D 809, Quartet "Gondelfahrer" ['Es tanzen Mond und Sterne'] for two tenors, two basses and piano (1824, 2nd setting)
- D 822, Cantata "Lied eines Kriegers" ['Des stolzen Männerlebens schönste Zeichen'] for bass, unison men's choir and piano (1824)
- D 865, Quartet "Widerspruch" ['Wenn ich durch Busch und Zweig'] for two tenors, two basses and piano (1828, 1st version)
- Op. 102 – D 875, Quintet "Mondenschein" ['Des Mondes Zauberblume lacht'] for two tenors, three basses and piano (1826)
- Op. 81 No. 3 – D 903, Cantata "Zur guten Nacht" ['Horch auf! Es schlägt die Stunde'] for baritone, men's choir and piano (1827)

==== Part song for male ensemble and guitar ====
- D 80, Trio "Zur Namensfeier meines Vaters" ['Ertöne, Leier, zur Festesfeier!'] for two tenors, bass and guitar (1813)

==== Part songs for male ensemble a capella ====
- D 38, Trio "Totengräberlied" ['Grabe, Spaten, grabe!'] for two tenors and bass (1813?, 1st setting)
- D 43, Trio "Dreifach ist der Schritt der Zeit (Spruch des Konfuzius)" ['Dreifach ist der Schritt der Zeit'] for two tenors and bass (1813, 1st setting)
- D 51, Trio "Unendliche Freude durchwallet das Herz" ['Unendliche Freude durchwallet das Herz'] for two tenors and bass (1813, 1st setting)
- D 53, Trio "Vorüber die stöhnende Klage" ['Vorüber, vorüber die stöhnende Klage'] for two tenors and bass (1813)
- D 54, Canon "Unendliche Freude durchwallet das Herz" ['Unendliche Freude durchwallet das Herz'] for three basses (1813, 2nd setting)
- D 55, Trio "Selig durch die Liebe" ['Selig durch die Liebe Götter'] for two tenors and bass (1813)
- D 57, Trio "Hier strecket der wallende Pilger" ['Hier strecket der wallende Pilger'] for two tenors and bass (1813)
- D 58, Trio "Dessen Fahne Donnerstürme wallte" ['Dessen Fahne Donnerstürme wallte'] for two tenors and bass (1813)
- D 60, Trio "Hier umarmen sich getreue Gatten" ['Hier umarmen sich getreue Gatten'] for two tenors and bass (1813)
- D 62, Trio "Thronend auf erhabnem Sitz" ['Thronend auf erhabnem Sitz'] for two tenors and bass (1813)
- D 63, Trio "Wer die steile Sternenbahn" ['Wer die steile Sternenbahn'] for two tenors and bass (1813)
- D 64, Trio "Majestät'sche Sonnenrosse" ['Majestät'sche Sonnenrosse'] for two tenors and bass (1813)
- D 65, Canon "Schmerz verzerret ihr Gesicht" ['Schmerz verzerret ihr Gesicht'] for two tenors and bass (1813, sketch)
- D 67, Trio "Frisch atmet des Morgens lebendiger Hauch" ['Frisch atmet des Morgens lebendiger Hauch'] for two tenors and bass (1813)
- D 70, Trio "Dreifach ist der Schritt der Zeit (Spruch des Konfuzius)" ['Dreifach ist der Schritt der Zeit'] for two tenors and bass (1813, 3rd setting; fragment)
- D 71, Trio "Die zwei Tugendwege" ['Zwei sind der Wege'] for two tenors and bass (1813)
- D 88, Canon "Verschwunden sind die Schmerzen" ['Verschwunden sind die Schmerzen'] for two tenors and bass (1813)
- D 129, Trio "Mailied" ['Grüner wird die Au und der Himmel'] for two tenors and bass (1815?, 1st setting)
- D 147, Trio "Bardengesang" ['Rolle, du strömigter Carun'] for two tenors and bass (1816?)
- D 242, Trio "Trinklied im Winter" ['Das Glas gefüllt!'] for two tenors and bass (1815, 1st setting; D deest is the 2nd setting, with a different title)
- D 243, Trio "Frühlingslied" ['Die Luft ist blau, das Tal ist grün'] for two tenors and bass (1815, 1st setting)
- D 331, Quartet "Der Entfernten" ['Wohl denk' ich allenthalben'] for two tenors and two basses (c. 1816, 1st setting; setting identical to the one originally catalogued as D 332)
- D 337, Quartet "Die Einsiedelei" ['Es rieselt klar und wehend ein Quell'] for two tenors and two basses (c. 1816, 1st setting)
- D 338, Quartet "An den Frühling" ['Willkommen, schöner Jüngling!'] for two tenors and two basses (c. 1816, 2nd setting)
- D 364, Quartet "Fischerlied" ['Das Fischergewerbe gibt rüstigen Mut'] for two tenors and two basses (1816 or 1817?, 2nd setting)
- D 377, Chorus "Das Grab" ['Das Grab ist tief und stille'] for men's choir and piano (1816, 3rd setting)
- D 407, Cantata "Beitrag zur fünfzigjährigen Jubelfeier des Herrn von Salieri" for two tenors, two basses and piano (1816)

1. Quartet "Gütigster, Bester! Weisester Größter!" for two tenors and two basses (1st and 2nd settings; 2nd setting [formerly D 441] for two tenors, bass and piano)
2. Aria "So Güt' als Weisheit strömen mild" for tenor and piano
3. Canon "Unser aller Großpapa, bleibe noch recht lange da" for three voices

- D 423, Trio "Andenken" ['Ich denke dein, wenn durch den Hain'] for two tenors and bass (1816, 2nd setting)
- D 424, Trio "Erinnerung" ['Am Seegestad, in lauen Vollmondnächten'] for two tenors and bass (1816, 2nd setting)
- D 425, Trio "Lebenslied" ['Kommen und scheiden, suchen und meiden'] for two tenors and bass (1816, lost; see also D Anh. I,23)
- D 426, Trio "Trinklied (Herr Bacchus ist ein braver Mann)" ['Herr Bacchus ist ein braver Mann'] for two tenors and bass (1816, lost)
- D 427, Trio "Trinklied im Mai" ['Bekränzet die Tonnen'] for two tenors and bass (1816)
- D 428, Trio "Widerhall" ['Auf ewig dein, wenn Berg und Meere trennen'] for two tenors and bass (1816)
- D 494, Quintet "Der Geistertanz" ['Die bretterne Kammer der Toten erbebt'] for two tenors and three basses (1816, 4th setting)
- D 538, Quartet "Gesang der Geister über den Wassern" ['Des Menschen Seele gleicht dem Wasser'] for two tenors and two basses (1817, 2nd setting)
- D 572, Quartet "Lied im Freien" ['Wie schön ist's im Freien'] for two tenors and two basses (1817)
- D 598, Quartet "Das Dörfchen" ['Ich rühme mir mein Dörfchen hier'] for two tenors and two basses (1817, 1st version; sketch without a piano part)
- D 635, Quartet "Leise, leise laßt uns singen" ['Leise, leise laßt uns singen'] for two tenors and two basses, Ruhe (1819)
- D 656, Quintet "Sehnsucht" ['Nur wer die Sehnsucht kennt'] for two tenors and three basses (1819, 4th setting)
- D 657, Quartet "Ruhe, schönstes Glück der Erde" ['Ruhe, schönstes Glück der Erde'] for two tenors and two basses (1819)
- D 709, Quartet "Frühlingsgesang" ['Schmücket die Locken mit duftigen Kränzen'] for two tenors and two basses (before 1822, 1st setting)
- D 778B, Quartet "Ich hab' in mich gesogen" ['Ich hab' in mich gesogen den Frühling treu und lieb'] for two tenors and two basses (1827?, sketch)
- Op. 64 No. 1 – D 825, Quartet "Wehmut" ['Die Abendglocke tönet'] for two tenors and two basses (pub. 1826)
- Op. 64 No. 2 – D 825A, Quartet "Ewige Liebe" ['Ertönet, ihr Saiten, in nächtlicher Ruh'] for two tenors and two basses (pub. 1826)
- Op. 64 No. 3 – D 825B, Quartet "Flucht" ['In der Freie will ich leben'] for two tenors and two basses (pub. 1825)
- Op. posth. 155 – D 847, Quartet "Trinklied aus dem 16. Jahrhundert" ['Edit Nonna, edit Clerus'] for two tenors and two basses (1825)
- Op. posth. 156 – D 848, Quartet "Nachtmusik" ['Wir stimmen dir mit Flötensang'] for two tenors and two basses (1825)
- D 873A, Quartet "Nachklänge" ['?'] for two tenors and two basses (?) (1826?, sketch without text)
- D 893, Quartet "Grab und Mond" ['Silberblauer Mondenschein fällt herab'] for two tenors and two basses (1826)
- D 901, Quartet "Wein und Liebe" ['Liebchen und der Saft der Reben'] for two tenors and two basses (1827)
- Op. posth. 151 – D 912, Chorus "Schlachtlied" ['Mit unserm Arm ist nichts getan'] for double men's choir (1827, 2nd setting)
- D 914, Quartet "Frühlingslied" ['Geöffnet sind des Winters Riegel'] for two tenors and two basses (1827, 1st setting)
- D 916, Quartet "Das stille Lied" ['Schweige nur, süßer Mund'] for two tenors and two basses (1827, sketch)
- Op. 17 No. 1 – D 983, Quartet "Jünglingswonne" ['So lang im deutschen Eichentale'] for two tenors and two basses (pub. 1823)
- Op. 17 No. 2 – D 983A, Quartet "Liebe" ['Liebe rauscht der Silberbach'] for two tenors and two basses (pub. 1823)
- Op. 17 No. 3 – D 983B, Quartet "Zum Rundetanz" ['Auf! es dunkelt; silbern funkelt'] for two tenors and two basses (pub. 1823)
- Op. 17 No. 4 – D 983C, Quartet "Die Nacht" ['Wie schön bist du, freundliche Stille'] for two tenors and two basses (pub. 1823)
- D Anh. I,18, Trio or Quartet "Lied beim Rundetanz" ['Auf, es dunkelt, silbern funkelt'] for two tenors and bass or two tenors and two basses [formerly D 132] (1815 or 1816, fragment)
- D Anh. I,19, Trio or Quartet "Lied im Freien" ['Wie schön ist's im Freien'] for two tenors and bass or two tenors and two basses [formerly D 133] (1815 or 1816, fragment)
- D Anh. I,20, Trio or Quartet "Amors Macht" ['Wo Amors Flügel weben'] for two tenors and bass or two tenors and two basses [formerly D 339] (1815 or 1816, fragment)
- D Anh. I,21, Trio or Quartet "Badelied" ['Zur Elbe, zur Elbe, des Äthers Gewölbe'] for two tenors and bass or two tenors and two basses [formerly D 340] (1815 or 1816, fragment)
- D Anh. I,22, Trio or Quartet "Sylphen" ['Was unterm Monde gleicht uns Sylphen flink und leicht'] for two tenors and bass or two tenors and two basses [formerly D 341] (1815 or 1816, fragment)
- D Anh. I,23, Trio or Quartet "Lebenslied" ['Kommen und scheiden, suchen und meiden'] for two tenors and bass or two tenors and two basses (1815 or 1816, fragment; see also D 425)

==== Part songs for female ensemble and piano ====
- D 140, Chorus "Klage um Ali Bey" ['Laßt mich! Laßt mich! Ich will klagen'] for women's choir and piano (1815, 1st version)
- D 269, Trio "Das Leben" ['Das Leben ist ein Traum'] for two sopranos, alto and piano (1815, 2nd version)
- Op. posth. 133 – D 757, Quartet "Gott in der Natur" ['Groß ist der Herr!'] for two sopranos, two altos and piano (1822)
- Op. posth. 135 – D 920, Cantata "Ständchen" ['Zögernd leise, in des Dunkels nächt'ger Hülle'] for alto, women's choir and piano, Notturno [formerly D 921] (1827, 2nd version)

== Series IV: Lieder ==
=== Lieder with orchestral accompaniment ===
- D 535, Song "Lied (Brüder, schrecklich brennt die Träne)" ['Brüder, schrecklich brennt die Träne'] for soprano and small orchestra (1817)

=== Lieder with chamber ensemble accompaniment ===
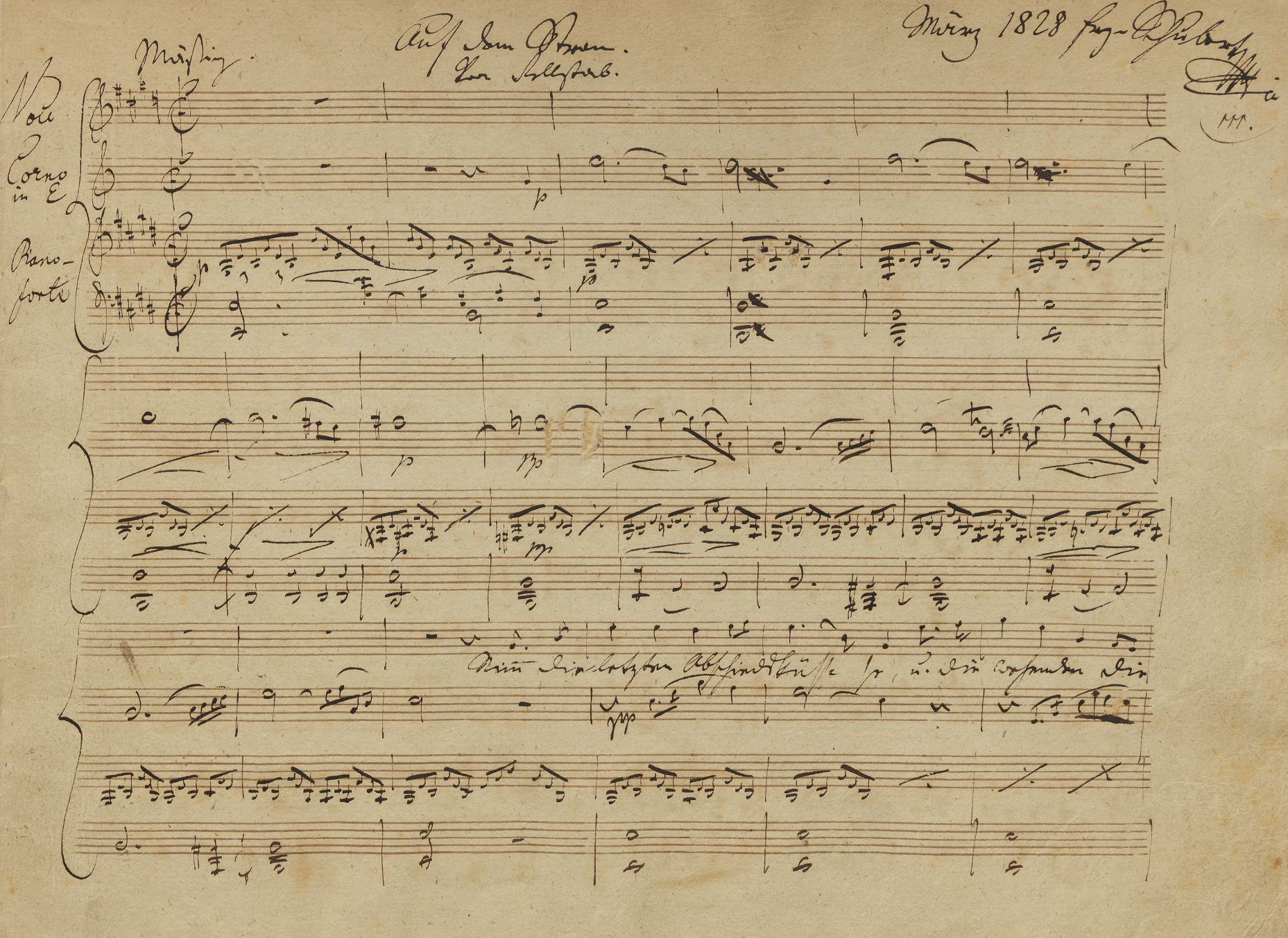
First page of the manuscript to Auf dem Strom, 1828

- D 81, Song "Auf den Sieg der Deutschen" ['Verschwunden sind die Schmerzen'] for voice, two violins and violoncello (1813)
- D 83, Song "Zur Namensfeier des Herrn Andreas Siller" ['Des Phöbus Strahlen'] for voice, violin and harp (1813)
- Op. posth. 119 – D 943, Song "Auf dem Strom" ['Nimm die letzten Abschiedsküsse'] for voice, horn (or violoncello) and piano (1828)
- Op. posth. 129 – D 965, Song "Der Hirt auf dem Felsen" ['Wenn auf dem höchsten Fels ich steh'] for voice, clarinet and piano (1828)

=== Lieder with piano accompaniment ===
==== Song cycles and song sets ====
- D 93, Song cycle Don Gayseros for voice and piano (1815?)
- Op. 12 – D 478, Song cycle Gesänge des Harfners aus "Wilhelm Meister" for voice and piano (1822)
- D 688, Song cycle Vier Canzonen for voice and piano (1820)
- Op. 25 – D 795, Song cycle Die schöne Müllerin for voice and piano (1823)
- Op. 52, Sieben Gesänge aus Walter Scotts "Fräulein am See" (1825)

No. 1 – D 837, Song "Ellens Gesang I" ['Raste, Krieger, Krieg ist aus'] for voice and piano (1825)
No. 2 – D 838, Song "Ellens Gesang II" ['Jäger, ruhe von der Jagd!'] for voice and piano (1825)
No. 5 – D 846, Song "Normans Gesang" ['Die Nacht bricht bald herein'] for voice and piano (1825)
No. 6 – D 839, Song "Ellens Gesang III (Hymne an die Jungfrau)" ['Ave Maria! Jungfrau mild'] for voice and piano, Ave Maria or Hymne an die Jungfrau (1825)
No. 7 – D 843, Song "Lied des gefangenen Jägers" ['Mein Roß so müd'] for voice and piano (1825)

- Op. posth. 124 – D 857, Two songs Zwei Szenen aus dem Schauspiel "Lacrimas" for voice and piano (1825)
- Op. 95 – D 866, Song cycle Vier Refrainlieder for voice and piano (1828?)
- Op. 62 – D 877, Song cycle Gesänge aus "Wilhelm Meister" (1826)
- Op. 83 – D 902, Three songs "Drei Gesänge" for bass and piano (1827)
- Op. 89 – D 911, Song cycle Winterreise for voice and piano (1827)
- D 957, Song cycle 13 Lieder nach Gedichten von Rellstab und Heine for voice and piano (1828, also appears as "Schwanengesang")

==== Lieder for soprano and piano ====
- D 42, Aria "Misero pargoletto" ['Misero pargoletto'] for soprano and piano (1813?, 1st setting: 1st and 2nd versions – both fragments, in addition to a 2nd setting)
- D 78, Aria "Son fra l'onde" ['Son fra l'onde in mezzo al mare'] for soprano and piano (1813)
- D 510, Aria "Vedi quanto adoro" ['Vedi quanto adoro'] for soprano and piano (1816, 1st, 2nd, 3rd and 4th versions; also appears as "Vedi quanto t'adoro")
- D 528, Arietta "La pastorella al prato" ['La pastorella al prato'] for soprano and piano, La Pastorella (1817, 2nd setting)
- D 990E, Aria "L'incanto degli occhi" ['Da voi, cari lumi'] for soprano and piano (1816?, 1st setting; fragment)
- D 990F, Aria "Ombre amene" ['Ombre amene'] for soprano and piano, La serenata (1816?, fragment; originally, the Deutsch catalogue incorrectly listed this entry as an early version of the song "Il traditor deluso")

==== Lieder for bass and piano ====
- D 1A, Song "Gesang in c" ['?'] for bass and piano (before 1810, fragment without text)
- D 44, Song "Totengräberlied" ['Grabe, Spaten, grabe!'] for bass and piano (1813, 2nd setting)
- D 52, Song "Sehnsucht" ['Ach, aus dieses Tales Gründen'] for bass and piano (1813, 1st setting)
- D 76, Aria "Pensa, che questo istante" ['Pensa, che questo istante'] for bass and piano (1813, 1st and 2nd versions)
- D 77, Song "Der Taucher" ['Wer wegt es, Rittersmann oder Knapp'] for bass and piano (1813–1815, 1st and 2nd versions; 2nd version was formerly D 111)
- D 104, Song "Die Befreier Europas in Paris" ['Sie sind in Paris!'] for bass and piano (1814, 1st, 2nd and 3rd versions)
- D 518, Song "An den Tod" ['Tod, du Schrecken der Natur'] for bass and piano (1816 or 1817)
- D 524, Song "Der Alpenjäger" ['Auf hohen Bergesrücken'] for bass and piano (1817, 2nd version)
- D 525, Song "Wie Ulfru fischt" ['Der Angel zuckt, die Rute bebt'] for bass and piano (1817, 1st version)
- Op. 21 No. 3 – D 525, Song "Wie Ulfru fischt" ['Der Angel zuckt, die Rute bebt'] for bass and piano (1817, 2nd version)
- D 526, Song "Fahrt zum Hades" ['Der Nachen dröhnt'] for bass and piano (1817)
- D 536, Song "Der Schiffer" ['Im winde, im Sturme befahr' ich den Fluß'] for bass and piano (1817?, 1st version)
- Op. 21 No. 2 – D 536, Song "Der Schiffer" ['Im winde, im Sturme'] for bass and piano (1817?, 2nd version)
- Op. 21 No. 1 – D 553, Song "Auf der Donau" ['Auf der Wellen Spiegel'] for bass and piano (1817)
- D 565, Song "Der Strom" ['Mein Leben wälzt sich murrend fort'] for bass and piano (1817?)
- Op. posth. 110 – D 594, Song "Der Kampf" ['Nein, länger werd' ich diesen Kampf nicht kämpfen'] for bass and piano (1817)
- Op. posth. 173 No. 6 – D 627, Song "Das Abendrot" ['Du heilig, glühend Abendrot!'] for bass and piano (1818)
- D 674, Song "Prometheus" ['Bedecke deinen Himmel, Zeus'] for bass and piano (1819)
- D 716, Song "Grenzen der Menschheit" ['Wenn der uralte heilige Vater'] for bass and piano (1821)
- D 721, Song "Mahomets Gesang" ['Seht den Felsenquell'] for bass and piano (1821, 2nd setting; fragment)
- Op. 23 No. 2 – D 743, Song "Selige Welt" ['Ich treibe auf des Lebens Meer'] for bass and piano (1822?)
- D 754, Song "Heliopolis II" ['Fels auf Felsen hingewälzet'] for bass and piano, Aus Heliopolis II (1822)
- D 778, Song "Greisengesang" ['Der Frost hat mir bereifet'] for bass and piano (1823, 1st and 2nd versions)
- Op. 60 No. 1 – D 778, Song "Greisengesang" ['Der Frost hat mir bereifet'] for bass and piano (1823, 3rd version)
- D 778A, Song "Die Wallfahrt" ['Meine Tränen im Bußgewand'] for bass and piano (1823?)
- D 785, Song "Der zürnende Barde" ['Wer wagt's, wer wagt's'] for bass and piano (1823)
- D 801, Song "Dithyrambe" ['Nimmer, das glaub mir, erscheinen die Götter'] for bass and piano (pub. 1826, 2nd setting; 1st version)
- Op. 60 No. 2 – D 801, Song "Dithyrambe" ['Nimmer, das glaub mir, erscheinen die Götter'] for bass and piano (pub. 1826, 2nd setting; 2nd version)
- D 805, Song "Der Sieg" ['O unbewölktes Leben'] for bass and piano (1824)

==== Lieder for any voice type and piano ====
- D 5, Song "Hagars Klage" ['Hier am Hügel heißen Sandes'] for voice and piano (1811)
- D 6, Song "Des Mädchens Klage" ['Der Eichwald brauset'] for voice and piano (1811 or 1812, 1st setting)
- D 7, Song "Leichenfantasie" ['Mit erstorbnem Scheinen'] for voice and piano (1811)
- D 10, Song "Der Vatermörder" ['Ein Vater starb von des Sohnes Hand'] for voice and piano (1811)
- D 15, Song "Der Geistertanz" ['Die bretterne Kammer der Toten erbebt'] for voice and piano (c. 1812, 1st setting; fragment)
- D 15A, Song "Der Geistertanz" ['Die bretterne Kammer der Toten erbebt'] for voice and piano [formerly D 15] (c. 1812, 2nd setting; fragment)
- Op. posth. 131 No. 3 – D 23, Song "Klaglied" ['Meine Ruh' ist dahin'] for voice and piano (1812)
- D 30, Song "Der Jüngling am Bache" ['An der Quelle saß der Knabe'] for voice and piano (1812, 1st setting)
- D 39, Song "Lebenstraum" ['Ich saß an einer Tempelhalle'] for voice and piano (1810?, sketch; also appears as "Ich saß an einer Tempelhalle")
- D 50, Song "Die Schatten" ['Freunde, deren Grüfte sich schon bemoosten!'] for voice and piano (1813)
- D 59, Song "Verklärung" ['Lebensfunke, vom Himmel erglüht'] for voice and piano (1813)
- D 73, Song "Thekla (eine Geisterstimme)" ['Wo ich sei, und wo mich hingewendet'] for voice and piano (1813, 1st setting)
- D 95, Song "Adelaide" ['Einsam wandelt dein Freund'] for voice and piano (1814)
- D 97, Song "Trost. An Elisa" ['Lehnst du deine bleichgehärmte Wange'] for voice and piano (1814)
- D 98, Song "Erinnerung" ['Am Seegestad, in lauen Vollmondnächten'] for voice and piano (1814, 1st setting; 2 versions; 1st version is a fragment)
- D 99, Song "Andenken" ['Ich denke dein, wenn durch den Hain'] for voice and piano (1814, 1st setting)
- D 100, Song "Geisternähe" ['Der Dämm'rung Schein durchblinkt den Hain'] for voice and piano (1814)
- D 101, Song "Erinnerung" ['Kein Rosenschimmer leuchtet'] for voice and piano, Todtenopfer (1814)
- D 102, Song "Die Betende" ['Laura betet!'] for voice and piano (1814)
- D 107, Song "Lied aus der Ferne" ['Wenn in des Abends letztem Scheine'] for voice and piano (1814, 1st and 2nd versions)
- D 108, Song "Der Abend" ['Purpur malt die Tannenhügel'] for voice and piano (1814)
- D 109, Song "Lied der Liebe" ['Durch Fichten am Hügel'] for voice and piano (1814)
- D 113, Song "An Emma" ['Weit in nebelgrauer Ferne'] for voice and piano (1814; 1st and 2nd versions, in addition to a modified 3rd version)
- Op. 58 No. 2 – D 113, Song "An Emma" ['Weit in nebelgrauer Ferne'] for voice and piano (1814, 3rd version)
- D 114, Song "Romanze" ['Ein Fräulein klagt' im finstern Turm'] for voice and piano (1814; 1st and 2nd versions, in addition to a variant of the 1st version)
- D 115, Song "An Laura, als sie Klopstocks Auferstehungslied sang" ['Herzen, die gen Himmel sich erheben'] for voice and piano (1814)
- D 116, Song "Der Geistertanz" ['Die bretterne Kammer der Toten erbebt'] for voice and piano (1814, 3rd setting)
- D 117, Song "Das Mädchen aus der Fremde" ['In einem Tal bei armen Hirten'] for voice and piano (1814, 1st setting)
- Op. 2 – D 118, Song "Gretchen am Spinnrade" ['Meine Ruh' ist hin, mein Herz ist schwer'] for voice and piano (1814)
- D 119, Song "Nachtgesang" ['O! gieb, vom weichen Pfühle'] for voice and piano (1814)
- D 120, Song "Trost in Tränen" ['Wie kommt's, daß du so traurig bist'] for voice and piano (1814)
- Op. 3 No. 1 – D 121, Song "Schäfers Klagelied" ['Da droben auf jenem Berge'] for voice and piano (1814, 1st version)
- D 121, Song "Schäfers Klagelied" ['Da droben auf jenem Berge'] for voice and piano (1814, 2nd version)
- D 122, Song "Ammenlied" ['Am hohen, hohen Turm'] for voice and piano (1814)
- D 123, Song "Sehnsucht" ['Was zieht mir das Herz so?'] for voice and piano (1814)
- D 124, Song "Am See" ['Sitz' ich im Gras am glatten See'] for voice and piano (1814, 1st and 2nd versions; 1st version is a fragment)
- D 126, Song "Szene aus Faust" ['Wie anders, Gretchen, war dir's'] for voice and piano (1814, 1st and 2nd versions)
- Op. posth. 126 – D 134, Song "Ballade" ['Ein Fräulein schaut vom hohen Turm'] for voice and piano (1815?)
- Op. 5 No. 1 – D 138, Song "Rastlose Liebe" ['Dem Schnee, dem Regen, dem Wind entgegen'] for voice and piano (1815, 1st version)
- D 138, Song "Rastlose Liebe" ['Dem Schnee, dem Regen, dem Wind entgegen'] for voice and piano (1815, 2nd version)
- Op. posth. 131 No. 1 – D 141, Song "Der Mondabend" ['Rhein und freundlich lacht der Himmel'] for voice and piano (1815)
- D 142, Song "Geistes-Gruß" ['Hoch auf dem alten Turme'] for voice and piano (1815 or 1816; 1st, 2nd, 3rd, 4th and 5th versions)
- Op. 92 No. 3 – D 142, Song "Geistes-Gruß" ['Hoch auf dem alten Turme'] for voice and piano (1815 or 1816, 6th version)
- Op. posth. 109 No. 2 – D 143, Song "Genügsamkeit" ['Dort raget ein Berg aus den Wolken her'] for voice and piano (1815)
- D 144, Song "Romanze" ['In der Väter Hallen ruhte'] for voice and piano (1816, sketch)
- D 149, Song "Der Sänger" ['Was hör' ich draußen vor dem Tor'] for voice and piano (1815, 1st version)
- Op. posth. 117 – D 149, Song "Der Sänger" ['Was hör' ich draußen vor dem Tor'] for voice and piano (1815, 2nd version)
- D 150, Song "Lodas Gespenst" ['Der bleiche, kalte Mond erhob sich in Osten'] for voice and piano (1816)
- D 151, Song "Auf einen Kirchhof" ['Sei gegrüßt, geweihte Stille'] for voice and piano (1815)
- D 152, Song "Minona" ['Wie treiben die Wolden so finster und schwer'] for voice and piano (1815)
- D 153, Song "Als ich sie erröten sah" ['All' mein Wirken, all' mein Leben'] for voice and piano (1815)
- Op. posth. 165 No. 3 – D 155, Song "Das Bild" ['Ein Mädchen ist's'] for voice and piano (1815)
- D 159, Song "Die Erwartung" ['Hör' ich das Pförtchen nicht gehen?'] for voice and piano (1816, 1st version)
- Op. posth. 116 – D 159, Song "Die Erwartung" ['Hör' ich das Pförtchen nicht gehen?'] for voice and piano (1816, 2nd version)
- D 160, Song "Am Flusse" ['Verfließet, vielgeliebte Lieder'] for voice and piano (1815, 1st setting)
- D 161, Song "An Mignon" ['Über Tal und Fluß getragen'] for voice and piano (1815, 1st version)
- Op. 19 No. 2 – D 161, Song "An Mignon" ['Über Tal und Fluß getragen'] for voice and piano (1815, 2nd version)
- D 162, Song "Nähe des Geliebten" ['Ich denke dein, wenn mir der Sonne Schimmer'] for voice and piano (1815, 1st version)
- Op. 5 No. 2 – D 162, Song "Nähe des Geliebten" ['Ich denke dein, wenn mir der Sonne Schimmer'] for voice and piano (1815, 2nd version)
- D 163, Song "Sängers Morgenlied" ['Süßes Licht! aus goldenen Pforten'] for voice and piano (1815, 1st setting)
- D 164, Song "Liebesrausch" ['Glanz des Guten und des Schönen strahlt mir dein hohes Bild'] for voice and piano (1815, 1st setting; fragment)
- D 165, Song "Sängers Morgenlied" ['Süßes Licht! aus goldenen Pforten'] for voice and piano (1815, 2nd setting)
- D 166, Song "Amphiaraos" ['Vor Thebens siebenfach gähnenden Toren'] for voice and piano (1815)
- D 171, Song "Gebet während der Schlacht" ['Vater, ich rufe dich!'] for voice and piano (1815, 2 versions)
- D 172, Song "Der Morgenstern" ['Stern der Liebe, Glanzgebilde!'] for voice and piano (1815, 1st setting; sketch)
- D 174, Song "Das war ich" ['Jüngst träumte mir'] for voice and piano (1815, 1st and 2nd versions; 2nd version is a sketch)
- D 176, Song "Die Sterne" ['Was funkelt ihr so mild mich an?'] for voice and piano (1815)
- Op. posth. 173 No. 3 – D 177, Song "Vergebliche Liebe" ['Ja, ich weiß es, diese treue Liebe'] for voice and piano (1815)
- D 177A, Song "Am ersten Mai" ['Ich ging mit ihr im Freien'] for voice and piano (before 1821, lost)
- D 179, Song "Liebesrausch" ['Dir, Mädchen, schlägt mit leisem Beben'] for voice and piano (1815, 2nd setting)
- D 180, Song "Sehnsucht der Liebe" ['Wie die Nacht mit heil'gem Beben'] for voice and piano (1815)
- D 182, Song "Die erste Liebe" ['Die erste Liebe füllt das Herz'] for voice and piano (1815)
- D 186, Song "Die Sterbende" ['Heil! dies ist die letzte Zähre'] for voice and piano (1815)
- D 187, Song "Stimme der Liebe" ['Abendgewölke schweben hell'] for voice and piano (1815, 1st setting)
- D 188, Song "Naturgenuß" ['Im Abendschimmer wallt der Quell'] for voice and piano (1815, 1st setting)
- D 190, Singspiel "Der vierjährige Posten" (1815)

5. Arie: Gott! Gott! höre meine Stimme (version for voice and piano)

- D 191, Song "Des Mädchens Klage" ['Der Eichwald braust'] for voice and piano (1815, 2nd setting; 1st version)
- Op. 58 No. 3 – D 191, Song "Des Mädchens Klage" ['Der Eichwald braust'] for voice and piano (1815, 2nd setting; 2nd version)
- D 192, Song "Der Jüngling am Bache" ['An der Quelle saß der Knabe'] for voice and piano (1815, 2nd setting)
- D 193, Song "An den Mond" ['Geuß, lieber Mond, geuß deine Silberflimmer'] for voice and piano (1815, 1st version)
- Op. 57 No. 3 – D 193, Song "An den Mond" ['Geuß, lieber Mond, geuß deine Silberflimmer'] for voice and piano (1815, 2nd version)
- D 194, Song "Die Mainacht" ['Wann der silberne Mond'] for voice and piano (1815)
- Op. posth. 173 No. 1 – D 195, Song "Amalia" ['Schön wie Engel voll Walhallas Wonne'] for voice and piano (1815)
- Op. posth. 172 No. 3 – D 196, Song "An die Nachtigall" ['Geuß nicht so laut der liebentflammten Lieder'] for voice and piano (1815)
- D 197, Song "An die Apfelbäume, wo ich Julien erblickte" ['Ein heilig Säuseln und ein Gesangeston'] for voice and piano (1815)
- D 198, Song "Seufzer" ['Die Nachtigall singt überall'] for voice and piano (1815)
- D 201, Song "Auf den Tod einer Nachtigall" ['Sie ist dahin, die Maienlieder tönte'] for voice and piano (1815, 1st setting; sketch)
- D 204A, Song "Das Traumbild" ['?'] for voice and piano (1815, lost)
- D 206, Song "Liebeständelei" ['Süßes Liebchen, komm zu mir!'] for voice and piano (1815)
- D 207, Song "Der Liebende" ['Beglückt, beglückt, wer dich erblickt'] for voice and piano (1815)
- D 208, Song "Die Nonne" ['Es liebt' in Welschland irgendwo'] for voice and piano (1815, 1st and 2nd versions; 1st version is a fragment; 2nd version was formerly D 212)
- Op. 38 – D 209, Song "Der Liedler" ['Gib, Schwester, mir die Harf herab'] for voice and piano (1815)
- D 210, Song "Die Liebe" ['Freudvoll und leidvoll, gedankenvoll sein'] for voice and piano, Klärchens Lied (1815)
- D 211, Song "Adelwold und Emma" ['Hoch, und ehern schier von Dauer'] for voice and piano (1815)
- Op. posth. 172 No. 1 – D 213, Song "Der Traum" ['Mir träumt' ich war ein Vögelein'] for voice and piano (1815)
- Op. posth. 172 No. 2 – D 214, Song "Die Laube" ['Nimmer werd' ich, nimmer dein vergessen'] for voice and piano (1815)
- D 215, Song "Jägers Abendlied" ['Im Felde schleich' ich still und wild'] for voice and piano (1815, 1st setting)
- D 215A, Song "Meeres Stille" ['Tiefe Stille herrscht im Wasser'] for voice and piano (1815, 1st setting)
- Op. 3 No. 2 – D 216, Song "Meeres Stille" ['Tiefe Stille herrscht im Wasser'] for voice and piano (1815, 2nd setting)
- D 217, Song "Kolmas Klage" ['Rund um mich Nacht'] for voice and piano (1815)
- D 218, Song "Grablied" ['Er fiel den Tod fürs Vaterland'] for voice and piano (1815)
- D 219, Song "Das Finden" ['Ich hab' ein Mädchen funden'] for voice and piano (1815)
- Op. posth. 118 No. 2 D 221, Song "Der Abend" ['Der Abend blüht'] for voice and piano (1815)
- D 222, Song "Lieb Minna" ['Schwüler Hauch weht mir herüber'] for voice and piano (1815, also appears as "Lieb Minna. Romanze")
- Op. 4 No. 3 – D 224, Song "Wandrers Nachtlied" ['Der du von dem Himmel bist'] for voice and piano (1815)
- D 225, Song "Der Fischer" ['Das Wasser rauscht', das Wasser schwoll'] for voice and piano (1815, 1st version and modified 2nd version with changes by Johann Michael Vogl)
- Op. 5 No. 3 – D 225, Song "Der Fischer" ['Das Wasser rauscht', das Wasser schwoll'] for voice and piano (1815, 2nd version)
- Op. 5 No. 4 – D 226, Song "Erster Verlust" ['Ach, wer bringt die schönen Tage'] for voice and piano (1815)
- D 227, Song "Idens Nachtgesang" ['Vernimm es, Nacht'] for voice and piano (1815)
- D 228, Song "Von Ida" ['Der Morgen blüht, der Osten glüht'] for voice and piano (1815)
- Op. 108 No. 3 – D 229, Song "Die Erscheinung" ['Ich lag auf grünen Matten'] for voice and piano (1815)
- Op. posth. 165 No. 4 – D 230, Song "Die Täuschung" ['Im Erlenbusch, im Tannerhain'] for voice and piano (1815)
- Op. posth. 172 No. 4 – D 231, Song "Das Sehnen" ['Wehmut, die mich hüllt'] for voice and piano (1815)
- Op. posth. 118 No. 1 D 233, Song "Geist der Liebe" ['Wer bist du, Geist der Liebe'] for voice and piano (1815)
- Op. posth. 118 No. 3 D 234, Song "Tischlied" ['Mich ergreift, ich weiß nicht wie, himmlisches Behagen'] for voice and piano (1815)
- D 235, Song "Abends unter der Linde" ['Woher, o namenloses Sehnen'] for voice and piano (1815, 1st setting)
- D 237, Song "Abends unter der Linde" ['Woher, o namenloses Sehnen'] for voice and piano (1815, 2nd setting; 2 versions)
- D 238, Song "Die Mondnacht" ['Siehe, wie die Mondesstrahlen'] for voice and piano (1815)
- D 240, Song "Huldigung" ['Ganz verloren, ganz versunken in dein Anschaun'] for voice and piano (1815)
- D 241, Song "Alles um Liebe" ['Was ist es, das die Seele füllt?'] for voice and piano (1815)
- D 246, Song "Die Bürgschaft" ['Zu Dionys, dem Tyrannen'] for voice and piano (1815)
- Op. posth. 118 No. 6 D 247, Song "Die Spinnerin" ['Als ich still und ruhig spann'] for voice and piano (1815)
- Op. posth. 118 No. 4 D 248, Song "Lob des Tokayers" ['O köstlicher Tokayer, o königlicher Wein'] for voice and piano (1815)
- D 250, Song "Das Geheimnis" ['Sie konnte mir kein Wörtchen sagen'] for voice and piano (1815, 1st setting)
- D 251, Song "Hoffnung" ['Es reden und träumen die Menschen viel'] for voice and piano (1815, 1st setting)
- D 252, Song "Das Mädchen aus der Fremde" ['In einem Tal bei armen Hirten'] for voice and piano (1815, 2nd setting)
- D 253, Song "Punschlied. Im Norden zu singen" ['Auf der Berge freien Höhen'] for voice and piano (1815, 1st version)
- D 254, Song "Der Gott und die Bajadere" ['Mahadöh, der Herr der Erde'] for voice and piano (1815, also appears as "Der Gott und die Bajadere. Indische Legende")
- D 255, Song "Der Rattenfänger" ['Ich bin der wohlbekannte Sänger'] for voice and piano (1815)
- D 256, Song "Der Schatzgräber" ['Arm am Beutel, krank am Herzen'] for voice and piano (1815)
- Op. 3 No. 3 – D 257, Song "Heidenröslein" ['Sah ein Knab' ein Röslein stehn'] for voice and piano (1815)
- D 258, Song "Bundeslied" ['In allen guten Stunden'] for voice and piano (1815)
- D 259, Song "An den Mond" ['Fullest wieder Busch und Tal'] for voice and piano (1815, 1st setting)
- Op. posth. 115 No. 2 – D 260, Song "Wonne der Wehmut" ['Trocknet nicht, trocknet nicht, Tränen der ewigen Liebe'] for voice and piano (1815)
- D 261, Song "Wer kauft Liebesgötter?" ['Von allen schönen Waren'] for voice and piano (1815, 2 versions)
- D 262, Song "Die Fröhlichkeit" ['Wess' Adern leichtes Blut durchspringt'] for voice and piano (1815)
- D 263, Song "Cora an die Sonne" ['Nach so vielen trüben Tagen'] for voice and piano (1815)
- D 264, Song "Der Morgenkuß" ['Durch eine ganze Nacht sich nah zu sein'] for voice and piano (1815, 1st and 2nd versions)
- D 265, Song "Abendständchen. An Lina" ['Sei sanft wie ihre Seele'] for voice and piano (1815)
- D 266, Song "Morgenlied" ['Willkommen, rotes Morgenlicht!'] for voice and piano (1815)
- Op. posth. 118 No. 5 D 270, Song "An die Sonne" ['Sinke, liebe Sonne'] for voice and piano (1815)
- D 271, Song "Der Weiberfreund" ['Noch fand von Evens Töchterscharen ich keine'] for voice and piano (1815)
- D 272, Song "An die Sonne" ['Königliche Morgensonne'] for voice and piano (1815)
- D 273, Song "Lilla an die Morgenröte" ['Wie schön bist du, du güldne Morgenröte'] for voice and piano (1815)
- D 274, Song "Tischlerlied" ['Mein Handwerk geht durch alle Welt'] for voice and piano (1815, 1st and 2nd versions)
- D 275, Song "Totenkranz für ein Kind" ['Sanft wehn, im Hauch der Abendluft'] for voice and piano (1815)
- D 276, Song "Abendlied" ['Groß und rotenflammet'] for voice and piano (1815)
- D 278, Song "Ossians Lied nach dem Falle Nathos" ['Beugt euch aus euren Wolken nieder'] for voice and piano (1815; 1st, 2nd and 3rd versions; 1st version is a fragment)
- D 280, Song "Das Rosenband" ['Im Frühlingsgarten fand ich sie'] for voice and piano (1815)
- D 281, Song "Das Mädchen von Inistore" ['Mädchen Inistores, wein auf dem Felsen'] for voice and piano (1815, 1st and 2nd versions)
- D 282, Song "Cronnan" ['Ich sitz' bei der moosigten Quelle'] for voice and piano (1815, 1st and 2nd versions)
- Op. posth. 172 No. 5 – D 283, Song "An den Frühling" ['Willkommen, schöner Jüngling!'] for voice and piano (1815, 1st setting)
- D 284, Song "Lied (Es ist so angenehm)" ['Es ist so angenehm, so süß'] for voice and piano (1815)
- D 285, Song "Furcht der Geliebten/An Cidli" ['Cidli, du weinest'] for voice and piano (1815, 1st and 2nd versions)
- D 286, Song "Selma und Selmar" ['Weine du nicht'] for voice and piano (1815, 1st and 2nd versions)
- D 287, Song "Vaterlandslied" ['Ich bin ein deutsches Mädchen'] for voice and piano (1815, 1st and 2nd versions)
- D 288, Song "An Sie" ['Zeit, Verkündigerin der besten Freuden'] for voice and piano (1815)
- D 289, Song "Die Sommernacht" ['Wenn der Schimmer von dem Monde'] for voice and piano (1815, 1st and 2nd versions)
- D 290, Song "Die frühen Gräber" ['Willkommen, o silberner Mond'] for voice and piano (1815)
- D 291, Song "Dem Unendlichen" ['Wie erhebt sich das Herz'] for voice and piano (1815, 1st, 2nd and 3rd versions)
- D 293, Song "Shilric und Vinvela" ['Mein Geliebter ist ein Sohn des Hügels'] for voice and piano (1815, 1st and 2nd versions)
- D 295, Song "Hoffnung" ['Schaff, das Tagwerk meiner Hände'] for voice and piano (1815 or 1816?, 1st and 2nd versions)
- D 296, Song "An den Mond" ['Füllest wieder Busch und Tal'] for voice and piano (1815 or 1816?, 2nd setting)
- D 297, Song "Augenlied" ['Süße Augen, klare Bronnen!'] for voice and piano (1817?, 1st and 2nd versions, in addition to a modified 2nd version)
- D 298, Song "Liane" ['Hast du Lianen nicht gesehen?'] for voice and piano (1815)
- D 300, Song "Der Jüngling an der Quelle" ['Leise, rieselnder Quell'] for voice and piano (1816 or 1817)
- D 301, Song "Lambertine" ['O Liebe, die mein Herz erfüllet'] for voice and piano (1815)
- D 302, Song "Labetrank der Liebe" ['Wenn im Spiele leiser Töne'] for voice and piano (1815)
- D 303, Song "An die Geliebte" ['O, daß ich dir vom stillen Auge'] for voice and piano (1815)
- D 304, Song "Wiegenlied" ['Schlumm're sanft! Noch an dem Mutterherzen'] for voice and piano (1815)
- D 305, Song "Mein Gruß an den Mai" ['Sei mir gegrüßt, o Mai'] for voice and piano (1815)
- D 306, Song "Skolie" ['Laßt im Morgenstrahl des Mai'n'] for voice and piano (1815)
- D 307, Song "Die Sternenwelten" ['Oben drehen sich die großen unbekannten Welten dort'] for voice and piano (1815)
- D 308, Song "Die Macht der Liebe" ['Überall, wohin mein Auge blicket'] for voice and piano (1815)
- D 309, Song "Das gestörte Glück" ['Ich hab' ein hießes junges Blut'] for voice and piano (1815)
- D 310, Song "Sehnsucht" ['Nur wer die Sehnsucht kennt'] for voice and piano (1815, 1st setting; 1st and 2nd versions)
- D 311, Song "An den Mond" ['?'] for voice and piano (1815?, sketch without text)
- D 312, Song "Hektors Abschied" ['Will sich Hektor ewig von mir wenden'] for voice and piano (1815, 1st version)
- Op. 58 No. 1 – D 312, Song "Hektors Abschied" ['Will sich Hektor ewig von mir wenden'] for voice and piano (1815, 2nd version)
- D 313, Song "Die Sterne" ['Wie wohl ist mir im Dunkeln!'] for voice and piano (1815)
- D 314, Song "Nachtgesang" ['Tiefe Feier schauert um die Welt'] for voice and piano (1815, 1st and 2nd versions)
- D 315, Song "An Rosa I" ['Warum bist du nicht hier'] for voice and piano (1815, 1st and 2nd versions)
- D 316, Song "An Rosa II" ['Rosa, denskt du an mich?'] for voice and piano (1815, 1st and 2nd versions)
- D 317, Song "Idens Schwanenlied" ['Wie schaust du aus dem Nebelflor'] for voice and piano (1815, 1st and 2nd versions)
- D 318, Song "Schwangesang" ['Endlich stehn die Pforten offen'] for voice and piano (1815)
- D 319, Song "Luisens Antwort" ['Wohl weinen Gottes Engel'] for voice and piano (1815, 1st and 2nd versions)
- D 320, Song "Der Zufriedene" ['Zwar schuf das Glück hienieden'] for voice and piano (1815)
- D 321, Song "Mignon" ['Kennst du das Land'] for voice and piano (1815, 1st and 2nd versions)
- D 322, Song "Hermann und Thusnelda" ['Ha, dort kömmt er'] for voice and piano (1815, 1st and 2nd versions)
- D 323, Song "Klage der Ceres" ['Ist der holde Lenz erschienen?'] for voice and piano (1816; the last part, "O so laßt euch froh begrüssen" was formerly D 991; original version, in addition to both a variant of mm. 142–203 and a modified version)
- D 325, Song "Harfenspieler" ['Wer sich der Einsamkeit ergibt'] for voice and piano (1815, 1st setting)
- D 327, Song "Lorma" ['Lorma saß in der Halle von Aldo'] for voice and piano (1815, 1st setting; fragment)
- D 328, Song "Erlkönig" ['Wer reitet so spät durch Nacht und Wind?'] for voice and piano (1815, 1st, 2nd and 3rd versions)
- Op. 1 – D 328, Song "Erlkönig" ['Wer reitet so spät durch Nacht und Wind?'] for voice and piano (1815, 4th version)
- D 329, Song "Die drei Sänger" ['Der König saß beim frohen Mahle'] for voice and piano (1815, fragment)
- D 342, Song "An mein Klavier" ['Sanftes Klavier, welche Entzückungen schaffest du mir'] for voice and piano, Seraphine an ihr Klavier (c. 1816)
- D 343, Song "Am Tage Aller Seelen" ['Ruhn in Frieden alle Seelen'] for voice and piano, Litanei auf das Fest Aller Seelen (1816, 1st and 2nd versions)
- D 344, Song "Am ersten Maimorgen" ['Heute will ich fröhlich sein'] for voice and piano (1816?)
- D 350, Song "Der Entfernten" ['Wohl denk' ich allenthalben'] for voice and piano (1816?, 2nd setting)
- D 351, Song "Fischerlied" ['Das Fischergewerbe gibt rüstigen Mut'] for voice and piano (1816?, 1st setting)
- D 358, Song "Die Nacht" ['Du verstörst uns nicht, o Nacht!'] for voice and piano (1816, 1st and 2nd versions)
- D 359, Song "Sehnsucht" ['Nur wer die Sehnsucht kennt'] for voice and piano, Lied der Mignon (1816, 2nd setting)
- Op. 65 No. 1 – D 360, Song "Lied eines Schiffers an die Dioskuren" ['Dioskuren, Zwillingssterne'] for voice and piano (1816)
- Op. posth. 109 No. 1 – D 361, Song "Am Bach im Frühling" ['Du brachst sie nun, die kalte Rinde'] for voice and piano (1816, 1st version)
- D 361, Song "Am Bach im Frühling" ['Du brachst sie nun, die kalte Rinde'] for voice and piano (1816, 2nd version)
- D 362, Song "Zufriedenheit" ['Ich bin vergnügt'] for voice and piano (1816?, 1st setting)
- D 363, Song "An Chloen" ['Die Munterkeit ist meinen Wangen'] for voice and piano (1816, fragment)
- Op. 3 No. 4 – D 368, Song "Jägers Abendlied" ['Im Felde schleich' ich still und wild'] for voice and piano (1816?, 2nd setting)
- Op. 5 No. 5 – D 367, Song "Der König in Thule" ['Es war ein König in Thule'] for voice and piano (1816)
- D 368, Song "Jägers Abendlied" ['Im Felde schleich' ich still und wild'] for voice and piano (1816?, 2nd setting; modified version with changes by Johann Michael Vogl)
- Op. 19 No. 1 – D 369, Song "An Schwager Kronos" ['Spute dich, Kronos!'] for voice and piano (1816)
- D 371, Song "Klage" ['Trauer umfließt mein Leben'] for voice and piano (1816, 1st and 2nd versions; 1st version [formerly D 292] is a sketch)
- D 372, Song "An die Natur" ['Süße, heilige Natur'] for voice and piano (1816, 1st and 2nd versions)
- D 373, Song "Lied (Mutter geht durch ihre Kammern)" ['Mutter geht durch ihre Kammern'] for voice and piano (1816?)
- D 375, Song "Der Tod Oskars" ['Warum öffnest du wieder'] for voice and piano (1816)
- D 376, Song "Lorma" ['Lorma saß in der Halle von Aldo'] for voice and piano (1816, 2nd setting; fragment)
- D 381, Song "Morgenlied" ['Die frohe, neubelebte Flur'] for voice and piano (1816)
- D 382, Song "Abendlied" ['Sanft glänzt die Abendsonne'] for voice and piano (1816)
- D 388, Song "Laura am Klavier" ['Wenn dein Finger durch die Saiten meistert'] for voice and piano (1816, 1st and 2nd versions)
- D 389, Song "Des Mädchens Klage" ['Der Eichwald braust'] for voice and piano (1816, 3rd setting)
- D 390, Song "Entzückung an Laura" ['Laura, über diese Welt'] for voice and piano (1816, 1st setting)
- Op. posth. 111 No. 3 – D 391, Song "Die vier Weltalter" ['Wohl perlet im Glase'] for voice and piano (1816)
- D 392, Song "Pflügerlied" ['Arbeitsam und wacker'] for voice and piano (1816)
- D 393, Song "Die Einsiedelei" ['Es rieselt, klar und wehend'] for voice and piano (1816, 2nd setting)
- D 394, Song "An die Harmonie" ['Schöpferin beseelter Töne!'] for voice and piano, Gesang an die Harmonie (1816)
- Op. posth. 111 No. 2 – D 395, Song "Lebens-Melodien" ['Auf den Wassern wohnt mein stilles Leben'] for voice and piano (1816)
- D 396, Song "Gruppe aus dem Tartarus" ['Horch, wie Murmeln des empörten Meeres'] for voice and piano (1816, 1st setting; fragment)
- D 397, Song "Ritter Toggenburg" ['Ritter, treue Schwesterliebe'] for voice and piano (1816, 1st and 2nd versions)
- D 398, Song "Frühlingslied" ['Die Luft ist blau'] for voice and piano (1816, 2nd setting)
- D 399, Song "Auf den Tod einer Nachtigall" ['Sie ist dahin'] for voice and piano (1816, 2nd setting)
- D 400, Song "Die Knabenzeit" ['Wie glücklich, wem das Knabenkleid'] for voice and piano (1816)
- D 401, Song "Winterlied" ['Keine Blumen blühn'] for voice and piano (1816)
- D 402, Song "Der Flüchtling" ['Frisch atmet des Morgens lebendiger Hauch'] for voice and piano (1816)
- D 403, Song "Lied (In's stille Land)" ['In's stille Land'] for voice and piano (1816, 4 versions; the 1st edition of the 1st version has a four-measure introduction composed by Anton Diabelli)
- D 404, Song "Die Herbstnacht" ['Mit leisen Harfentönen'] for voice and piano, Die Wehmuth (1816, 1st and 2nd versions)
- D 405, Song "Der Herbstabend" ['Abendglockenhalle zittern'] for voice and piano (1816, 1st and 2nd versions)
- D 406, Song "Abschied von der Harfe" ['Noch einmal tön, o Harfe'] for voice and piano (1816, 1st and 2nd versions)
- D 409, Song "Die verfehlte Stunde" ['Quälend ungestilltes Sehnen'] for voice and piano (1816, 1st and 2nd versions)
- Op. posth. 115 No. 3 – D 410, Song "Sprache der Liebe" ['Laß dich mit gelinden Schlägen rühren'] for voice and piano (1816)
- D 411, Song "Daphne am Bach" ['Ich hab' ein Bächlein funden'] for voice and piano (1816)
- D 412, Song "Stimme der Liebe (Meine Selinde)" ['Meine Selinde'] for voice and piano (1816, 1st and 2nd versions)
- D 413, Song "Entzückung" ['Tag voll Himmel!'] for voice and piano (1816)
- D 414, Song "Geist der Liebe" ['Der Abend schleiert Flur und Hain'] for voice and piano (1816, 1st setting)
- D 415, Song "Klage" ['Die Sonne steigt, die Sonne sinkt'] for voice and piano (1816)
- D 416, Song "Lied in der Abwesenheit" ['Ach, mir ist das Herz so schwer'] for voice and piano (1816, fragment)
- D 418, Song "Stimme der Liebe (Abendgewölke)" ['Abendgewölke schweben hell'] for voice and piano, Abendgewölke (1816, 2nd setting)
- D 419, Song "Julius an Theone" ['Nimmer, nimmer darf ich dir gestehen'] for voice and piano (1816)
- D 429, Song "Minnelied" ['Holder klingt der Vogelsang'] for voice and piano (1816)
- D 430, Song "Die frühe Liebe" ['Schon im bunten Knabenkleide'] for voice and piano (1816, 1st and 2nd versions)
- D 431, Song "Blumenlied" ['Es ist ein halbes Himmelreich'] for voice and piano (1816)
- D 432, Song "Der Leidende" ['Nimmer trag' ich langer'] for voice and piano, Klage (1816, 1st, 2nd and 3rd versions)
- D 433, Song "Seligkeit" ['Freuden sonder Zahl'] for voice and piano (1816)
- D 434, Song "Erntelied" ['Sicheln Schallen, Ähren fallen'] for voice and piano (1816)
- D 436, Song "Klage" ['Dein Silber schien durch Eichengrün'] for voice and piano (1816; 1st and 2nd versions, in addition to a variant of the 1st version; 2nd version was formerly D 437)
- D 442, Song "Das große Halleluja" ['Ehre sei dem Hocherhabnen']; version for voice and piano (1816)
- D 443, Song "Schlachtlied" ['Mit unserm Arm ist nichts getan']; version for voice and piano, Schlachtgesang (1816, 1st setting)
- D 444, Song "Die Gestirne" ['Es tönet sein Lob'] for voice and piano (1816)
- D 445, Song "Edone" ['Dein süßes Bild, Edone'] for voice and piano (1816)
- D 446, Song "Die Liebesgötter" ['Cypris, meiner Phyllis gleich'] for voice and piano (1816)
- D 447, Song "An den Schlaf" ['Komm und senke die umflorten Schwingen'] for voice and piano (1816)
- D 448, Song "Gott im Frühlinge" ['In seinem schimmernden Gewand'] for voice and piano (1816, 1st and 2nd versions)
- D 449, Song "Der gute Hirt" ['Was sorgest du?'] for voice and piano (1816, original and modified versions)
- D 450, Song "Fragment aus dem Aeschylus" ['So wird der Mann'] for voice and piano (1816, 1st and 2nd versions)
- D 454, Song "Grablied auf einen Soldaten" ['Zieh hin, du braver Krieger du!'] for voice and piano (1816)
- D 455, Song "Freude der Kinderjahre" ['Freude, die im frühen Lenze'] for voice and piano (1816)
- D 456, Song "Das Heimweh (Oft in einsam stillen Stunden)" ['Oft in einsam stillen Stunden'] for voice and piano (1816)
- Op. 44 – D 457, Song "An die untergehende Sonne" ['Sonne, du sinkst'] for voice and piano (1816 sketch, finished 1817)
- D 458, Song "Aus Diego Manazares. Ilmerine" ['Wo irrst du durch einsame Schatten'] for voice and piano (1816, also appears as "Aus Diego Manzanares")
- D 462, Song "An Chloen" ['Bei der Liebe reinsten Flammen'] for voice and piano (1816)
- D 463, Song "Hochzeit-Lied" ['Will singen euch im alten Ton'] for voice and piano (1816)
- D 464, Song "In der Mitternacht" ['Todesstille deckt das Tal'] for voice and piano (1816)
- D 465, Song "Trauer der Liebe" ['Wo die Taub' in stillen Buchen'] for voice and piano (1816, 1st and 2nd versions)
- D 466, Song "Die Perle" ['Es ging ein Mann zur Frühlingszeit'] for voice and piano (1816)
- D 467, Song "Pflicht und Liebe" ['Du, der ewig um mich trauert'] for voice and piano (1816, fragment)
- D 468, Song "An den Mond" ['Was schauest du so hell'] for voice and piano (1816)
- D 469, Song "Mignon (So laßt mich scheinen, bis ich werde)" ['So laßt mich scheinen, bis ich werde'] for voice and piano (1816, 1st setting; 1st and 2nd versions; both are fragments)
- D 473, Song "Liedesend" ['Auf seinem gold'nen Throne'] for voice and piano (1816, 1st and 2nd versions)
- D 474, Song "Lied des Orpheus, als er in die Hölle ging" ['Wälze dich hinweg'] for voice and piano (1816, 1st and 2nd versions)
- D 475, Song "Abschied" ['Über die Berge zieht ihr fort'] for voice and piano (1816, also appears as "Abschied. Nach einer Wallfahrts-Arie bearbeitet")
- D 476, Song "Rückweg" ['Zum Donaustrom, zur Kaiserstadt'] for voice and piano (1816)
- D 477, Song "Alte Liebe rostet nie" ['Alte Liebe rostet nie'] for voice and piano (1816)
- D 481, Song "Sehnsucht" ['Nur wer die Sehnsucht kennt'] for voice and piano, Lied der Mignon (1816, 3rd setting)
- D 482, Song "Der Sänger am Felsen" ['Klage, meine Flöte, klage'] for voice and piano (1816)
- D 483, Song "Lied (Ferne von der großen Stadt)" ['Ferne von der großen Stadt'] for voice and piano (1816)
- D 484, Song "Gesang der Geister über den Wassern" ['Des Menschen Seele gleicht dem Wasser'] for voice and piano (1816, 1st setting; fragment)
- D 489, Song "Der Wanderer" ['Ich komme vom Gebirge her'] for voice and piano, Der Unglückliche (1816, 1st and 2nd versions; 2nd version was formerly D 493)
- Op. 4 No. 1 – D 489, Song "Der Wanderer" ['Ich komme vom Gebirge her'] for voice and piano, Der Unglückliche (1816, 3rd version [formerly D 493])
- D 490, Song "Der Hirt" ['Du Turm, zu meinem Leide'] for voice and piano (1816)
- D 491, Song "Geheimnis" ['Sag an, wer lehrt dich Lieder'] for voice and piano (1816)
- D 492, Song "Zum Punsche" ['Woget brausend, Harmonien'] for voice and piano (1816)
- D 495, Song "Abendlied der Fürstin" ['Der Abend rötet nun das Tal'] for voice and piano (1816)
- D 496, Song "Bei dem Grabe meines Vaters" ['Friede sei um diesen Grabstein her!'] for voice and piano (1816)
- D 496A, Song "Klage um Ali Bey" ['Laßt mich! Laßt mich! ich will klagen'] for voice and piano (1816, 2nd version)
- Op. 98 No. 1 – D 497, Song "An die Nachtigall" ['Er liegt und schläft'] for voice and piano (1816)
- Op. 98 No. 2 – D 498, Song "Wiegenlied" ['Schlafe, schlafe, holder süßer Knabe'] for voice and piano (1816)
- D 499, Song "Abendlied" ['Der Mond is aufgegangen'] for voice and piano (1816)
- D 500, Song "Phidile" ['Ich war erst sechzehn Sommer alt'] for voice and piano (1816)
- D 501, Song "Zufriedenheit" ['Ich bin vergnügt'] for voice and piano (1816, 2nd setting; 1st and 2nd versions)
- D 502, Song "Herbstlied" ['Bunt sind schon die Wälder'] for voice and piano (1816)
- D 503, Song "Mailied" ['Grüner wird die Au'] for voice and piano (1816, 3rd setting)
- Op. 6 No. 3 – D 504, Song "Am Grabe Anselmos" ['Daß ich dich verloren habe'] for voice and piano (1816, 1st version)
- D 504, Song "Am Grabe Anselmos" ['Daß ich dich verloren habe'] for voice and piano (1816, 2nd version)
- D 507, Song "Skolie" ['Mädchen entsiegelten, Brüder, die Flaschen'] for voice and piano (1816)
- D 508, Song "Lebenslied" ['Kommen und Scheiden'] for voice and piano (1816)
- D 509, Song "Leiden der Trennung" ['Vom Meere trennt sich die Welle'] for voice and piano (1816, 1st and 2nd versions)
- D 513A, Song "Nur wer die Liebe kennt" ['Nur wer die Liebe kennt'] for voice and piano (1817?, sketch)
- Op. 7 No. 1 – D 514, Song "Die abgeblühte Linde" ['Wirst du halten, was du schwurst'] for voice and piano (1817?)
- Op. 7 No. 2 – D 515, Song "Der Flug der Zeit" ['Es floh die Zeit im Wirbelfluge'] for voice and piano (1817?)
- Op. 8 No. 2 – D 516, Song "Sehnsucht" ['Der Lerche wolkennahe Lieder'] for voice and piano (1816?)
- Op. 13 No. 1 – D 517, Song "Der Schäfer und der Reiter" ['Ein Schäfer saß im Grünen'] for voice and piano (1817)
- Op. posth. 173 No. 5 – D 519, Song "Die Blumensprache" ['Es deuten die Blumen des Herzens Gefühle'] for voice and piano (1817?)
- D 520, Song "Frohsinn" ['Ich bin von lockerem Schlage'] for voice and piano (1817, 1st and 2nd versions)
- D 521, Song "Jagdlied" ['Trarah! Trarah! Wir kehren daheim']; version for voice and piano (1817)
- D 522, Song "Die Liebe" ['Wo weht der Liebe hoher Geist?'] for voice and piano (1817)
- D 523, Song "Trost" ['Nimmer lange weil' ich hier'] for voice and piano (1817)
- D 524, Song "Der Alpenjäger" ['Auf hohen Bergesrücken'] for voice and piano (1817, 1st version)
- Op. 13 No. 3 – D 524, Song "Der Alpenjäger" ['Auf hohen Bergesrücken'] for voice and piano (1817, 3rd version)
- D 527, Song "Schlaflied" ['Es mahnt der Wald'] for voice and piano, Abendlied or Schlummerlied (1817, 1st version)
- Op. 24 No. 2 – D 527, Song "Schlaflied" ['Es mahnt der Wald'] for voice and piano, Abendlied or Schlummerlied (1817, 2nd version)
- Op. posth. 109 No. 3 – D 530, Song "An eine Quelle" ['Du kleine grünumwachs'ne Quelle'] for voice and piano (1817)
- Op. 7 No. 3 – D 531, Song "Der Tod und das Mädchen" ['Vorüber, ach vorüber'] for voice and piano (1817)
- D 532, Song "Das Lied vom Reifen" ['Seht meine lieben Bäume an'] for voice and piano (1817, fragment)
- D 533, Song "Täglich zu singen" ['Ich danke Gott und freue mich'] for voice and piano (1817)
- D 534, Song "Die Nacht" ['Die Nacht ist dumpfig und finster'] for voice and piano (1817)
- Op. 8 No. 4 – D 539, Song "Am Strome" ['Ist mir's doch, als sei mein Leben'] for voice and piano (1817)
- D 540, Song "Philoktet" ['Da sitz' ich ohne Bogen'] for voice and piano (1817)
- Op. 6 No. 1 – D 541, Song "Memnon" ['Den Tag hindurch nur einmal mag ich sprechen'] for voice and piano (1817)
- D 543, Song "Auf dem See" ['Und frische Nahrung'] for voice and piano (1817, 1st version)
- Op. 92 No. 2 – D 543, Song "Auf dem See" ['Und frische Nahrung'] for voice and piano (1817, 2nd version)
- Op. 19 No. 3 – D 544, Song "Ganymed" ['Wie im Morgenglanze'] for voice and piano (1817)
- D 545, Song "Der Jüngling und der Tod" ['Die Sonne sinkt, o könnt ich'] for voice and piano (1817, 2nd version)
- D 546, Song "Trost im Liede" ['Braust des Unglücks Sturm empor'] for voice and piano (1817, 1st version)
- Op. posth. 101 No. 3 – D 546, Song "Trost im Liede" ['Braust des Unglücks Sturm empor'] for voice and piano (1817, 2nd version)
- D 547, Song "An die Musik" ['Du holde Kunst'] for voice and piano (1817, 1st version)
- Op. 88 No. 4 – D 547, Song "An die Musik" ['Du holde Kunst'] for voice and piano (1817, 2nd version)
- D 548, Song "Orest" ['Ist dies Tauris'] for voice and piano (1817, also appears as "Orest auf Tauris")
- D 549, Song "Mahomets Gesang" ['Seht den Felsenquell'] for voice and piano (1817, 1st setting; fragment)
- D 550, Song "Die Forelle" ['In einem Bächlein helle'] for voice and piano (1816–1821, 1st, 2nd, 3rd and 5th versions)
- Op. 32 – D 550, Song "Die Forelle" ['In einem Bächlein helle'] for voice and piano (1816–1821, 4th version)
- D 551, Song "Pax vobiscum" ['Der Friede sei mit euch!'] for voice and piano (1817)
- D 552, Song "Hänflings Liebeswerbung" ['Ahidi! ich liebe'] for voice and piano (1817, 1st version)
- Op. 20 No. 3 – D 552, Song "Hänflings Liebeswerbung" ['Ahidi! ich liebe'] for voice and piano (1817, 2nd version)
- D 554, Song "Uraniens Flucht" ['Laßt uns, ihr Himmlischen, ein Fest begehen!'] for voice and piano (1817)
- D 555, Song ["?"] ['?'] for voice and piano "Liedentwurf in a" (1817?, sketch without text)
- D 558, Song "Liebhaber in allen Gestalten" ['Ich wollt', ich wär' ein Fisch'] for voice and piano (1817)
- D 559, Song "Schweizerlied" ['Uf'm Bergli bin i g'sässe'] for voice and piano (1817)
- D 560, Song "Der Goldschmiedsgesell" ['Es ist doch meine Nachbarin'] for voice and piano (1817)
- D 561, Song "Nach einem Gewitter" ['Auf den Blumen'] for voice and piano (1817)
- D 562, Song "Fischerlied" ['Das Fischergewerbe gibt rüstigen Mut!'] for voice and piano (1817, 3rd setting)
- D 563, Song "Die Einsiedelei" ['Es rieselt, klar und wehend'] for voice and piano (1817, 3rd setting)
- D 564, Song "Gretchen im Zwinger" ['Ach neige, du Schmerzensreiche'] for voice and piano, Gretchens Bitte (1817, fragment)
- D 573, Song "Iphigenia" ['Blüht denn hier an Tauris Strande'] for voice and piano (1817, 1st and 2nd versions)
- Op. 98 No. 3 – D 573, Song "Iphigenia" ['Blüht denn hier an Tauris Strande'] for voice and piano (1817, 3rd version)
- D 577, Song "Entzückung an Laura" ['Laura, Laura, über diese Welt'] for voice and piano (1817, 2nd setting; 2 fragments of a sketch)
- D 578, Song "Abschied" ['Lebe wohl! Du lieber Freund!'] for voice and piano (1817)
- D 579, Song "Der Knabe in der Wiege" ['Er schläft so süß'] for voice and piano (1817, 1st and 2nd versions; 2nd version is a fragment)
- D 579A, Song "Vollendung" ['Wenn ich einst das Ziel errungen habe'] for voice and piano [formerly D 989] (1817)
- D 579B, Song "Die Erde" ['Wenn sanft entzückt mein Auge sieht'] for voice and piano [formerly D 989A] (1817)
- Op. 24 No. 1 – D 583, Song "Gruppe aus dem Tartarus" ['Horch, wie Murmeln des empörten Meeres'] for voice and piano (1817, 2nd setting)
- D 584, Song "Elysium" ['Vorüber die stöhnende Klage!'] for voice and piano (1817)
- D 585, Song "Atys" ['Der Knabe seufzt übers grüne Meer'] for voice and piano (1817)
- Op. 8 No. 3 – D 586, Song "Erlafsee" ['Mir ist so wohl, so weh' '] for voice and piano (1817)
- D 587, Song "An den Frühling" ['Willkommen, schöner Jüngling!'] for voice and piano (1817, 3rd setting; 1st and 2nd versions; 2nd version was formerly D 245)
- D 588, Song "Der Alpenjäger" ['Willst du nicht das Lämmlein hüten?'] for voice and piano (1817, 1st version)
- Op. 37 No. 2 – D 588, Song "Der Alpenjäger" ['Willst du nicht das Lämmlein hüten?'] for voice and piano (1817, 2nd version)
- D 595, Song "Thekla (eine Geisterstimme)" ['Wo ich sei und wo mich hingewendet'] for voice and piano (1817, 2nd setting; 1st version)
- Op. 88 No. 2 – D 595, Song "Thekla (eine Geisterstimme)" ['Wo ich sei und wo mich hingewendet'] for voice and piano (1817, 2nd setting; 2nd version)
- D 596, Song "Lied eines Kindes" ['Lauter Freude fühl' ich'] for voice and piano (1817, fragment)
- D 611, Song "Auf der Riesenkoppe" ['Hoch auf dem Gipfel deiner Gebirge'] for voice and piano (1818)
- D 614, Song "An den Mond in einer Herbstnacht" ['Freundlich ist dein Antlitz'] for voice and piano (1818)
- D 616, Song "Grablied für die Mutter" ['Hauche milder, Abendluft'] for voice and piano (1818)
- D 620, Song "Einsamkeit" ['Gib mir die Fülle der Einsamkeit!'] for voice and piano (1818)
- D 622, Song "Der Blumenbrief" ['Euch Blümlein will ich senden'] for voice and piano (1818)
- D 623, Song "Das Marienbild" ['Sei gegrüßt, du Frau der Huld'] for voice and piano (1818)
- D 626, Song "Blondel zu Marien" ['In düstrer Nacht'] for voice and piano (1818)
- D 628, Song "Sonett" ['Apollo, lebet noch dein hold Verlangen'] for voice and piano, Sonett I (1818)
- D 629, Song "Sonett" ['Allein, nachdenklich, wie gelähmt vom Krampfe'] for voice and piano, Sonett II (1818)
- D 630, Song "Sonett" ['Nunmehr, da Himmel, Erde schweigt'] for voice and piano, Sonett III (1818)
- D 631, Song "Blanka" ['Wenn mich einsam Lüfte fächeln'] for voice and piano, Das Mädchen (1818)
- D 632, Song "Vom Mitleiden Mariä" ['Als bei dem Kreuz Maria stand'] for voice and piano (1818)
- Op. 57 No. 1 – D 633, Song "Der Schmetterling" ['Wie soll ich nicht tanzen'] for voice and piano (1819 and 1823?)
- Op. 57 No. 2 – D 634, Song "Die Berge" ['Sieht uns der Blick gehoben'] for voice and piano (1819 and 1823?)
- D 636, Song "Sehnsucht" ['Ach, aus dieses Tales Gründen'] for voice and piano (1821?, 2nd setting; 1st and 2nd versions)
- Op. 39 – D 636, Song "Sehnsucht" ['Ach, aus dieses Tales Gründen'] for voice and piano (1821?, 2nd setting; 3rd version)
- Op. 87 No. 2 – D 637, Song "Hoffnung" ['Es reden und träumen die Menschen viel'] for voice and piano (c. 1819, 2nd setting)
- D 638, Song "Der Jüngling am Bache" ['An der Quelle saß der Knabe'] for voice and piano (1819, 3rd setting; 1st version)
- Op. 87 No. 3 – D 638, Song "Der Jüngling am Bache" ['An der Quelle saß der Knabe'] for voice and piano (1819, 3rd setting; 2nd version)
- D 639, Song "Widerschein" ['Fischer harrt am Brückenbogen'] for voice and piano (1820, 1st and 2nd versions; 2nd version ['Harrt ein Fischer auf der Brücke'] was formerly D 949)
- D 645, Song "Abend" ['Wie ist es denn, daß trüb und schwer'] for voice and piano (1819, fragment of a sketch)
- D 646, Song "Die Gebüsche" ['Es wehet kühl und leise'] for voice and piano (1819)
- D 649, Song "Der Wanderer" ['Wie deutlich des Mondes Licht zu mir spricht'] for voice and piano (1819, 1st version)
- Op. 65 No. 2 – D 649, Song "Der Wanderer" ['Wie deutlich des Mondes Licht'] for voice and piano (1819, 2nd version)
- D 650, Song "Abendbilder" ['Still beginnt's im Hain zu tauen'] for voice and piano (1819)
- D 651, Song "Himmelsfunken" ['Der Odem Gottes weht'] for voice and piano (1819)
- D 652, Song "Das Mädchen" ['Wie so innig, möcht ich sagen'] for voice and piano (1819, 1st and 2nd versions)
- D 653, Song "Bertas Lied in der Nacht" ['Nacht umhüllt mit wehendem Flügel'] for voice and piano (1819)
- D 654, Song "An die Freunde" ['Im Wald, im Wald, da grabt mich ein'] for voice and piano (1819)
- D 658, Song "Geistliches Lied" ['Ich sehe dich in tausend Bildern'] for voice and piano [formerly "Marie"] (1819?)
- D 659, Song "Hymne" ['Wenige wissen das Geheimnis der Liebe'] for voice and piano (1819; also appears as "Hymne I")
- D 660, Song "Geistliches Lied" ['Wenn ich ihn nur habe'] for voice and piano (1819; also appears as "Hymne II")
- D 661, Song "Geistliches Lied" ['Wenn alle untreu werden'] for voice and piano (1819; also appears as "Hymne III")
- D 662, Song "Geistliches Lied" ['Ich sag' es jedem, daß er lebt'] for voice and piano (1819; also appears as "Hymne IV")
- D 663, Hymn "Der 13. Psalm" ['Ach Herr, wie lange willst du mein so ganz vergessen?'] for voice and piano (1819, fragment)
- Op. 56 No. 1 – D 767, Song "Willkommen und Abschied" ['Es schlug mein Herz'] for voice and piano (1822, 2nd version)
- D 669, Song "Beim Winde" ['Es traümen die Wolken'] for voice and piano (1819)
- D 670, Song "Die Sternennächte" ['In monderhellten Nächten'] for voice and piano (1819, 1st version)
- Op. posth. 165 No. 2 – D 670, Song "Die Sternennächte" ['In monderhellten Nächten'] for voice and piano (1819, 2nd version)
- D 671, Song "Trost" ['Hörnerklänge rufen klangend'] for voice and piano (1819)
- D 672, Song "Nachtstück" ['Wenn über Berge sich der Nebel breitet'] for voice and piano (1819, 1st version)
- Op. 36 No. 2 – D 672, Song "Nachtstück" ['Wenn über Berge sich der Nebel breitet'] for voice and piano (1819, 2nd version)
- D 673, Song "Die Liebende schreibt" ['Ein Blick von deinen Augen'] for voice and piano (1819, 1st version)
- Op. posth. 165 No. 1 – D 673, Song "Die Liebende schreibt" ['Ein Blick von deinen Augen'] for voice and piano (1819, 2nd version)
- D 677, Song "Strophe aus 'Die Götter Griechenlands'" ['Schöne Welt, wo bist du?'] for voice and piano (1819, 1st and 2nd versions)
- D 682, Song "Über allen Zauber Liebe" ['Sie hüpfte mit mir auf grünem Plan'] for voice and piano (1820 and 1824, fragment)
- D 684, Song "Die Sterne" ['Du staunest, o Mensch'] for voice and piano (1820)
- Op. 4 No. 2 – D 685, Song "Morgenlied" ['Eh' die Sonne früh aufersteht'] for voice and piano (1820)
- D 686, Song "Frühlingsglaube" ['Die linden Lüfte sind erwacht'] for voice and piano (1820, 1st and 2nd versions)
- Op. 20 No. 2 – D 686, Song "Frühlingsglaube" ['Die linden Lüfte sind erwacht'] for voice and piano (1820, 3rd version)
- D 687, Song "Nachthymne" ['Hinüber wall' ich'] for voice and piano (1820)
- D 690, Song "Abendröte" ['Tiefer sinket schon die Sonne'] for voice and piano (1823)
- Op. posth. 172 No. 6 – D 691, Song "Die Vögel" ['Wie lieblich und fröhlich'] for voice and piano (1820)
- D 692, Song "Der Knabe" ['Wenn ich nur ein Vöglein wäre'] for voice and piano (1820)
- D 693, Song "Der Fluß" ['Wie rein Gesang sich windet'] for voice and piano (1820)
- D 694, Song "Der Schiffer" ['Friedlich lieg' ich hingegossen'] for voice and piano (1820)
- D 695, Song "Namenstagslied" ['Vater, schenk' mir diese Stunde'] for voice and piano (1820?)
- D 698, Song "Des Fräuleins Liebeslauschen" ['Hier unten steht ein Ritter'] for voice and piano (1820)
- D 699, Song "Der entsühnte Orest" ['Zu meinen Füßen brichst du dich'] for voice and piano (1820)
- D 700, Song "Freiwilliges Versinken" ['Wohin? o Helios!'] for voice and piano (1820)
- Op. 8 No. 1 – D 702, Song "Der Jüngling auf dem Hügel" ['Ein Jüngling auf dem Hügel'] for voice and piano (1820)
- Op. 36 No. 1 – D 707, Song "Der zürnenden Diana" ['Ja, spanne nur den Bogen'] for voice and piano (1820, 2nd version)
- D 707, Song "Der zürnenden Diana" ['Ja, spanne nur den Bogen'] for voice and piano (1820, 2nd version)
- D 708, Song "Im Walde" ['Windes Rauschen, Gottes Flügel'] for voice and piano, Waldesnacht (1820)
- D 711, Song "Lob der Tränen" ['Laue Lüfte, Blumendüfte'] for voice and piano (1818?, 1st version)
- Op. 13 No. 2 – D 711, Song "Lob der Tränen" ['Laue Lüfte, Blumendüfte'] for voice and piano (1818?, 2nd version)
- D 712, Song "Die gefangenen Sänger" ['Hörst du von den Nachtigallen'] for voice and piano (1821)
- D 713, Song "Der Unglückliche" ['Die Nacht bricht an'] for voice and piano (1821, 1st version)
- Op. 87 No. 1 – D 713, Song "Der Unglückliche" ['Die Nacht bricht an'] for voice and piano (1821, 2nd version)
- D 715, Song "Versunken" ['Voll Locken kraus ein Haupt so rund'] for voice and piano (1821, 1st and 2nd versions)
- Op. 31 – D 717, Song "Suleika II" ['Ach um deine feuchten Schwingen'] for voice and piano (1821)
- Op. 14 No. 2 – D 719, Song "Geheimes" ['Über meines Liebchens Äugeln'] for voice and piano (1821)
- D 720, Song "Suleika I" ['Was bedeutet die Bewegung?'] for voice and piano (1821, 1st version)
- Op. 14 No. 1 – D 720, Song "Suleika I" ['Was bedeutet die Bewegung?'] for voice and piano (1821, 2nd version)
- D 726, Song "Mignon I" ['Heiß mich nicht reden, heiß mich schweigen'] for voice and piano (1821, 1st setting)
- D 727, Song "Mignon II" ['So laßt mich scheinen, bis ich werde'] for voice and piano (1821, 2nd setting)
- D 728, Song "Johanna Sebus" ['Der Damm zerreißt'] for voice and piano (1821, fragment)
- Op. posth. 173 No. 4 – D 731, Song "Der Blumen Schmerz" ['Wie tönt es mir so schaurig'] for voice and piano (1821)
- D 732, Opera "Alfonso und Estrella" (1821–1822)

8. Arie: Doch im Getümmel der Schlacht (version for voice and piano)
13. Arie: Wenn ich dich, Holde, sehe (version for voice and piano)

- D 736, Song "Ihr Grab" ['Dort ist ihr Grab'] for voice and piano (1822?)
- Op. 56 No. 2 – D 737, Song "An die Leier" ['Ich will von Atreus Söhnen'] for voice and piano (1822 or 1823?)
- Op. 56 No. 3 – D 738, Song "Im Haine" ['Sonnenstrahlen durch die Tannen'] for voice and piano (1822 or 1823?)
- Op. 20 No. 1 – D 741, Song "Sei mir gegrüßt" ['O du Entriß'ne mir'] for voice and piano (1821–1822)
- Op. 23 No. 3 – D 744, Song "Schwanengesang" ['Wie klag' ich's aus das Sterbegefühl'] for voice and piano (1822?)
- Op. 68 – D 742, Song "Der Wachtelschlag" ['Ach! mir schallt's dorten so lieblich hervor'] for voice and piano (pub. 1822)
- Op. 73 – D 745, Song "Die Rose" ['Es lockte schöne Wärme'] for voice and piano (1822, 1st version)
- D 745, Song "Die Rose" ['Es lockte schöne Wärme'] for voice and piano (1822, 2nd version)
- D 746, Song "Am See" ['In des Sees Wogenspiele'] for voice and piano (1822 or 1823?)
- D 749, Song "Herrn Josef Spaun, Assessor in Linz" ['Und nimmer schreibst du?'] for voice and piano (1822)
- Op. 23 No. 1 – D 751, Song "Die Liebe hat gelogen" ['Die Liebe hat gelogen, die Sorge lastet schwer'] for voice and piano (1822)
- D 752, Song "Nachtviolen" ['Nachtviolen, Nachtviolen'] for voice and piano (1822)
- Op. 65 No. 3 – D 753, Song "Heliopolis I" ['Im kalten, rauhen Norden ist Kunde mir geworden'] for voice and piano, Aus Heliopolis I or Im Hochgebirge (1822)
- D 756, Song "Du liebst mich nicht" ['Mein Herz ist zerrissen, du liebst mich nicht!'] for voice and piano (1822, 1st version)
- Op. 59 No. 1 D 756, Song "Du liebst mich nicht" ['Mein Herz ist zerrissen, du liebst mich nicht!'] for voice and piano (1822, 2nd version)
- D 758, Song "Todesmusik" ['In des Todes Feierstunde'] for voice and piano (1822, 1st version)
- Op. 108 No. 2 – D 758, Song "Todesmusik" ['In des Todes Feierstunde'] for voice and piano (1822, 2nd version)
- D 761, Song "Schatzgräbers Begehr" ['In tiefster Erde ruht ein alt Gesetz'] for voice and piano (1822, 1st version)
- Op. 23 No. 4 – D 761, Song "Schatzgräbers Begehr" ['In tiefster Erde ruht ein alt Gesetz'] for voice and piano (1822, 2nd version)
- D 762, Song "Schwestergruß" ['Im Mondenschein' wall' ich auf und ab'] for voice and piano (1822)
- D 764, Song "Der Musensohn" ['Durch Feld und Wald zu schweifen'] for voice and piano (1822, 1st version)
- Op. 92 No. 1 – D 764, Song "Der Musensohn" ['Durch Feld und Wald zu schweifen'] for voice and piano (1822, 2nd version)
- D 765, Song "An die Entfernte" ['So hab' ich wirklich dich verloren?'] for voice and piano (1822)
- D 766, Song "Am Flusse" ['Verfließest, vielgeliebte Lieder'] for voice and piano (1822, 2nd setting)
- D 767, Song "Willkommen und Abschied" ['Es schlug mein Herz'] for voice and piano (1822, 1st version)
- Op. 96 No. 3 – D 768, Song "Wandrers Nachtlied" ['Über allen Gipfeln ist Ruh'] for voice and piano (1824)
- Op. 71 – D 770, Song "Drang in die Ferne" ['Vater, du glaubst es nicht'] for voice and piano (1823)
- Op. 22 No. 1 – D 771, Song "Der Zwerg" ['Im trüben Licht verschwinden schon die Berge'] for voice and piano (1822?)
- Op. 22 No. 2 – D 772, Song "Wehmut" ['Wenn ich durch Wald und Fluren geh' '] for voice and piano (1822 or 1823?)
- Op. 72 – D 774, Song "Auf dem Wasser zu singen" ['Mitten im Schimmer der spiegelnden Wellen'] for voice and piano (1823)
- Op. 59 No. 2 – D 775, Song "Daß sie hier gewesen" ['Daß der Ostwind Düfte hauchet'] for voice and piano (1823?)
- Op. 59 No. 3 – D 776, Song "Du bist die Ruh" ['Du bist die Ruh, der Friede mild'] for voice and piano (1823)
- Op. 59 No. 4 – D 777, Song "Lachen und Weinen" ['Lachen und Weinen zu jeglicher Stunde'] for voice and piano (1823)
- Op. posth. 123 – D 786, Song "Viola" ['Schneeglöcklein, o Schneeglöcklein'] for voice and piano (1823)
- D 788, Song "Lied (Des Lebens Tag ist schwer und schwül)" ['Des Lebens Tag ist schwer und schwül'] for voice and piano, Die Mutter Erde (1823)
- D 789, Song "Pilgerweise" ['Ich bin ein Waller auf der Erde'] for voice and piano (1823)
- D 792, Song "Vergißmeinnicht" ['Als der Frühling'] for voice and piano (1823)
- Op. posth. 173 No. 2 – D 793, Song "Das Geheimnis" ['Sie konnte mir kein Wörtchen sagen'] for voice and piano (1823, 2nd setting)
- D 794, Song "Der Pilgrim" ['Noch in meines Lebens Lenze'] for voice and piano (1823, 1st version)
- Op. 37 No. 1 – D 794, Song "Der Pilgrim" ['Noch in meines Lebens Lenze'] for voice and piano (1823, 2nd version)
- D 799, Song "Im Abendrot" ['Oh, wie schön ist deine Welt'] for voice and piano (1824 or 1825, 1st and 2nd versions)
- Op. 41 – D 800, Song "Der Einsame" ['Wenn meine Grillen schwirren'] for voice and piano (1825)
- D 806, Song "Abendstern" ['Was weilst du einsam an dem Himmel'] for voice and piano (1824)
- D 807, Song "Auflösung" ['Verbirg dich, Sonne'] for voice and piano (1824)
- D 808, Song "Gondelfahrer" ['Es tanzen Mond und Sterne'] for voice and piano (1824, 1st setting)
- D 827, Song "Nacht und Träume" ['Heil'ge Nacht, du sinkest nieder!'] for voice and piano (1823, 1st version)
- Op. 43 No. 2 – D 827, Song "Nacht und Träume" ['Heil'ge Nacht, du sinkest nieder!'] for voice and piano (1823, 2nd version)
- Op. 43 No. 1 – D 828, Song "Die junge Nonne" ['Wie braust durch die Wipfel'] for voice and piano (1825)
- D 829, Melodrama "Leb' wohl du schöne Erde" ['Leb' wohl du schöne Erde'] for spoken voice and piano (1826, also appears as "Abschied" or "Abschied von der Erde")
- Op. 85 No. 1 – D 830, Song "Lied der Anne Lyle" ['Wärst du bei mir im Lebenstal'] for voice and piano (1825?)
- Op. 85 No. 2 – D 831, Song "Gesang der Norna" ['Mich führt mein Weg wohl meilenlang'] for voice and piano (1825)
- D 832, Song "Des Sängers Habe" ['Schlagt mein ganzes Glück in Splitter'] for voice and piano (1825)
- D 833, Song "Der blinde Knabe" ['O sagt, ihr Lieben, mir einmal'] for voice and piano (1825, 1st version and modified 2nd version)
- Op. posth. 101 No. 2 – D 833, Song "Der blinde Knabe" ['O sagt, ihr Lieben, mir einmal'] for voice and piano (1825, 2nd version)
- D 834, Song "Im Walde" ['Ich wandre über Berg und Tal'] for voice and piano (1825, 1st version)
- Op. 93 No. 1 – D 834, Song "Im Walde" ['Ich wandre über Berg und Tal'] for voice and piano (1825, 2nd version)
- Op. 52, Sieben Gesänge aus Walter Scotts 'Fräulein am See' No. 1 D 837, Song "Ellens Gesang I" ['Raste, Krieger, Krieg ist aus'] for voice and piano (1825)
- Op. 52, Sieben Gesänge aus Walter Scotts 'Fräulein am See' No. 2 D 838, Song "Ellens Gesang II" ['Jäger, ruhe von der Jagd!'] for voice and piano (1825)
- Op. 52, Sieben Gesänge aus Walter Scotts 'Fräulein am See' No. 6 D 839, Song "Ellens Gesang III (Hymne an die Jungfrau)" ['Ave Maria! Jungfrau mild'] for voice and piano, Ave Maria or Hymne an die Jungfrau (1825)
- D 842, Song "Totengräbers Heimwehe" ['O Menschheit, o Leben, was soll's?'] for voice and piano (1825)
- Op. 52, Sieben Gesänge aus Walter Scotts 'Fräulein am See' No. 7 D 843, Song "Lied des gefangenen Jägers" ['Mein Roß so müd'] for voice and piano (1825)
- Op. 52, Sieben Gesänge aus Walter Scotts 'Fräulein am See' No. 5 D 846, Song "Normans Gesang" ['Die Nacht bricht bald herein'] for voice and piano (1825)
- D 851, Song "Das Heimweh" ['Ach, der Gebirgssohn'] for voice and piano (1825, 1st version)
- Op. 79 No. 1 – D 851, Song "Das Heimweh" ['Ach, der Gebirgssohn'] for voice and piano (1825, 2nd version)
- Op. 79 No. 2 – D 852, Song "Die Allmacht" ['Groß ist Jehovah, der Herr'] for voice and piano (1825, 1st setting)
- D 852, Song "Die Allmacht" ['Groß ist Jehova, der Herr'] for voice and piano (1825, 1st setting; modified version)
- D 853, Song "Auf der Bruck" ['Frisch trabe sonder Ruh' und Rast'] for voice and piano (1825, 1st version)
- Op. 93 No. 2 – D 853, Song "Auf der Bruck" ['Frisch trabe sonder Ruh und Rast'] for voice and piano (1825, 2nd version)
- D 854, Song "Fülle der Liebe" ['Ein sehnend Streben teilt mir das Herz'] for voice and piano (1825)
- D 855, Song "Wiedersehn" ['Der Frühlingssonne holdes Lächeln'] for voice and piano (1825)
- Op. 88 No. 1 – D 856, Song "Abendlied für die Entfernte" ['Hinaus mein Blick, hinaus ins Tal'] for voice and piano (1825)
- D 860, Song "An mein Herz" ['O Herz, sei endlich stille'] for voice and piano (1825)
- D 861, Song "Der liebliche Stern" ['Ihr Sternlein, still in der Höhe'] for voice and piano (1825)
- D 862, Song "Um Mitternacht" ['Keine Stimme hör' ich schallen'] for voice and piano (1825 and 1826?, 1st version)
- Op. 88 No. 3 – D 862, Song "Um Mitternacht" ['Keine Stimme hör' ich schallen'] for voice and piano (1825 and 1826?, 2nd version)
- D 863, Song "An Gott" ['Kein Auge hat dein Angesicht geschaut'] for voice and piano (1827 or earlier, lost)
- D 864, Song "Das Totenhemdchen" ['Starb das Kindlein'] for voice and piano (after 1824, lost)
- Op. 105 No. 1 – D 865, Song "Widerspruch" ['Wenn ich durch Busch und Zweig'] for voice and piano (1828, 2nd version)
- Op. 105 No. 2 – D 867, Song "Wiegenlied" ['Wie sich der Äuglein kindlicher Himmel'] for voice and piano (1826 or 1827)
- D 869, Song "Totengräber-Weise" ['Nicht so düster und so bleich'] for voice and piano (1826)
- Op. 80 No. 1 – D 870, Song "Der Wanderer an den Mond" ['Ich auf der Erd', am Himmel du'] for voice and piano (1826)
- D 871, Song "Das Zügenglöcklein" ['Kling die Nacht durch, klinge'] for voice and piano (1826, 1st version)
- Op. 80 No. 2 – D 871, Song "Das Zügenglöcklein" ['Kling die Nacht durch, klinge'] for voice and piano (1826, 2nd version)
- D 874, Song "O Quell, was strömst du rasch und wild" ['O Quell, was strömst du rasch und wild'] for voice and piano (1826?, sketch)
- D 876, Song "Im Jänner 1817" ['Ich bin von aller Ruh' geschieden'] for voice and piano, Tiefes Leid (1826)
- Op. 105 No. 3 – D 878, Song "Am Fenster" ['Ihr lieben Mauern hold und traut'] for voice and piano (1826)
- Op. 105 No. 4 – D 879, Song "Sehnsucht" ['Die Scheibe friert, der Wind ist rauh'] for voice and piano (1826)
- Op. 80 No. 3 – D 880, Song "Im Freien" ['Draußen in der weiten Nacht'] for voice and piano (1826)
- D 881, Song "Fischerweise" ['Den Fischer fechten Sorgen und Gram und Leid nicht an'] for voice and piano (1826, 1st version)
- Op. 96 No. 4 – D 881, Song "Fischerweise" ['Den Fischer fechten Sorgen und Gram und Leid nicht an'] for voice and piano (1826, 2nd version)
- D 882, Song "Im Frühling" ['Still sitz' ich an des Hügels Hang'] for voice and piano (1826, 1st version)
- Op. posth. 101 No. 1 – D 882, Song "Im Frühling" ['Still sitz' ich an des Hügels Hang'] for voice and piano (1826, 2nd version)
- D 883, Song "Lebensmut" ['O wie dringt das junge Leben'] for voice and piano (1826)
- Op. 108 No. 1 – D 884, Song "Über Wildemann" ['Die Winde sausen am Tannenhang'] for voice and piano (1826)
- D 888, Song "Trinklied" ['Bacchus, feister Fürst des Weins'] for voice and piano (1826)
- D 889, Song "Ständchen" ['Horch, horch! die Lerch im Ätherblau'] for voice and piano (1826)
- D 890, Song "Hippolits Lied" ['Laßt mich, ob ich auch still verglüh'] for voice and piano (1826)
- D 891, Song "Gesang" [Was ist Sylvia?] for voice and piano (1826)
- Op. 106 No. 4 – D 891, Song "An Sylvia" ['Was ist Silvia, saget an'] for voice and piano, Gesang (1826)
- D 896, Song "Fröhliches Scheiden" ['Gar fröhlich kann ich scheiden'] for voice and piano (1827–1828, sketch)
- D 896A, Song "Sie in jedem Liede" ['Nehm ich die Harfe'] for voice and piano (1827–1828, sketch)
- D 896B, Song "Wolke und Quelle" ['Auf meinen heimischen Bergen'] for voice and piano (1827–1828, sketch)
- Op. 81 No. 1 – D 904, Song "Alinde" ['Die Sonne sinkt in's tiefe Meer'] for voice and piano (1827)
- Op. 81 No. 2 – D 905, Song "An die Laute" ['Leiser, leiser, kleine Laute'] for voice and piano (1827)
- D 906, Song "Der Vater mit dem Kind" ['Dem Vater liegt das kind in Arm'] for voice and piano (1827)
- D 907, Song "Romanze des Richard Löwenherz" ['Großer Taten tat der Ritter fern im heiligen Lande viel'] for voice and piano (1826?, 1st version)
- Op. 86 – D 907, Song "Romanze des Richard Löwenherz" ['Großer Taten tat der Ritter fern im heiligen Lande viel'] for voice and piano (1826?, 2nd version)
- Op. 96 No. 2 – D 909, Song "Jägers Liebeslied" ['Ich schieß' den Hirsch im grünen Forst'] for voice and piano (1827)
- D 910, Song "Schiffers Scheidelied" ['Die Wogen am Gestade schwellen'] for voice and piano (1827)
- D 916A, Song ["?"] ['?'] for voice and piano "Liedentwurf in C" (1827?, sketch without text)
- Op. posth. 115 No. 1 – D 917, Song "Das Lied im Grünen" ['Ins Grüne, ins Grüne, da lockt uns der Frühling'] for voice and piano (1827)
- D 919, Song "Frühlingslied" ['Geöffnet sind des Winters Riegel'] for voice and piano (1827?, 2nd setting)
- D 922, Song "Heimliches Lieben" ['O du, wenn deine Lippen mich berühren'] for voice and piano (1827, 1st version)
- Op. 106 No. 1 – D 922, Song "Heimliches Lieben" ['O du, wenn deine Lippen mich berühren'] for voice and piano (1827, 2nd version)
- Op. posth. 165 No. 5 – D 923, Song "Eine altschottische Ballade" ['Dein Schwert, wie ist's von Blut so rot'] for male voice, female voice and piano, Edward (1827, 1st version)
- D 923, Song "Eine altschottische Ballade" ['Dein Schwert, wie ist's von Blut so rot'] for voice and piano, Edward (1827; 2nd version in addition to 3rd version for male voice, female voice and piano)
- Op. 106 No. 2 – D 926, Song "Das Weinen" ['Gar tröstlich kommt geronnen'] for voice and piano (1827–1828)
- Op. 106 No. 3 – D 927, Song "Vor meiner Wiege" ['Das also, das ist der enge Schrein'] for voice and piano (1827–1828)
- D 931, Song "Der Wallensteiner Lanzknecht beim Trunk" ['He! schenket mir im Helme ein!'] for voice and piano (1827)
- D 932, Song "Der Kreuzzug" ['Ein Münich steht in seiner Zell'] for voice and piano (1827)
- D 933, Song "Des Fischers Liebesglück" ['Dort blinket durch Weiden'] for voice and piano (1827)
- D 937, Song "Lebensmut" ['Fröhlicher Lebensmut braust in dem raschen Blut'] for voice and piano (1828?, fragment)
- D 938, Song "Der Winterabend" ['Es ist so still, so heimlich um mich'] for voice and piano (1828)
- Op. 96 No. 1 – D 939, Song "Die Sterne" ['Wie blitzen die Sterne so hell durch die Nacht'] for voice and piano (1828)
- D 945, Song "Herbst" ['Es rauschen die Winde so herbstlich und kalt'] for voice and piano (1828)
- Op. 97 – D 955, Song "Glaube, Hoffnung und Liebe" ['Glaube, hoffe, liebe!'] for voice and piano (1828)
- D 965A, Song "Die Taubenpost" ['Ich hab' eine Brieftaub in meinem Sold'] for voice and piano [formerly D 957 No. 14] (1828)
- D 990, Song "Der Graf von Habsburg" ['Zu Aachen in seiner Kaiserpracht'] for voice and piano (date unknown)
- D 990A, Song "Kaiser Maximilian auf der Martinswand" ['Hinauf! hinauf! in Sprung und Lauf'] for voice and piano (date unknown, also appears as "Kaiser Maximilian auf der Martinswand in Tirol")
- D 990B, Song "Augenblicke im Elysium" ['Vor der in Ehrfurcht all mein Wesen kniet'] for voice and piano [formerly D 582] (date unknown, lost)
- Op. posth. 130 – D 990C, Song "Das Echo" ['Herzliebe gute Mutter, o grolle nicht mit mir'] for voice and piano [formerly D 868] (1828?)
- D 990D, Song "Die Schiffende" ['Sie wankt dahin; die Abendwinde spielen'] for voice and piano (1815?, lost)
- D deest, Song "?" ['?'] improvised for a play for voice and piano (1815?, lost?; possibly identical to D 284)
- D deest, Song "?" ['?'] in C major for voice and piano (1816, fragment)
- D deest, Song "Winterlied" ['Das Glas gefüllt!'] for voice and piano, Winterabend (after 1820; 2nd setting of D 242, with a different title; also appears unofficially listed as D 242A or D 324A)
- D deest, Song "?" ['?'] for voice and piano (c. 1827, fragment; lost)

== Series V: Orchestral works ==
=== Symphonies ===
- D 2B, Symphony in D major [formerly D 997] (1811?, fragment of the first movement is extant)
- D 82, Symphony No. 1 in D major (1813)
- D 125, Symphony No. 2 in B♭ major (1814–1815)
- D 200, Symphony No. 3 in D major (1815)
- D 417, Symphony No. 4 in C minor, Tragic (1816)
- D 485, Symphony No. 5 in B♭ major (1816)
- D 589, Symphony No. 6 in C major, Little C major (1817–1818)
- D 615, Sketch of a Symphony in D major (1818, piano sketches of two movements are extant)
- D 708A, Sketch of a Symphony in D major (after 1820, piano sketches of all four movements are extant)
- D 729, Symphony (No. 7) in E major (1821, sketches of all four movements are extant)
- D 759, Symphony (No. 8) in B minor, Unfinished (1822, unfinished – two complete movements and a fragment of a "Scherzo" third movement are extant; the "Entre-Acte nach dem I. Aufzug", D 797 No. 1 is possibly the fourth movement)
- D 936A, Sketch of a Symphony (No. 10) in D major (1828?, piano sketches of all three movements are extant)
- D 944, Symphony (No. 9) in C major, Great C major (1825? and 1828, identical to the so-called "Gmunden-Gastein" Symphony, D 849)

=== Overtures ===
- D 2A, Overture in D major for orchestra [formerly D 996] (1811?, fragment)
- D 2G, Overture in D major for orchestra (1810 or 1811?, fragment)
- D 4, Overture in D major to the vocal comedy Der Teufel als Hydraulicus for orchestra (1812?)
- D 12, Overture in D major for orchestra (1811)
- D 14, Overture in an unknown key for orchestra (c. 1812, piano sketch; lost)
- D 26, Overture in D major for orchestra (1812)
- D 470, Overture in B♭ major for orchestra (1816, belongs to D 472?; 2 versions; fragment of a version for string quartet was formerly D 601)
- D 556, Overture in D major for orchestra (1817)
- D 590, Overture in D major for orchestra, in the Italian Style (1817)
- D 591, Overture in C major for orchestra, in the Italian Style (1817, first published as Op. posth. 170)
- D 648, Overture in E minor for orchestra (1819)
- D deest, Overture in an unknown key for orchestra (date unknown, lost)

=== Miscellaneous orchestral works ===
- D 39A, Three Minuets with Trios for orchestra (1813, lost)
- D 71C, Fragment of an orchestral piece in D major [formerly D 966A] (1813)
- D 74A, Fragment of an orchestral piece in D major (1813?)
- D 94A, Fragment of an orchestral piece in B♭ major (1814; discarded overture for Act III of "Des Teufels Lustschloß")
- D 966B, Sketch of an orchestral piece in A major (after 1819)

=== Concertante works ===
- D 345, Concerto in D major for violin and orchestra "Konzertstück" (1816, concert piece in one movement)
- D 438, Rondo in A major for violin and string orchestra (1816)
- D 580, Polonaise in B♭ major for violin and orchestra (1817)

== Series VI: Chamber music ==
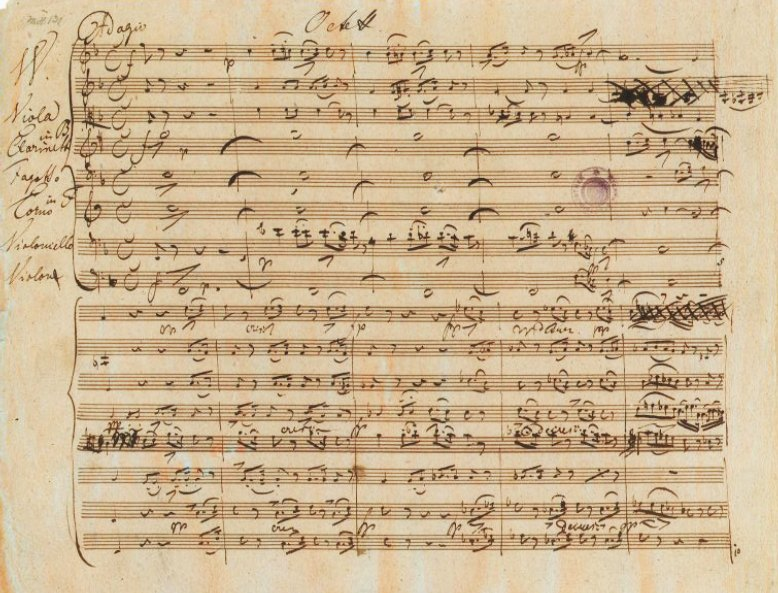
Schubert's autograph of the Octet in F major, D 803

=== Works for nonet and octet ensembles ===
- D 72, Wind Octet in F major for two oboes, two clarinets, two horns and two bassoons (1813, unfinished – a completed "Minuet" and "Finale", as well as a fragment of an "Allegro" movement are extant)
- D 79, Wind Nonet "Franz Schuberts Begräbniß-Feyer" in E♭ minor for two clarinets, two bassoons, contrabassoon, two horns and two trombones, Eine kleine Trauermusik (1813)
- D 803, Octet in F major for two violins, viola, violoncello, double bass, clarinet, horn and bassoon (1824, first published as Op. posth. 166)

=== Works for string sextet and quintet ===
- D 8, Overture in C minor for string quintet (1811; scored for two violins, two violas and violoncello)
- D 956, String Quintet in C major (1828; scored for two violins, viola and two violoncellos; first published as Op. posth. 163)
- D deest, String Sextet in an unknown key for three violins, viola, violoncello and double bass (date unknown, fragment; lost)

=== Works for string quartet ===
- D 2C, Movement in D minor/F major for string quartet [formerly D 998] (1811?, fragment)
- D 3, Movement in C major for string quartet (1811 or 1812?, fragment; version for string quartet of D 29)
- D 8A, Overture in C minor for string quartet (after 1811, version for string quartet of D 8)
- D 18, String Quartet No. 1, String Quartet in G minor/B♭ major (1810 or 1811)
- D 19, String Quartet in (an) unknown key(s) (1810 or 1811, lost)
- D 19A, String Quartet in (an) unknown key(s) (1810 or 1811, lost)
- D 20, Overture in B♭ major for string quartet (1812, lost)
- D 32, String Quartet No. 2, String Quartet in C major (1812)
- D 36, String Quartet No. 3, String Quartet in B♭ major (1813)
- D 46, String Quartet No. 4, String Quartet in C major (1813)
- D 68, String Quartet No. 5, String Quartet in B♭ major (1813, two "Allegro" movements are extant; middle movements are lost?)
- D 74, String Quartet No. 6, String Quartet in D major (1813)
- D 86, Minuet in D major for string quartet (1813?)
- D 87, String Quartet No. 10, String Quartet in E♭ major (1813, first published as Op. posth. 125 No. 1)
- D 87A, Fragment of a vocal or instrumental movement in C major for string quartet (?) (1813, fragment; also appears as "Andante in C major")
- D 89, Five Minuets with Six Trios, Five German Dances with Seven Trios and One Coda for string quartet (1813, 2 versions of Minuet No. 3 and German Dance with Trio No. 5)
- D 90, Five German Dances with Seven Trios and One Coda for string quartet (1813, belong to D 89)
- D 94, String Quartet No. 7, String Quartet in D major (1811 or 1812)
- D 103, Quartettsatz (D 103), String Quartet in C minor, (1814, fragment of the first movement is extant)
- D 112, String Quartet No. 8, String Quartet in B♭ major (1814, first published as Op. posth. 168)
- D 173, String Quartet No. 9, String Quartet in G minor (1815)
- D 353, String Quartet No. 11, String Quartet in E major (1816, first published as Op. posth. 125 No. 2)
- D 703, String Quartet No. 12, Quartettsatz (D 703) in C minor (1820; unfinished – a complete first movement, known as Quartettsatz, and a fragment of the second movement are extant)
- D 804, String Quartet No. 13, String Quartet in A minor, Rosamunde (1824, first published as Op. 29)
- D 810, String Quartet No. 14, String Quartet in D minor, Death and the Maiden (1824)
- D 887, String Quartet No. 15, String Quartet in G major, (1826, first published as Op. posth. 161)
- D Anh. I,1, String Quartet in E♭ major [formerly D 40] (1813, lost or identical to D 87)
- D Anh. I,2, String Quartet in F major (1816, lost or identical to D 353 or D 487)
- D deest, Fantasy in an unknown key for string quartet (1813, lost)
- D deest, String Quartet in B♭ major (1816, lost)

=== Works for string trio ===
- D 111A, String Trio in B♭ major (1814, fragment of an "Allegro" movement is extant)
- D 471, String Trio in B♭ major (1816, unfinished – complete first movement and fragment of second movement are extant)
- D 581, String Trio in B♭ major (1817, 2 versions)

=== Works for piano and one or more instruments ===
- D 28, Trio in B♭ major for violin, violoncello and piano, Sonatensatz (1812; an "Allegro" movement is extant)
- D 384, Sonata in D major for violin and piano (1816, 2 versions of the first movement are extant; first published as Op. posth. 137 No. 1)
- D 385, Sonata in A minor for violin and piano (1816, first published as Op. posth. 137 No. 2)
- D 408, Sonata in G minor for violin and piano (1816, first published as Op. posth. 137 No. 3)
- D 487, Adagio e Rondo concertante in F major for violin, viola, violoncello and piano (1816)
- D 574, Sonata in A major for violin and piano, Duo (1817, first published as Op. posth. 162)
- D 667, Quintet in A major for violin, viola, violoncello, double bass and piano, Trout Quintet (1819?, first published as Op. posth. 114)
- D 802, Variations in E minor for flute and piano, Trockne Blumen (1824, 2 versions of "Variation V"; first published as Op. posth. 160)
- D 821, Sonata in A minor for arpeggione and piano (1824)
- D 895, Rondo in B minor for violin and piano, Rondeau brillant (1826, first published as Op. 70)
- D 897, Trio in E♭ major for violin, violoncello and piano, Notturno (1828?, an "Adagio" movement is extant; first published as Op. posth. 148)
- D 898, Trio (No. 1) in B♭ major for violin, violoncello and piano (1828?, first published as Op. 99)
- D 929, Trio (No. 2) in E♭ major for violin, violoncello and piano (1827, first published as Op. 100)
- D 934, Fantasy in C major for violin and piano (1827, first published as Op. posth. 159)

=== Other works for strings and wind instruments ===
- D 2D, Six Minuets for winds [formerly D 995] (1811; scored for two oboes, two clarinets, two bassoons, two horns and trombone; Nos. 1–3 are complete; Nos. 4–6 are piano sketches; version for piano is also extant for Nos. 1–2)
- D 2F, Trio of a Minuet for winds (1811, piano sketch; alternate version of the Trio for D 2D No. 4)
- D 94B, Five Minuets and Six German Dances for string quartet and two horns (1814, lost)
- D 199, Duet "Mailied" ['Grüner wird die Au']; version for two horns (1815, 2nd setting)
- D 202, Duet "Mailied" ['Der Schnee zerrinnt, der Mai beginnt']; version for two horns (1815; 2nd setting of D 130, with a different title)
- D 203, Duet "Der Morgenstern" ['Stern der Liebe']; version for two horns (1815, 2nd setting)
- D 204, Duet "Jägerlied" ['Frisch auf, ihr Jäger']; version for two horns (1815)
- D 205, Duet "Lützows wilde Jagd" ['Was glänzt dort vom Walde']; version for two horns (1815)
- D 354, Four komische Ländler in D major for two violins (1816)
- D 355, Eight Ländler in F♯ minor for violin (?) (1816, possibly for two violins)
- D 370, Nine Ländler in D major for violin (?) (1816, possibly for two violins)
- D 374, Eleven Ländler in B♭ major for violin (?) (1816?, possibly for two violins; Nos. 1–3, 5, 7 and 11 also used in the upper parts of Nos. 1–5 and 7 from the Eight Ländler in B♭ major for piano, D 378)
- D 597A, Variations in A major for violin (1817, sketch; lost)

== Series VII: Piano music ==
=== Works for two pianos, eight hands ===
- D Anh. I,7, March for two pianos, eight hands [formerly D 858] (1825, lost)

=== Works for piano duet ===
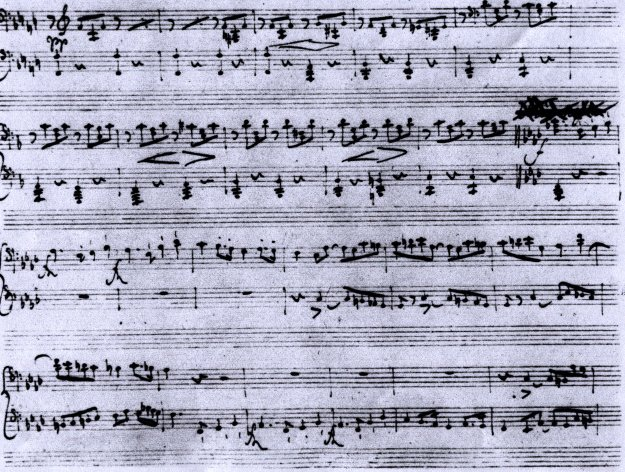
Manuscript page from Schubert's Fantasy in F minor, D 940

==== Miscellaneous piano duet works ====
- D 1, Fantasy in G major for piano duet (1810, a discarded first version of the "Finale" is also extant)
- D 1B, Fantasy in G major for piano duet (1810 or 1811, fragment)
- D 1C, Sonata in F major for piano duet (1810 or 1811, fragment of the first movement is extant)
- D 9, Fantasy in G minor for piano duet (1811)
- D 48, Fantasy in C minor for piano duet, Grande Sonate (1813, 2 versions)
- D 608, Rondo in D major for piano duet, Notre amitié est invariable (1818, 2 versions; 2nd version first published as Op. posth. 138)
- D 617, Sonata in B♭ major for piano duet (1818, first published as Op. 30)
- D 624, Eight Variations on a French Song in E minor for piano duet (1818, first published as Op. 10; 2 versions of the "Theme" are extant)
- D 812, Sonata in C major for piano duet, Grand Duo (1824, first published as Op. posth. 140)
- D 813, Eight Variations on an original theme in A♭ major for piano duet (1824, first published as Op. 35)
- D 818, Divertissement à la hongroise in G minor for piano duet (1824, first published as Op. 54)
- D 823, Divertissement sur des motifs originaux français in E minor for piano duet (pub. 1826–1827, first movement originally published as Marche Brillante, Op. 63; second and third movements first published as Andantino varié and Rondeau brillant, Op. 84 Nos. 1–2)
- D 908, Eight Variations on a theme from Hérold's Opera Marie for piano duet (1827, first published as Op. 82 No. 1)
- D 940, Fantasy in F minor for piano duet (1828, first published as Op. 103)
- D 947, Allegro in A minor for piano duet, Lebensstürme (1828, first published as Op. posth. 144)
- D 951, Rondo in A major for piano duet, Grand Rondeau (1828, first published as Op. 107)
- D 952, Fugue in E minor for organ duet or piano duet (1828, first published as Op. posth. 152)
- D 968, Allegro moderato in C major and Andante in A minor for piano duet, Sonatine (between 1815 and 1819?)
- D 968A, Introduction, Four Variations on an original theme and Finale in B♭ major for piano duet [formerly D 603] (date unknown, first published as Op. posth. 82 No. 2)

==== Marches and dances ====
- D 599, Four Polonaises for piano duet (1818, first published as Op. 75)
- D 602, Trois Marches Héroiques for piano duet (1818 or 1824, first published as Op. 27)
- D 618, German Dance in G major with Two Trios and Two Ländler in E major for piano duet (1818)
- D 618A, Polonaise in B♭ major for piano duet (1818, sketch)
- D 733, Trois Marches Militaires for piano duet (1818?, first published as Op. 51)
- D 814, Four Ländler for piano duet (1824)
- D 819, Six Grandes Marches for piano duet (1818 or 1824, first published as Op. 40)
- D 824, Six Polonaises for piano duet (1826, first published as Op. 61)
- D 859, Grande Marche Funèbre in C minor for piano duet (1825, first published as Op. 55)
- D 885, Grande Marche Héroique in A minor for piano duet (pub. 1826, first published as Op. 66)
- D 928, March in G major for piano duet, Kindermarsch (1827)
- D 968B, Deux Marches Caractéristiques in C major for piano duet [formerly D 886] (date unknown, first published as Op. posth. 121)

==== Overtures ====
- D 592, Overture in D major for piano duet, in the Italian Style (1817, version for piano duet of D 590)
- D 597, Overture in C major for piano duet, in the Italian Style (1817, version for piano duet of D 591)
- D 668, Overture in G minor for piano duet (1819)
- D 675, Overture in F major for piano duet (1819?, first published as Op. 34)
- D 773, Overture to the Opera Alfonso und Estrella for piano duet (1823, version for piano duet of the Overture from D 732; first published as Op. 69)
- D 798, Overture to the Opera Fierabras for piano duet (1823, version for piano duet of the Overture from D 796; NSA also appends a version by Carl Czerny)

=== Works for piano solo ===
==== Piano sonatas and sonata movements ====
- D 154, Piano Sonata in E major (1815, fragment of the first movement is extant; early version of the first movement of the Piano Sonata in E major, D 157)
- D 157, Piano Sonata in E major (1815, unfinished – first three movements are extant)
- D 277A, Minuet in A minor with Trio in F major for piano (1815, alternate third movement for the Piano Sonata in C major, D 279)
- D 279, Piano Sonata in C major (1815, unfinished – first three movements are extant; the Allegretto in C major, D 346 fragment is probably the fourth movement)
- D 346, Allegretto in C major for piano (1816?, fragment; perhaps the fourth movement of the Piano Sonata in C major, D 279)
- D 459, Piano Sonata in E major (1816, in 2 movements; also paired with D 459A to have a five movement sonata or five piano pieces "Fünf Klavierstücke")
- D 459A, Three piano pieces "Drei Klavierstücke" (1816?, also paired with D 459 to have a five movement sonata or five piano pieces "Fünf Klavierstücke")
- D 505, Adagio in D♭ major for piano (1818?, probably the second movement of the unfinished Piano Sonata in F minor, D 625; first published in E major in an abridged form as Op. posth. 145 No. 1)
- D 506, Rondo in E major for piano (1817?, perhaps the fourth movement of the unfinished? Piano Sonata in E minor, D 566; first published as Op. posth. 145 No. 2)
- D 537, Piano Sonata in A minor (1817, first published as Op. posth. 164)
- D 557, Piano Sonata in A♭ major (1817)
- D 566, Piano Sonata in E minor (1817, unfinished? – first three movements are extant; the Rondo in E major, D 506 may be the fourth movement)
- D 568, Piano Sonata in D♭ major/E♭ major (1817, 2 versions; 2nd version first published as Op. posth. 122; 1st version [formerly D 567] in D♭ major; in D 567 there is no "Menuetto" third movement and the last movement is a fragment; NSA also appends an amended first movement from the 1st version)
- D 570, Scherzo in D major and Allegro in F♯ minor for piano (1817?, the "Allegro" is a fragment; these were probably intended as the last two movements of the unfinished Piano Sonata in F♯ minor, D 571)
- D 571, Piano Sonata in F♯ minor (1817, unfinished – fragment of an "Allegro moderato" first movement is extant. The Andante in A major, D 604, as well as the Scherzo in D major and Allegro in F♯ minor fragment from D 570 probably constitute the remaining movements)
- D 575, Piano Sonata in B major (1817, first published as Op. posth. 147)
- D 600, Minuet in C♯ minor for piano (1814?; the Trio in E major, D 610 was probably intended for this Minuet; in turn the Minuet with Trio D 600/610 tandem possibly constitute the third movement of the unfinished Piano Sonata in C major, D 613)
- D 604, Andante in A major for piano (1816 or 1817; may be the second movement of the unfinished Piano Sonata in F♯ minor, D 571)
- D 610, Trio in E major for piano, to be regarded as the lost son of a minuet (1818, this Trio might have been intended for the Minuet in C♯ minor, D 600; in turn the Minuet with Trio D 600/610 tandem possibly constitute the third movement of the unfinished Piano Sonata in C major, D 613)
- D 612, Adagio in E major for piano (1818; perhaps the second movement of the unfinished Piano Sonata in C major, D 613)
- D 613, Piano Sonata in C major (1818, unfinished – fragments of two movements are extant; the Adagio in E major, D 612 as well as the Minuet with Trio D 600/610 possibly constitute the remaining movements)
- D 625, Piano Sonata in F minor (1818, unfinished – a completed Scherzo with Trio, and fragments of two "Allegro" movements are extant; the Adagio in D♭ major D 505 is probably the second movement)
- D 655, Piano Sonata in C♯ minor (1819; fragment of an "Allegro" is extant)
- D 664, Piano Sonata in A major (1819 or 1825; first published as Op. posth. 120)
- D 769A, Piano Sonata in E minor [formerly D 994] (c. 1823, unfinished – fragment of an "Allegro" first movement is extant)
- D 784, Piano Sonata in A minor (1823, first published as Op. posth. 143)
- D 840, Piano Sonata in C major, Reliquie (1825, unfinished – first and second movements are complete; third and fourth movements are fragments)
- D 845, Piano Sonata in A minor (1825, first published as Op. 42)
- D 850, Piano Sonata in D major, Gasteiner (1825, first published as Op. 53)
- D 894, Piano Sonata in G major, Fantasie (1826, first published as Op. 78; NSA also appends a discarded 1st version of the second movement)
- D 958, Piano Sonata in C minor (1828)
- D 959, Piano Sonata in A major (1828)
- D 960, Piano Sonata in B♭ major (1828)
- D Anh. I,8, Piano Sonata in F major (1815, lost or identical to D 157)
- D Anh. I,9, Piano Sonata in F major (1816, lost or identical to D 459)
- D deest, Piano Sonata in C♯ major (1825?, lost or identical to D 568 1st version)

==== Miscellaneous piano works ====
- D 2E, Fantasy in C minor for piano [formerly D 993] (1811)
- D 13, Fugue in D minor for piano (c. 1812, presumably for piano)
- D 21, Six Variations in E♭ major for piano (1812, lost)
- D 24, Seven Variations in F major for piano (1812?, fragment; lost)
- D 24A, Fugue in C major for piano or organ (1812?)
- D 24B, Fugue in G major for piano or organ (1812?)
- D 24C, Fugue in D minor for piano or organ (1812?)
- D 24D, Fugue in C major for piano (1812?, fragment)
- D 29, Andante in C major for piano (1812, version for piano of D 3; also used in a sketch for the second movement of D 36)
- D 41A, Fugue in E minor for piano (?) (1813, fragment)
- D 71B, Fugue in E minor for piano (1813, fragment)
- D 156, Ten Variations in F major for piano (1815, 2 versions of the "Theme" and "Variation II")
- D 178, Adagio in G major for piano (1815, 2 versions; 2nd version is a fragment)
- D 309A, Rondo in C major for piano (1815, fragment)
- D 347, Allegro moderato in C major for piano (1813?, fragment)
- D 348, Andantino in C major for Piano (1816?, fragment)
- D 349, Adagio in C major for piano (1816?, fragment)
- D 576, 13 Variations on a theme by Anselm Hüttenbrenner in A minor for piano (1817)
- D 593, Two Scherzi for piano (1817)
- D 605, Fantasy in C major for piano (1821–1823, fragment)
- D 605A, Fantasy in C major for piano, Grazer Fantasy (1818?)
- D 606, March in E major for piano (1818?)
- D 718, Variation in C minor on a Waltz by Anton Diabelli for piano (1821, written for Vaterländischer Künstlerverein)
- D 757A, March in B minor for piano (1822)
- D 759A, Overture to the Opera Alfonso und Estrella for piano (1822, version for piano of the Overture from D 732; first published as Op. 69)
- D 760, Fantasy in C major for piano, Wanderer Fantasy (1822, first published as Op. 15)
- D 780, Six Moments musicaux for piano (pub. 1828, first published as Op. 94), in C major, A♭ major, F minor, C♯ minor, F minor, and A♭ major.
- D 817, Ungarische Melodie in B minor for piano (1824)
- D 899, Four Impromptus for piano (1827, first published as Op. 90) in C minor, E♭ major, G♭ major, and A♭ major
- D 900, Allegretto in C minor for piano (after 1820?, fragment)
- D 915, Allegretto in C minor for piano (1827)
- D 916B, Piano piece in C major (1827?, sketch)
- D 916C, Piano piece in C minor (1827?, sketch)
- D 935, Four Impromptus for piano (1827, first published as Op. posth. 142) in F minor, A♭ major, B♭ major, and F minor.
- D 946, Three piano pieces "Drei Klavierstücke" (1828)
- D Anh. I,10, Fantasy in E♭ major for piano (1825?, lost)
- D deest, Fugue in an unknown key for piano or organ (1813, lost)
- D deest, Fugue in F major for piano (1813, sketch)

==== Piano dances ====
- D 2D, Six Minuets for winds [formerly D 995] (1811; version for piano of Nos. 1–2)
- D 19B, Several Waltzes and a March for piano (1812 or 1813, lost)
- D 22, Twelve Minuets with Trios for piano (1812, lost)
- D 41, Thirty Minuets with Trios for piano (1813; Nos. 1–8, 11–18 and 20–23 are extant)
- D 91, Two Minuets, each with Two Trios for piano (1813)
- D 128, Twelve Viennese German Dances for piano (1812?)
- D 135, German Dance with Trio in E major for piano (1815; 1st version of the Waltz in E major, D 146 No. 3, with a different title)
- D 139, German Dance in C♯ major with Trio in A major for piano (1815)
- D 145, Twelve Waltzes, Seventeen Ländler and Nine Écossaises for piano (1815–1821, first published as Op. 18)
- D 146, Twenty Waltzes for piano, Letzte Walzer (1815 and 1823, first published as Op. posth. 127; 2 versions for No. 3 – the 1st one with a Trio in E major [D 135], and the 2nd one with a Trio in A major; also, 2 versions for No. 5 – the 1st one with a Trio in B♭ major and the 2nd one with a Trio in A♭ major; NSA identifies both earlier versions as "German Dances", not "Waltzes")
- D 158, Écossaise in D minor/F major for piano (1815)
- D 299, Twelve Écossaises for piano (1815)
- D 334, Minuet in A major with Trio in E major for piano (1815)
- D 335, Minuet in E major with Two Trios for piano (1813?)
- D 365, Thirty-six Original Dances for piano, Erste Walzer (1818–1821, first published as Op. 9)
- D 366, Seventeen Ländler for piano (1824)
- D 378, Eight Ländler in B♭ major for piano (1816; the upper parts of Nos. 1–5 and 7 also used in Nos. 1–3, 5, 7 and 11 from the Eleven Ländler in B♭ major for violin, D 374)
- D 380, Three Minuets, each with Two Trios for piano (1816, fragment; for the third minuet, part of the first trio and the entire second trio are missing)
- D 420, Twelve German Dances for piano (1816)
- D 421, Six Écossaises for piano (1816)
- D 511, Écossaise in E♭ major for piano (c. 1817)
- D 529, Eight Écossaises for piano (1817)
- D 643, German Dance in C♯ minor and Écossaise in D♭ major for piano (1819)
- D 681, Twelve Ländler for piano (c. 1815, Nos. 5–12 are extant)
- D 697, Six Écossaises in A♭ major for piano (1820, Nos. 1–4 and 6 are extant)
- D 722, German Dance in G♭ major for piano (1821)
- D 734, Sixteen Ländler and Two Écossaises for piano, Wiener Damen-Ländler (pub. 1826, first published as Op. 67)
- D 735, Galop and Eight Écossaises for piano (pub. 1825, first published as Op. 49)
- D 769, Two German Dances for piano (1823–1824)
- D 779, Thirty-four Valses Sentimentales for piano (pub. 1825, first published as Op. 50)
- D 781, Twelve Écossaises for piano (1823, Nos. 2–12 are extant)
- D 782, Écossaise in D major for piano (pub. 1824)
- D 783, Sixteen German Dances and Two Écossaises for piano (1823–1824; German Dances Nos. 8 and 9 also used in D 366, D 814; first published as Op. 33)
- D 790, Twelve German Dances for piano (1823, also appear as "Twelve Ländler"; first published as Op. posth. 171)
- D 816, Three Écossaises for piano (1824)
- D 820, Six German Dances for piano (1824)
- D 841, Two German Dances for piano (1825)
- D 844, Waltz in G major for piano, Albumblatt (1825)
- D 924, Twelve Grazer Waltzes for piano (1827?, first published as Op. 91)
- D 925, Grazer Galopp in C major for piano (1827?)
- D 944A, German Dance in an unknown key for piano (1828, lost)
- D 969, Twelve Waltzes for piano, Valses nobles (pub. 1827, first published as Op. 77)
- D 970, Six Ländler for piano (date unknown, also appear as "Six German Dances")
- D 971, Three German Dances for piano (1823?)
- D 972, Three German Dances for piano (before 1817)
- D 973, Three German Dances for piano (1823?)
- D 974, Two German Dances for piano (1822?)
- D 975, German Dance in D major for piano (1824?)
- D 976, Cotillon in E♭ major for piano (pub. 1825)
- D 977, Eight Écossaises for piano (1816?)
- D 978, Waltz in A♭ major for piano (pub. 1825)
- D 979, Waltz in G major for piano (pub. 1826)
- D 980, Two Waltzes for piano (pub. 1826)
- D 980A, Two Dances for piano [formerly D 640] (before 1821, sketches)
- D 980B, Two Ländler in E♭ major for piano [formerly D 679] (1816?)
- D 980C, Two Ländler in D♭ major for piano [formerly D 680] (before 1821, fragment)
- D 980D, Waltz in C major for piano, Krähwinkler Tanz (pub. 1828)
- D 980E, Two Dances for piano (?) (after 1818, sketches)
- D 980F, March in G major for piano (date unknown; piano reduction of a lost march for orchestra?)
- D Anh. I,13, Six German Dances for piano (1814, lost)
- D deest, Themes to Two Minuets for piano (1813?, sketches)
- D deest, Four Dances in A major for piano (1816?, only incipits are extant)
- D deest, Ecossaise in G major, Ländler in F major and Ländler in F minor (?) for piano (1818, sketches)

== Series VIII: Supplement ==
=== Arrangements ===
- D Anh. II,1, Arrangement of the Overture to the Opera Iphigenie in Aulis for piano duet (1810?, fragment; composition by Christoph Willibald Gluck)
- D Anh. II,2, Arrangement of the "Notturno in G major for Flute, Viola and Guitar" for flute, guitar, viola and violoncello [formerly D 96] (1814, also appears as "Quartet in G major for flute, guitar, viola and violoncello"; composition by Wenzel Thomas Matiegka, Op. 21; Trio II in the second movement “Menuetto”, by Schubert)
- D Anh. II,3, Arrangement of Two Arias from the Opera Echo et Narcisse ['Rien de la nature'; 'O combats, o désordre extrème!'] for voice and piano (1816, compositions by Christoph Willibald Gluck)
- D Anh. II,4, Arrangement of the Hymn "Der 8. Psalm für Solostimme und Klavier" ['Unendlicher, Gott, unser Herr'] for voice, two oboes, two clarinets, timpani, strings and organ (1823, composition by Maximilian Stadler; instrumentation by Schubert)

=== Other works ===
- D Anh. I,3, Fugue in C major for string quartet (?) (1812?, fragment; only viola part is extant)
- D Anh. I,12, Seven Easy Variations in G major for piano (pub. 1810, presumably not by Schubert)
- D Anh. I,14, Waltz [in G♭ major] for piano, Kupelwieser-Walzer (1826, transcribed by Richard Strauss)
- D Anh. I,15, Minuet with Trio in D major for piano [formerly D 336] (date unknown, presumably not by Schubert)
- D Anh. I,17, Hymn "Tantum ergo" ['Tantum ergo'] in B♭ major for unknown voice(s)/instrument(s) (date unknown, fragment; only one soprano part is extant; presumably not by Schubert)
- D Anh. I,25, Cantata "Drum Schwester und Brüder" ['Drum Schwester und Brüder singt fröhliche Lieder'] for voice (?), choir, violin, violoncello and other unknown instruments (1819, fragment; only violin and violoncello parts are extant)
- D Anh. I,26, Trio or Quartet "Sturmbeschwörung" ['Nirgends Rettung, nirgends Land'] for two sopranos and alto (?) or two sopranos and two altos (?) (date unknown, fragment; only one soprano part is extant)
- D Anh. I,28, Song "Klage (Nimmer länger trag ich)" ['Nimmer länger trag ich dieser Leiden Last'] for voice and piano, Nimmer länger trag ich [formerly D 512] (c. 1817, presumably not by Schubert)
- D Anh. I,29, Song " Kaiser Ferdinand II." ['Was reget die Stadt sich in freudiger Hast?'] for voice and piano (1809?, doubtful)
- D deest, Trio "Scherz-Terzett" ['Mala musica, bona musica?'] for three altos (1812, doubtful)
- D deest, Song "Die Nacht" ['Die Nacht bricht an, mit leisen Lüften sinket'] for voice and guitar (?) (after 1816?, doubtful; accompaniment part by Franz Xaver Baron von Schlechta; voice part by Schubert?)
- D deest, Song (?) "Seliges Genügen" ['?'] for unspecified voice(s)/instrument(s) (date unknown, lost)

=== Composition exercises ===
- D 16, Counterpoint exercises for unspecified instruments/voices (1823?, seven exercises in double counterpoint; piano sketches)
- D 17, Composition exercises on "Quell' innocente figlio" ['Quell' innocente figlio'] for various vocal ensembles, Arie dell' Angelo (1812?, also appears as "Aria dell' Angelo"; 9 settings; No. 1 Solo for soprano; No. 2 Duo for two sopranos; No. 3 Trio for soprano, alto and tenor; No. 4 Quartet for soprano, alto, tenor and bass; No. 5 Trio for soprano, alto and tenor; No. 6 Trio for soprano, alto and tenor; No. 7 Quartet for soprano, alto, tenor and bass; No. 8 Quartet for soprano, alto, tenor and bass; No. 9 Quartet for soprano, alto, tenor and bass)
- D 25, Counterpoint and imitation exercises for unspecified instruments/voices (1812; four 2-part and three 3-part counterpoint exercises, in addition to four 2-part imitation exercises)
- D 25A, Counterpoint exercises for unspecified instruments/voices (1812?, two 4-part counterpoint exercises)
- D 25B, Counterpoint exercises for unspecified instruments/voices (1812?, fifteen 3-part counterpoint exercises)
- D 25C, Fugue in F major for two voices (1812?, fragment)
- D 33, Composition exercises on "Entra l'uomo allor che nasce" ['Entra l'uomo allor che nasce'] for various vocal ensembles, Aria di Abramo (1812, also appears as "Aria di Abramo"; 6 settings; No. 1 for soprano; No. 2 Duo for soprano and alto; No. 3 Trio for soprano, alto and tenor; No. 4 Quartet for soprano, alto, tenor and bass; No. 5 Quartet for soprano, alto, tenor and bass; No. 6 Quartet for soprano, alto, tenor and bass)
- D 34, Composition exercises on "Te solo adoro" ['Te solo adoro'] for soprano, alto, tenor and bass (1812, 2 settings; 2nd setting is a fragment)
- D 35, Composition exercises on "Serbate, o Dei custodi" ['Serbate, o Dei custodi'] for various vocal ensembles (1812, 3 settings; No. 1 Quartet for soprano, alto tenor and bass; No. 2 Choir for mixed voices; No. 3 Solo for tenor)
- D 37A, Four fugal sketches for unspecified instruments "Vier Fugentwürfe" [formerly D 967] (1813?, piano sketches; the Deutsch catalogue and the NSA incorrectly identify this as a work for piano)
- D 619, Vocal exercises for two voices and figured bass "Singübungen" (1818, figured bass usually realized for piano)
- D 965B, Fugal exercises for unspecified instruments/voices "Fugenübungen" (1828; eighteen fugal expositions for two voices)
- D Anh. I,32, Composition exercises "Generalbaßübungen" for unspecified instruments/voices [formerly D 598A] (date unknown)
- D deest, Canon ["?"] ['?'] in C major for five voices (1826?)
- D deest, Imitation exercises in invertible counterpoint for unspecified instruments/voices (1828, sketches; three 2-part imitation exercises)

=== Works, fragments and sketches of unknown genre ===
- D 988A, Accompaniment part in B♭ major for piano (after 1820, fragment; for a multi-part vocal composition?)
- D deest, Sketch of a composition "?" ['?'] for unspecified voices and orchestra (1811?, sketch)
- D deest, Aria "?" ['?'] for bass and piano (?) (1812, sketch; also appears as "Allegretto in D major")
- D deest, Theme of a dance composition (?) for piano (?) (1812?, sketch)
- D deest, Fragment of a composition for violin (?) (1813, sketch; fragment)
- D deest, Fragment of an instrumental composition for violin, viola and guitar (?) (1813?, fragment)
- D deest, Sketch of a composition for unspecified instrument(s) (1813, sketch)
- D deest, Piano piece (?) in F major (1813, sketch)
- D deest, Vocal composition "?" ['?'] for mixed choir (?) (1818?, fragment without text)
- D deest, Sketch of a theme for unspecified instruments/voices "Themenentwurf" (1818, sketch)
- D deest, Sketch of a theme in A minor for unspecified instruments/voices "Themenentwurf" (1818, sketch)
- D deest, Vocal composition "?" ['?'] for unspecified voices (1821?, fragment)
- D deest, Accompaniment for a vocal composition "?" ['?'] (1821?, fragment)
- D deest, Sketch of a composition for orchestra (?) (1823, piano sketch)
- D deest, Fragment of a composition for unspecified instruments (1823, sketch)
- D deest, Fragment of a cantata (?) "?" ['?'] for unspecified soloists, choir and orchestra (date unknown, fragment without text)
- D deest, Song (?) "...doch stärker ist die Mutterliebe" ['?'] for voice (?) and orchestra (date unknown, fragment; lost)
- D deest, Song (?) or piano piece (?) "Lieder für das Pianoforte" ['?'] for voice (?) and/or piano (?) (date unknown, lost)

=== Works in the catalogue by other composers ===
- D Anh. I,4, String Quartet in G major [formerly D 2] (fragment of one movement is extant; composition by Albert Stadler)
- D Anh. I,5, String Quartet in E♭ major (date unknown, sketch of the first movement is extant; composition by Anselm Hüttenbrenner)
- D Anh. I,6, Duet in D major for two violins (1816, not by Schubert)
- D Anh. I,6A, Symphony in E major, Symphony 1825 (date unknown, not by Schubert; composition by Gunter Elsholz)
- D Anh. I,11, Allegro in G major and Minuet in C major for piano (date unknown, also appears as "Sonatina"; not by Schubert)
- D Anh. I,16, Dance "Écossaise de Vienne" in A♭ major for piano (1821?, composition by Anselm Hüttenbrenner?)
- D Anh. I,27, Song "Drei Chöre mit Bläsern" ['Lieblich ist, wenn sanftes Grau; Leb wohl, geliebte Freundin; O Zeit, wie manchen herben Schmerz'] for male choir, two horns and two bassoons (date unknown, fragment; not by Schubert)
- D Anh. I,30, Song "Mein Frieden" ['Ferne, ferne flammen helle Sterne'] for voice and piano (pub. 1823, composition by Franz Anton Schubert)
- D Anh. I,31, Song "Adieu! (Lebe wohl!)" ['Voici l'instant suprême; Schon naht, um uns zu scheiden'] for voice and piano (pub. 1824, composition by August Heinrich von Weyrauch)
- D Anh. III,1, Nine Canons "Neun Kanons" ['Es packe dich das Glück beim Kragen; Vom Glück sei alles dir beschert; Glück fehl dir vor allem; Wohlsein und Freude; Drum habe Dank, o Vater Hayden; Adam hat siebn Söhn; Cato, Plato, Cicero; Was i beim Tag mit der Leiern gwinn; Alleluia'] for four or more voices (c. 1810 copy; compositions by Michael Haydn, Joseph Haydn, Josef Otter, Wolfgang Amadeus Mozart and anonymous composers)
- D Anh. III,2, Song "Die Teilung der Erde" ['Nehmt hin die Welt! rief Zeus aus seinen Höhen'] for voice and piano (c. 1810 copy; composition by Franz de Paula Roser)
- D Anh. III,3, Symphony in C major, KV 551 (1813 copy; composition by Wolfgang Amadeus Mozart)
- D Anh. III,4, Canon "Kanon (Hoffnung Kind des Himmels)" ['Hoffnung Kind des Himmels'] from the Singspiel "Elbondocani" for two sopranos, tenor, bass and piano (1813? copy; composition by Johann Rudolf Zumsteeg)
- D Anh. III,5, Trio "Chor der Derwische" ['Ein Gott, ein wahrer Gott ist nur'] for two tenors and bass (1813? copy; composition by Johann Rudolf Zumsteeg)
- D Anh. III,6, Offertory "Clamavi ad te" in C major, Op. 16 [formerly D 85] for unspecified voices/instruments (1813 copy of the solo soprano voice is extant; composition by Josef Preindl)
- D Anh. III,7, Scene "Monolog aus Goethes Iphigenie" ['Heraus in eure Schatten'] for voice, women's choir and piano ['Heraus in eure Schatten'] (1815 copy; composition by Johann Friedrich Reichardt)
- D Anh. III,8, Symphony No. 4 in B♭ major, Op. 60 (8-bar copy after 1820; composition by Ludwig van Beethoven)
- D Anh. III,9, Song "Deutsches Hochamt (Hier liegt vor deiner Majestät)" ['?'] for voice and organ (copy of the organ part lost; composition by Michael Haydn)
- D Anh. III,10, Mass in C major (1820 copy; composition by Josef Preindl)
- D Anh. III,11, Canon "Laß immer in der Jugend Glanz" ['Laß immer in der Jugend Glanz'], KV 484d, for two voices [formerly D 92] (copy lost; composition by Wolfgang Amadeus Mozart)
- D Anh. III,12, Canon "Selig alle, die im Herrn entschliefen" ['Selig alle, die im Herrn entschliefen'], KV 382b, for two voices [formerly D 127] (copy lost; composition by Wolfgang Amadeus Mozart)
- D Anh. III,13, Song "Abendlied unterm gestirnten Himmel" ['Wenn die Sonne niedersinket'], WoO 150, for voice and piano (1820 copy; composition by Ludwig van Beethoven)

== Sources ==
- Composer: Franz Peter Schubert (1797–1828) at The LiederNet Archive
- Franz Schubert's Works (various editors and editions)
- Schubert-online (manuscripts, first and early editions) by Austrian Academy of Sciences (ÖAW)
- Schubert Thematic Catalogue (various editions), including:
  - (in German) Franz Schubert, Thematisches Verzeichnis seiner Werke in chronologischer Folge on-line copy of the 1978 version of the Deutsch catalogue at archive.org
- Neue Schubert-Ausgabe (various editors and publication dates):
  - Franz Schubert (1797–1828): New Edition of the Complete Works at www.baerenreiter.com
  - The New Schubert Edition at schubert-ausgabe.de
- Eva Badura-Skoda and Peter Branscombe. Schubert Studies: Problems of Style and Chronology. Cambridge University Press, 1982. Reprint 2008. ISBN 0521088720, 9780521088725, 9780521226066
- Brian Newbould. Schubert: The Music and the Man. University of California Press, 1999. ISBN 0520219570, 9780520219571
- Reinhard Van Hoorickx. "Franz Schubert (1797–1828) List of the Dances in Chronological Order" in Revue belge de Musicologie/Belgisch Tijdschrift voor Muziekwetenschap, Vol. 25, No. 1/4, pp. 68–97, 1971
- Reinhard Van Hoorickx. "Thematic Catalogue of Schubert's Works: New Additions, Corrections and Notes" in Revue belge de Musicologie/Belgisch Tijdschrift voor Muziekwetenschap, Vol. 28/30, pp. 136–171, 1974–1976.
