= List of compositions by Franz Schubert (1823) =

Franz Schubert's compositions of 1823 are mostly in the Deutsch catalogue (D) range D 768–798, and include:

- Instrumental works:
  - Piano Sonata in E minor, D 769A
  - Piano Sonata in A minor, D 784
  - Moments musicaux, D 780 (composition dates however uncertain)
  - Valses Sentimentales, D 779 (not necessarily all composed in 1823)
- Vocal music:
  - Die Verschworenen, D 787 (completed in 1823)
  - Fierabras, D 796
  - Rosamunde, D 797
  - Die schöne Müllerin, D 795
  - "Auf dem Wasser zu singen", D 774
  - "Du bist die Ruh", D 776
  - "Lachen und Weinen", D 777

== Table ==
=== Legend ===
Legend to the table
column		content
1	D '51	Deutsch number in the first version of the Deutsch catalogue (1951)
2	D utd	most recent (utd = up to date) Deutsch catalogue number; the basic collation of the list is according to these numbers – whether or not the possibility to adjust the sorting according to the content of other columns is available depends on the device with which the table is displayed.
3	Op. pbl	Opus number (Op.; p indicates Post. = posthumous) and date of first publication (pbl; between brackets; when there is more than one date the earlier dates indicate partial publications). The column sorts to Opus number, then (earliest of) the publication date(s)
4	AGA	Alte Gesamt-Ausgabe = Franz Schubert's Werke: Kritisch durchgesehene Gesammtausgabe. Indicates genre/instrumentation: Series I: Symphonien (Nos. 1-8) (Johannes Brahms, 1884); Series II: Overtüren und Andere Orchesterwerke (Johann Nepomuk Fuchs, 1886); Series III: Oktette (Nos. 1-3) and IV: Streichquintett (Eusebius Mandyczewski, 1889); Series V: Streichquartette (Nos. 1-15) (Joseph Hellmesberger and Eusebius Mandyczewski, 1890); Series VI: Trio für Streichinstrumente (Eusebius Mandyczewski, 1892); Series VII: Trios, Quartets and Quintets with Piano and VIII: Pianoforte und Ein Instrument (Ignaz Brüll, 1886); Series IX: Pianoforte zu vier Händen (Anton Door, 1888); Series X: Sonaten für Pianoforte (Julius Epstein, 1888); Series XI: Fantasie, Impromptus und andere Stücke für Pianoforte (Julius Epstein, 1888); Series XII: Tänze für Pianoforte (Nos. 1-31) (Julius Epstein, 1889); Series XIII: Messen (Nos. 1-7) (Eusebius Mandyczewski, 1887); Series XIV: Kleinere Kirchenmusikwerke (Nos. 1-22) (Eusebius Mandyczewski, 1888); Series XV: Dramatische Musik (Johann Nepomuk Fuchs, 1893); Series XVI: Werke für Männerchor (Nos. 1-46) (Eusebius Mandyczewski, 1891); Series XVII: Werke für gemischten Chor (Nos. 1-19) (Josef Gänsbacher, Eusebius Mandyczewski, 1892); Series XVIII: Werke für Drei und mehr Frauenstimmen mit Pianoforte-Begleitung (Nos. 1-6) (Josef Gänsbacher, Eusebius Mandyczewski, 1891); Series XIX: Kleine Gesangswerke (Nos. 1-36) (Josef Gänsbacher and Eusebius Mandyczewski, 1892); Series XX: Sämtliche einstimmige Lieder und Gesänge (Eusebius Mandyczewski, 1894-1895); Series XXI: Supplement (Eusebius Mandyczewski, 1897); 1. Instrumentalmusik No. 1-5; 2. Instrumentalmusik No. 6-13; 3. Instrumentalmusik No. 14-; 4. Gesangsmusik; Series XXII: Revisionsbericht
5	NSA	NGA/NSA/NSE = New Schubert Edition, also indicates genre/instrumentation: Series I: Church Music; Series II: Stage Works; Series III: Part Songs; Series IV: Lieder; Series V: Orchestral Works; Series VI: Chamber Music; 1. Octet and Nonet; 2. String Quintet; 3. String Quartets I; 4. String Quartets II; 5. String Quartets III; 6. String Trios; 7. Works for Piano and several instruments; 8. Works for Piano and one instrument; 9. Dances for several instruments; Series VII: Piano Music; 1. Works for Piano Four Hands; 2. Works for Piano Two Hands; Series VIII: Supplement, 2. Schubert's Studies
6	Name	unique name, with, if available, a link to the relevant encyclopedia article; sorts by name with initial definite ("Der", "Die", "Das", ...) or indefinite ("Ein", "A", ...) articles, and numbers, moved after the expression they qualify: e.g. "Die Hoffnung, ..." sorts as "Hoffnung, Die, ..." – "Thirty Minuets ..." sorts as "Minuets, 30, ...".
7	Key / incipit	incipit mostly for songs (linking to lyrics and their translation, for instance at The LiederNet Archive, when available), other compositions by key, except for Schubert's stage works: type of composition in brackets.
8	Date	(presumed) date of composition, or, for copies and arrangements, date of Schubert's autograph. Sorts to earliest possible date of completion, unlike the chronology of the Deutsch catalogue that generally collates according to earliest date associated with the composition: e.g. Schubert started the composition of his 3rd String Quartet on 19 November 1812 and completed it on 21 February 1813 – in the Deutsch catalogue the composition is grouped with other compositions from 1812: when using the sort function of the 8th column the composition is grouped with compositions completed in 1813
9	Additional info	may include: Information about the text (lyrics, libretto) of vocal compositions: e.g., "Text by [text author]", "Text: [standard lyrics]", "... from [literary work]"; "other settings: D ..." indicates Schubert's other settings of the same text; for fields starting with "Text ..." this column sorts by text author (last name, first name—or pen name when such name is more established), then incipit of the lyrics (alternatively, when the incipit is rarely used, title of the work); Information about the authenticity of the composition: the work is without doubt Schubert's unless when marked as "Doubtful", "Spurious?" or "Spurious" (in the last case columns 3–8 give no further information about the composition); Forces needed for performance ("For ..."): may be omitted when the type of composition makes the instrumentation clear (e.g. String Quartet → two violins, viola and cello), and, for vocal music, when the setting is for voice and piano; "s", "a", "t" and "b" refer to a single soprano, alto, tenor and bass singer respectively, while "S", "A", "T" and "B" to choral parts for the same types of singers (see SATB).; Specifications regarding movements (e.g. "Allegro – Minuet – Rondo") or sections (e.g. "No. 1 ..."); Information about the completeness of the extant work: the work is considered complete as extant unless when marked "Sketch", "Incomplete", "Unfinished", "Fragment" or "Lost"; Information about versions (e.g. "Two versions: ...")

=== List ===
Compositions by Franz Schubert listed in the Deutsch catalogue for 1823
D '51	D utd	Op. pbl	AGA	NSA	Name	Key / incipit	Date	Additional info
768	768	96,3 (1827)	XX, 7 No. 420	IV, 5	Wandrers Nachtlied, D 768	Über allen Gipfeln ist Ruh	before July 1824	Text by Goethe; Publ. as Op. 96 No. 3 in 1828
769	769	(1823) (1889)	XII; No. 18	VII/2, 6 & 7a	Two German Dances, D 769	Various keys	before 19/12/1823 –Jan. 1824	For piano; No. 2 publ. in 1823
994	769A			VII/2, 2	Piano Sonata, D 769a	E minor	c. 1823	Allegro; Fragment
770	770	71 (1823)	XX, 7 No. 424	IV, 3	Drang in die Ferne	Vater, du glaubst es nicht	early 1823	Text by Leitner; Publ. as Op. 71 in 1827
771	771	22,1 (1823)	XX, 7 No. 425	IV, 1a	Der Zwerg	Im trüben Licht verschwinden schon die Berge	1822?	Text by Collin, M. C.
772	772	22,2 (1823)	XX, 7 No. 426	IV, 1a	Wehmut, D 772	Wenn ich durch Wald und Fluren geh'	1822 or 1823?	Text by Collin, M. C.
773	773	69 (1826)		VII/1, 5 No. 5	Overture to Alfonso und Estrella, D 773		1823	For piano duet; Arranged from D 732 (see also: D 759A); Publ. as Op. 69 in 1830
774	774	72 (1823)	XX, 7 No. 428	IV, 3	Auf dem Wasser zu singen	Mitten im Schimmer der spiegelnden Wellen	1823	Text by Stolberg-Stolberg; Publ. as Op. 72 in 1827
775	775	59,2 (1826)	XX, 8 No. 453	IV, 3	Daß sie hier gewesen	Daß der Ostwind Düfte hauchet	1823?	Text by Rückert
776	776	59,3 (1826)	XX, 8 No. 454	IV, 3	Du bist die Ruh	Du bist die Ruh, der Friede mild	1823	Text by Rückert
777	777	59,4 (1826)	XX, 8 No. 455	IV, 3	Lachen und Weinen	Lachen und Weinen zu jeglicher Stunde	1823?	Text by Rückert
778	778	60,1 (1826)	XX, 8 No. 456	IV, 3	Greisengesang	Der Frost hat mir bereifet	before June 1823	Text by Rückert; For b and piano; Two versions; 2nd, in AGA, is Op. 60 No. 1
	778A	(1969)		IV, 13	Die Wallfahrt	Meine Tränen im Bußgewand	1823?	Text by Rückert; For b and piano
	778B			VIII, 3	Ich hab' in mich gesogen	Ich hab' in mich gesogen den Frühling treu und lieb	1823?	Text by Rückert; Sketch; For ttbb
779	779	50 (1825)	XII; No. 4 & Anh.	VII/2, 6 & 7a	34 Valses sentimentales	Various keys	Feb. 1823 –before 21/11/1825	For piano; Early versions of Nos. 1, 2, 4, 8, 9, 12, 14 and 33 in AGA Anh.
780	780	94 (1823) (1824) (1828)	XI No. 4	VII/2, 5	Six Moments musicaux	Various keys	before Dec. 1823 –before 11/7/1828	For piano; No. 3 publ. in 1823; No. 6 publ. in 1824; Publ. as Op. 94 in 1828
781	781	(1824) (1825) (1889)	XII; No. 25 & No. 3	VII/2, 6 & 7a	Twelve Écossaises, D 781	Various keys	January; 1823	For piano; No. 1 (=Écossaise No. 2 of D 783 and AGA XII No. 3) publ. in 1825; Nos. 4 and 7 publ. in 1824
782	782	(1824)		VII/2, 7a	Écossaise, D 782	D major	before 21/2/1824	For piano
783	783	33 (1825)	XII; No. 3	VII/2, 6 & 7a	Sixteen German Dances and Two Écossaises	Various keys	Jan. 1823 –before 8/1/1825	For piano; Related to other dances, e.g. D 790 No. 2, D 781 No. 1
784	784	143p (1839)	X No. 8	VII/2, 2 No. 12	Piano Sonata, D 784	A minor	February; 1823	Allegro giusto – Andante – Allegro vivace
785	785	(1831)	XX, 7 No. 421	IV, 13	Der zürnende Barde	Wer wagt's, wer wagt's	February; 1823	Text by Bruchmann; For b and piano
786	786	123p (1830)	XX, 7 No. 423	IV, 13	Viola	Schneeglöcklein, o Schneeglöcklein	March 1823	Text by Schober
787	787	(1889) (1964)	XV, 3 No. 6	II, 7	Die Verschworenen, a.k.a. Der haüsliche Krieg	(Singspiel in one act)	completed April 1823	Text by Castelli; For ssss(s)aatt(t)bbSATB and orchestra; Overture (fragment publ. in 1964) – Nos. 1–11
788	788	(1838)	XX, 7 No. 427	IV, 13	Lied, D 788, a.k.a. Die Mutter Erde	Des Lebens Tag ist schwer und schwül	April 1823	Text by Stolberg-Stolberg
789	789	(1832)	XX, 7 No. 429	IV, 13	Pilgerweise	Ich bin ein Waller auf der Erde	April 1823	Text by Schober
790	790	171p (1864)	XII; No. 9	VII/2, 6	Twelve German Dances, D 790, a.k.a. Twelve Ländler	Various keys	May 1823	For piano; No. 2 = D 783 No. 1; No. 8 similar to D. 783 No. 1
791	791	(1867)		II, 16	Rüdiger	(Opera)	May 1823	Text by Mosel?; For ttTTBB and orchestra; Sketches of two numbers
792	792	(1833)	XX, 7 No. 430	IV, 13	Vergißmeinnicht	Als der Frühling	May 1823	Text by Schober
793	793	173p,2 (1867)	XX, 7 No. 431	IV, 13	Das Geheimnis, D 793	Sie konnte mir kein Wörtchen sagen	May 1823	Text by Schiller (other setting: D 250)
794	794	37,1 (1825) (1909)	XX, 7 No. 432	IV, 2a & b No. 6	Der Pilgrim	Noch in meines Lebens Lenze	May 1823	Text by Schiller; Two versions (merged into one in AGA): 1st is fragment – 2nd is Op. 37 No. 1
795	795	25 (1824)	XX, 7 Nos. 433– 452	IV, 2a & Anh. No. 2–5	Die schöne Müllerin (1. Das Wandern – 2. Wohin? – 3. Halt! – 4. Danksagung an den Bach – 5. Am Feierabend – 6. Der Neugierige – 7. Ungeduld – 8. Morgengruß – 9. Des Müllers Blumen – 10. Tränenregen – 11. Mein! – 12. Pause – 13. Mit dem grünen Lautenbande – 14. Der Jäger – 15. Eifersucht und Stolz – 16. Die liebe Farbe – 17. Die böse Farbe – 18. Trockne Blumen – 19. Der Müller und der Bach – 20. Des Baches Wiegenlied)	1. Das Wandern ist des Müllers Lust – 2. Ich hört' ein Bächlein rauschen – 3. Eine Mühle seh' ich blinken – 4. War es also gemeint – 5. Hätt' ich tausend Arme zu rühren – 6. Ich frage keine Blume – 7. Ich schnitt' es gern in alle Rinden ein – 8. Guten Morgen, schöne Müllerin – 9. Am Bach viel kleine Blumen stehn' – 10. Wir saßen so traulich beisammen – 11. Bächlein, laß dein Rauschen sein – 12. Meine Laute hab' ich gehängt an die Wand – 13. Schad' um das schöne grüne Band – 14. Was sucht denn der Jäger – 15. Wohin so schnell – 16. In Grün will ich mich kleiden – 17. Ich möchte zieh'n in die Welt hinaus – 18. Ihr Blümlein alle – 19. Wo ein treues Herze – 20. Gute Ruh', gute Ruh'	October?– November; 1823	Text by Müller, W.
796; 333	796	76 (1827) (1840) (1867) (1872) (1886)	XV, 6 No. 10	II, 8a–c	Fierabras, also spelled Fierrabras	(Opera in three acts); Vocal numbers include 5. Laß uns mutvoll hoffen and 6b. Was quälst du mich, o Mißgeschick	25/5/1823– 2/10/1823	Text by Kupelwieser; Music for three sopranos, three tenors, three basses, baritone, SATB and orchestra; Overture (Schubert's piano duet version is D 798, Czerny's piano duet version publ. in 1827 as Schubert's Op. 76, orchestral score publ. in 1867) – Act I: Nos. 1–6 – Act II: Nos. 7–17 (No. 7 reuses music of D 982 No. 3, No. 15 reuses music of D 326 No. 14) – Act III: Nos. 18–23 (No. 21 publ. with piano reduction in 1840, last part of No. 21 was D 333, No. 22 publ. with piano reduction in 1872)
797	797	26 (1824) (1828) (1866) (1867) (1891)	XV, 4 No. 8	II, 9 III, 2b Anh. No. 6–7; III, 3 No. 31; IV, 2a	Rosamunde, Fürstin von Zypern (1. Entre'acte I – 2. Ballet I – 3a. Entre'acte II – 3b. Romanze a.k.a. Ariette – 4. Geisterchor – 5. Entre'acte III – 6. Hirtenmelodien – 7. Hirtenchor – 8. Jagerchor – 9. Ballet II)	(Incidental music for a play in three acts); Vocal numbers: 3b. Der Vollmond strahlt auf Bergeshöhn – 4. In der Tiefe wohnt das Licht – 7. Hier auf den Fluren – 8. Wie lebt sich's so fröhlich im Grünen	autumn 1823	Text by Chézy; For aSATB and orchestra; (Overture: see D 644 and 732) – Nos. 1–9 (Nos. 1 and 5 publ. in 1866, Nos. 2 and 9 publ. in 1867, No. 3b publ. with piano reduction as Op. 26 in 1824, Nos. 4, 7 and 8 publ. with piano reduction in 1828 or 1834, No. 4 publ. 1828; No. 5 partly reused in D 935 No. 3 and Andante of D 804)
798	798	(1897)	XXI, 2 No. 7	VII/1, 5 No. 6	Overture to Fierabras		after 2/10/1823	Arrangement for piano duet of D 796's overture

== Sources ==
Multi-volume editions, websites and catalogues

- Alte Gesamt-Ausgabe (AGA) = Franz Schubert's Works: Schubert, Franz (1884–1897). Johannes Brahms; Ignaz Brüll; Anton Door; Julius Epstein; Johann Nepomuk Fuchs; Josef Gänsbacher; Joseph Hellmesberger Sr.; Eusebius Mandyczewski (eds.). Franz Schubert's Werke: Kritisch durchgesehene Gesammtausgabe (in German). Leipzig: Breitkopf & Härtel. Reprints of several volumes by Kalmus and Dover Publications; Franz Schubert's Werke (Series I–XIX and XXI), Series XX, Revisionsbericht: Scores at the International Music Score Library Project
- Deutsch catalogue (D) = Schubert Thematic Catalogue:
  - Deutsch, Otto Erich; et al. (Donald R. Wakeling) (1951). Schubert: Thematic Catalogue of all his Works in Chronological Order (1st ed.). London: Dent. 1995 reprint, with errata correction: Deutsch, Otto Erich; et al. (Donald R. Wakeling) (1995). The Schubert Thematic Catalogue (Dover ed.). Mineola, N.Y.: Dover Publications. ISBN 0486286851.
  - Deutsch, Otto Erich (1978). Walther Dürr; Arnold Feil; Christa Landon [in German]; Werner Aderhold (eds.). Franz Schubert: Thematisches Verzeichnis seiner Werke in chronologischer Folge. New Schubert Edition (in German). Kassel: Bärenreiter. ISBN 9783761805718. ISMN 9790006305148.
    - Series VIII (Supplement)
    - Volume 4
- Hoboken catalogue (Hob.): "Joseph Haydn (1732–1809): Werke sortiert nach Hob (Hoboken-Verzeichnis, 1957-78)" (in German). Kaiserslautern: Klassika.
- Köchel catalogue (K.): "Wolfgang Amadeus Mozart (1756–1791): Werke sortiert nach KV^{6} (Köchel-Verzeichnis, 6. Auflage, 1964)" (in German). Kaiserslautern: Klassika.
- Neue Schubert-Ausgabe (NSA) = New Schubert Edition:
  - NSA scores: Schubert, Franz (1968–2019). International Schubert Association (Tübingen) (ed.). Franz Schubert (1797–1828): New Edition of the Complete Works (in German). Kassel: Bärenreiter. [over 80 volumes in eight series] Individual volumes:
    - NSA II, 15: Schubert, Franz; Neumann, Johann Philipp (2008). Jahrmärker, Manuela; Aigner, Thomas (eds.). Sacontala. New Schubert Edition (in German). Kassel: Bärenreiter. ISMN 9790006497294.
      - Series II (Stage Works), Vol. 15
    - NSA VIII, 4: See above Deutsch (1978)
  - NSA website: "New Schubert Edition". Tübingen: International Schubert Association.
- Schubert Online: "www.schubert-online.at: Schubert music manuscripts, first and early editions online". Vienna: Austrian Academy of Sciences (ÖAW).
- The LiederNet Archive: Ezust, Emily; et al. (LiederNet contributors). "Composer: Franz Peter Schubert (1797 - 1828)". Ontario: LiederNet Corporation.

Other

- Badura-Skoda, Eva; Branscombe, Peter, eds. (2008). Schubert Studies: Problems of Style and Chronology. Cambridge University Press. ISBN 0521088720.
  - Walther Dürr "Schubert's Songs and Their Poetry" pp. 1–24
  - Rufus Hallmark "Schubert's 'Auf dem Strom'" pp. 25–46
  - Elaine Brody "Schubert and Sulzer Revisited" pp. 47–60
  - Marius Flothuis "Schubert Revises Schubert" pp. 61–84
  - Elizabeth Norman McKay "Schubert as Composer of Operas" pp. 85–104
  - Peter Branscombe "Schubert and the Melodrama" pp. 105–142
  - Christoph Wolff "Schubert's 'Der Tod und dad Mädchen'" pp. 143–172
  - Peter Gülke on String Quintet D 956 pp. 173–186
  - Paul Badura-Skoda on Schubert's 'Great' C major Symphony pp. 187–208
  - Robert Winter "Paper Studies and the Future of Schubert Research" pp. 209–276
  - Eva Badura-Skoda "The Chronology of Schubert's Piano Trios" pp. 277–296
  - Reinhard Van Hoorickx "The Chronology of Schubert's Fragments and Sketches" pp. 297–326
  - Arnold Feil "Rhythm in Schubert" pp. 327–346
  - Alexander Weinmann on Leopold Puschl and Schubert's sojourn in Zseliz pp. 347–356
- Elsholz, Gunter (1982). Vogel, Reimut (ed.). Franz Schubert: Sinfonie in E-Dur 1825. Stuttgart: Goldoni. ISBN 3922044050. OCLC 987719669.
- Hilmar, Ernst; Jestremski, Margret, eds. (2004). Schubert-Enzyklopädie (in German). Vol. 1. Introduction by Alfred Brendel. Tutzing: Hans Schneider. ISBN 3795211557.
- Keefe, Simon P., ed. (2006). Mozart Studies. Cambridge University Press. ISBN 0521851025.
- Kube, Michael (2009). "Franz Schuberts Deutsche Trauermesse (D 621) als Problem der Text- und Stilkritik". In Mitterauer, Gertraud; Müller, Ulrich; Springeth, Margarete; Vitzthum, Verena (eds.). Was ist Textkritik?: Zur Geschichte und Relevanz eines Zentralbegriffs der Editionswissenschaft (in German). Walter de Gruyter. pp. 129–140. ISBN 3484970782.
- Mozart, Wolfgang Amadeus; Haydn, Joseph; Haydn, Michael (2008). Kircher, Armin (ed.). Chorbuch Mozart • Haydn VII: Kanonsammlung [Choral Collection Mozart • Haydn, Vol. VII: Canon Collection] (in German, Latin, English, and Italian). Stuttgart: Carus-Verlag. OCLC 274222567.
- Newbould, Brian (1999). Schubert: The Music and the Man. University of California Press. ISBN 0520219570.
- Reed, John (1997). The Schubert Song Companion. Manchester University Press. ISBN 1901341003.
- Van Hoorickx, Reinhard (1971). "Franz Schubert (1797–1828) List of the Dances in Chronological Order". Revue belge de Musicologie / Belgisch Tijdschrift voor Muziekwetenschap. 25 (1). Belgian Musicological Society: 68–97. doi:10.2307/3686180. ISSN 0771-6788. JSTOR 3686180.
- Van Hoorickx, Reinhard (1974–1976). "Thematic Catalogue of Schubert's Works: New Additions, Corrections and Notes". Revue belge de Musicologie / Belgisch Tijdschrift voor Muziekwetenschap. 28–30. Belgian Musicological Society: 136–171. doi:10.2307/3686053. ISSN 0771-6788. JSTOR 3686053.
