= Schubert opus/Deutsch number concordance =

Franz Schubert (31 January 1797 – 19 November 1828) was an Austrian composer.

This is a concordance of those compositions by Schubert that were given opus numbers, and their corresponding Deutsch catalogue numbers.

== Background ==
Only a small minority of Schubert's works were published in his lifetime. Not all published works were allocated opus numbers, and the sequence of opus numbers that were allocated bore little relationship to the order in which the works were either composed or published. For example, the first of his works to be published, the song "Die Forelle", was given the opus number 32.

After Schubert's death in 1828, a number of his works were published with posthumous opus numbers. This practice was discontinued after the publication of Op. 173, in 1867.

Otto Erich Deutsch (1883–1967) was an Austrian musicologist. He is known for compiling the first comprehensive catalogue of Schubert's works: Schubert: Thematic Catalogue of all his Works in Chronological Order. This was first published in English in 1951, and subsequently revised for a new edition in German, in 1978.

== Concordance ==
The table includes the following information:

- Opus Number – the opus number of the original publication of the work, when applicable; "(p)" or "posth." indicates a posthumous publication
- D – the catalogue number assigned by Otto Erich Deutsch
- Date of composition – the known or assumed date of composition, when available
- Date of publication – the first date of publication of the work
- Title – The title of the work in an English translation from German
- Incipit – the first line(s) of text, as pertaining to vocal works
- Scoring – the instrumentation and/or vocal forces required for the work
- Informal title – any additional names by which the work is known, when applicable
- Version – the number of versions as it pertains to works that have more than one version of the same setting
- Setting – the order of setting as it pertains to vocal works that have numerous settings of the same text
- Former Deutsch Number – information on Deutsch numbers that have been reassigned, when applicable
- Notes – any additional information concerning the work: alternate titles, completeness, relation to other works, authorship, etc.

Opus No.	D No.	Comp.	Pub.	Title	Notes
1	328	1815	1821	Song "Erlkönig" ['Wer reitet so spät durch Nacht und Wind?'] for voice and piano (4th version)	
2	118	1814	1821	Song "Gretchen am Spinnrade" ['Meine Ruh' ist hin, mein Herz ist schwer'] for voice and piano	
3/1	121	1814	1821	Song "Schäfers Klagelied" ['Da droben auf jenem Berge'] for voice and piano (1st version)	
3/2	216	1815	1821	Song "Meeres Stille" ['Tiefe Stille herrscht im Wasser'] for voice and piano (2nd setting)	
3/3	257	1815	1821	Song "Heidenröslein" ['Sah ein Knab' ein Röslein stehn'] for voice and piano	
3/4	368	1816?	1821	Song "Jägers Abendlied" ['Im Felde schleich' ich still und wild'] for voice and piano (2nd setting)	
4/1	489	1816	1821	Song "Der Wanderer" ['Ich komme vom Gebirge her'] for voice and piano, Der Unglückliche (3rd version)	formerly D 493
4/2	685	1820	1821	Song "Morgenlied" ['Eh' die Sonne früh aufersteht'] for voice and piano	
4/3	224	1815	1821	Song "Wandrers Nachtlied" ['Der du von dem Himmel bist'] for voice and piano	
5/1	138	1815	1821	Song "Rastlose Liebe" ['Dem Schnee, dem Regen, dem Wind entgegen'] for voice and piano (1st version)	
5/2	162	1815	1821	Song "Nähe des Geliebten" ['Ich denke dein, wenn mir der Sonne Schimmer'] for voice and piano (2nd version)	
5/3	225	1815	1821	Song "Der Fischer" ['Das Wasser rauscht', das Wasser schwoll'] for voice and piano (2nd version)	
5/4	226	1815	1821	Song "Erster Verlust" ['Ach, wer bringt die schönen Tage'] for voice and piano	
5/5	367	1816	1821	Song "Der König in Thule" ['Es war ein König in Thule'] for voice and piano	
6/1	541	1817	1821	Song "Memnon" ['Den Tag hindurch nur einmal mag ich sprechen'] for voice and piano	
6/2	542	1817	1821	Duet "Antigone und Oedip" ['Ihr hohen Himmlischen'] for two voices and piano	
6/3	504	1816	1821	Song "Am Grabe Anselmos" ['Daß ich dich verloren habe'] for voice and piano (1st version)	
7/1	514	1817?	1821	Song "Die abgeblühte Linde" ['Wirst du halten, was du schwurst'] for voice and piano	
7/2	515	1817?	1821	Song "Der Flug der Zeit" ['Es floh die Zeit im Wirbelfluge'] for voice and piano	
7/3	531	1817	1821	Song "Der Tod und das Mädchen" ['Vorüber, ach vorüber'] for voice and piano	
8/1	702	1820	1822	Song "Der Jüngling auf dem Hügel" ['Ein Jüngling auf dem Hügel'] for voice and piano	
8/2	516	1816?	1822	Song "Sehnsucht" ['Der Lerche wolkennahe Lieder'] for voice and piano	
8/3	586	1817	1822	Song "Erlafsee" ['Mir ist so wohl, so weh' '] for voice and piano	
8/4	539	1817	1822	Song "Am Strome" ['Ist mir's doch, als sei mein Leben'] for voice and piano	
9	365	1818–1821	1821	Thirty-six Original Dances for piano, Erste Walzer	
10	624	1818	1822	Eight Variations on a French Song in E minor for piano duet	2 versions of the "Theme" are extant
11/1	598	1818	1822	Quartet "Das Dörfchen" ['Ich rühme mir mein Dörfchen hier'] for two tenors, two basses and piano (2nd version)	formerly D 641
11/2	724	1821 or earlier	1822	Quartet "Die Nachtigall" ['Bescheiden verborgen im buschigten Gang'] for two tenors, two basses and piano	
11/3	747	1822	1822	Quartet "Geist der Liebe" ['Der Abend schleiert Flur und Hain'] for two tenors, two basses and piano (2nd setting)	
12	478	1822 (No. 2), 1822? (Nos. 1 and 3)	1822	Song cycle Gesänge des Harfners aus "Wilhelm Meister" for voice and piano: 1. "Wer sich der Einsamkeit ergibt", Harfenspieler I (2nd setting, 2nd version); 2. "Wer nie sein Brot mit Tränen aß", Harfenspieler III [formerly D 480] (3rd setting); 3. "An die Türen will ich schleichen", Harfenspieler II [formerly D 479] (2nd version)	
13/1	517	1817	1822	Song "Der Schäfer und der Reiter" ['Ein Schäfer saß im Grünen'] for voice and piano (2nd version)	
13/2	711	1818?	1822	Song "Lob der Tränen" ['Laue Lüfte, Blumendüfte'] for voice and piano (2nd version)	
13/3	524	1817	1822	Song "Der Alpenjäger" ['Auf hohen Bergesrücken'] for voice and piano (3rd version)	
14/1	720	1821	1822	Song "Suleika I" ['Was bedeutet die Bewegung?'] for voice and piano (2nd version)	
14/2	719	1821	1822	Song "Geheimes" ['Über meines Liebchens Äugeln'] for voice and piano	
15	760	1822	1823	Fantasy in C major for piano, Wanderer Fantasy	
16/1	740	1822	1823	Quartet "Frühlingsgesang" ['Schmücket die Locken'] for two tenors, two basses and piano (2nd setting)	
16/2	422	1822?	1823	Quartet "Naturgenuß" ['Im Abendschimmer wallt der Quell'] for two tenors, two basses and piano (2nd setting)	
17/1	983	1822?	1823	Quartet "Jünglingswonne" ['So lang im deutschen Eichentale'] for two tenors and two basses	
17/2	983A	1822?	1823	Quartet "Liebe" ['Liebe rauscht der Silberbach'] for two tenors and two basses	
17/3	983B	1822?	1823	Quartet "Zum Rundetanz" ['Auf! es dunkelt; silbern funkelt'] for two tenors and two basses	
17/4	983C	1822?	1823	Quartet "Die Nacht" ['Wie schön bist du, freundliche Stille'] for two tenors and two basses	
18	145	1815–1821	1823	Twelve Waltzes, Seventeen Ländler and Nine Écossaises for piano	D 145/7 = D 970/2; D 145/30 = D 299/1; D 145/34 = D 421/1; D 145/35 = D 697/5
19/1	369	1816	1825	Song "An Schwager Kronos" ['Spute dich, Kronos!'] for voice and piano	
19/2	161	1815	1825	Song "An Mignon" ['Über Tal und Fluß getragen'] for voice and piano (2nd version)	
19/3	544	1817	1825	Song "Ganymed" ['Wie im Morgenglanze'] for voice and piano	
20/1	741	1821–1822	1823	Song "Sei mir gegrüßt" ['O du Entriß'ne mir'] for voice and piano	
20/2	686	1820	1823	Song "Frühlingsglaube" ['Die linden Lüfte sind erwacht'] for voice and piano (3rd version)	
20/3	552	1817	1823	Song "Hänflings Liebeswerbung" ['Ahidi! ich liebe'] for voice and piano (2nd version)	
21/1	553	1817	1823	Song "Auf der Donau" ['Auf der Wellen Spiegel'] for bass and piano	
21/2	536	1817?	1823	Song "Der Schiffer" ['Im winde, im Sturme'] for bass and piano (2nd version)	
21/3	525	1817	1823	Song "Wie Ulfru fischt" ['Der Angel zuckt, die Rute bebt'] for bass and piano (2nd version)	
22/1	771	1822?	1823	Song "Der Zwerg" ['Im trüben Licht verschwinden schon die Berge'] for voice and piano	
22/2	772	1822 or 1823?	1823	Song "Wehmut" ['Wenn ich durch Wald und Fluren geh' '] for voice and piano	
23/1	751	1822	1823	Song "Die Liebe hat gelogen" ['Die Liebe hat gelogen, die Sorge lastet schwer'] for voice and piano	
23/2	743	1822?	1823	Song "Selige Welt" ['Ich treibe auf des Lebens Meer'] for bass and piano	
23/3	744	1822?	1823	Song "Schwanengesang" ['Wie klag' ich's aus das Sterbegefühl'] for voice and piano	
23/4	761	1822	1823	Song "Schatzgräbers Begehr" ['In tiefster Erde ruht ein alt Gesetz'] for voice and piano	
24/1	583	1817	1823	Song "Gruppe aus dem Tartarus" ['Horch, wie Murmeln des empörten Meeres'] for voice and piano (2nd setting)	
24/2	527	1817	1823	Song "Schlaflied" ['Es mahnt der Wald'] for voice and piano, Abendlied or Schlummerlied (2nd version)	
25	795	1823	1824	Song cycle Die schöne Müllerin for voice and piano: 1. "Das Wandern" ['Das Wandern ist des Müllers Lust']; 2. "Wohin?" ['Ich hört' ein Bächlein rauschen']; 3. "Halt!" ['Eine Mühle seh' ich blinken']; 4. "Danksagung an den Bach" ['War es also gemeint']; 5. "Am Feierabend" ['Hätt' ich tausend Arme zu rühren']; 6. "Der Neugierige" ['Ich frage keine Blume']; 7. "Ungeduld" ['Ich schnitt' es gern in alle Rinden ein']; 8. "Morgengruß" ['Guten Morgen, schöne Müllerin']; 9. "Des Müllers Blumen" ['Am Bach viel kleine Blumen stehn' ']; 10. "Tränenregen" ['Wir saßen so traulich beisammen']; 11. "Mein!" ['Bächlein, laß dein Rauschen sein']; 12. "Pause" ['Meine Laute hab' ich gehängt an die Wand']; 13. "Mit dem grünen Lautenbande" ['Schad' um das schöne grüne Band']; 14. "Der Jäger" ['Was sucht denn der Jäger']; 15. "Eifersucht und Stolz" ['Wohin so schnell']; 16. "Die liebe Farbe" ['In Grün will ich mich kleiden']; 17. "Die böse Farbe" ['Ich möchte zieh'n in die Welt hinaus']; 18. "Trockne Blumen" ['Ihr Blümlein alle']; 19. "Der Müller und der Bach" ['Wo ein treues Herze']; 20. "Des Baches Wiegenlied" ['Gute Ruh', gute Ruh' ']	
26	797	1823	1824, 1891 (complete)	Music for play Rosamunde, Fürstin von Zypern for alto, mixed choir and orchestra; overture and nine numbers Ouvertüre (from D 644): 1. Entre-Acte nach dem I. Aufzug; 2. Ballett; 3a. Entre-Acte nach dem II. Aufzug 3b. Romanze: Der Vollmond strahlt auf Bergeshöh'n: 4. Geisterchor: In der Tiefe wohnt das Licht; 5. Entre-Acte nach dem III. Aufzug; 6. Hirtenmelodien; 7. Hirtenchor: Hier auf den Fluren; 8. Jägerchor: Wie lebt sich's so fröhlich im Grünen; 9. Ballett	
27	602	1818 or 1824	1824	Trois Marches Héroiques for piano duet	
28	809	1824	1824	Quartet "Gondelfahrer" ['Es tanzen Mond und Sterne'] for two tenors, two basses and piano (2nd setting)	
29	804	1824	1824	String Quartet in A minor, Rosamunde	
30	617	1818	1823	Sonata in B♭ major for piano duet	
31	717	1821	1825	Song "Suleika II" ['Ach um deine feuchten Schwingen'] for voice and piano	
32	550	1816–1821	1820	Song "Die Forelle" ['In einem Bächlein helle'] for voice and piano (4th version)	
33	783	1823–1824	1825	Sixteen German Dances and Two Écossaises for piano	German Dances Nos. 8 and 9 also used in D 366, D 814
34	675	1819?	1825	Overture in F major for piano duet	
35	813	1824	1825	Eight Variations on an original theme in A♭ major for piano duet	
36/1	707	1820	1825	Song "Der zürnenden Diana" ['Ja, spanne nur den Bogen'] for voice and piano (2nd version)	
36/2	672	1819	1825	Song "Nachtstück" ['Wenn über Berge sich der Nebel breitet'] for voice and piano (2nd version)	
37/1	794	1823	1825	Song "Der Pilgrim" ['Noch in meines Lebens Lenze'] for voice and piano (2nd version)	
37/2	588	1817	1825	Song "Der Alpenjäger" ['Willst du nicht das Lämmlein hüten?'] for voice and piano (2nd version)	
38	209	1815	1825	Song "Der Liedler" ['Gib, Schwester, mir die Harf herab'] for voice and piano	
39	636	1821?	1826	Song "Sehnsucht" ['Ach, aus dieses Tales Gründen'] for voice and piano (2nd setting, 3rd version)	
40	819	1818 or 1824	1825	Six Grandes Marches for piano duet	
41	800	1825	1827	Song "Der Einsame" ['Wenn meine Grillen schwirren'] for voice and piano	
42	845	1825	1826	Piano Sonata in A minor	
43/1	828	1825	1825	Song "Die junge Nonne" ['Wie braust durch die Wipfel'] for voice and piano	
43/2	827	1823	1825	Song "Nacht und Träume" ['Heil'ge Nacht, du sinkest nieder!'] for voice and piano (2nd version)	
44	457	1817	1827	Song "An die untergehende Sonne" ['Sonne, du sinkst'] for voice and piano	1816 sketch, finished 1817
45	739	1814	1825	Hymn "Tantum ergo" ['Tantum ergo'] in C major for mixed choir, orchestra and organ	
46	136	1815?	1825	Offertory "Totus in Corde" ['Totus in corde langueo'] in C major for soprano (or tenor), clarinet (or violin) concertante, orchestra and organ, Erstes Offertorium	
47	223	1815 and 1823	1825	Offertory "Salve Regina" ['Salve Regina'] in F major for soprano, orchestra and organ, Zweites Offertorium (2nd version)	
48	452	1816	1825	Mass No. 4 in C major for soprano, alto, tenor, bass, mixed choir, orchestra and organ	2nd setting of the "Benedictus" was formerly D 961
49	735	?	1825	Galop and Eight Écossaises for piano	
50	779	?	1825	Thirty-four Valses Sentimentales for piano	
51	733	1818?	1826	Trois Marches Militaires for piano duet	
52/1	837	1825	1826	Song "Ellens Gesang I" ['Raste, Krieger, Krieg ist aus'] for voice and piano	
52/2	838	1825	1826	Song "Ellens Gesang II" ['Jäger, ruhe von der Jagd!'] for voice and piano	
52/3	835	1825	1826	Quartet "Bootgesang" ['Triumph, er naht'] for two tenors, two basses and piano	
52/4	836	1825	1826	Chorus "Coronach (Totengesang der Frauen und Mädchen)" ['Er ist uns geschieden'] for women's choir and piano, Totengesang der Frauen und Mädchen	
52/5	846	1825	1826	Song "Normans Gesang" ['Die Nacht bricht bald herein'] for voice and piano	
52/6	839	1825	1826	Song "Ellens Gesang III (Hymne an die Jungfrau)" ['Ave Maria! Jungfrau mild'] for voice and piano, Ave Maria or Hymne an die Jungfrau	
52/7	843	1825	1826	Song "Lied des gefangenen Jägers" ['Mein Roß so müd'] for voice and piano	
53	850	1825	1826	Piano Sonata in D major, Gasteiner	
54	818	1824	1826	Divertissement à la hongroise in G minor for piano duet	
55	859	1825	1826	Grande Marche Funèbre in C minor for piano duet	
56/1	767	1822	1826	Song "Willkommen und Abschied" ['Es schlug mein Herz'] for voice and piano (2nd version)	
56/2	737	1822 or 1823?	1826	Song "An die Leier" ['Ich will von Atreus Söhnen'] for voice and piano	
56/3	738	1822 or 1823?	1826	Song "Im Haine" ['Sonnenstrahlen durch die Tannen'] for voice and piano	
57/1	633	1819 and 1823?	1826	Song "Der Schmetterling" ['Wie soll ich nicht tanzen'] for voice and piano	
57/2	634	1819 and 1823?	1826	Song "Die Berge" ['Sieht uns der Blick gehoben'] for voice and piano	
57/3	193	1815	1826	Song "An den Mond" ['Geuß, lieber Mond, geuß deine Silberflimmer'] for voice and piano (2nd version)	
58/1	312	1815	1826	Song "Hektors Abschied" ['Will sich Hektor ewig von mir wenden'] for voice and piano (2nd version)	
58/2	113	1814	1826	Song "An Emma" ['Weit in nebelgrauer Ferne'] for voice and piano (3rd version)	
58/3	191	1815	1826	Song "Des Mädchens Klage" ['Der Eichwald braust'] for voice and piano (2nd setting, 2nd version)	
59/1	756	1822	1826	Song "Du liebst mich nicht" ['Mein Herz ist zerrissen, du liebst mich nicht!'] for voice and piano (2nd version)	
59/2	775	1823?	1826	Song "Daß sie hier gewesen" ['Daß der Ostwind Düfte hauchet'] for voice and piano	
59/3	776	1823	1826	Song "Du bist die Ruh'" ['Du bist die Ruh', der Friede mild'] for voice and piano	
59/4	777	1823	1826	Song "Lachen und Weinen" ['Lachen und Weinen zu jeglicher Stunde'] for voice and piano	
60/1	778	1823	1826	Song "Greisengesang" ['Der Frost hat mir bereifet'] for bass and piano (3rd version)	
60/2	801	?	1826	Song "Dithyrambe" ['Nimmer, das glaub mir, erscheinen die Götter'] for bass and piano (2nd setting, 2nd version)	
61	824	1826	1826	Six Polonaises for piano duet	
62	877	1826	1827	Song cycle Gesänge aus "Wilhelm Meister": 1. "Mignon und der Harfner" ['Nur wer die Sehnsucht kennt'] for two voices and piano (5th setting)	
63	823	?	1826, 1827	Divertissement sur des motifs originaux français in E minor for piano duet	first movement originally published as Marche Brillante, Op. 63; second and third movements first published as Andantino varié and Rondeau brillant, Op. 84 Nos. 1–2
64	825	1826	1828	Quartet "Wehmut" ['Die Abendglocke tönet'] for two tenors and two basses	
64	825A	1826	1828	Quartet "Ewige Liebe" ['Ertönet, ihr Saiten, in nächtlicher Ruh'] for two tenors and two basses	
64	825B	1825	1828	Quartet "Flucht" ['In der Freie will ich leben'] for two tenors and two basses	
65/1	360	1816	1826	Song "Lied eines Schiffers an die Dioskuren" ['Dioskuren, Zwillingssterne'] for voice and piano	
65/2	649	1819	1826	Song "Der Wanderer" ['Wie deutlich des Mondes Licht'] for voice and piano (2nd version)	
65/3	753	1822	1826	Song "Heliopolis I" ['Im kalten, rauhen Norden ist Kunde mir geworden'] for voice and piano, Aus Heliopolis I or Im Hochgebirge	
66	885	1826	1826	Grande Marche Héroique in A minor for piano duet	
67	734	?	1826	Sixteen Ländler and Two Écossaises for piano, Wiener Damen-Ländler	
68	742	?	1822	Song "Der Wachtelschlag" ['Ach! mir schallt's dorten so lieblich hervor'] for voice and piano	
69	759A	1822	1839	Overture to the Opera Alfonso und Estrella for piano	version for piano of the Overture from D 732
69	773	1823	ca. 1830	Overture to the Opera Alfonso und Estrella for piano duet	version for piano duet of the Overture from D 732; first published incorrectly in 1826 as Op. 52
70	895	1826	1827	Rondo in B minor for violin and piano, Rondeau brillant	
71	770	1823	1827	Song "Drang in die Ferne" ['Vater, du glaubst es nicht'] for voice and piano	
72	774	1823	1827	Song "Auf dem Wasser zu singen" ['Mitten im Schimmer der spiegelnden Wellen'] for voice and piano	
73	745	1822	1827	Song "Die Rose" ['Es lockte schöne Wärme'] for voice and piano (1st version)	
74	37	1812	1827	Trio "Die Advokaten" ['Mein Herr, ich komm mich anzufragen'] for two tenors, bass and piano	
75	599	1818	1827	Four Polonaises for piano duet	
76	796	1823	1840, 1886 (complete)	Opera "Fierabras" for three sopranos, three tenors, three basses, baritone, one spoken role, mixed choir and orchestra; in three acts: Overture and twenty-three numbers Act 1 Ouvertüre: 1. Introduktion: Der Runde Silberfaden; 2. Duett: O mög' auf froher Hoffnung Schwingen; 3. Marsch und Chor: Zu hohen Ruhmespforten; 4. Ensemble; a. Rezitativ und Chor: Die Beute laß, o Herr b. Ensemble: Des Krieges Loos hat Euch c. Erzählung: Am Rand der Eb'ne d. Ensemble: Der Landestöcher fromme Pflichteu e. Quartett mit Chor: Dem Erfolg vertrauen: 5. Duett: Laß uns mutvoll hoffen; 6. Finale 1; a. Romanze: Der Abend sinkt auf stiller Flur b. Rezitativ und Arie: Was quälst du mich, o Mißgeschick c. Ensemble: Doch horch, was regt sich d. Terzett: Ha, hier waltet ein Verrath e. Rezitativ: Nun faßet Muth f. Rezitativ und Terzett: Wie? Emma hier? g. Quartett mit Chor: Fort zum Siegesreigen Act 2: 7. Lied mit Chor: Im jungen Morgenstrahle; 8. Rezitativ, March und Ensemble: Beschloßen ist's, ich löse seine Ketten!; Duett mit Chor: Was ist ihm geschehen?; 9. Duett: Weit über Glanz und Erdenschimmer; 10. Quintett: Verderben denn und Fluch; 11. Chor: Laßt Friede in die Hallen; 12. Terzett mit Chor: Im Tode sollt ihr büßen; 13. Arie: Die Brust, gebeugt von Sorgen; 14. Chor a capella: O theures Vaterland!; 15. Melodram; a. Melodram. Rezitativ und Ensemble: Ha, was ist das? b. Duett mit Chor: Selbst an des Grabes Rande: 16. Chor und Melodram: Der Hoffnung Strahl, den du gegeben; 17. Finale 2; a. Terzett und Chor: Uns führt der Vorsicht weise Hand b. Melodram: Schützt ihn, ihr ew'gen Mächte Act 3: 18. Chor: Bald tönet der Reigen; 19. Quartett: Bald wird es klar; 20. Terzett: Wenn hoch im Wolkensitze; 21. Arie mit Chor: Der Jammers herbe Qualen; Marcia funebre und Ensemble (the latter part of this number, "Laß dein Vertrauen nicht schwinden" was formerly D 333); 22. Chor und Ensemble: Der Rache Opfer fallen; 23. Finale 3; a. Rezitativ: Er ist mein Vater b. Ensemble: Der Sieg begleitet meine tapfern Heere c. Nun laßt des langersehnten Glücks uns freuen	also appears as "Fierrabras"
77	969	?	1827	Twelve Waltzes for piano, Valses nobles	
78	894	1826	1827	Piano Sonata in G major, Fantasie	NSA also appends a discarded 1st version of the second movement
79/1	851	1825	1827	Song "Das Heimweh" ['Ach, der Gebirgssohn'] for voice and piano (2nd version)	
79/2	852	1825	1827	Song "Die Allmacht" ['Groß ist Jehovah, der Herr'] for voice and piano (1st setting)	
80/1	870	1826	1827	Song "Der Wanderer an den Mond" ['Ich auf der Erd', am Himmel du'] for voice and piano	
80/2	871	1826	1827	Song "Das Zügenglöcklein" ['Kling die Nacht durch, klinge'] for voice and piano (2nd version)	
80/3	880	1826	1827	Song "Im Freien" ['Draußen in der weiten Nacht'] for voice and piano	
81/1	904	1827	1827	Song "Alinde" ['Die Sonne sinkt in's tiefe Meer'] for voice and piano	
81/2	905	1827	1827	Song "An die Laute" ['Leiser, leiser, kleine Laute'] for voice and piano	
81/3	903	1827	1827	Cantata "Zur guten Nacht" ['Horch auf! Es schlägt die Stunde'] for baritone, men's choir and piano	
82/1	908	1827	1827	Eight Variations on a theme from Hérold's Opera Marie for piano duet	
82/2	968A	?	1860	Introduction, Four Variations on an original theme and Finale in B♭ major for piano duet	formerly D 603
83	902	1827	1827	Three songs "Drei Gesänge" for bass and piano: 1. "L'incanto degli occhi; Die Macht der Augen" ['Da voi, cari lumi'; 'Nur euch, schöne Sterne'] (2nd setting); 2. "Il traditor deluso; Der getäuschte Verräter" ['Ahimè, io tremo!'; 'Weh mir, ich bebe!']; 3. "Il modo di prender moglie; Die Art ein Weib zu nehmen" ['Orsù! non ci pensiamo'; 'Wohlan! und ohne Zagen']	
84	823	?	1826, 1827	Divertissement sur des motifs originaux français in E minor for piano duet	first movement originally published as Marche Brillante, Op. 63; second and third movements first published as Andantino varié and Rondeau brillant, Op. 84 Nos. 1–2
85/1	830	1825?	1828	Song "Lied der Anne Lyle" ['Wärst du bei mir im Lebenstal'] for voice and piano	
85/2	831	1825	1828	Song "Gesang der Norna" ['Mich führt mein Weg wohl meilenlang'] for voice and piano	
86	907	1826?	1828	Song "Romanze des Richard Löwenherz" ['Großer Taten tat der Ritter fern im heiligen Lande viel'] for voice and piano (2nd version)	
87/1	713	1826?	1827	Song "Der Unglückliche" ['Die Nacht bricht an'] for voice and piano	
87/2	637	ca. 1819	1827	Song "Hoffnung" ['Es reden und träumen die Menschen viel'] for voice and piano (2nd setting)	
87/3	638	1819	1827	Song "Der Jüngling am Bache" ['An der Quelle saß der Knabe'] for voice and piano (3rd setting, 2nd version)	
88/1	856	1825	1827	Song "Abendlied für die Entfernte" ['Hinaus mein Blick, hinaus ins Tal'] for voice and piano	
88/2	595	1817	1827	Song "Thekla (eine Geisterstimme)" ['Wo ich sei und wo mich hingewendet'] for voice and piano (2nd setting, 2nd version)	
88/3	862	1825 and 1826?	1827	Song "Um Mitternacht" ['Keine Stimme hör' ich schallen'] for voice and piano (2nd version)	
88/4	547	1817	1827	Song "An die Musik" ['Du holde Kunst'] for voice and piano (2nd version)	
89	911	1827	1828	Song cycle Winterreise for voice and piano: 1. "Gute Nacht" ['Fremd bin ich eingezogen']; 2. "Die Wetterfahne" ['Der Wind spielt mit der Wetterfahne']; 3. "Gefror'ne Tränen" ['Gefror'ne Tropfen fallen']; 4. "Erstarrung" ['Ich such' im Schnee vergebens']; 5. "Der Lindenbaum" ['Am Brunnen vor dem Tore']; 6. "Wasserflut" ['Manche Trän' aus meinen Augen']; 7. "Auf dem Flusse" ['Der du so lustig rauschtest'] (2nd version); 8. "Rückblick" ['Es brennt mir unter beiden Sohlen']; 9. "Irrlicht" ['In die tiefsten Felsengründe']; 10. "Rast" ['Nun merk' ich erst, wie müd ich bin'] (2nd version); 11. "Frühlingstraum" ['Ich träumte von bunten Blumen'] (2nd version); 12. "Einsamkeit" ['Wie eine trübe Wolke']; 13. "Die Post" ['Von der Straße her ein Posthorn klingt']; 14. "Der greise Kopf" ['Der Reif hat einen weißen Schein']; 15. "Die Krähe" ['Eine Krähe war mit mir aus der Stadt gezogen']; 16. "Letzte Hoffnung" ['Hie und da ist an den Bäumen']; 17. "Im Dorfe" ['Es bellen die Hunde']; 18. "Der stürmische Morgen" ['Wie hat der Sturm zerrissen']; 19. "Täuschung" ['Ein Licht tanzt freundlich vor mir her']; 20. "Der Wegweiser" ['Was vermeid' ich denn die Wege']; 21. "Das Wirtshaus" ['Auf einen Totenacker hat mich mein Weg gebracht']; 22. "Mut" ['Fliegt der Schnee mir ins Gesicht'] (2nd version); 23. "Die Nebensonnen" ['Drei Sonnen sah ich'] (2nd version); 24. "Der Leiermann" ['Drüben hinterm Dorfe steht ein Leiermann']	
90	899	1827	1827 (Nos. 1–2), 1857 (Nos. 3–4)	Four Impromptus for piano	
91	924	1827?	1828	Twelve Grazer Waltzes for piano	
92/1	764	1822	1828	Song "Der Musensohn" ['Durch Feld und Wald zu schweifen'] for voice and piano (2nd version)	
92/2	543	1817	1828	Song "Auf dem See" ['Und frische Nahrung'] for voice and piano (2nd version)	
92/3	142	1815 or 1816	1828	Song "Geistes-Gruß" ['Hoch auf dem alten Turme'] for voice and piano (6th version)	
93/1	834	1825	1828	Song "Im Walde" ['Ich wandre über Berg und Tal'] for voice and piano (2nd version)	
93/2	853	1825	1828	Song "Auf der Bruck" ['Frisch trabe sonder Ruh und Rast'] for voice and piano (2nd version)	
94	780	1823 (No. 3), 1824 (No. 6)	1828	Six Moments musicaux for piano	
95	866	1828?	1828	Song cycle Vier Refrainlieder for voice and piano: 1. "Die Unterscheidung" ['Die Mutter hat mich jüngst gescholten']; 2. "Bei dir allein" ['Bei dir allein empfind ich, daß ich lebe']; 3. "Die Männer sind méchant" ['Du sagtest mir es, Mutter']; 4. "Irdisches Glück" ['So mancher sieht mit finstrer Miene']	
96/1	939	1828	1828	Song "Die Sterne" ['Wie blitzen die Sterne so hell durch die Nacht'] for voice and piano	
96/2	909	1827	1828	Song "Jägers Liebeslied" ['Ich schieß' den Hirsch im grünen Forst'] for voice and piano	
96/3	768	1824	1828	Song "Wandrers Nachtlied" ['Über allen Gipfeln ist Ruh'] for voice and piano	
96/4	881	1826	1828	Song "Fischerweise" ['Den Fischer fechten Sorgen und Gram und Leid nicht an'] for voice and piano (2nd version)	
97	955	1828	1828	Song "Glaube, Hoffnung und Liebe" ['Glaube, hoffe, liebe!'] for voice and piano	
98/1	497	1816	1829	Song "An die Nachtigall" ['Er liegt und schläft'] for voice and piano	
98/2	498	1816	1829	Song "Wiegenlied" ['Schlafe, schlafe, holder süßer Knabe'] for voice and piano	
98/3	573	1817	1829	Song "Iphigenia" ['Blüht denn hier an Tauris Strande'] for voice and piano (3rd version)	
99	898	1828?	1836	Trio (No. 1) in B♭ major for violin, violoncello and piano	
100	929	1827	1828	Trio (No. 2) in E♭ major for violin, violoncello and piano	
101/1 (p)	882	1826	1828	Song "Im Frühling" ['Still sitz' ich an des Hügels Hang'] for voice and piano (2nd version)	
101/2 (p)	833	1825	1828	Song "Der blinde Knabe" ['O sagt, ihr Lieben, mir einmal'] for voice and piano (2nd version)	
101/3 (p)	546	1817	1828	Song "Trost im Liede" ['Braust des Unglücks Sturm empor'] for voice and piano (2nd version)	
102	875	1826	1831	Quintet "Mondenschein" ['Des Mondes Zauberblume lacht'] for two tenors, three basses and piano	
103	940	1828	1829	Fantasy in F minor for piano duet	
104 (p)	930	1827	1829	Trio "Der Hochzeitsbraten" ['Ach liebes Herz, ach Theobald, laß dir nur diesmal raten'] for soprano, tenor, bass and piano	
105/1	865	1828	1828	Song "Widerspruch" ['Wenn ich durch Busch und Zweig'] for voice and piano (2nd version)	
105/2	867	1826 or 1827	1828	Song "Wiegenlied" ['Wie sich der Äuglein kindlicher Himmel'] for voice and piano	
105/3	878	1826	1828	Song "Am Fenster" ['Ihr lieben Mauern hold und traut'] for voice and piano	
105/4	879	1826	1828	Song "Sehnsucht" ['Die Scheibe friert, der Wind ist rauh'] for voice and piano	
106/1	922	1827	1828	Song "Heimliches Lieben" ['O du, wenn deine Lippen mich berühren'] for voice and piano (2nd version)	
106/2	926	1827–1828	1828	Song "Das Weinen" ['Gar tröstlich kommt geronnen'] for voice and piano	
106/3	927	1827–1828	1828	Song "Vor meiner Wiege" ['Das also, das ist der enge Schrein'] for voice and piano	
106/4	891	1826	1828	Song "An Sylvia" ['Was ist Silvia, saget an'] for voice and piano, Gesang	
107	951	1828	1828	Rondo in A major for piano duet, Grand Rondeau	
108/1	884	1826	1829	Song "Über Wildemann" ['Die Winde sausen am Tannenhang'] for voice and piano	
108/2	758	1822	1829	Song "Todesmusik" ['In des Todes Feierstunde'] for voice and piano (2nd version)	
108/3	229	1815	1829	Song "Die Erscheinung" ['Ich lag auf grünen Matten'] for voice and piano	
109/1 (p)	361	1816	1829	Song "Am Bach im Frühling" ['Du brachst sie nun, die kalte Rinde'] for voice and piano (1st version)	
109/2 (p)	143	1815	1829	Song "Genügsamkeit" ['Dort raget ein Berg aus den Wolken her'] for voice and piano	
109/3 (p)	530	1817	1829	Song "An eine Quelle" ['Du kleine grünumwachs'ne Quelle'] for voice and piano	
110 (p)	594	1817	1829	Song "Der Kampf" ['Nein, länger werd' ich diesen Kampf nicht kämpfen'] for bass and piano	
111/1 (p)	189	1815	1829	Cantata "An die Freude" ['Freude, schöner Götterfunken'] for voice, unison choir and piano	
111/2 (p)	395	1816	1829	Song "Lebens-Melodien" ['Auf den Wassern wohnt mein stilles Leben'] for voice and piano	
111/3 (p)	391	1816	1829	Song "Die vier Weltalter" ['Wohl perlet im Glase'] for voice and piano	
112/1 (p)	985	1815?	1829	Quartet "Gott im Ungewitter" ['Du Schrecklicher, wer kann vor dir und deinem Donner stehn?'] for soprano, alto, tenor, bass and piano	
112/2 (p)	986	1815?	1829	Quartet "Gott der Weltschöpfer" ['Zu Gott, zu Gott flieg auf'] for soprano, alto, tenor, bass and piano	
112/3 (p)	232	1815	1829	Quartet "Hymne an den Unendlichen" ['Zwischen Himmel und Erd' '] for soprano, alto, tenor, bass and piano	
113 (p)	696	1820	1829	Six Antiphons "Sechs Antiphonen zum Palmsonntag" for mixed choir: 1. "Hosanna filio David"; 2. "In monte Oliveti"; 3. "Sanctus"; 4. "Pueri Hebraeorum"; 5. "Cum angelis et pueris" 6. "Ingrediente Domino"	
114 (p)	667	1819?	1829	Quintet in A major for violin, viola, violoncello, double bass and piano, Trout Quintet	
115/1 (p)	917	1827	1829	Song "Das Lied im Grünen" ['Ins Grüne, ins Grüne, da lockt uns der Frühling'] for voice and piano	
115/2 (p)	260	1815	1829	Song "Wonne der Wehmut" ['Trocknet nicht, trocknet nicht, Tränen der ewigen Liebe'] for voice and piano	
115/3 (p)	410	1816	1829	Song "Sprache der Liebe" ['Laß dich mit gelinden Schlägen rühren'] for voice and piano	
116 (p)	159	1816	1829	Song "Die Erwartung" ['Hör' ich das Pförtchen nicht gehen?'] for voice and piano (2nd version)	
117 (p)	149	1815	1829	Song "Der Sänger" ['Was hör' ich draußen vor dem Tor'] for voice and piano (2nd version)	
118/1 (p)	233	1815	1829	Song "Geist der Liebe" ['Wer bist du, Geist der Liebe'] for voice and piano	
118/2 (p)	221	1815	1829	Song "Der Abend" ['Der Abend blüht'] for voice and piano	
118/3 (p)	234	1815	1829	Song "Tischlied" ['Mich ergreift, ich weiß nicht wie, himmlisches Behagen'] for voice and piano	
118/4 (p)	248	1815	1829	Song "Lob des Tokayers" ['O köstlicher Tokayer, o königlicher Wein'] for voice and piano	
118/5 (p)	270	1815	1829	Song "An die Sonne" ['Sinke, liebe Sonne'] for voice and piano	
118/6 (p)	247	1815	1829	Song "Die Spinnerin" ['Als ich still und ruhig spann'] for voice and piano	
119 (p)	943	1828	1829	Song "Auf dem Strom" ['Nimm die letzten Abschiedsküsse'] for voice, horn (or violoncello) and piano	
120 (p)	664	1819 or 1825	1829	Piano Sonata in A major	
121 (p)	968B	?	1829	Deux Marches Caractéristiques in C major for piano duet	formerly D 886
122 (p)	568	1825–1826?	1829	Piano Sonata in E♭ major (2nd version)	
123 (p)	786	1823	1830	Song "Viola" ['Schneeglöcklein, o Schneeglöcklein'] for voice and piano	
124 (p)	857	1825	1829	Two songs "Zwei Szenen aus dem Schauspiel Lacrimas" for voice and piano: 1. "Lied der Delphine" ['Ach, was soll ich beginnen vor Liebe?']; 2. "Lied des Florio" ['Nun, da Schatten niedergleiten']	
125/1 (p)	87	1813	1840	String Quartet in E♭ major	
125/2 (p)	353	1816	1840	String Quartet in E major	
126 (p)	134	1815?	1830	Song "Ballade" ['Ein Fräulein schaut vom hohen Turm'] for voice and piano	
127 (p)	146	1815 and 1823	1830	Twenty Waltzes for piano, Letzte Walzer	2 versions for No. 3 – the 1st one with a Trio in E major [D 135], and the 2nd one with a Trio in A major; also, 2 versions for No. 5 – the 1st one with a Trio in B♭ major and the 2nd one with a Trio in A♭ major; NSA identifies both earlier versions as "German Dances", not "Waltzes")
128 (p)	472	1816	1830	Cantata "Kantate zu Ehren von Josef Spendou" for two sopranos, tenor, bass, mixed choir and orchestra: 1. Da liegt er, starr 2. Gottes Bild ist Furst und Staat; 3. Ein Punkt nur ist der Mensch; 4. Die Sonne sticht	see also D 470?
129 (p)	965	1828	1830	Song "Der Hirt auf dem Felsen" ['Wenn auf dem höchsten Fels ich steh'] for voice, clarinet and piano	
130 (p)	990C	1828?	1830	Song "Das Echo" ['Herzliebe gute Mutter, o grolle nicht mit mir'] for voice and piano	formerly D 868
131/1 (p)	141	1815	1830	Song "Der Mondabend" ['Rhein und freundlich lacht der Himmel'] for voice and piano	
131/2 (p)	148	1815	1830	Cantata "Trinklied" ['Brüder! unser Erdenwallen'] for tenor, men's choir and piano	
131/3 (p)	23	1812	1830	Song "Klaglied" ['Meine Ruh' ist dahin'] for voice and piano	
132 (p)	706	1820	1832	Hymn "Der 23. Psalm" ['Gott ist mein Hirt, mir wird nichts mangeln'] for two sopranos, two altos and piano	
133 (p)	757	1822	1839	Quartet "Gott in der Natur" ['Groß ist der Herr!'] for two sopranos, two altos and piano	
134 (p)	892	1826	1839?	Cantata "Nachthelle" ['Die Nacht ist heiter'] for tenor solo, two tenors, two basses and piano	
135 (p)	920	1827	1840	Cantata "Ständchen" ['Zögernd leise, in des Dunkels nächt'ger Hülle'] for alto, women's choir and piano, Notturno (2nd version)	formerly D 921
136 (p)	942	1828	ca. 1839	Cantata "Mirjams Siegesgesang" ['Rührt die Zimbel, schlagt die Saiten'] for soprano, mixed choir and piano: 1. Rührt die Zimbel, schlagt die Saiten; 2. Aus ägypten vor dem Volke; 3. Doch der Horizont erdunkelt 4. S'ist der Herr in seinem Grimme; 5. Tauchst du auf, Pharao?; 6. Drum mit Zimbeln und mit Saiten	
137/1 (p)	384	1816	1836	Sonata in D major for violin and piano	2 versions of the first movement are extant
137/2 (p)	385	1816	1836	Sonata in A minor for violin and piano	
137/3 (p)	408	1816	1836	Sonata in G minor for violin and piano	
138 (p)	608	1818	1834	Rondo in D major for piano duet, Notre amitié est invariable (2nd version)	
139/1 (p)	815	1824	1840	Quartet "Gebet" ['Du Urquell aller Güte'] for soprano, alto, tenor, bass and piano	
139/2 (p)	913	1827	1846	Quartet "Nachtgesang im Walde" ['Sei uns stets gegrüßt, o Nacht!'] for two tenors, two basses and four horns	
140 (p)	812	1824	1837	Sonata in C major for piano duet, Grand Duo	
141 (p)	324	1815	1837	Mass No. 3 in B♭ major for soprano, alto, tenor, bass, mixed choir, orchestra and organ	
142 (p)	935	1827	1839	Four Impromptus for piano	
143 (p)	784	1823	1839	Piano Sonata in A minor	
144 (p)	947	1828	1840	Allegro in A minor for piano duet, Lebensstürme	
145 (p)	506	1817?	1848	(Adagio and) Rondo in E major for piano	probably the fourth movement of the unfinished? Piano Sonata in E minor, D 566
146 (p)	763	1822	1842	Quartet "Schicksalslenker, blicke nieder" for soprano, alto, tenor, bass and piano, Des Tages Weihe	
147 (p)	575	1817	1846	Piano Sonata in B major	
148 (p)	897	1828?	1846	Trio in E♭ major for violin, violoncello and piano, Notturno	an "Adagio" movement is extant
149 (p)	811	1824	1850	Antiphon "Salve Regina" ['Salve Regina'] in C major for two tenors and two basses	
150 (p)	184	1815	ca. 1843	Gradual "Benedictus es, Domine" ['Benedictus es, Domine'] in C major for mixed choir, orchestra and organ	
151 (p)	912	1827	ca. 1845	Chorus "Schlachtlied" ['Mit unserm Arm ist nichts getan'] for double men's choir (2nd setting)	
152 (p)	952	1828	1848	Fugue in E minor for organ duet or piano duet	
153 (p)	676	1819	1845, 1888 (complete)	Offertory "Salve Regina" ['Salve Regina'] in A major for soprano and orchestra, Drittes Offertorium	
154 (p)	948	1828	1849	Hymn "Hymnus an den heiligen Geist" ['Komm, heil'ger Geist, erhöre unser Flehen'] for two tenors, two basses, men's choir, two oboes, two clarinets, two bassoons, two trumpets, two horns and three trombones (2nd version)	formerly D964
155 (p)	847	1825	1849	Quartet "Trinklied aus dem 16. Jahrhundert" ['Edit Nonna, edit Clerus'] for two tenors and two basses	
156 (p)	848	1825	1849	Quartet "Nachtmusik" ['Wir stimmen dir mit Flötensang'] for two tenors and two basses	
157 (p)	748	1822	1822	Cantata "Am Geburtstage des Kaisers" ['Steig empor, umblüht von Segen'] for soprano, alto, tenor, bass, mixed choir and orchestra	
158 (p)	666	1819	1849	Cantata "Kantate zum Geburtstag des Sängers Johann Michael Vogl" for soprano, tenor, bass and piano, Der Frühlingsmorgen: 1. Sänger, der von Herzen singet 2. Diese Berge sah'n dich blühen 3. Da saht ihr Orestes scheiden 4. Gott bewahr' dein teures Leben	
159 (p)	934	1827	1850	Fantasy in C major for violin and piano	
160 (p)	802	1824	1850	Variations in E minor for flute and piano, Trockne Blumen	2 versions of "Variation V"
161 (p)	887	1826	1851	String Quartet in G major	
162 (p)	574	1817	1851	Sonata in A major for violin and piano, Duo	
163 (p)	956	1828	1853	String Quintet in C major for two violins, viola and two violoncellos	
164 (p)	537	1817	ca. 1852	Piano Sonata in A minor	
165/1 (p)	673	1819	1862	Song "Die Liebende schreibt" ['Ein Blick von deinen Augen'] for voice and piano (2nd version)	
165/2 (p)	670	1819	1862	Song "Die Sternennächte" ['In monderhellten Nächten'] for voice and piano (2nd version)	
165/3 (p)	155	1815	1862	Song "Das Bild" ['Ein Mädchen ist's'] for voice and piano	
165/4 (p)	230	1815	1862	Song "Die Täuschung" ['Im Erlenbusch, im Tannerhain'] for voice and piano	
165/5 (p)	923	1827	1862	Song "Eine altschottische Ballade" ['Dein Schwert, wie ist's von Blut so rot'] for male voice, female voice and piano (1st version)	
166 (p)	803	1824	1853	Octet in F major for two violins, viola, violoncello, double bass, clarinet, horn and bassoon	
167 (p)	714	1820–1821	1858	Octet "Gesang der Geister über den Wassern" ['Des Menschen Seele gleicht dem Wasser'] for four tenors, four basses, two violas, two violoncellos and double bass (4th setting, 2nd version)	
168 (p)	112	1814	1863	String Quartet in B♭ major	
169 (p)	984	after 1820	ca. 1865	Quartet "Der Wintertag" ['In schöner heller Winterzeit ward eine Maid geboren'] for two tenors, two basses and piano, Geburtstaglied	fragment, piano part is lost
170 (p)	591	1817	1866	Overture in C major for orchestra, in the Italian Style	
171 (p)	790	1823	1864	Twelve German Dances for piano	also appear as "Twelve Ländler"
172/1 (p)	213	1815	1865	Song "Der Traum" ['Mir träumt' ich war ein Vögelein'] for voice and piano	
172/2 (p)	214	1815	1865	Song "Die Laube" ['Nimmer werd' ich, nimmer dein vergessen'] for voice and piano	
172/3 (p)	196	1815	1865	Song "An die Nachtigall" ['Geuß nicht so laut der liebentflammten Lieder'] for voice and piano	
172/4 (p)	231	1815	1865	Song "Das Sehnen" ['Wehmut, die mich hüllt'] for voice and piano	
172/5 (p)	283	1815	1865	Song "An den Frühling" ['Willkommen, schöner Jüngling!'] for voice and piano (1st setting)	
172/6 (p)	691	1820	1865	Song "Die Vögel" ['Wie lieblich und fröhlich'] for voice and piano	
173/1 (p)	195	1815	1867	Song "Amalia" ['Schön wie Engel voll Walhallas Wonne'] for voice and piano	
173/2 (p)	793	1823	1867	Song "Das Geheimnis" ['Sie konnte mir kein Wörtchen sagen'] for voice and piano (2nd setting)	
173/3 (p)	177	1815	1867	Song "Vergebliche Liebe" ['Ja, ich weiß es, diese treue Liebe'] for voice and piano	
173/4 (p)	731	1821	1867	Song "Der Blumen Schmerz" ['Wie tönt es mir so schaurig'] for voice and piano	
173/5 (p)	519	1817?	1867	Song "Die Blumensprache" ['Es deuten die Blumen des Herzens Gefühle'] for voice and piano	
173/6 (p)	627	1818	1867	Song "Das Abendrot" ['Du heilig, glühend Abendrot!'] for bass and piano	
