= Leidesdorf =

Leidesdorf may refer to:

- Maximilian Leidesdorf (1816 – 1889), Austrian psychiatrist
- Maximilian Joseph Leidesdorf (1787 – 1840), Austrian pianist, composer and musical publisher
- Samuel David Leidesdorf (1881 – 1968), American accountant
