= Op. 143 =

In music, Op. 143 stands for Opus number 143. Compositions that are assigned this number include:

- Karg-Elert – Organ Symphony
- Ries – Piano Trio in C minor
- Schubert – Piano Sonata in A minor, D 784
- Schumann – "Das Glück von Edenhall" (Uhland) for solo voice, chorus, and orchestra
