= Matthäus Casimir von Collin =

Austrian poet and editor (1779–1824)

Matthäus Casimir von Collin (3 March 1779 – 23 November 1824) was a leading poet in Vienna. Some of his works have been set to music by Schubert, such as Licht und Liebe (D.352), Der Zwerg (D. 771), Wehmut (D. 772) and Nacht und Träume (D. 827).

Matthäus Casimir von Collin was born in Vienna, the younger brother of the Viennese poet and playwright Heinrich Joseph von Collin.

He was editor of the Wiener Jahrbücher der Literatur. He was sympathetic to the Romantic movement, and intimate with its leaders. His dramas on themes from Austrian national history (Belas Krieg mit dem Vater, 1808; Der Tod Friedrichs des Streitbaren, 1813) may be regarded as the immediate precursors of Grillparzer's historical tragedies.

From 1815 until his death, he was one of the preceptors of the Duke of Reichstad, along with captain Johann Baptist von Foresti and under the direction of Count Moritz von Dietrichstein.

He is the subject of a monograph by F. Laban (1879).

He died in Penzing, a former independent suburb of Vienna.
