= Piano Sonata in E minor, D 769A (Schubert) =

The Piano Sonata in E minor D 769A (formerly D. 994) is a piano sonata written by Franz Schubert.

== Movements ==
Opening

The sonata is incomplete, consisting of only a single movement, and even that was abandoned by the composer before completion.

Piano sonatas (2 hands) by Franz Schubert
Preceded by Sonata in E major (D. 459)	23 Sonatas numbering system No. 4	Succeeded by Sonata in A minor (D. 537)
