= Maximilian Joseph Leidesdorf =

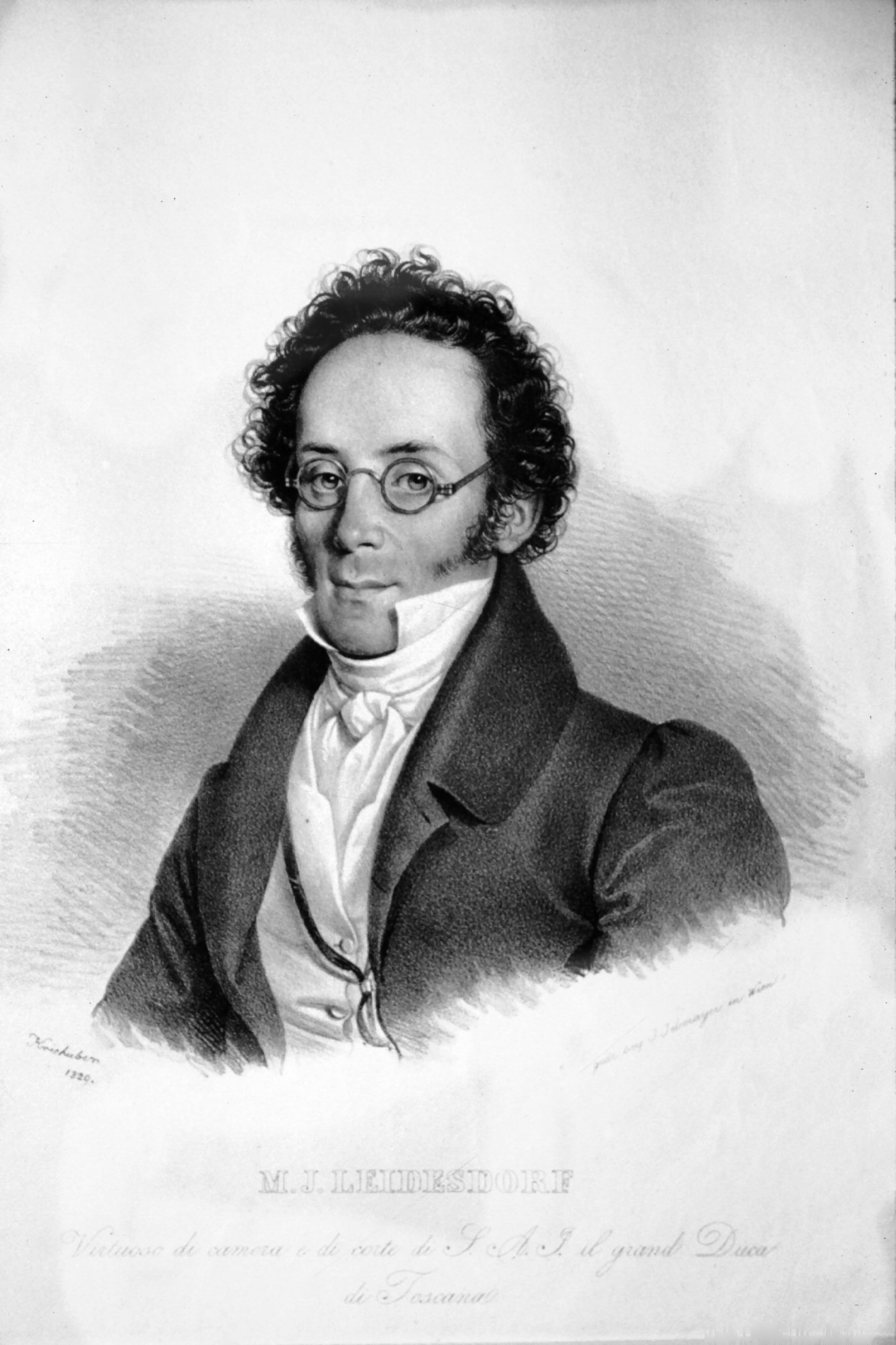
Lithograph by Josef Kriehuber

Maximilian Joseph Leidesdorf (5 July 1787 – 27 September 1840) was an Austrian pianist, composer and music publisher.

== Life ==
Leidesdorf was born in Vienna, and studied under Johann Georg Albrechtsberger, Antonio Salieri and Emanuel Aloys Förster. He became a highly regarded pianist and teacher of the piano in Vienna. In 1822 he joined the music publishing firm of Ignaz Sauer 1759–1833), which had existed since 1798 as the publishers Zu den Sieben Schwestern. Sauer withdrew from the business in 1827, and the company was eventually taken over by Diabelli in 1835.

Leidesdorf was a friend of Ludwig van Beethoven and Franz Schubert; Sauer & Leidesdorf published works by them, also works of Carl Maria von Weber and piano reductions of operas by Gioachino Rossini. The company published Schubert's works with the following opus numbers: op. 26–30, 35, 40, 59 and 69. After Sauer's retirement, Leidesdorf published Schubert's op. 92, 94 and 108.

He went in 1828 to Florence, where, after a performance of his oratorio Esther, he was appointed court pianist by the Grand Duke of Tuscany, and taught at the local conservatory. He died in Florence in 1840.

He was the father of the psychiatrist Maximilian Leidesdorf.

== Works ==
Leidesdorf composed orchestral and chamber music, three masses, a cantata St Cecilia, an oratorio Esther, other choral pieces, songs, and piano music, including arrangements of operas. He was one of the composers who contributed a variation on a theme of Anton Diabelli for Vaterländischer Künstlerverein. A Dictionary of Music and Musicians (1900) commented that "Leidesdorf was a prolific writer of pianoforte pieces, much esteemed by amateurs."
