= Maximilian Leidesdorf =

Austrian psychiatrist

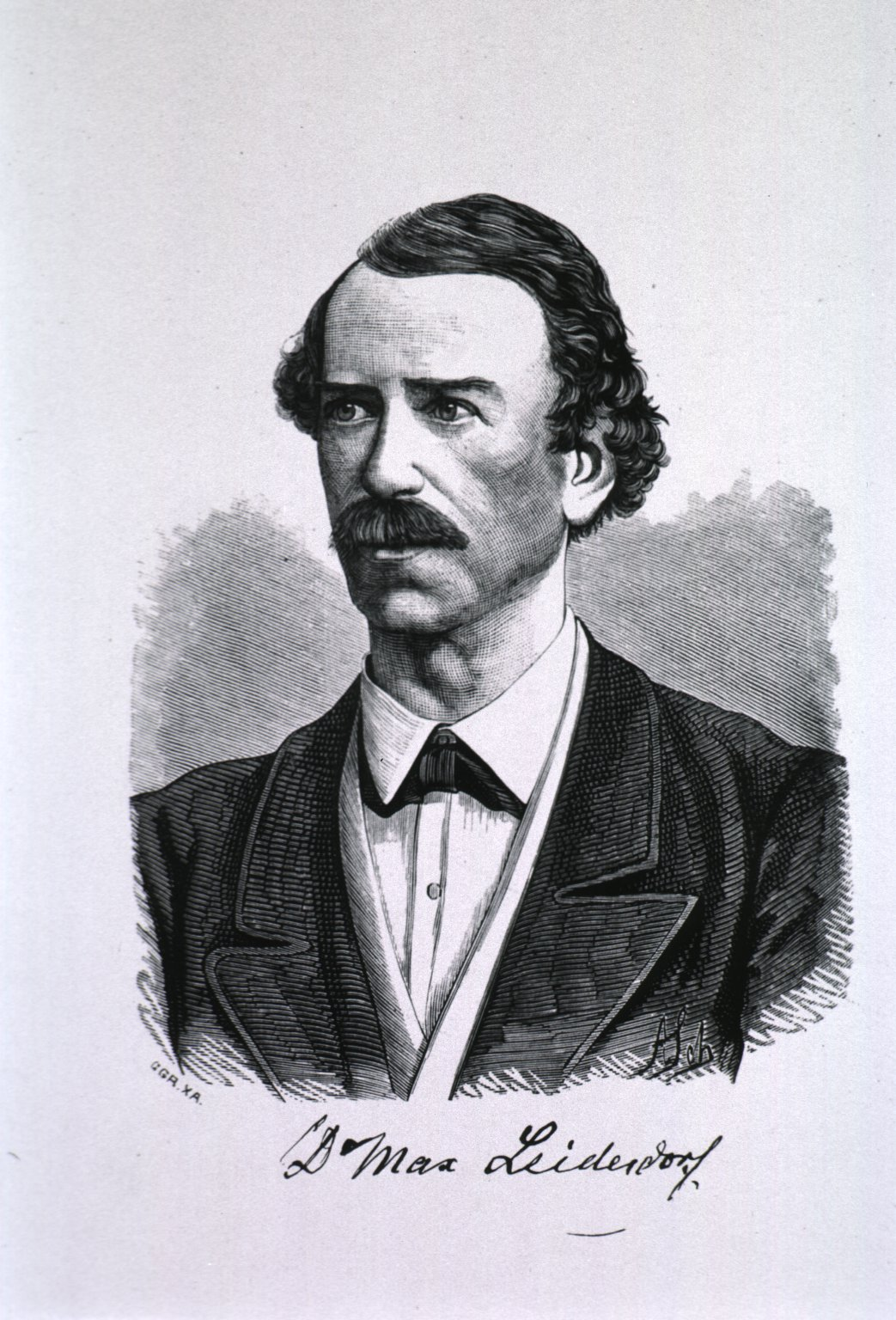
Maximilian Leidesdorf (1818-1889)

Maximilian Leidesdorf (27 June 1818 – 9 October 1889) was an Austrian psychiatrist born in Vienna. He was the son of the composer Maximilian Joseph Leidesdorf.

In 1845 he received his medical doctorate from the University of Vienna, afterwards visiting asylums in Italy, Germany, England and France. In 1856 he received his habilitation in Vienna, where he practiced medicine for the remainder of his career. In 1872 he became head of the department of mental illness at Vienna General Hospital, followed by an appointment in 1875 as director of the Landesirrenanstalt (State Lunatic Asylum). One of his famous assistants was Julius Wagner-Jauregg (1857-1940), winner of the 1927 Nobel Prize in Physiology or Medicine.

Much of his written work dealt with the correlation between physical and mental illnesses. With Theodor Meynert (1833-1892), he was co-founder of the quarterly psychiatric journal Vierteljahresschrift für Psychiatrie.

In 1876 he was summoned to Constantinople to examine the mental state of dethroned Sultan Murad V, and in 1886 was asked for advice on the mental condition of King Ludwig II of Bavaria.

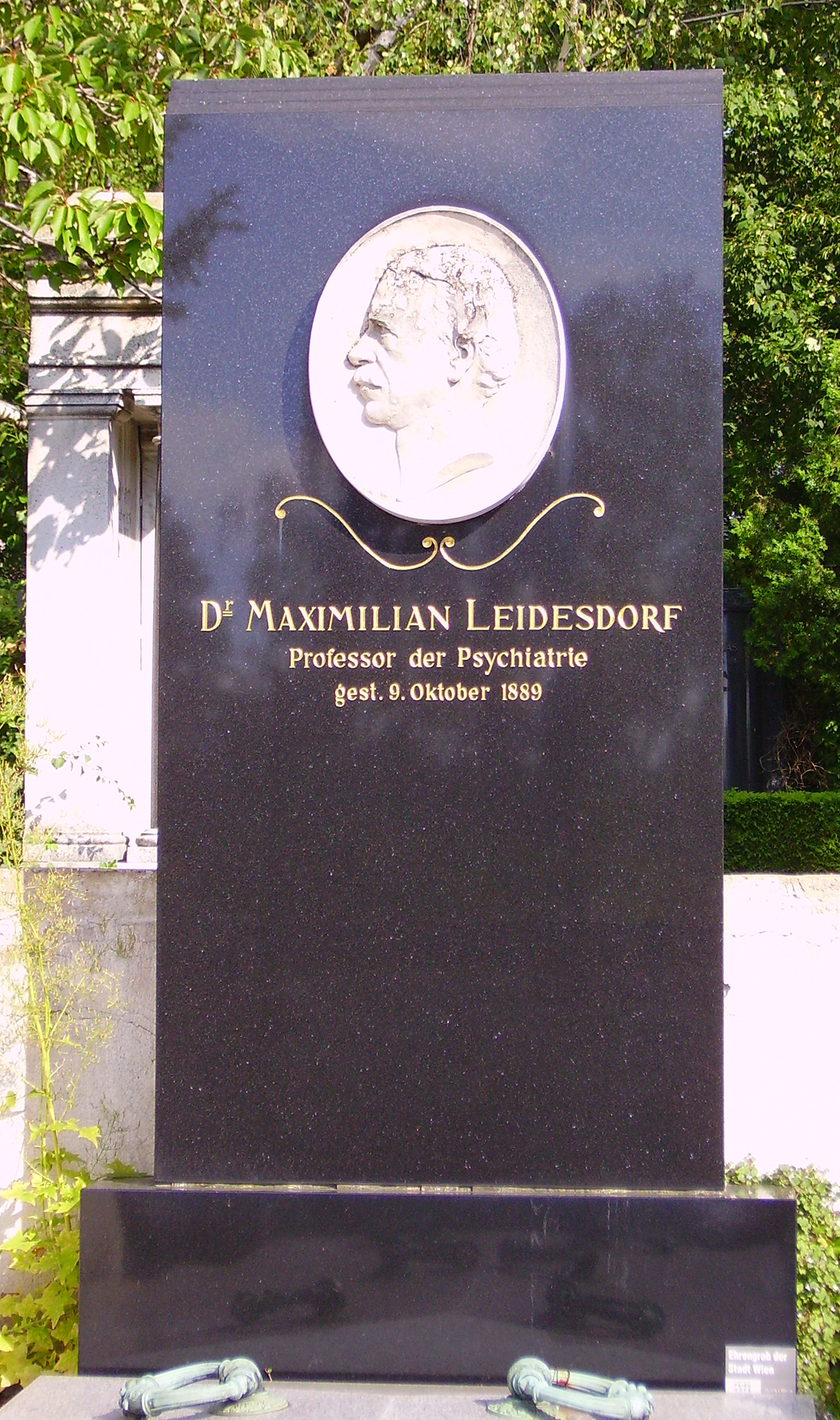
Gravesite of Leidesdorf at Döbling Cemetery (Vienna)

== Written works ==
- Beiträge zur Diagnostik und Behandlung der Primären Formen des Irreseins, Krefeld, (1855)
- Das Römerbad Tüffer in Steiermark, Vienna, (1857).
- Compendium der Psychiatrie für Aerzte und Studirende, (1860).
- Pathologie und Therapie der psychischen Krankheiten, Erlangen, (1860).
- Erläuterungen zur Irrenhausfrage Niederösterreichs, Vienna, (1868).
- Vierteljahresschrift für Psychiatrie (with Theodor Meynert).
- Psychiatrische Studien aus der Klinik Leidesdorf, (1877).
- Das Traumleben, Vienna, (1880).
