= Du bist die Ruh' =

1823 song by Franz Schubert

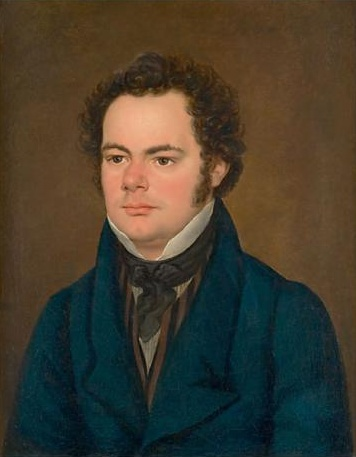
Portrait of Franz Schubert by Franz Eybl (1827)

"Du bist die Ruh' " (You are rest and peace), D. 776; Op. 59, No. 3 is a Lied composed by Franz Schubert in 1823. The text is from a set of poems by the German poet Friedrich Rückert (1788–1866). It is the third poem in a set of four. This song is set for solo voice and piano.

== Description and analysis ==
Rückert's poem was originally untitled. Schubert used the poem's first line as the title of the song. Rückert later titled his poem "Kehr ein bei mir" (Stay with me).

Franz Liszt transcribed many of Schubert's songs for piano, including "Du bist die Ruh" (S. 558/3). The melody and harmonies are all Schubert's but with the addition of Liszt's own interpretation, while still staying true to the original meaning of Rückert's poem.

The piece is in triple meter (3/8) and is marked larghetto (fairly slow) and pianissimo (very soft). The piece is in bar form and its original key is E♭ major. It starts with both hands playing broken triads softly and slowly in treble clef.

The simplicity of the melody makes this piece that much more difficult to sing as it requires perfect legato and breath control. Any inconsistencies in the sound can disrupt the 'peace' of the poem. Schubert sets tender and gentle themes to Rückert's words, and the simplicity of the piano line further enhances the meaning of the song. The progression of the harmonies repeat with the bar form, always establishing the key of the piece. With a pianissimo and larghetto marking and the piano part light in texture, Schubert sets up the poem for the first few lines, "You are the calm, the mild peace", in the introduction.

The piece has five stanzas. The first and second verses are almost exactly identical to the third and fourth, with the exception of one note. The fifth (and final) verse is the start of the B section ("Dies Augenzelt, von deinem Glanz allein erhellt, o füll es ganz!"). Both the piano and the voice have a marking of pianissimo up until measure 57, when there is finally a crescendo. This is in the first few bars of the B section. In measure 59, Schubert marks forte. Here is the climax as well as the highest note of the piece along with a decrescendo. There is then a bar of rest and Schubert marks the next entrance at pianissimo once again. Perhaps this is to reinforce the mood of the song. "What could be more restful than silence?" Schubert repeats this text, thereby creating a sixth verse. He then ends the vocal line on the dominant (B♭), which leaves the piano to resolve the harmony. Throughout the piece, Schubert sets words like "joy" on the tonic, and words like "pain" on the dominant harmonies.

== Text ==
Sheet music with original and translated into Ukrainian lyrics

Du bist die Ruh',
der Friede mild,
die Sehnsucht du,
und was sie stillt.

Ich weihe dir
voll Lust und Schmerz
zur Wohnung hier
mein Aug' und Herz.

Kehr' ein bei mir,
und schließe du
still hinter dir
die Pforten zu.

Treib' andern Schmerz
aus dieser Brust!
Voll sei dies Herz
von deiner Lust.

Dies Augenzelt,
von deinem Glanz
allein erhellt,
O füll es ganz!

You are the calm,
the mild peace,
you my longing
and what stills it.

I consecrate to you
full of joy and grief
to dwell here
my eye and heart.

Come in to me,
and softly close
the gates
behind you.

Drive other pain
from this breast.
Full be my heart
of your joy.

The canopy of my eyes
by your splendour
alone is lit,
O, fill it completely!

== Other settings ==
"Du bist die Ruh" was also set to music by Fanny Hensel in her Opus 7 in 1839.
