= Lachen und Weinen =

Art song by Franz Schubert

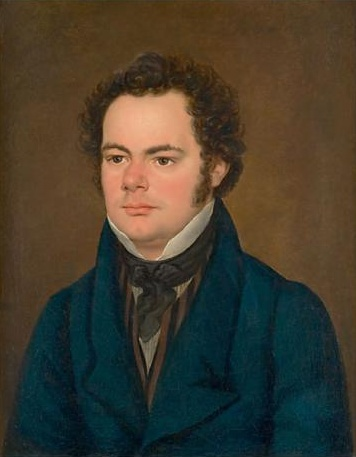
Portrait of Franz Schubert by Franz Eybl (1827)

"Lachen und Weinen" (Laughing and Weeping) is a Lied composed by Franz Schubert in 1822 and published in 1826. It is D. 777 in Otto Erich Deutsch's catalog. The text is from Friedrich Rückert's collection of poems, Östliche Rosen (Eastern Roses), which was highly influenced by the poetry of the Persian poet Hafis. The poem was untitled in the collection, so Schubert named it after the beginning words.

The tempo marking is Etwas geschwind (Somewhat fast). Throughout the song, major and minor tonal fluctuations between A♭ major and A♭ minor reflect Schubert's impression of the meanings of the words.

== Text ==
Lachen und Weinen zu jeglicher Stunde
Ruht bei der Lieb auf so mancherlei Grunde.
Morgens lacht' ich vor Lust;
Und warum ich nun weine
Bei des Abendes Scheine,
Ist mir selb' nicht bewusst.

Weinen und Lachen zu jeglicher Stunde
Ruht bei der Lieb auf so mancherlei Grunde.
Abends weint' ich vor Schmerz;
Und warum du erwachen
Kannst am Morgen mit Lachen,
Muss ich dich fragen, o Herz.

Laughter and tears at any hour
Rest on love in so many ways
In the morning I laugh for joy;
And why I now weep
In the evening glow,
Is something unknown to me.

Tears and laughter at any hour
Rest on love in so many ways
In the evening I weep for sorrows
And why you can awake
In the morning with laughter,
I must ask you, o heart.
