= Six moments musicaux (Schubert) =

1828 collection of short solo piano works

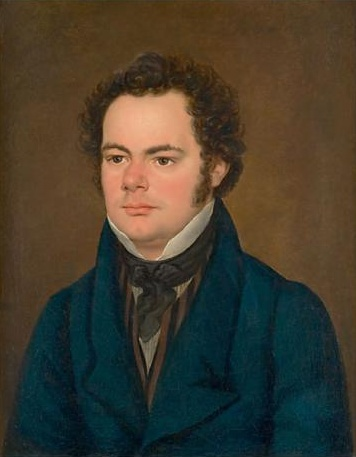
Schubert in 1827

Six moments musicaux, D. 780 (Op. 94) is a collection of six short pieces for solo piano composed by Franz Schubert. Along with the Impromptus, they are among the most frequently played of all Schubert's piano music, and have been recorded many times. No. 3 in F minor has been arranged by Karl Tausig, Leopold Godowsky and others.

== Background ==
It has been said that Schubert was deeply influenced in writing these pieces by the Impromptus, Op. 7, of Jan Václav Voříšek (1822). These pieces have been described as "akin to Beethoven’s Bagatelles in their brevity and quixotic character."

They were published by Leidesdorf in Vienna in 1828, under the title "Six Momens [sic] musicals [sic]". The standard French forms are now usually used – moments (instead of momens), and musicaux (instead of musicals). Because the title is not Schubert's own, it has been argued that we "might reasonably conclude that these are not really 'moments' of music at all, as some of the six pieces last more than five or six minutes."

The sixth number was published in 1824 in a Christmas album under the title Les plaintes d'un troubadour.

== Structure ==
I. Moderato in C major

II. Andantino in A♭ major

III. Allegro moderato in F minor

IV. Moderato in C♯ minor

V. Allegro vivace in F minor

VI. Allegretto in A♭ major
All performed by Bernd Krueger

The movements are as follows:

1. Moderato in C major
2. Andantino in A♭ major
3. Allegro moderato in F minor (ends in F major)
4. Moderato in C♯ minor
5. Allegro vivace in F minor (ends in F major)
6. Allegretto in A♭ major (ends on an open octave in an A♭ minor context)

== Performances ==
The entire D. 780 set has been recorded by Edwin Fischer, András Schiff (for Decca), as well as and not limited to Claudio Arrau, Alfred Brendel, Imogen Cooper, Emil Gilels, Paul Lewis, Radu Lupu, Artur Schnabel, Mitsuko Uchida, Maria João Pires, Alexandre Tharaud, Jenő Jandó, David Fray, and Martin Helmchen. Individual pieces from the set have been recorded by Sviatoslav Richter, Stanislav Ioudenitch, Daniel Barenboim, and Vladimir Horowitz. The set was recorded on fortepianos by András Schiff (for ECM), Melvyn Tan, Lambert Orkis, Peter Katin, Jan Vermeulen, Trudelies Leonhardt, Olga Tverskaya and Ghislain Potvlieghe. Nos. 2 and 3 were recorded live by Malcolm Bilson on an 1830 André Stein piano in the Brahms-Saal of the Musikverein in Vienna.

=== In dance ===
Isadora Duncan choreographed a dance to No. 3 in F Minor (Allegro moderato) around 1908.
