= Der Zwerg (Schubert) =

Lied for voice and piano by Franz Schubert

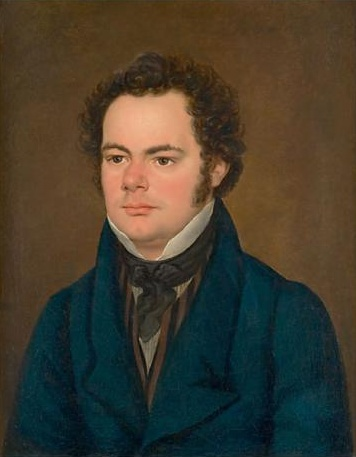
Portrait of Franz Schubert by Franz Eybl (1827)

Der Zwerg (The Dwarf) is a lied (or ballad) for voice and piano by Franz Schubert, written in the mid-1820s on a text by Matthäus von Collin. The poem is in terza rima. In Otto Erich Deutsch's catalogue of Schubert's works, it is Op. 22, No. 1, D. 771.

The singer sings in three different voices: the Dwarf, his mistress the Queen (whom the Dwarf strangles with a red silk scarf in the song), and the narrator.

Recordings are available by several notable singers, including George London, Dietrich Fischer-Dieskau, Lula Mysz-Gmeiner, Thomas Quasthoff, Jessye Norman, Ian Bostridge, and Matthias Goerne.

== Song text ==
Im trüben Licht verschwinden schon die Berge,
Es schwebt das Schiff auf glatten Meereswogen,
Worauf die Königin mit ihrem Zwerge.

Sie schaut empor zum hochgewölbten Bogen,
Hinauf zur lichtdurchwirkten blauen Ferne;
Die mit der Milch des Himmels blaß durchzogen.

"Nie, nie habt ihr mir gelogen noch, ihr Sterne,"
So ruft sie aus, "bald werd' ich nun entschwinden,
Ihr sagt es mir, doch sterb' ich wahrlich gerne."

Da tritt der Zwerg zur Königin, mag binden
Um ihren Hals die Schnur von roter Seide,
Und weint, als wollt' er schnell vor Gram erblinden.

Er spricht: "Du selbst bist schuld an diesem Leide
Weil um den König du mich hast verlassen,
Jetzt weckt dein Sterben einzig mir noch Freude.

"Zwar werd' ich ewiglich mich selber haßen,
Der dir mit dieser Hand den Tod gegeben,
Doch mußt zum frühen Grab du nun erblassen."

Sie legt die Hand aufs Herz voll jungem Leben,
Und aus dem Aug' die schweren Tränen rinnen,
Das sie zum Himmel betend will erheben.

"Mögst du nicht Schmerz durch meinen Tod gewinnen!"
Sie sagt's; da küßt der Zwerg die bleichen Wangen,
D'rauf alsobald vergehen ihr die Sinnen.

Der Zwerg schaut an die Frau, von Tod befangen,
Er senkt sie tief ins Meer mit eig'nen Händen,
Ihm brennt nach ihr das Herz so voll Verlangen,
An keiner Küste wird er je mehr landen.
