= Valses Sentimentales and Valses Nobles (Schubert) =

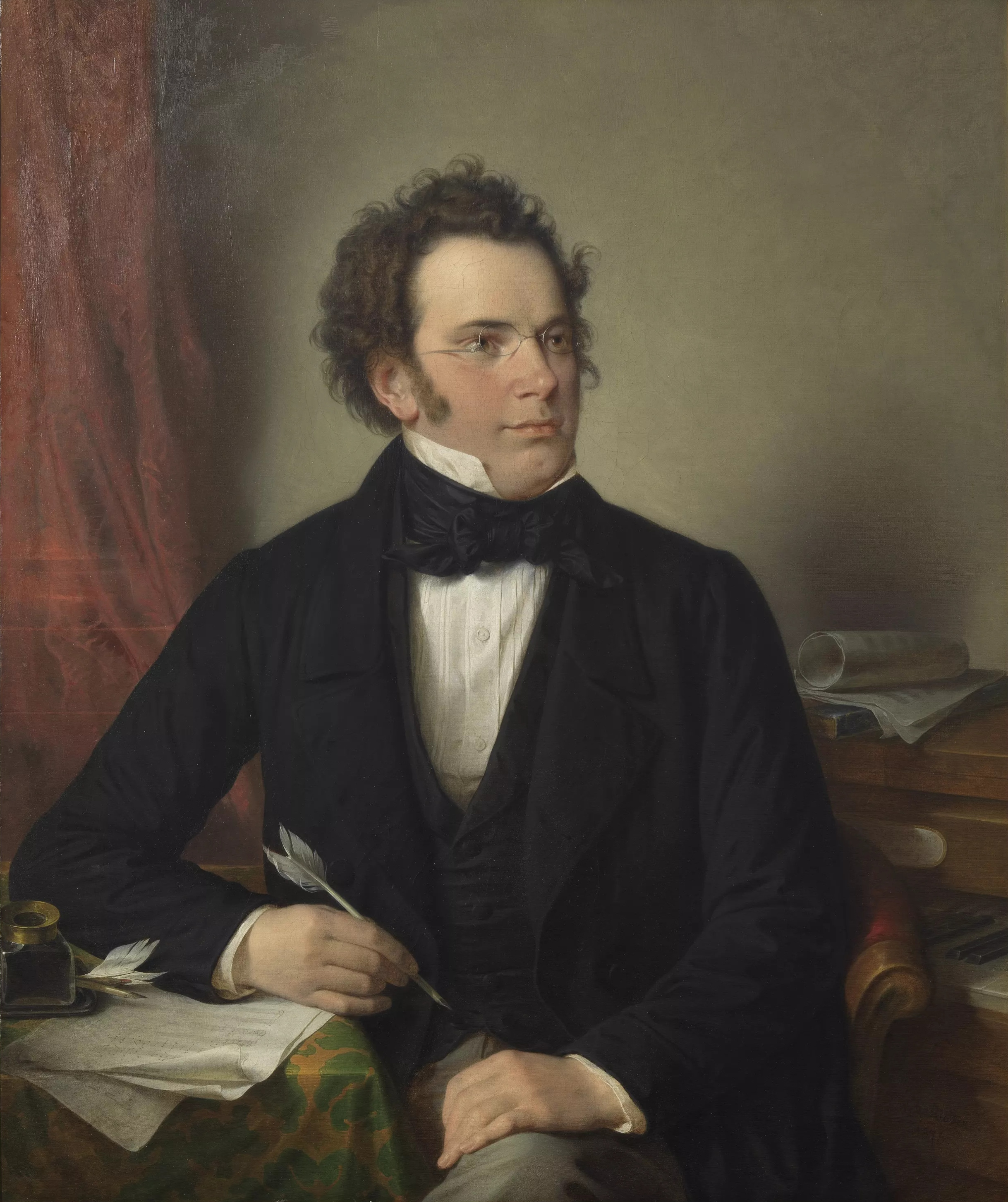
1875 portrait of Franz Schubert, after an 1825 original

Franz Schubert wrote about a hundred waltzes for piano solo. Particularly well known among these are two named collections, the 34 Valses Sentimentales (Op. 50, D. 779) and the 12 Valses Nobles (Op. 77, D. 969).

== Composition history and background ==
The Valses Sentimentales were written in 1823, and the Valses Nobles are believed to have been written in 1827, the year before Schubert's death, although the manuscript is undated.
