= Auf dem Wasser zu singen =

1823 Lied composed by Franz Schubert

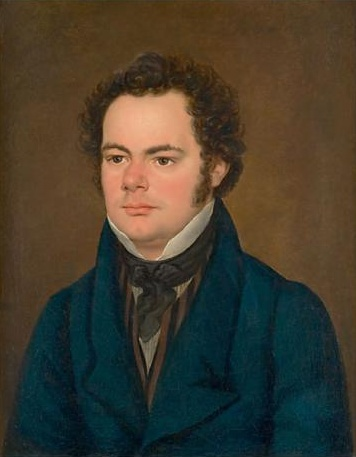
Portrait of Franz Schubert by Franz Eybl (1827)

Auf dem Wasser zu singen (To sing on the water), D. 774, is a Lied composed by Franz Schubert in 1823, based on the poem of the same name by Friedrich Leopold zu Stolberg-Stolberg.

The text describes a scene on the water from the perspective of the narrator who is in a boat, and delves into the narrator's reflections on the passing of time. The song's piano accompaniment recreates the texture of the shimmering waves (der Freude sanftschimmernden Wellen) mentioned in the third line of the poem and its rhythmic style in the 6/8 meter is reminiscent of a barcarole. Harmonically, the song as a whole and within each stanza traces a movement from the minor mode to the major mode: the song begins in A♭ minor and ends in A♭ major.

Franz Liszt transcribed the piece for solo piano, S. 558.

== Text ==
Mitten im Schimmer der spiegelnden Wellen
Gleitet, wie Schwäne, der wankende Kahn;
Ach, auf der Freude sanftschimmernden Wellen
Gleitet die Seele dahin wie der Kahn;
Denn von dem Himmel herab auf die Wellen
Tanzet das Abendrot rund um den Kahn.

Über den Wipfeln des westlichen Haines
Winket uns freundlich der rötliche Schein;
Unter den Zweigen des östlichen Haines
Säuselt der Kalmus im rötlichen Schein;
Freude des Himmels und Ruhe des Haines
Atmet die Seel' im errötenden Schein.

Ach, es entschwindet mit tauigem Flügel
Mir auf den wiegenden Wellen die Zeit.
Morgen entschwindet mit schimmerndem Flügel
Wieder wie gestern und heute die Zeit,
Bis ich auf höherem, strahlenden Flügel
Selber entschwinde der wechselnden Zeit.
