= Friedrich Rückert =

German poet, translator, and professor of Oriental languages (1788–1866)

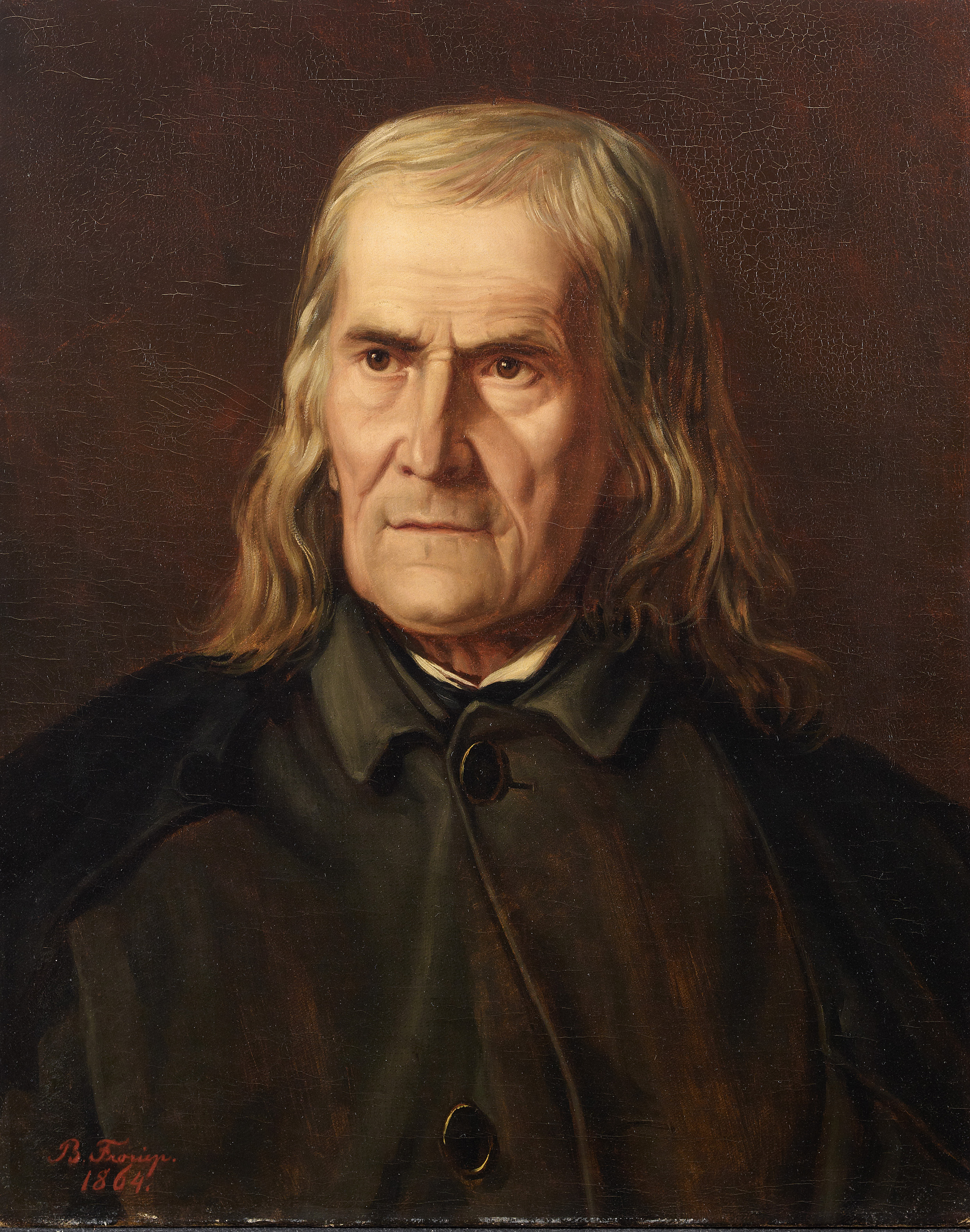
- Rückert portrait by Bertha Froriep (1864)
- Born: Johann Michael Friedrich Rückert; 16 May 1788; Schweinfurt, Holy Roman Empire
- Died: 31 January 1866 (aged 77); Neuseß, Coburg, Saxe-Coburg and Gotha, German Confederation
- Resting place: Neuseß, Coburg
- Education: University of Würzburg; Heidelberg University
- Occupation: Professor of Oriental languages
- Spouse: Luise Wiethaus-Fischer
- Writing career
- Language: German
- Years active: 1814–1866
- Genre: Poetry
- Notable works: Die Weisheit des Brahmanen (The Wisdom of the Brahmins) and Liebesfrühling (Spring of Love)

Johann Michael Friedrich Rückert (German: [ˈʁʏkɐt]; 16 May 1788 – 31 January 1866) was a German poet, translator, and professor of Oriental languages.

== Biography ==
Johann Michael Friedrich Rückert was born 16 May 1788 in Schweinfurt and was the eldest son of a lawyer, Johann Adam Rückert, and his wife, Maria Barbara (née Schwappach). He was educated at the local Gymnasium and at the universities of Würzburg and Heidelberg. From 1816 to 1817, he worked on the editorial staff of the Morgenblatt at Stuttgart. Nearly the whole of the year 1818 he spent in Rome, and afterwards he lived for several years at Coburg (1820–1826), where he married Luise Wiethaus-Fischer in 1821.

He was appointed a professor of Oriental languages at the University of Erlangen in 1826, and, in 1841, he was called to a similar position in Berlin, where he was also made a privy councillor. In 1849 he resigned his professorship at Berlin, and went to live full-time in his Gut (estate) at Neuses (now a part of Coburg).

When Rückert began his literary career, Germany was at war with Napoleon; and in his first volume, Deutsche Gedichte (German Poems), published in 1814 under the pseudonym Freimund Raimar, he gave, particularly in the powerful Geharnischte Sonette (Sonnets in Arms/Harsh Words), vigorous expression to the prevailing sentiment of his countrymen. From 1815 to 1818, appeared Napoleon, eine politische Komödie in drei Stücken (Napoleon, a Political Comedy in Three Parts), of which only two parts were published. In 1817, Der Kranz der Zeit (The Wreath of Time), was published.

He issued a collection of poems, Östliche Rosen (Eastern Roses), in 1822; and from 1834 to 1838 his Gesammelte Gedichte (Collected Poems) were published in six volumes, a selection which has passed through many editions.

Rückert was master of thirty languages and made his mark chiefly as a translator of Oriental poetry and as a writer of poems conceived in the spirit of Oriental masters. Much attention was attracted by a translation of the Maqamat of Al-Hariri of Basra (Hariris Makamen) in 1826, Nal und Damajanti, an Indian tale, in 1828, Rostem und Suhrab, eine Heldengeschichte (Rostem and Suhrab, a Story of Heroes) in 1830, and Hamasa, oder die ältesten arabischen Volkslieder (Hamasa, or the Oldest Arabian Folk Songs) in 1846.

Among his original writings dealing with Oriental subjects are:

- Morgenländische Sagen und Geschichten (Oriental Myths and Poems) (1837)
- Erbauliches und Beschauliches aus dem Morgenland (Edifying and Contemplative, from the Orient) (1836–1838)
- Brahmanische Erzählungen (Brahmin Stories) (1839).

The most elaborate of his works is Die Weisheit des Brahmanen (The Wisdom of the Brahmins), published in six volumes from 1836 to 1839. The former and Liebesfrühling (Spring of Love) (1844), a cycle of love-songs, are the best known of all Rückert's productions.

From 1843 to 1845 he issued the dramas Saul und David (1843), Herodes der Große ("Herod the Great") (1844), Kaiser Heinrich IV (1845) and Christofero Colombo (1845), all of which are considered greatly inferior to the work to which he owes his place in German literature. At the time of the Danish war in 1864 he wrote Ein Dutzend Kampflieder für Schleswig-Holstein (A Dozen Battle Songs for Schleswig-Holstein), which, although published anonymously, made considerable impression on audiences.

Rückert died in 1866, aged 77, in Neuses, now part of Coburg. He is buried in the cemetery there.

Rückert's poetry was commonly set to music and there are about 121 settings of his work – making him the fourth most-set German poet, behind Goethe, Heine and Rilke. Among the composers who set his poetry to music are Schubert, Robert and Clara Schumann, Brahms (including Two Songs for Voice, Viola and Piano, among others), Josef Rheinberger, Mahler (song cycles Kindertotenlieder and Rückert-Lieder), Max Bruch, Max Reger, and Elise Schmezer.

== Memorials ==
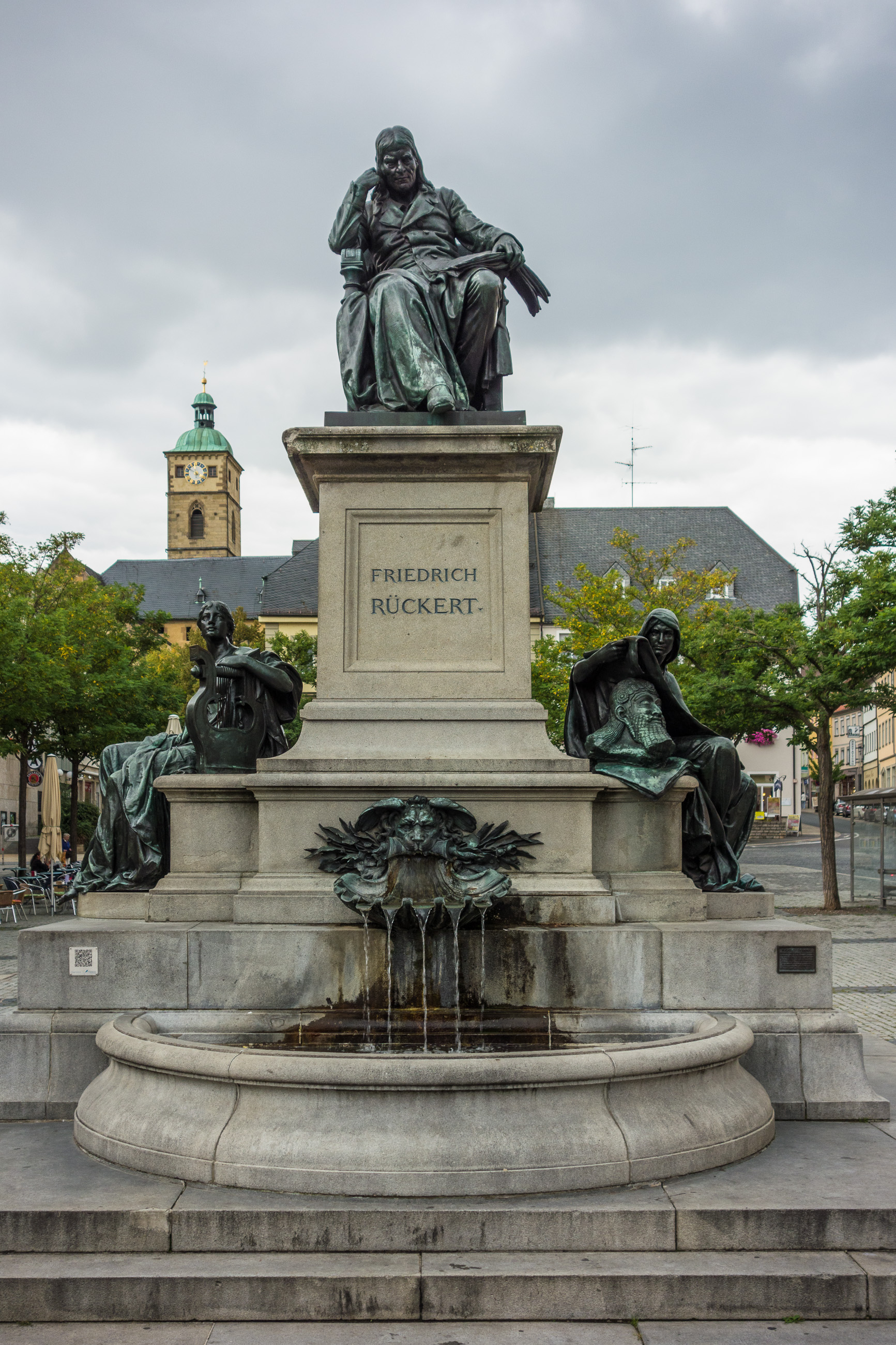
Rückert Denkmal (monument) in Schweinfurt in 2014

A monument to Rückert is situated at Marktplatz in Schweinfurt. The monument of Rückert, whose birth house stands at the southeast corner of the town hall, has stood in the central square of Schweinfurt since 1890. It was created by architect Friedrich Ritter von Thiersch and sculptor Wilhelm von Rühmann. Allegorical figures from his works – Geharnischte Sonette ("Withering Sonnets") and Weisheit des Brahmanen ("Wisdom of the Brahmans") – are situated at the feet of the bronze Rückert.

Rückert is also commemorated by a small museum in his home at Neuses (now in Friedrich-Rückert-Strasse) and a park, Rückertpark which also features a memorial bust.

== Literature ==
If you love for the sake of beauty - Friedrich Rückert

A comprehensive but by no means complete edition of Rückert's poetical works appeared in 12 volumes in 1868–1869. Subsequent editions have been edited by L. Laistner (1896), C. Beyer (1896), G. Ellinger (1897). See B. Fortlage, F. Rückert und seine Werke (1867); C. Beyer, Friedrich Rückert, ein biographisches Denkmal (1868), Neue Mitteilungen über Rückert (1873), and Nachgelassene Gedichte Rückerts und neue Beiträge zu dessen Leben und Schriften (1877); R. Boxberger, Rückert-Studien (1878); P. de Lagarde, Erinnerungen an F. Rückert (1886); F. Muncker, Friedrich Rückert (1890); G. Voigt, Rückerts Gedankenlyrik (1891).

- Hans Wollschläger und Rudolf Kreutner (Ed.): Historisch-kritische Ausgabe in Einzelbänden, Schweinfurt 1998ff.; thus far 4 volumes in 5 parts (as of July 2004):
  - Die Weisheit des Brahmanen, 2 volumes, 1998.
  - Gedichte von Rom, 2000.
  - Liedertagebuch I/II, 1846–1847, 2001
  - Liedertagebuch III/IV, 1848–1849, 2002.
  - Liedertagebuch V/VI, 1850–1851, Erster Band, 2003.
- Hans Wollschläger (Ed.): Kindertotenlieder [1993 also as insel taschenbuch 1545].
- Hartmut Bobzin (Ed.): Der Koran in der Übersetzung von Friedrich Rückert, 4th edition, Würzburg 2001.
- Friedrich Rückert: Firdosi's Königsbuch (Schahname) Sage I–XIII. Aus dem Nachlaß herausgegeben von E. A. Bayer. 1890. Nachdruck: epubli GmbH, Berlin, 2010 ISBN 978-3-86931-356-6
- Friedrich Rückert: Firdosi's Königsbuch (Schahname) Sage XX–XXVI. Aus dem Nachlaß herausgegeben von E. A. Bayer. Nachdruck der Erstausgabe. epubli Berlin, 2010, ISBN 978-3-86931-555-3. (Details)
- Wolfgang von Keitz (Hrsg.): Oestliche Rosen. epubli, Berlin 2012, ISBN 978-3-8442-0415-5. (Details)

In 1847, Rückert also translated select verses of the Tirukkural, an ancient Tamil classic, into German.
