= Zsigmondy =

Zsigmondy is a Hungarian surname. Notable people with the surname include:

- Adolf Zsigmondy (1816–1880), Hungarian-Austrian dentist
- Dénes Zsigmondy (1922–2014), Hungarian violinist
- Emil Zsigmondy (1861–1885), Austrian doctor and mountaineer
- Jenő Zsigmondy (1888–1930), Hungarian tennis player
- Karl Zsigmondy (1867–1925), Austrian mathematician
- Richard Adolf Zsigmondy (1865–1929), Austrian chemist, Nobel prizewinner 1925

== See also ==
- Zsigmondy (crater) lunar crater named after Richard Adolf Zsigmondy
- Zsigmond
