= Jenő Zsigmondy =

Hungarian tennis player (1888–1930)

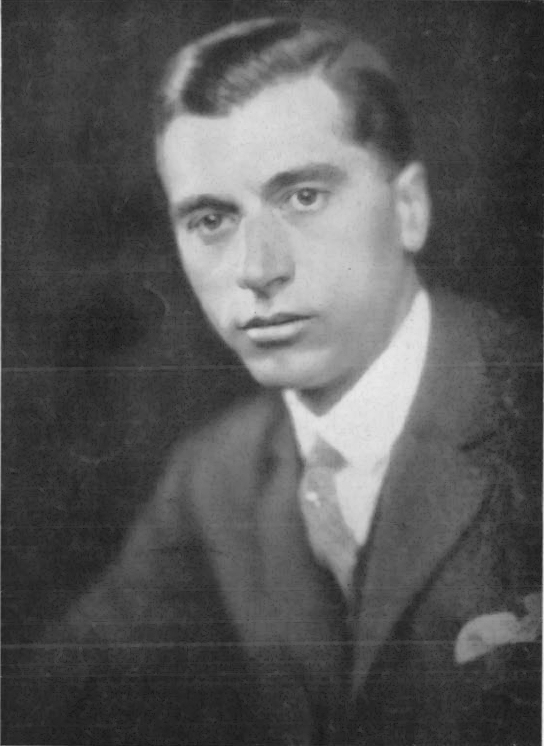
- Country (sports): Hungary
- Born: 4 July 1888 Budapest, Austria-Hungary
- Died: 30 July 1930 (aged 42) Paris, France

Singles

Other tournaments
- WHCC: 2R (1914)
- Olympic Games: 2R (1908, 1912)

Doubles

Other doubles tournaments
- WHCC: SF (1914)
- Olympic Games: 2R (1908, 1912)
- Last updated on: 24 October 2012.

Jenő Zsigmondy (4 July 1888 – 30 July 1930), also known as Jenő von Zsigmondy (Hungarian pronunciation: [ˈjɛnøː ˈʒiɡmondi]; Hungarian: Zsigmondy Jenő, French: Eugène de Zsigmondy, 4 July 1889 – 30 July 1930) was a Hungarian tennis player who was one of Hungary's top players in the early 20th century. The national champion in 1907, 1910 and 1911, he competed for Hungary at the 1908 Summer Olympics in London and the 1912 Summer Olympics in Stockholm. He was a member of Budapesti Lawn Tennis Club.

== Early life and family ==
Jenő Zsigmondy was born in 1889, son of lawyer and Aulic Councillor Jenő Zsigmondy sr. a member of the famous Zsigmondy family and Matild Bartolovics. He had a sister Viola and a brother Dezső. His first cousin twice removed was dentist Adolf Zsigmondy inventor of the Zsigmondy cross. His first cousin once removed, Adolf's son was Richard Adolf Zsigmondy a recipient of the Nobel Prize in Chemistry in 1926. His second first cousin once removed, Richard's brother Emil Zsigmondy was a mountaineer and eponym of the Zsigmondyspitze an Austrian mountain peak. His third first cousin once removed Karl Zsigmondy was the discoverer of the Zsigmondy's theorem in mathematics. His grandfather Pál was the one who established the first tennis court in Budapest capital of Hungary and brought croquet and tennis equipment from England. His father was also a member of the Hungarian Parliament between 1927 and 1932.

== Tennis career ==
In 1907 he won the Hungarian Tennis Championships singles trophy for the first time.

In 1909 he won the Hungarian Tennis Championships mixed doubles contest partnering Katalin Cséry, an achievement they repeated five more times afterwards.

In 1910 he became the national champion in singles for the second time.

In 1911 he successfully defended his national title. He was defeated by Curt Brandis in the Hungarian Athletics Club international tournament.

In 1912 he won the Tátralomnic championship. That year he also clinched the Hungarian Athletics Club international championships as well.

In 1913 Zsigmondy fell short to Béla von Kehrling for claiming his fourth national title although they won the doubles contest together.

In the 1914 World Hard Court Championships in Saint Cloud in June he teamed up with Béla von Kehrling and reached the semifinals only losing to Arthur Gore and Algernon Kingscote of Great Britain in straight sets. The same month he lost again to Kehrling in the Hungarian Lawn Tennis National Championships.

== Golf career ==
As a result of his fading health he had to give up tennis and started to pursue amateur golf. In 3–7 June 1929 Zsigmondy won a couple of titles in the Wiener Golf-Club championships, including the mixed doubles alongside Mrs. Pollack von Parnau. In handicap contest (against bogey) he was defeated by G. Hänel. In the Grave-yard handicap he finished first with a score of (17) 19 greenen. In September in the international golf challenge between Hungary and Germany Zsigmondy lost both of his matches in singles and mixed doubles. On the 7th of the same month he traveled to Vienna for the International Country Club of Lainz, but fell in the qualification rounds. In October he reached the quarterfinal of the Hungarian International Golf Championships. In the Illés Gara Memorial Tournament I. Scratch contest and III. Handicap contest he finished sixth on both events. For the Zichy travelling trophy in mid-October he earned a shared second place in Bogey handicap. In 1935 there was a Zsigmondy Jenő memorial golf contest, won by István von Rakovszky.

== Personal life ==
He studied law and in early May 1913 he graduated becoming a lawyer. He married Alice Gstettner, a singing master from Vienna. They had two daughters Magda and Éva. He died on 30 July 1930 in Paris due to a disease.
