= Violin Sonatas, Op. 137 (Schubert) =

Three compositions by Franz Schubert

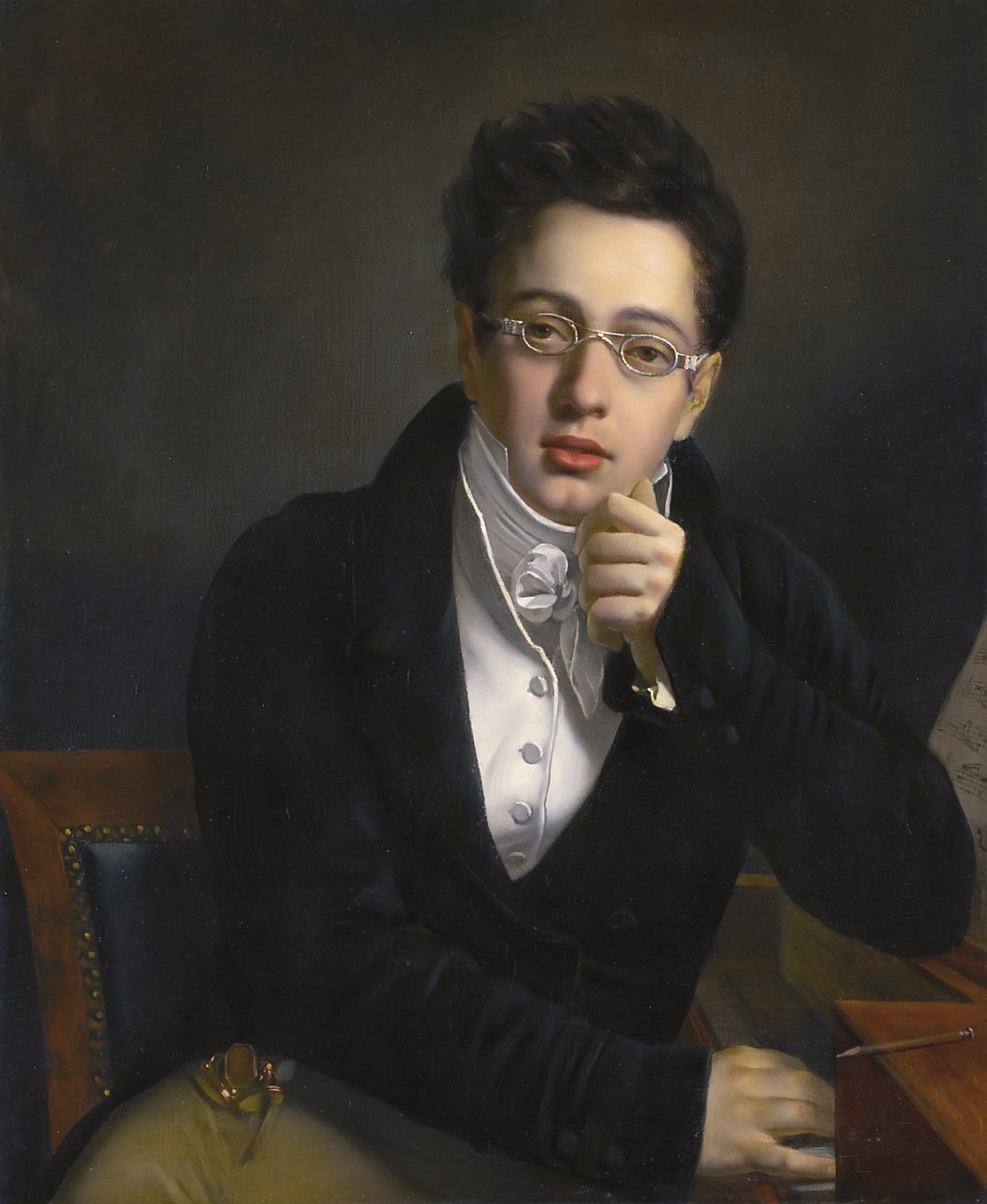
Possible portrait of the young Franz Schubert c. 1814, attributed to Josef Abel

Franz Schubert's first three violin sonatas, Op. 137 (D 384, 385, and 408) were composed in 1816. The violin sonatas were published after the composer's death as Sonatinas in 1836. These sonatas breathe an intimate atmosphere, requiring relatively little virtuoso bravura from their performers.

Schubert was an accomplished violinist and had already extensively composed for violin, including over a dozen string quartets, by the time he started to write violin sonatas at age 19. The compositions for violin and piano D 384, 385 and 408 were named Sonata in Schubert's autographs. They were named Sonatina when published posthumously as Op. 137 in 1836.

== Sonatas ==
Since Schubert's Sonatas Op. 137 are modest in size—rather to be compared to Mozart's violin sonatas than to Beethoven's—the "Sonatina" diminutive stuck to them. They are works from the Classical period but Schubert would later transition into the Romantic period through his lieder.

=== No. 1 in D major, D 384 ===
Three Sonat(in)as, Op. 137
D 384: In D major, No. 1

D 385: In A minor, No. 2

D 408: In G minor, No. 3
All performed by Dénes Zsigmondy (violin) and Anneliese Nissen (piano)

Schubert wrote "März 1816" (March 1816) on the autograph score of his Sonata for Violin and Piano in D major (D 384). The sonata has three movements:

1. Allegro molto
2. Andante
3. Allegro vivace

=== No. 2 in A minor, D 385 ===
Titled "Sonata II" and dated March 1816 in the autograph, the Sonata for Violin and Piano in A minor (D 385) has four movements:

1. Allegro moderato
2. Andante
3. Menuetto: Allegro
4. Allegro

=== No. 3 in G minor, D 408 ===
Schubert dated the Sonata for Violin and Piano in G minor (D 408) April 1816 in the autograph, and titled it "Sonata III". The sonata has four movements:

1. Allegro giusto
2. Andante
3. Menuetto: Allegro vivace
4. Allegro moderato

== Reception ==
The publication of Schubert's works for violin and piano had started in 1827 and was completed quarter of a century later.

=== Publication ===
The 19th-century collected edition published Schubert's compositions for piano and one other instrument in its eighth series in 1886, edited by Ignaz Brüll. The second to fourth pieces in that volume were Schubert's first three violin sonatas (D 384, 385 and 408), which had already been published in 1836, by Diabelli & Co. as Drei Sonatinen für Piano-Forte und Violine, Op. posth. 137.

Series VI, Volume 8 of the New Schubert Edition, published in 1970, contained the same works as series VIII of the 19th-century collected edition, but presented them in chronological order of composition, thus beginning with the three Op. 137 sonatas.

=== Recordings ===
- 1978-1979: Schubert: Music for Violin and Piano. Szymon Goldberg (violin) and Radu Lupu (piano). Decca;466 748-2 (2 CD box – also contains the Duo in A major, the Fantasy in C major, and a version of the Arpeggione Sonata).
- 2020: Schubert: 3 Violin Sonatas. Peter Sheppard Skærved (violin) and Julian Perkins (square piano). Athene Records 23208
- 1990: Schubert: Complete Works for Violin and Piano . Jaime Laredo (violin) and Stephanie Brown (piano). Dorian Recordings 90132 L]

== Sources ==
- Deutsch, Otto Erich; et al. (Walther Dürr, Arnold Feil, Christa Landon and Werner Aderhold) (1978). Franz Schubert: Thematisches Verzeichnis seiner Werke in chronologischer Folge. New Schubert Edition (in German). Kassel: Bärenreiter. ISBN 9783761805718. ISMN 9790006305148 – via Internet Archive. Series VIII (Supplement), Vol. 4
