= Tyndall effect =

Scattering of light by tiny particles in a colloidal suspension

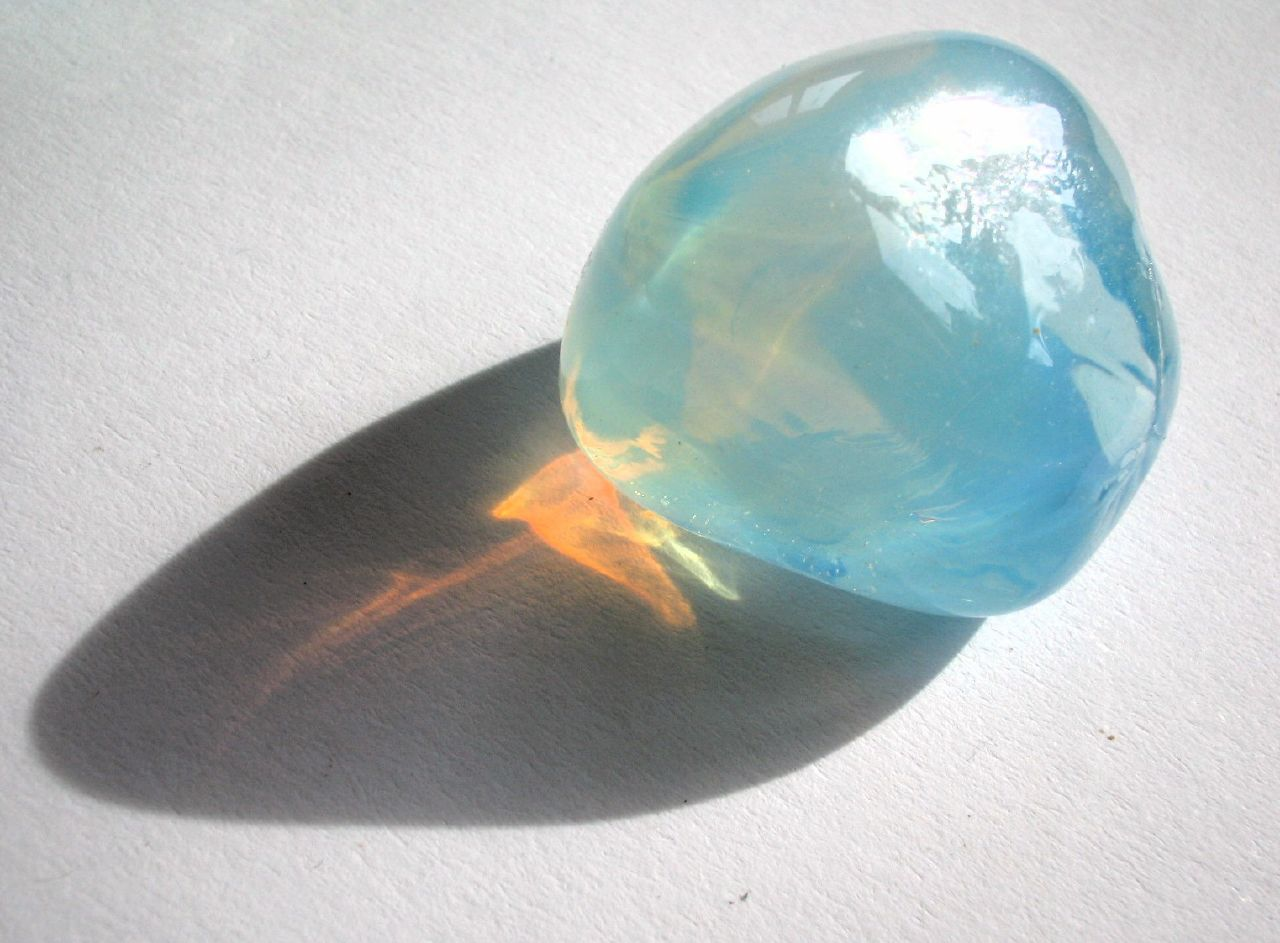
The Tyndall effect in opalescent glass: it appears blue from the side, but orange light shines through.

The Tyndall effect is light scattering by particles in a colloid such as a very fine suspension (a sol). Also known as Tyndall scattering, it is similar to Rayleigh scattering, in that the intensity of the scattered light is inversely proportional to the fourth power of the wavelength, so blue light is scattered much more strongly than red light. An example in everyday life is the blue colour sometimes seen in the smoke emitted by motorcycles, in particular two-stroke machines where the burnt engine oil provides these particles. The same effect can also be observed with tobacco smoke whose fine particles also preferentially scatter blue light.

Under the Tyndall effect, the longer wavelengths are transmitted more, while the shorter wavelengths are more diffusely reflected via scattering. The Tyndall effect is seen when light-scattering particulate matter is dispersed in an otherwise light-transmitting medium, where the diameter of an individual particle is in the range of roughly 40 to 900 nm, i.e. somewhat below or near the wavelengths of visible light (400–750 nm).

It is particularly applicable to colloidal mixtures; for example, the Tyndall effect is used in nephelometers to determine the size and density of particles in aerosols and other colloidal matter. Investigation of the phenomenon led directly to the invention of the ultramicroscope and turbidimetry.

It is named after the 19th-century physicist John Tyndall, who first studied the phenomenon extensively.

== History ==
Prior to his discovery of the phenomenon, Tyndall was primarily known for his work on the absorption and emission of radiant heat on a molecular level. In his investigations in that area, it had become necessary to use air from which all traces of floating dust and other particulates had been removed, and the best way to detect these particulates was to bathe the air in intense light. In the 1860s, Tyndall did a number of experiments with light, shining beams through various gases and liquids and recording the results. In doing so, Tyndall discovered that when gradually filling the tube with smoke and then shining a beam of light through it, the beam appeared to be blue from the sides of the tube but red from the far end. This observation enabled Tyndall to first propose the phenomenon which would later bear his name.

In 1902, the ultramicroscope was developed by Richard Adolf Zsigmondy (1865–1929) and Henry Siedentopf (1872–1940), working for Carl Zeiss AG. Curiosity about the Tyndall effect led them to apply bright sunlight for illumination and they were able to determine the size of 4 nm small gold nanoparticles that generate the cranberry glass colour. This work led directly to Zsigmondy's Nobel Prize for chemistry.

== Blue irises ==
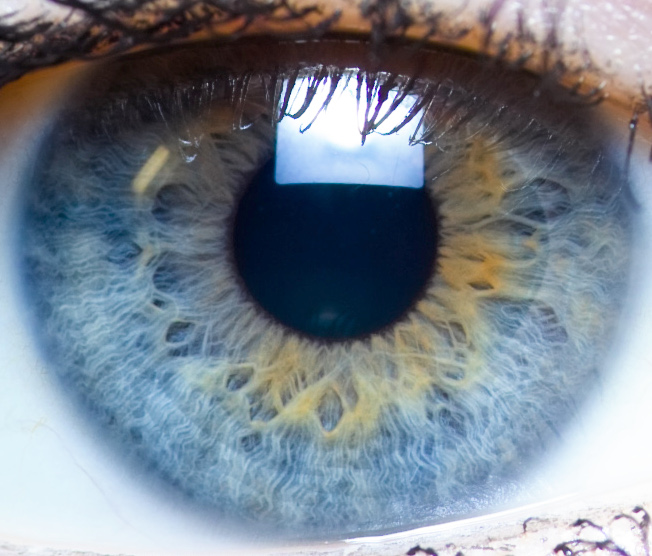
A blue iris with some melanin

The color of blue eyes is due to the Tyndall scattering of light by a translucent layer of turbid media in the iris containing numerous small particles of about 0.6 micrometers in diameter. These particles are finely suspended within the fibrovascular structure of the stroma or front layer of the iris. Some brown irises have the same layer, except with more melanin in it. Moderate amounts of melanin make hazel, dark blue and green eyes.

In eyes that contain both particles and melanin, melanin acts as an important absorbing medium, effectively absorbing incident light within the layer and thereby significantly reducing both light reflection and scattering. In the absence of melanin, the layer is translucent, the incident light is no longer sufficiently absorbed but instead primarily interacts with the microscopic particles within the medium, resulting in random, isotropically distributed diffuse scattering. Under these conditions, a noticeable portion of the light that enters this translucent layer re-emerges via a radial scattered path. That is, there is backscatter, the redirection of the light waves back out to the open air.

Scattering takes place to a greater extent at shorter wavelengths. The longer wavelengths tend to pass straight through the translucent layer with unaltered paths of yellow light, and then encounter the next layer further back in the iris, which is a light absorber called the epithelium or uvea that is colored brownish-black. The brightness or intensity of scattered blue light that is scattered by the particles is due to this layer along with the turbid medium of particles within the stroma.

Thus, the longer wavelengths are not reflected (by scattering) back to the open air as much as the shorter wavelengths. Because the shorter wavelengths are the blue wavelengths, this gives rise to a blue hue in the light that comes out of the eye. The blue iris is an example of a structural color because it relies only on the interference of light through the turbid medium to generate the color.

Blue eyes and brown eyes, therefore, are anatomically different from each other in a genetically non-variable way because of the difference between turbid media and melanin. Both kinds of eye color can remain functionally separate despite being "mixed" together.

== Similar phenomena different from Tyndall scattering ==
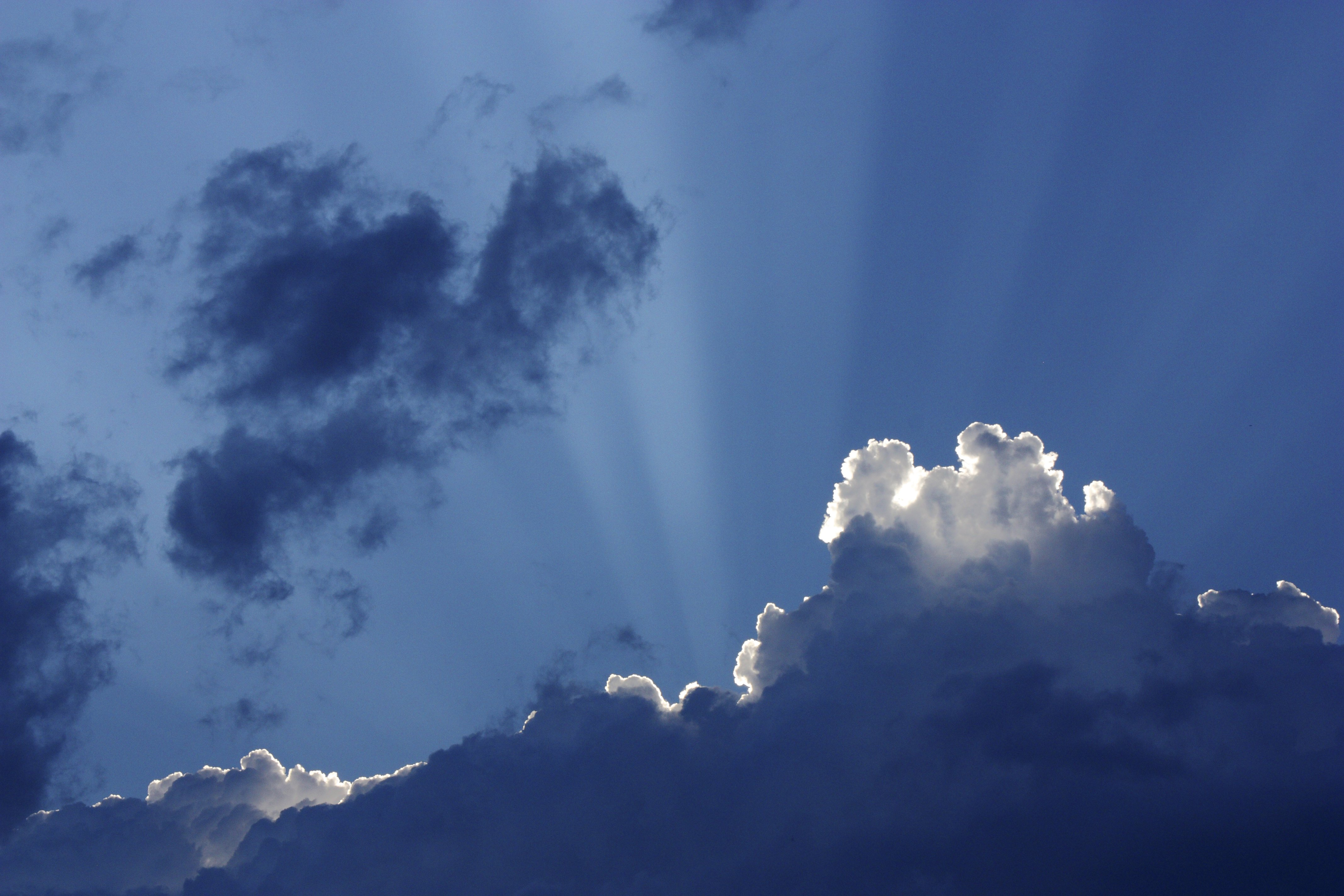
Sunbeam exhibiting Mie scattering instead of Tyndall scattering

When the day's sky is overcast, sunlight passes through the turbidity layer of the clouds, resulting in scattered, diffuse light on the ground (sunbeam). This exhibits Mie scattering instead of Tyndall scattering because the cloud droplets are larger than the wavelength of the light and scatters all colors approximately equally. Similarly, the term Tyndall effect is incorrectly applied to light scattering by large, macroscopic dust particles in the air as due to their large size, they do not exhibit Tyndall scattering.

When the daytime sky is cloudless, the sky's color is blue due to Rayleigh scattering instead of Tyndall scattering. The primary scattering agents in the atmosphere are air molecules such as nitrogen and oxygen, and the characteristic dimensions of these molecules are much smaller than the wavelengths of visible light, thereby satisfying the conditions under which Rayleigh scattering is applicable.

Another manifestation of Tyndall scattering can be seen in the blue colours exhibited by glacial meltwater on account of the suspended particles preferentially back scattering shorter wavelengths of the visible spectrum while absorbing longer wavelengths. Milky white rock flour combined with the blue tint caused by the Tyndall effect produces the characteristic “turquoise blue” often seen in meltwater streams. The actual shade of blue will ultimately be determined by the relative abundance of particulates capable of producing Tyndall scattering across the entire range of particle sizes suspended in the meltwater (see table below).

Comparison between the three main scattering processes undergone by visible light
Scattering process	Particle type	Particle size	Resulting effect
Rayleigh scattering	Air molecule (N_{2} and O_{2})	< 1 nanometer	Sky blue hue
Tyndall scattering	Colloidal particles in suspension	50 nm to 1 μm	Blue scattered light
Mie scattering	Larger air dust, or cloud droplets	> 1 micrometer	All colors equally scattered

=== Comparison with Rayleigh scattering ===
Rayleigh scattering is defined by a mathematical formula that requires the light-scattering particles to be far smaller than the wavelength of the light. For a dispersion of particles to qualify for the Rayleigh formula, the particle sizes need to be below roughly 40 nanometres (for visible light), and the particles may be individual molecules. Colloidal particles are bigger and are in the rough vicinity of the size of a wavelength of light. Tyndall scattering, i.e. colloidal particle scattering, is much more intense than Rayleigh scattering due to the bigger particle sizes involved. The importance of the particle size factor for intensity can be seen in the large exponent it has in the mathematical statement of the intensity of Rayleigh scattering. If the colloid particles are spheroid, Tyndall scattering can be mathematically analyzed in terms of Mie theory, which admits particle sizes in the rough vicinity of the wavelength of light. Light scattering by particles of complex shape are described by the T-matrix method.

== Gallery ==
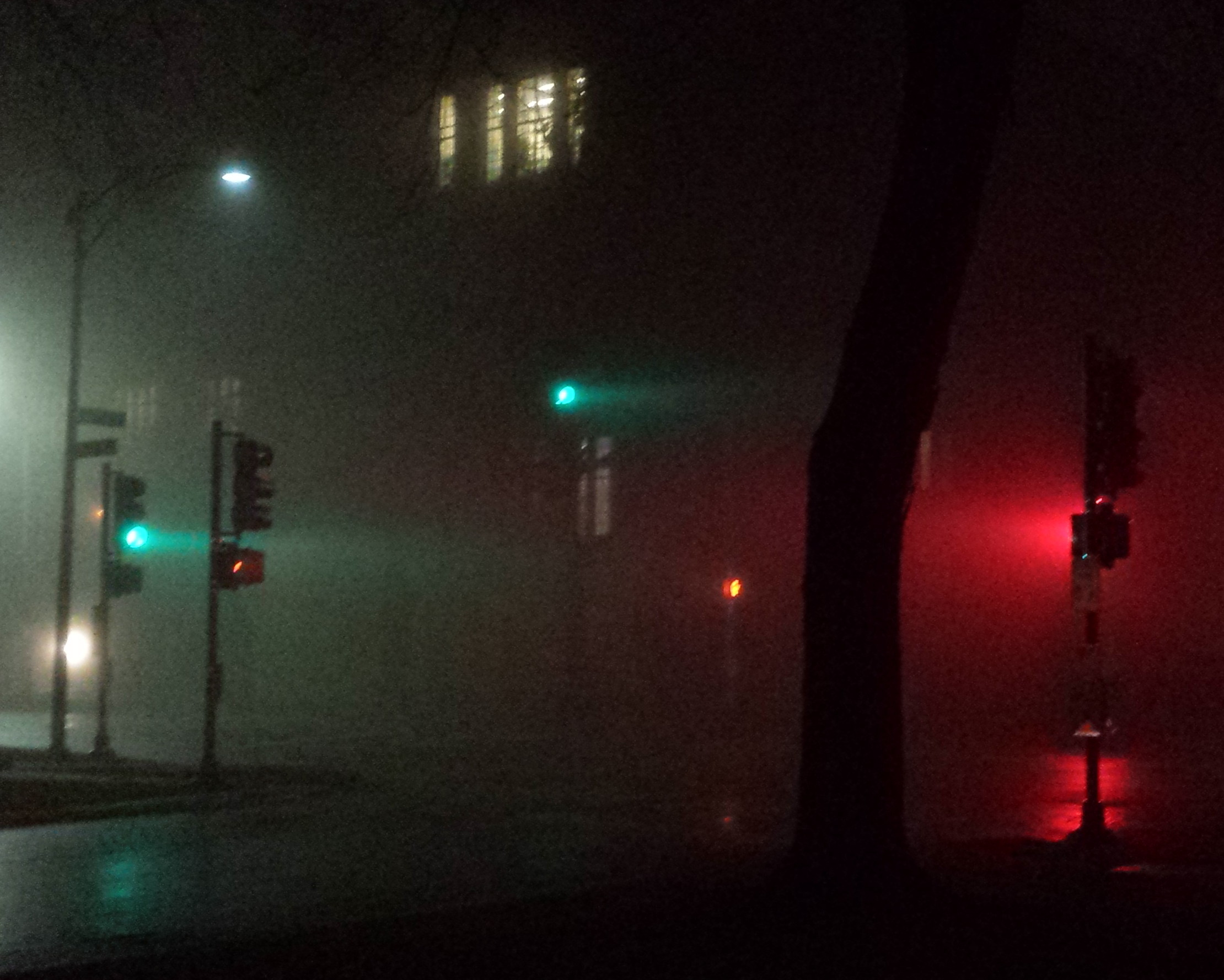
Fog scattering traffic light

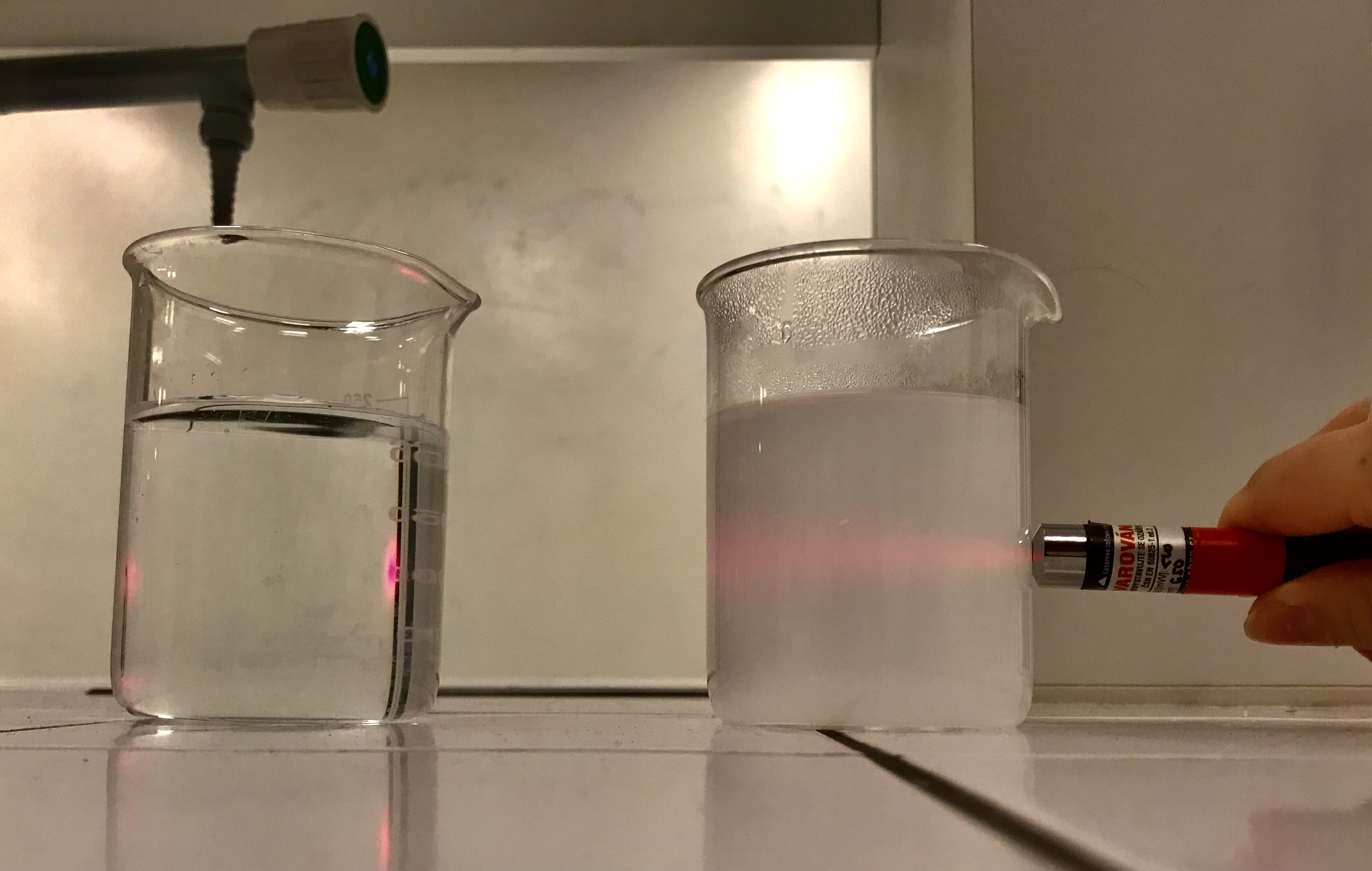
The colloid on the right shows Tyndall effect while the solution does not.

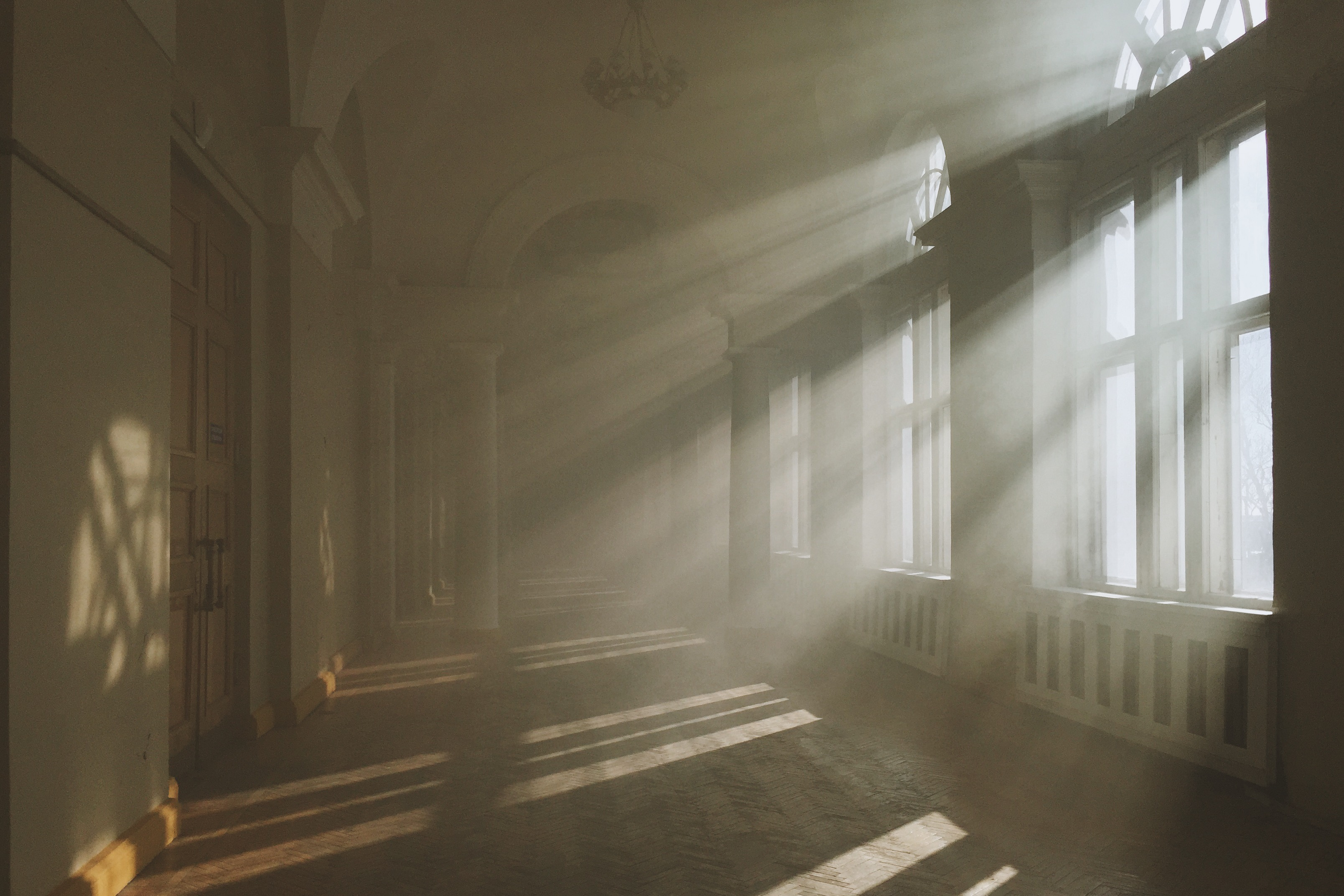
Dust in the air exhibiting Mie scattering rather than Tyndall scattering

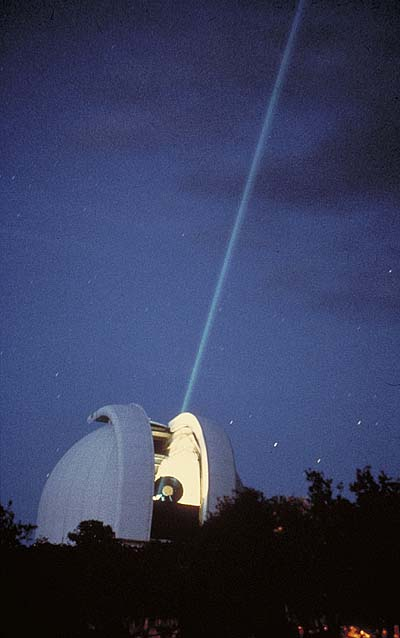
The path of the laser from the observatory becomes visible due to Tyndall effect.

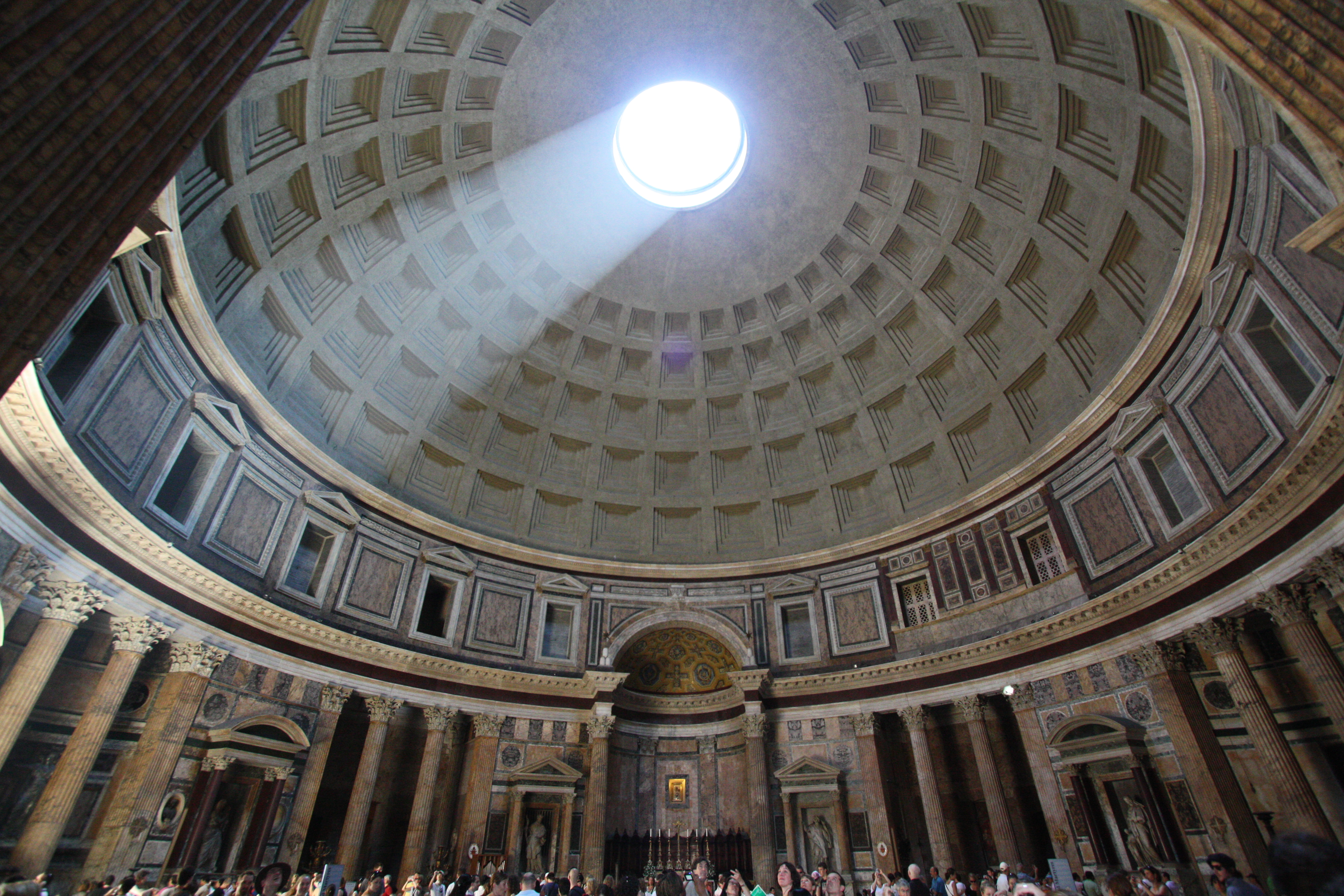
Tyndall effect produced by the oculus in the top of the Pantheon's dome, Rome. The oculus is the only source of light inside the Pantheon.

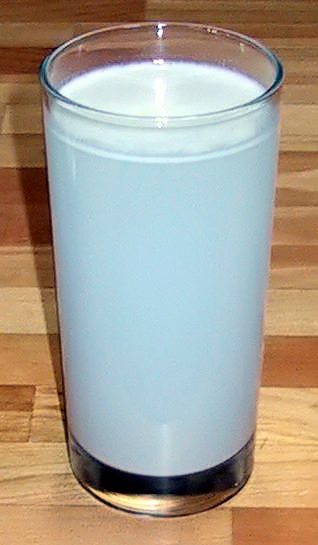
Flour suspended in water appears to be blue as only scattered light reaches the eyes and blue light is scattered by the flour particles more than red light.

Light scattering inside a church

== See also ==
- Light scattering
- Transparency and translucency
- Ultramicroscope
