= Schubert's compositions for violin and piano =

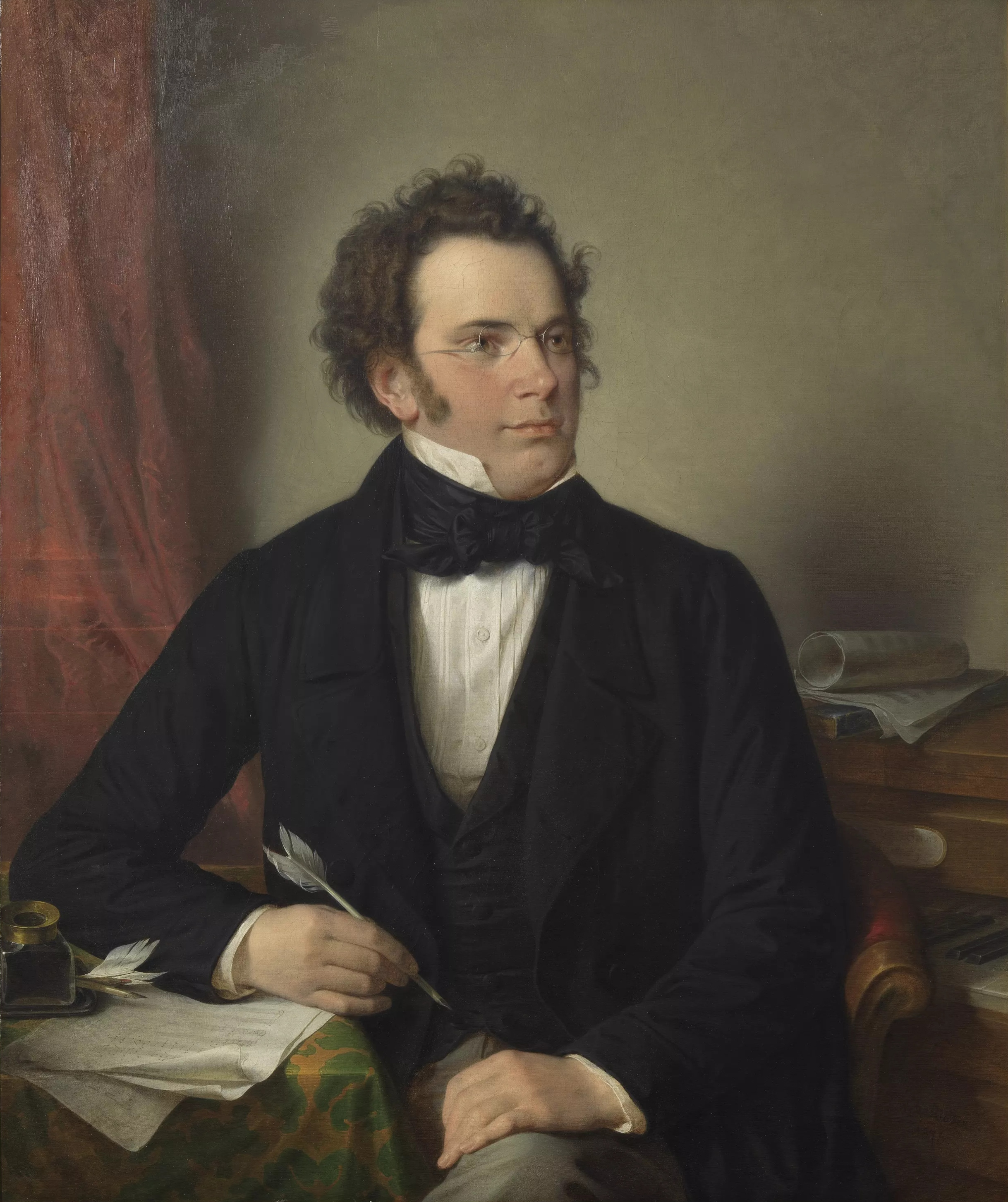
1875 portrait of Franz Schubert, after an 1825 original by Wilhelm August Rider

From March 1816 to August 1817, Franz Schubert composed four violin sonatas. All four were published after the composer's death: the first three, D 384, 385 and 408, as Sonatinas in 1836 (Op. posth. 137), and the last one, D 574, as Duo in 1851 (Op. posth. 162). Schubert composed two more pieces for violin and piano, in October 1826 and December 1827 respectively: a Rondo, D 895, which was published during the composer's lifetime (Op. 70), and a Fantasy, D 934, which was premiered in January 1828, less than a year before the composer's death.

The 1816–1817 sonatas breathe an intimate atmosphere, requiring no virtuoso bravura from their performers, while the 1826–1827 pieces, composed for the Bohemian violinist Josef Slavík, have been characterized as more demanding, also for the pianist, and have a more extroverted character.

== Sonatas (1816–1817) ==
Sonatas of 1816–1817
D 384: Sonat(in)a in D major, Op. 137 No. 1

D 385: Sonat(in)a in A minor, Op. 137 No. 2

D 408: Sonat(in)a in G minor, Op. 137 No. 3

D 574: Sonata (Duo) in A major
Performed by Dénes Zsigmondy (violin) and Anneliese Nissen (piano)

Schubert was an accomplished violinist and had already extensively composed for violin, including over a dozen string quartets, by the time he started to write violin sonatas at age 19.

=== Sonatinas Op. 137 ===
The compositions for violin and piano D 384, 385 and 408 were named Sonata in Schubert's autographs. They were named Sonatina when published posthumously as Op. 137 in 1836. Since these works are modest in size—rather to be compared to Mozart's violin sonatas than to Beethoven's—the "Sonatina" diminutive stuck to them.

==== No. 1 in D major, D 384 ====
Schubert wrote "März 1816" (March 1816) on the autograph score of his Sonata for Violin and Piano in D major (D 384). The sonata has three movements:

1. Allegro molto
2. Andante
3. Allegro vivace

==== No. 2 in A minor, D 385 ====
Titled "Sonata II" and dated March 1816 in the autograph, the Sonata for Violin and Piano in A minor (D 385) has four movements:

1. Allegro moderato
2. Andante
3. Menuetto: Allegro
4. Allegro

==== No. 3 in G minor, D 408 ====
Schubert dated the Sonata for Violin and Piano in G minor (D 408) April 1816 in the autograph, and titled it "Sonata III". The sonata has four movements:

1. Allegro giusto
2. Andante
3. Menuetto: Allegro vivace
4. Allegro moderato

=== Duo in A major, D 574 ===
There is no extant autograph of the Sonata for Violin and Piano in A major, D 574, but there is an early manuscript copy titling the work as Sonate, and indicating its time of composition as August 1817. It was named Duo when published as Op. 162 in 1851. It has four movements:

1. Allegro moderato
2. Scherzo: Presto
3. Andantino
4. Allegro vivace

== Rondo (1826) and Fantasy (1827) ==
D 895: Rondo brillant in B minor

D 934: Fantasy in C major
Performed by Dénes Zsigmondy (violin) and Anneliese Nissen (piano)

Both the Rondo in B minor, D 895, and the Fantasy in C major, D 934, were apparently composed for the Czech violist Josef Slavík and the pianist Carl Maria von Bocklet: they performed these works before Schubert's death in November 1828.

=== Rondeau brillant, D 895 ===
In his autograph, dated October 1826, Schubert indicated D 895 as "Rondo". It was published in April 1827 by Artaria as the composer's Op. 70, titled Rondeau brillant. The composition is in B minor and has two sections: an introductory Andante followed by an Allegro in sonata rondo form.

=== Fantasy in C major, D 934 ===
For the Fantasy in C major, D 934, which was composed in December 1827, the name given by Schubert, Fantaisie, corresponds with that of its first publication in 1850 as Op. 159. The work is in one movement with several sections:

1. Andante molto
2. Allegretto
3. Andantino
  This section consists of four variations on a variant of the tune of Schubert's lied "Sei mir gegrüßt", D 741.
4. Allegro vivace

== Reception ==
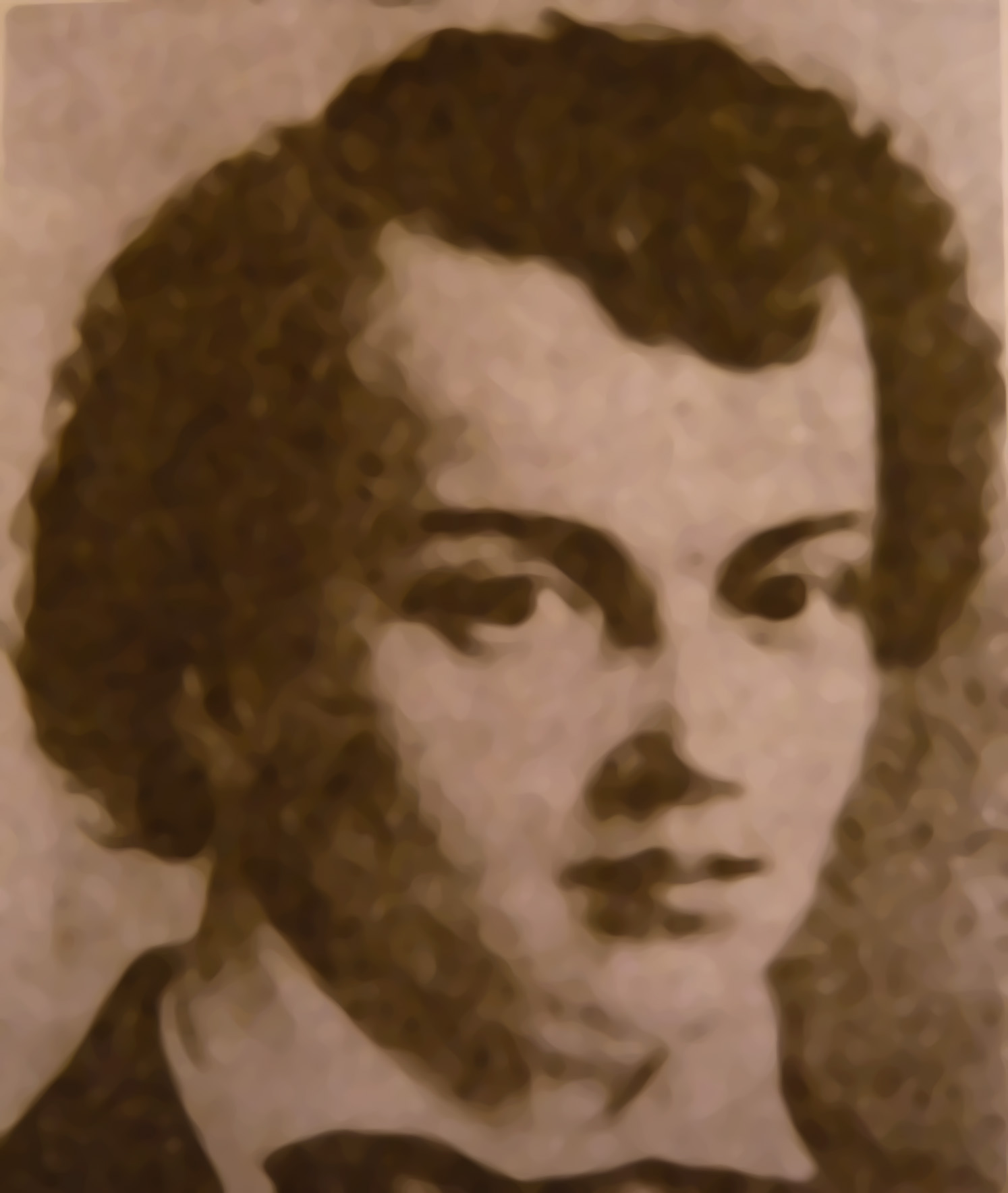
Josef Slavík, the violinist who premiered both the Rondo D 895 and the Fantasy D 934

The Rondo in B minor, D 895, was performed by Josef Slavík and Carl Maria von Bocklet at music publisher Domenico Artaria's, in Schubert's presence, probably early 1827. At the time, the work was well received. According to a note written by Joseph Joachim in October 1857, he had performed this work with Marie Wieck. Documented 19th-century public performances include:

- 20 January 1828: Fantasy, D 934, premiered by Josef Slavík and Carl Maria von Bocklet in the Landhaussaal in Vienna. A contemporary critic was dismissive about the work for its length.
- 21 October 1862 and 2 December 1867: Rondo Brillant, Op. 70, in the Gewandhaus (Leipzig). With the piano part orchestrated by Ferdinand David, this piece was performed in the same venue on New Year's Day 1872.
- 7 February 1864: Fantasie, Op. 159, in the Gewandhaus (Leipzig).
- 3 March 1864: first public performance of Duo, Op. 162, in the Musikverein (Vienna).

The publication of Schubert's works for violin and piano had started in 1827 and was completed quarter of a century later. The pieces were recorded in the 20th and 21st century.

=== Publication ===
The 19th-century collected edition published Schubert's compositions for piano and one other instrument in its eighth series in 1886, edited by Ignaz Brüll. The first six pieces in that volume were Schubert's compositions for violin and piano, all of which had been published before:

- 1827, published by Artaria & Co.: Rondeau Brillant, Op. 70 (D 895)
- 1836, published by Diabelli & Co.: Drei Sonatinen für Piano-Forte und Violine, Op. posth. 137 (D 384, 385 and 408)
- 1850, published by Diabelli & Co.: Fantasie, Op. posth. 159 (D 934)
- 1851, published by Diabelli & Co.: Duo (en La) pour Piano et Violon, Op. posth. 162 (D 574)

Series VI, Volume 8 of the New Schubert Edition, published in 1970, contained the same works as series VIII of the 19th-century collected edition, but presented them in chronological order of composition.

=== Recordings ===
Recordings grouping all six of Schubert's compositions for violin and piano:

- 1955: Schubert: Complete Works for Violin & Piano. Johanna Martzy (violin) and Jean Antonietti (piano). Testament SBT2 1468 (2 CD box).
- 1964: Schubert: Complete Music for Violin and Piano. György Pauk (violin) and Peter Frankl (piano). Brilliant Classics 95115 (2 CD box).
- 1984: Schubert: Complete Works for Violin and Piano. Gérard Poulet (violin) and Noël Lee (piano). Arion ARN 268006 (2 CD box).
- 1988: Schubert: 3 Sonatinas, Op. posth. 137; Duo, Op. 162; Rondo, Op. 70; Fantaisie, Op. posth. 159. Isaac Stern (violin) and Daniel Barenboim (piano). Sony Classical S2K 44504 (2 CD box). Re-issued in Daniel Barenboim: A Retrospective (Sony Classical 889853936328, box with 43 CDs and 3 DVDs).
- 1988–1989: Schubert: Die Kammermusik für Violine. Edith Peinemann (violin) and Leonard Hokanson (piano). Bayer BR 100067 CD (2 CD box).
- 1989: Schubert: The Complete Works for Violin and Piano. Jaime Laredo (violin) and Stephanie Brown (piano). Brilliant Classics 92275 (2 CD box).
- 1990–1991: Schubert: Violin Works. Gidon Kremer (violin), Oleg Maisenberg (piano: Op. 137; 1991) and Valery Afanassiev (piano: D 574, 895 and 934; 1990). Deutsche Grammophon 0289 469 8372 0 (in 4 CD box).
- 2009: Schubert: Complete Works for Violin and Piano. Julia Fischer (violin) and Martin Helmchen (piano). Pentatone.
- 2012: Schubert: Complete Works for Violin and Piano. Alina Ibragimova (violin) and Cédric Tiberghien (piano). Hyperion CDA67911/2 (2 CD box).
- 2014: Schubert: Chamber Works. Tasmin Little (violin) and Piers Lane (piano). Chandos CHAN 10850(2) (2 CD box).

== See also ==
- List of compositions by Franz Schubert

== Sources ==
- Deutsch, Otto Erich; et al. (Walther Dürr, Arnold Feil, Christa Landon and Werner Aderhold) (1978). Franz Schubert: Thematisches Verzeichnis seiner Werke in chronologischer Folge. New Schubert Edition (in German). Kassel: Bärenreiter. ISBN 9783761805718. ISMN 9790006305148 – via Internet Archive. Series VIII (Supplement), Vol. 4
