= Protective colloid =

Lyophilic colloid preventing precipitation

A protective colloid is a lyophilic colloid that when present in small quantities keeps lyophobic colloids from precipitating under the coagulating action of electrolytes.

== Need for protective colloids ==
When a small amount of hydrophilic colloid is added to hydrophobic colloids it may coagulate the latter. This is due to neutralisation of the charge on the hydrophobic colloidal particles. However, the addition of large amount of hydrophilic colloid increases the stability of the hydrophobic colloidal system. This is due to adsorption.

When lyophilic sols are added to lyophobic sols, depending on their sizes, either lyophobic sol is adsorbed in the surface of lyophilic sol or lyophilic sol is adsorbed on the surface of lyophobic sol. The layer of the protective colloid prevents direct collision between the hydrophobic colloidal particles and thus prevents coagulation.

== Examples ==
Lyophilic sols like starch and gelatin act as protective colloids.

== Measurement of protective action ==
For a comparative study Zsigmondy introduced a scale of protective action for different protective colloids in terms of gold number. The gold number is the weight in milligrams of a protective colloid which checks the coagulation of 10ml of a given gold sol on adding 1 ml of 10% sodium chloride.

Thus smaller the gold number, greater is the protective action. Gold numbers of some materials Gelatin 0.005-0.01 Albumin 0.1 Acacia 0.1-0.2 Sodium oleate 1-5 Tragacanth 2 [4]
