= Op. 159 =

In music, Op. 159 stands for Opus number 159. Compositions that are assigned this number include:

- Saint-Saëns – Hymne à la paix
- Schubert – Fantasy for violin and piano
- Wagner – Under the Double Eagle
