= Emil Zsigmondy =

Austrian physician and mountaineer (1861–1885)

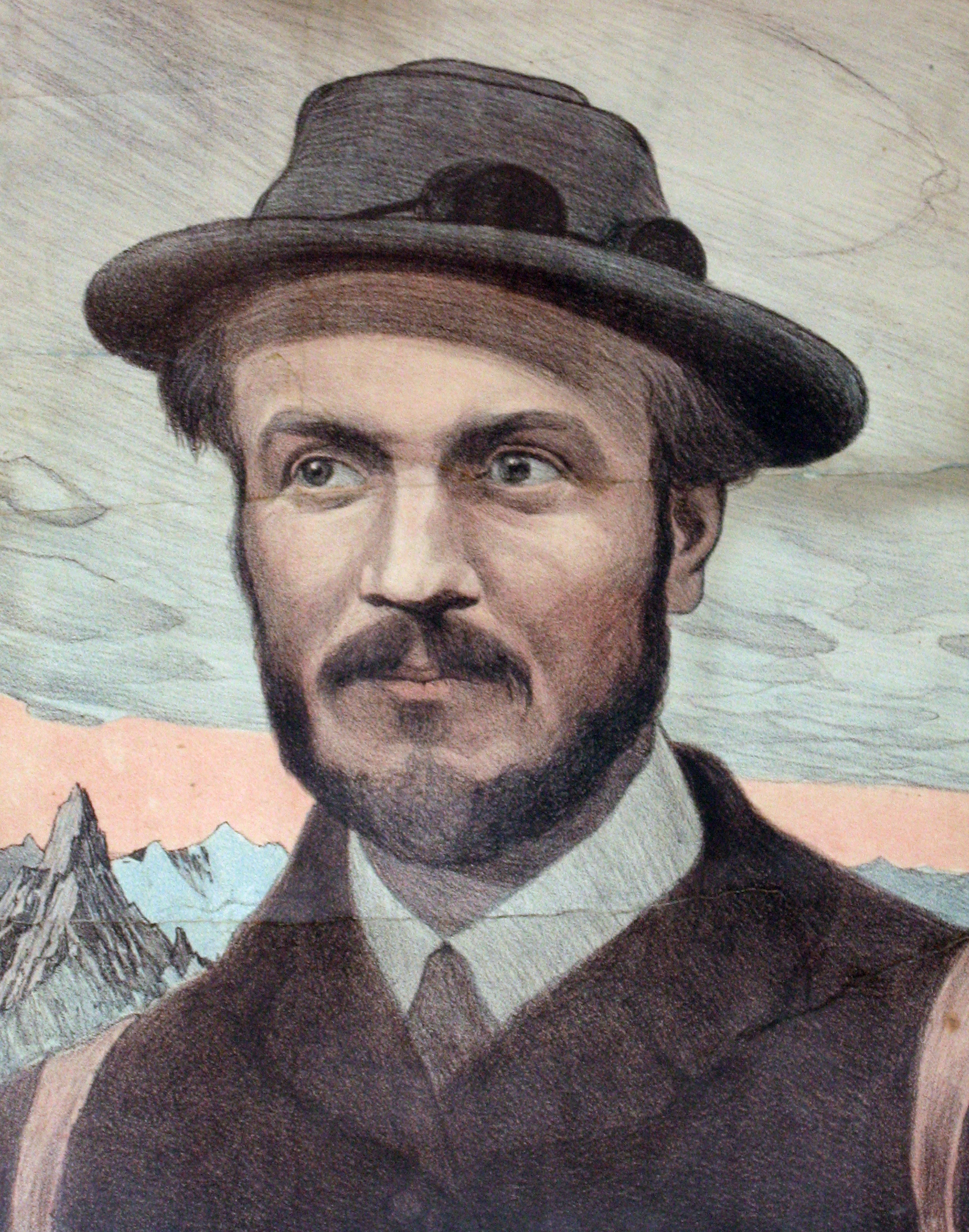
- Born: 11 August 1861; Vienna, Austrian Empire
- Died: 6 August 1885 (aged 23); South face of Meije, France
- Occupations: Physician, mountaineer

Emil Zsigmondy (11 August 1861 – 6 August 1885) was an Austrian medical doctor and mountaineer.

== Life ==
Zsigmondy's parents were Hungarians: Adolf Zsigmondy, born in Pozsony, and Irma von Szakmáry, born in Martonvásár. Zsigmondy was an excellent alpinist, known for the risky nature of many of his climbs. He began mountaineering as a teenager, climbing the Reisseck in Austria in a round trip of 26 hours with his brother, Otto Zsigmondy. By the late 1870s the two brothers were climbing without guides in the Zillertal Alps. In 1881, they climbed the Ortler from the Hochjoch.

Emil Zsigmondy was the friend and companion of Ludwig Purtscheller, the great pioneer of guideless Alpine climbing. Emil and Otto climbed with Purtscheller in 1882 and 1884, including an ascent without guides of the Marinelli Couloir on Monte Rosa and the first guideless traverse of the Matterhorn. Zsigmondy's outstanding achievements include the first ascent by the east arête of the 3,983 metres (13,068 ft) high Meije in the Massif des Écrins range, made by Zsigmondy, his brother Otto, and Purtscheller on 26 July 1885. A few days later he died on the same mountain. He was killed in an attempt to climb the south face of the Meije on 6 August 1885, probably as a result of his rope slipping off a rock. The face was only conquered in 1912 by the South Tyrolese climbers Angelo Dibona and Luigi Rizzi with the brothers Guido and Max Mayer. Emil Zsigmondy's grave is a few miles away from the accident site in the small cemetery of Saint-Christophe-en-Oisans in the Dauphiné Alps. He had graduated as a doctor of medicine in 1884, less than a year before his death.

American historian and mountaineer W. A. B. Coolidge would later write:

It is impossible, of course, to fix the precise date at which guideless climbing began to be abused. But no one can doubt that one of the first signs of the change in men's views was the tragic death of Emil Zsigmondy on the Meije in 1885 . . . there are limits even to human skill and human daring, and, in the opinion of the present writer, these were overstepped on that occasion.

Zsigmondy is commemorated by the Zsigmondyspitze in the Zillertal Alps, the Brèche Zsigmondy on the Meije (part of the route followed on the successful July 1885 climb), and the Zsigmondyhütte (Rifugio Zsigmondy Comici) in the Sexten Dolomites.

== Family ==
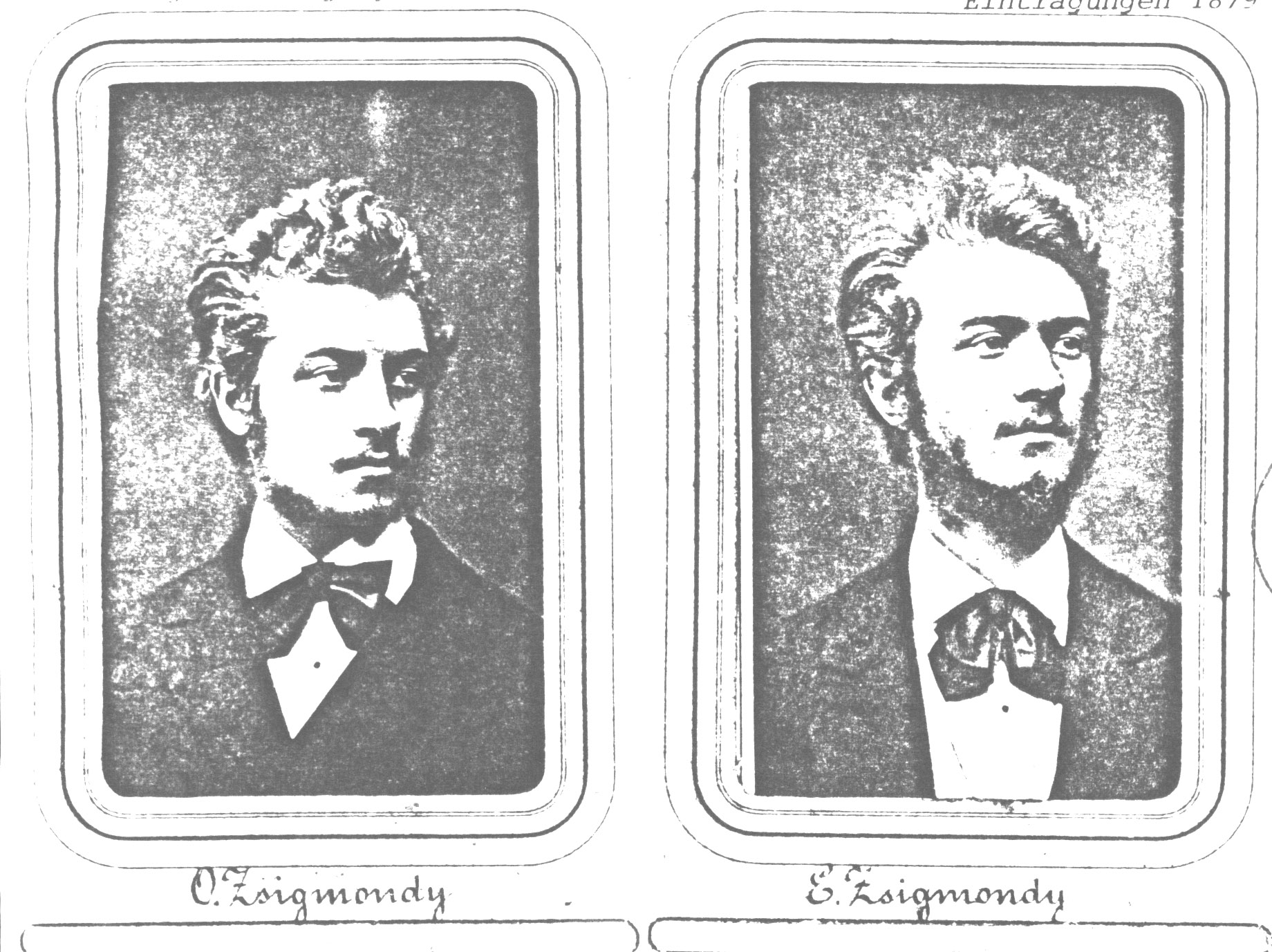
The brothers Otto (left) and Emil Zsigmondy in 1880

Emil Zsigmondy was the second of the four sons of Dr. Adolf Zsigmondy of Pressburg, a dentist of Hungarian origin, and Irma von Szakmáry, a poet from Martonvásár. His older brother, Otto, a dentist by profession, was also known as a mountaineer. His younger brother, Richard Adolf Zsigmondy, was a chemist and in 1925 received the Nobel Prize in Chemistry. The youngest of the four brothers, Karl Zsigmondy, was a mathematician; in number theory, Zsigmondy's theorem is named after him. He was a cousin of the architect Frigyes Schulek, whose mother was Auguszta Zsigmondy.

== Ascents ==
- 1879 - Ascent of Feldkopf (3,080 metres (10,100 ft), Zillertal) with Otto Zsigmondy, 25 July
- 1884 - First traverse of the Marmolada, of the Punta Rocca (3,309 metres (10,856 ft)) to the Punta Penia (3,342 metres (10,965 ft)) with Otto Zsigmondy and Ludwig Purtscheller
- 1884 - First ascent sans guide of Monte Civetta with Otto Zsigmondy, 5 August
- 1884 - First route of the southwest face of the Croda di Trafoi (Ortler) with Otto Zsigmondy, G. Geyer and J. Prohaska, 23 August
- 1884 - First ascent of the south face of the Bietschhorn (3,934 metres (12,907 ft)) with Otto Zsigmondy, Ludwig Purtscheller and Karl Schulz, 2 September
- 1885 - Ascent of Bec de l'Homme (3,454 metres (11,332 ft), Massif des Écrins) with Otto Zsigmondy, Ludwig Purtscheller and Karl Schulz
- 1885 - First ascent by the east arête of the Meije with Otto Zsigmondy and Ludwig Purtscheller, 26 and 27 July
- 1885 - Attempted ascent of the south face of the Meije with Otto Zsigmondy and Karl Schulz, 6 August

== Publications ==
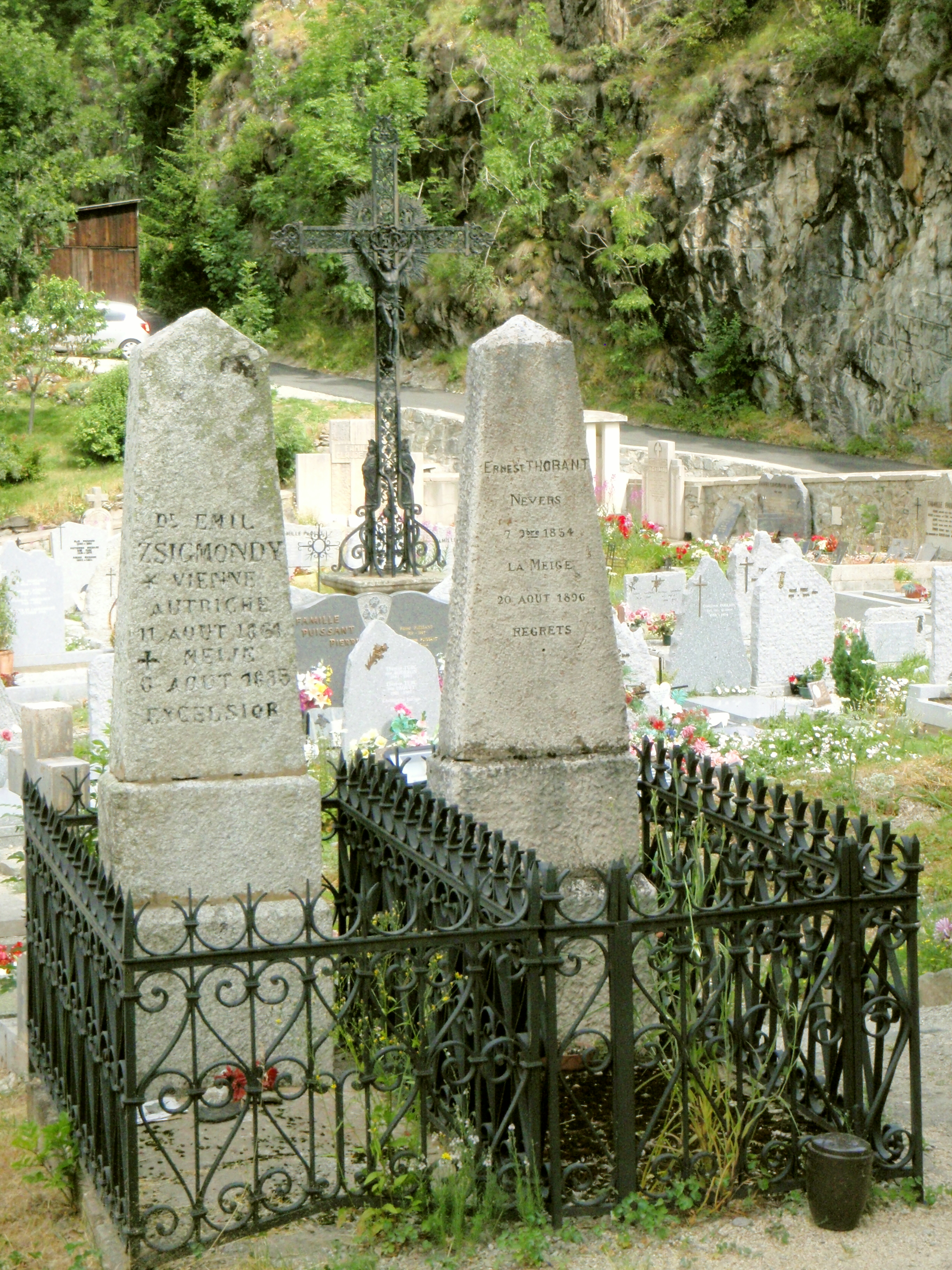
Zsigmondy's grave (left) in the cemetery of Saint-Christophe-en-Oisans.

- Die Gefahren der Alpen, Praktishe Winke für Bergsteiger (The Dangers of the Alps, Practical Hints for Climbers). Leipzig. 1885. (later editions continued by Wilhelm Paulcke and Helmut Dumler)
- Schulz, Karl, ed. (1889). Im Hochgebirge (In the High Mountains), Wanderungen von Dr. Emil Zsigmondy. Illustrated by E. T. Compton. Leipzig. (posthumous)
