= Gold number =

Concept in chemistry

The gold number is the minimum weight (in milligrams) of a protective colloid/lyophilic colloid required to prevent the coagulation of 10 ml of a standard hydro gold sol when 1 ml of a 10% sodium chloride solution is added to it. It was first used by Richard Adolf Zsigmondy in 1901.

An electrical double layer is normally present on the gold sol particles, resulting in electrostatic repulsion between the particles. The sodium chloride ions disrupt this electrical double layer, causing coagulation to occur.

The coagulation of gold sol results in an increase in particle size, indicated by a colour change from red to blue or purple. The higher the gold number, the lower the protective power of the colloid, because a greater amount of colloid is required to prevent coagulation.

The gold number of some colloids are given below.

Protective Colloid	Gold Number
Gelatin	0.005-.01
Haemoglobin	0.03-0.07
Egg Albumin	0.15-0.25
Potato Starch	20-25
Gum arabic	0.15-0.25
Caseinate	0.01-0.02
Sodium Oleate	1-5
Dextrin	125-150
