= Ultramicroscope =

Type of high-resolution microscope

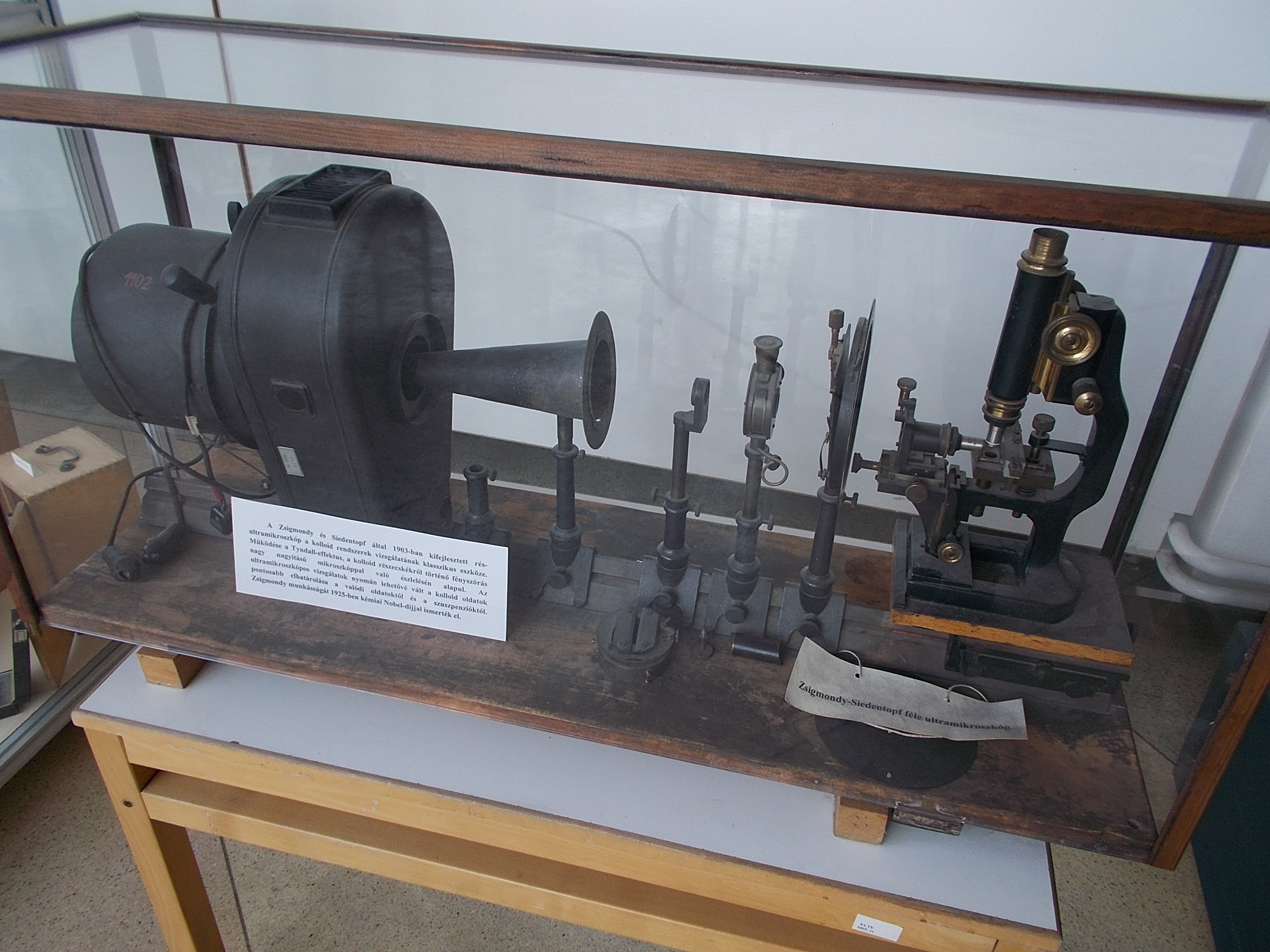
Ultramicroscope at Eötvös Loránd University, Hungary

An ultramicroscope is a microscope with a system that lights the object in a way that allows viewing of tiny particles via light scattering, and not light reflection or absorption. When the diameter of a particle is below or near the wavelength of visible light (around 500 nanometers), the particle cannot be seen in a light microscope with the usual methods of illumination. The ultra- in ultramicroscope refers to the ability to see objects whose diameter is shorter than the wavelength of visible light, on the model of the ultra- in ultraviolet.

== Synopsis ==
In the system, the particles to be observed are dispersed in a liquid or gas colloid (or less often in a coarser suspension). The colloid is placed in a light-absorbing, dark enclosure, and illuminated with a convergent beam of intense light entering from one side. Light hitting the colloid particles will be scattered. In discussions about light scattering, the converging beam is called a "Tyndall cone". The scene is viewed through an ordinary microscope placed at right angles to the direction of the lightbeam. Under the microscope, the individual particles will appear as small fuzzy spots of light moving irregularly. The spots are inherently fuzzy because light scattering produces fuzzier images than light reflection. The particles are in Brownian motion in most kinds of liquid and gas colloids, which causes the movement of the spots. The ultramicroscope system can also be used to observe tiny nontransparent particles dispersed in a transparent solid or gel.

Ultramicroscopes have been used for general observation of aerosols and colloids, in studying Brownian motion, in observing ionization tracks in cloud chambers, and in studying biological ultrastructure.

== History ==
In 1902, the ultramicroscope was developed by Richard Adolf Zsigmondy (1865–1929) and Henry Siedentopf (1872–1940), working for Carl Zeiss AG. Applying bright sunlight for illumination they were able to determine the size of 4 nm small nanoparticles in cranberry glass. Zsigmondy further improved the ultramicroscope and presented the immersion ultramicroscope in 1912, allowing the observation of suspended nanoparticles in defined fluidic volumes. In 1925, he was awarded the Nobel Prize in Chemistry for his research on colloids and the ultramicroscope.

Later the development of electron microscopes provided additional ways to see objects too small for light microscopy.

== See also ==
- Dark-field microscopy, a different technique that leverages light scattering against a dark background
- Light sheet fluorescence microscopy
