= Carmichael's theorem =

On prime divisors in Fibonacci and Lucas sequences

In number theory, Carmichael's theorem, named after the American mathematician R. D. Carmichael, states that, for any nondegenerate Lucas sequence of the first kind U_{n}(P, Q) with relatively prime parameters P, Q and positive discriminant, an element U_{n} with n ≠ 1, 2, 6 has at least one prime divisor that does not divide any earlier one except the 12th Fibonacci number F(12) = U_{12}(1, −1) = 144 and its equivalent U_{12}(−1, −1) = −144.

In particular, for n greater than 12, the nth Fibonacci number F(n) has at least one prime divisor that does not divide any earlier Fibonacci number.

Carmichael (1913, Theorem 21) proved this theorem. Recently, Yabuta (2001) gave a simple proof. Bilu, Hanrot, Voutier and Mignotte (2001) extended it to the case of negative discriminants (where it is true for all n > 30).

== Statement ==
Given two relatively prime integers P and Q, such that $D=P^2-4Q>0$ and PQ ≠ 0, let U_{n}(P, Q) be the Lucas sequence of the first kind defined by

$$\begin{align}
U_0(P,Q)&=0, \\
U_1(P,Q)&=1, \\
U_n(P,Q)&=P\cdot U_{n-1}(P,Q)-Q\cdot U_{n-2}(P,Q) \qquad\mbox{  for }n>1.
\end{align}$$

Then, for n ≠ 1, 2, 6, U_{n}(P, Q) has at least one prime divisor that does not divide any U_{m}(P, Q) with m < n, except U_{12}(±1, −1) = ±F(12) = ±144. Such a prime p is called a characteristic factor or a primitive prime divisor of U_{n}(P, Q). Indeed, Carmichael showed a slightly stronger theorem: For n ≠ 1, 2, 6, U_{n}(P, Q) has at least one primitive prime divisor not dividing D except U_{3}(±1, −2) = 3, U_{5}(±1, −1) = F(5) = 5, or U_{12}(1, −1) = −U_{12}(−1, −1) = F(12) = 144.

In Carmichael's theorem, D should be greater than 0; thus the cases U_{13}(1, 2), U_{18}(1, 2) and U_{30}(1, 2), etc. are not included, since in this case D = −7 < 0.

== Fibonacci and Pell cases ==
The only exceptions in Fibonacci case for n up to 12 are:

F(1) = 1 and F(2) = 1, which have no prime divisors
F(6) = 8, whose only prime divisor is 2 (which is F(3))
F(12) = 144, whose only prime divisors are 2 (which is F(3)) and 3 (which is F(4))

The smallest primitive prime divisor of F(n) are

1, 1, 2, 3, 5, 1, 13, 7, 17, 11, 89, 1, 233, 29, 61, 47, 1597, 19, 37, 41, 421, 199, 28657, 23, 3001, 521, 53, 281, 514229, 31, 557, 2207, 19801, 3571, 141961, 107, 73, 9349, 135721, 2161, 2789, 211, 433494437, 43, 109441, ... (sequence A001578 in the OEIS)

Carmichael's theorem says that every Fibonacci number, apart from the exceptions listed above, has at least one primitive prime divisor.

If n > 1, then the nth Pell number has at least one prime divisor that does not divide any earlier Pell number. The smallest primitive prime divisor of nth Pell number are

1, 2, 5, 3, 29, 7, 13, 17, 197, 41, 5741, 11, 33461, 239, 269, 577, 137, 199, 37, 19, 45697, 23, 229, 1153, 1549, 79, 53, 113, 44560482149, 31, 61, 665857, 52734529, 103, 1800193921, 73, 593, 9369319, 389, 241, ... (sequence A246556 in the OEIS)

== See also ==
- Zsigmondy's theorem
