= Violin Sonata in A major, D 574 (Schubert) =

Composition for violin and piano by Franz Schubert

I. Allegro moderato

II. Scherzo: Presto

III. Andantino

IV. Allegro vivace
All performed by Dénes Zsigmondy (violin) and Anneliese Nissen (piano)

The Violin Sonata No. 4 (also known as the Duo or Grand Duo) in A major, Op. posth. 162, D 574, for violin and piano by Franz Schubert was composed in 1817. This sonata, composed one year after his first three violin sonatas, was a much more individual work, showing neither the influence of Mozart, as in these previous works, nor of Rossini, as in the contemporaneous 6th Symphony.

== Structure ==
The Sonata has four movements:

1. Allegro moderato (A major), sonata form
2. Scherzo: Presto (E major), with C major trio
3. Andantino (C major), loose ternary form
4. Allegro vivace’' (A major), sonata form

== Sources ==
- Newbould, Brian (2015). Schubert: Chamber Works (PDF) (CD). Chandos Records. CH10850.
- Parloff, Michael (2009). "Program Note - Schubert: Duo Sonata in A, Op. 162, D. 574, for violin and piano". Parlance Chamber Concerts.
- Wigmore, Richard (2013). Schubert: Complete works for Violin and Piano (PDF) (CD). Hyperion Records. CDA67911/2.
