= Karl Zsigmondy =

Austrian mathematician (1867–1925)

- Karl Zsigmondy
- Born: 27 March 1867; Vienna, Austrian Empire
- Died: 14 October 1925 (aged 58); Vienna, Austria
- Education: University of Vienna
- Known for: Zsigmondy's theorem
- Scientific career
- Fields: Mathematics
- Workplaces: University of Vienna

Karl Zsigmondy (Hungarian pronunciation: [ˈʒiɡmondi]; 27 March 1867 – 14 October 1925) was an Austro-Hungarian mathematician. He was a son of Adolf Zsigmondy from Pozsony, Kingdom of Hungary (now Bratislava, Slovakia) and his mother was Irma von Szakmáry of Martonvásár, Kingdom of Hungary.

He studied (1886–1890) and worked (1894–1925) at the University of Vienna. After his PhD, in 1890, he studied at the University of Berlin, University of Göttingen and at the Sorbonne in Paris, but came back to Vienna in 1894. He discovered Zsigmondy's theorem in 1892.

He was the brother of the mountain climber Emil Zsigmondy and the Nobel Laureate chemist Richard Adolf Zsigmondy.
