= Adolf Zsigmondy =

Hungarian-born dentist

Dr. Adolf Zsigmondy, a.k.a. Adolph Zsigmondy (24 April 1816 in Pozsony (German: Pressburg), Kingdom of Hungary – 23 June 1880 in Vienna, Austria-Hungary) was a dentist of Hungarian origin who lived in Vienna. He is best known for inventing the idea of charting teeth on the Zsigmondy-cross (named after him). This is the basis of the presently used marking method recommended by the FDI.

He was also the first to describe the contact and wear of the approximal side of the teeth. He continued to develop the cohesive gold fillings.

His eldest son, Ottó Zsigmondy, was also a dentist. His more limited professional field of research was the preserving dentistry. He used sodium-superoxide for widening the root canal and he made permanent fillings of black hard gutta percha. On the basis of observations carried out on himself he described the two-phase or temporal mastication called after him. He was also much engaged with professional politics, in his publications he strove for recognition of dentistry as an organic part of medical science.

Adolf Zsigmondy's second son, Emil Zsigmondy, was a physician. Both Ottó and Emil Zsigmondy were well-known mountaineers; they took part in the first climb of the Meije by the east arête in July 1885, but Emil was killed on another attempted climb of the Meije the following month. Adolf Zsigmondy's third son, Richard Adolf Zsigmondy, won the Nobel Prize in Chemistry in 1925. His fourth son, Karl Zsigmondy, was a mathematician, after whom Zsigmondy's theorem is named.
