= Henry Siedentopf =

German physicist

Henry Friedrich Wilhelm Siedentopf (22 September 1872 in Bremen – 8 May 1940 in Jena) was a German physicist and pioneer of microscopy.

== Biography ==
Siedentopf worked in Carl Zeiss company from 1899 to 1938. In 1907 he was nominated as the head of the microscopy department.

In 1902 the ultramicroscope was developed by Richard Adolf Zsigmondy (1865–1929) and Siedentopf, working for Carl Zeiss AG. The ultramicroscope was suitable for the determination of small particles and became the most important instrument of colloid research in colloid chemistry. In 1925, Zsigmondy received the Nobel Prize for Chemistry also for this work.

From 1919 till 1940, he was a. o. Professor for microscopy at the University of Jena. He also worked on the development of micro photography and slow motion and fast motion in the cinephotomicrography. In 1908, together with August Köhler, he invented the fluorescence microscope. In 1930 he was elected a member of the German National Academy of Sciences Leopoldina.

Richard Adolf Zsigmondy relates in his Nobel lecture that Siedentopf built the paraboloid condenser and the cardioid condenser.
