= Fantasy for violin and piano (Schubert) =

1827 composition by Franz Schubert

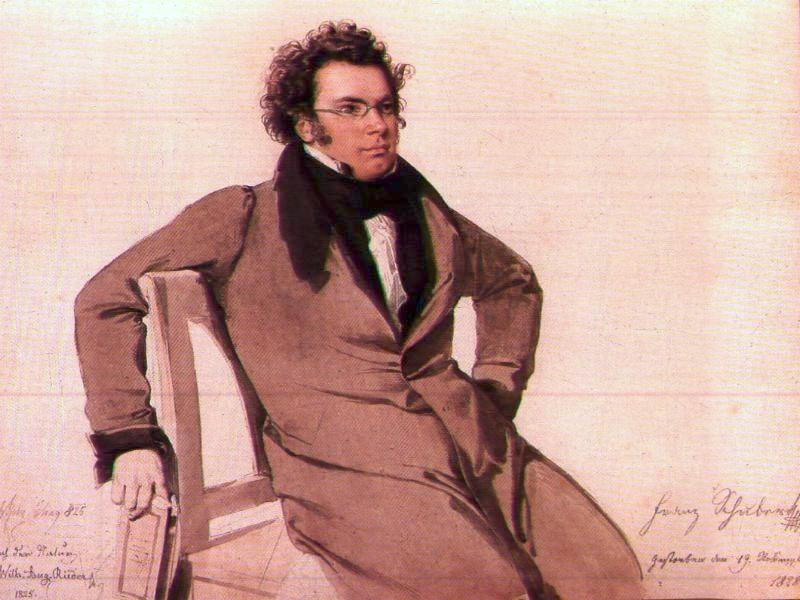
Watercolour of Franz Schubert by Wilhelm August Rieder (1825)

Franz Schubert composed his Fantasy (German: Fantasie; French: Fantaisie) in C major for violin and piano, Op. posth. 159, D 934, in December 1827. It was the last of his compositions for violin and piano, and was premiered in January 1828 by the violinist Josef Slavik and the pianist Carl Maria von Bocklet at the Landhaussaal in Vienna.

The difficult work was "calculated to display Slavík's virtuoso [violin] technique" and is demanding for both instruments. According to pianist Nikolai Lugansky, the Fantasy "is the most difficult music ever written for the piano", and "more difficult than all of Rachmaninov’s [piano] concertos put together".

A typical performance lasts around 25 minutes.

== Structure ==
Fantasy in C major, D 934
Performed by Dénes Zsigmondy (violin) and Anneliese Nissen (piano)

The work is in seven sections/movements:

1. Andante molto (C major, 6/8 time)
2. Allegretto (A minor, 2/4 time)
3. Tema e Variazioni — Andantino-Adagio (A♭ major, 3/4 time)
4. Tempo I (C major, 6/8 time)
5. Allegro vivace (C major, cut time)
6. Allegretto (A♭ major, 3/4 time)
7. Presto (C major, time)

The third movement, Andantino, is a reworking of Schubert's earlier song "Sei mir gegrüßt" (D 741, 1821–22), formatted as a theme and variations.
