= Richard Adolf Zsigmondy =

Austrian-born chemist (1865–1929)

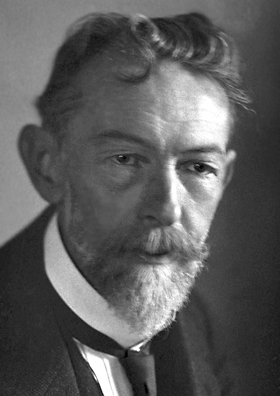
- Born: 1 April 1865; Vienna, Austrian Empire
- Died: 23 September 1929 (aged 64); Göttingen, Germany
- Education: Technical University of Vienna; Ludwig-Maximilians-Universität München
- Spouse: Laura Luise Müller
- Children: 2
- Parents: Adolf Zsidmondy (father); Irma von Szakmáry (mother)
- Relatives: Frigyes Schulek (cousin); Dénes Zsigmondy
- Awards: Nobel Prize in Chemistry (1925)
- Scientific career
- Fields: Chemistry
- Workplaces: University of Vienna; Technical University of Vienna; Ludwig-Maximilians-Universität München; Graz University of Technology; University of Göttingen
- Doctoral advisor: Wilhelm von Miller

Richard Adolf Zsigmondy (Hungarian: Zsigmondy Richárd Adolf; 1 April 1865 – 23 September 1929) was an Austrian-born chemist. He was known for his research in colloids, for which he was awarded the Nobel Prize in Chemistry in 1925, as well as for co-inventing the slit-ultramicroscope, and different membrane filters. The crater Zsigmondy on the Moon is named in his honour.

== Biography ==
=== Early years ===
Zsigmondy was born in Vienna, Austrian Empire, to a Hungarian gentry family. His mother Irma Szakmáry, a poet born in Martonvásár, and his father, Adolf Zsigmondy Sr., a scientist from Pressburg (Pozsony, today's Bratislava) who invented several surgical instruments for use in dentistry. Zsigmondy family members were Lutherans. They originated from Johannes (Hungarian: János) Sigmondi (1686–1746, Bártfa, Kingdom of Hungary) and included teachers, priests and Hungarian freedom-fighters. Richard was raised by his mother after his father's early death in 1880, and received a comprehensive education. He enjoyed hobbies such as climbing and mountaineering with his siblings. His elder brothers, Otto (a dentist) and Emil (a physician), were well-known mountain climbers; his younger brother, Karl Zsigmondy, became a notable mathematician in Vienna. In high school, Richard developed an interest in natural science, especially in chemistry and physics, and experimented in his home laboratory.

He began his academic career at the University of Vienna Medical Faculty, but soon moved to the Technical University of Vienna, and later to the Ludwig-Maximilians-Universität München, to study chemistry under Wilhelm von Miller (1848–1899). At the Ludwig-Maximilians-Universität München, he conducted research on indene and received his PhD from the University of Erlangen in 1889.

=== Career ===
In 1885, Zsigmondy published his very first article as a joint publication with his Viennese professor Rudolf Benedikt on a method of determining glycerin. His 1887 article Neue Lüster und Farben auf Glas (about colours on glass) marked the beginning of a research area on which he would work for another 30 years. Zsigmondy left organic chemistry to join the physics group of August Kundt at the Friedrich Wilhelm University of Berlin.

In July 1892, Zsigmondy held a colloquium at Graz University of Technology assessed among others by Albert von Ettingshausen and Friedrich Emich in order to qualify as assistant professor. There he also completed his habilitation in 1893. Because of his knowledge about glass and its colouring, in 1897 the Schott Glass factory offered him a job which he accepted. He invented the Jenaer Milchglas and conducted some research on the red Ruby glass. Lecturing activities in Graz were documented until 1899.

Zsigmondy left Schott Glass in 1900, but remained in Jena as private lecturer to conduct his research. Together with the optical instrument manufacturer Zeiss, he developed the slit ultramicroscope. His scientific career continued in 1908 at the University of Göttingen, where he stayed for the rest of his professional career as professor of inorganic chemistry. In 1925, Zsigmondy received the Nobel Prize for Chemistry for his work on colloids and the methods he used, such as the ultramicroscope upon which based his investigation on the Purple of Cassius.

Before Zsigmondy finished his PhD thesis in organic chemistry, he published research on colouring glass with silver salts and dissolved silver particles, which he recovered by dissolving the glass in hydrofluoric acid.

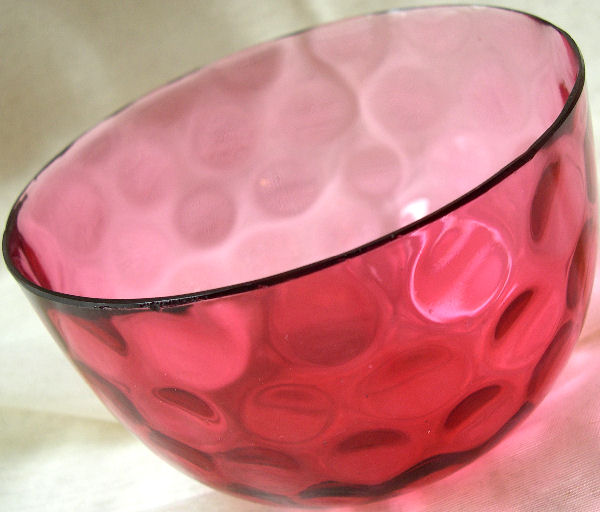
Vintage cranberry glass bowl

During his stay in Graz, Zsigmondy accomplished his most notable research work, on the chemistry of colloids. The exact mechanism which yields the red colour of the Cranberry or Ruby glass was a result of his studies of colloids.

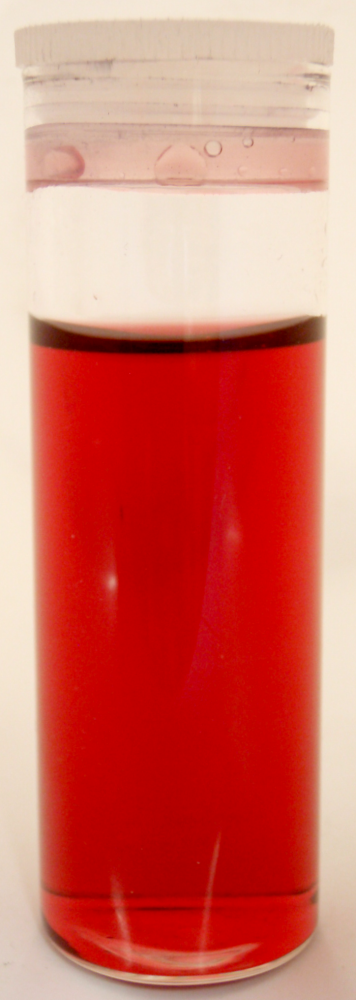
Aqueous colloidal gold.

In later years he worked on gold hydrosols and used them to characterize protein solutions. While in Jena, he developed the slit ultramicroscope together with Henry Siedentopf. After moving to Göttingen, Zsigmondy improved his optical equipment for the observation of finest nanoparticles suspended in liquid solution. As a result, he introduced the immersion ultramicroscope in 1912.

Together with Wilhelm Bachmann, Zsigmondy developed a new membrane filter (1916). He later transferred his patents to a company established by him, other shareholders and Sartorius AG which was incorporated to Sartorius in the late 1970s.

=== Private life ===
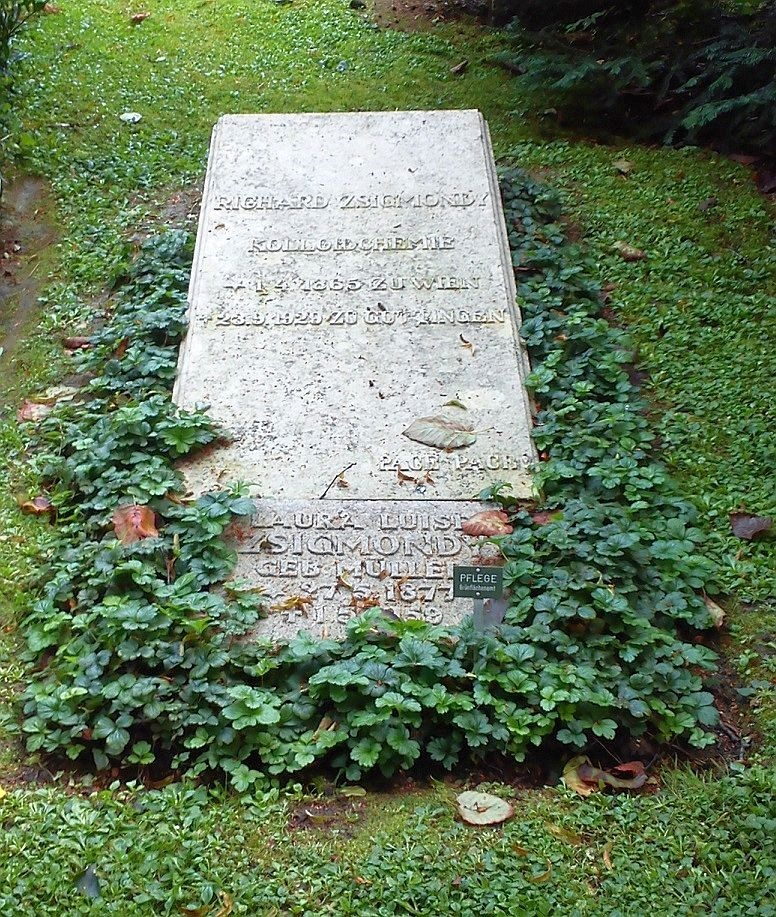
Göttingen, grave Zsigmondy's

In 1903, Zsigmondy married Laura Luise Müller, with whom he had two daughters, Annemarie and Käthe.

Richard Zsigmondy died due to his arteriosclerosis only a few months after retiring from his position at the University of Göttingen in early March.

He was a cousin of the architect Frigyes Schulek, whose mother was Auguszta Zsigmondy. He is also related to the violinist Dénes Zsigmondy.

== Ancestry ==
Zsigmondy
Richard Zsigmondy, Vienna (A) 1862–Göttingen (D) 1929 scientist, Nobel Prize Winner in chemistry 1925	Father: Adolf Zsigmondy; Pressburg/ Pozsony, (HUN) 1816– Vienna (A) 1880	Grandfather: Sámuel Zsigmondy; Pilis, (HUN) 1788– 1833 Pressburg/ Pozsony (HUN)	Great-grandfather: G. Zsigmondy; Körmöcbánya (HUN) 1748-Pilis (HUN) 1799	Great-great-grandfather: J. Zsigmondy; Bártfa (HUN) ca 1700 -Körmöcbánya(HUN) 1765	Great-great-grandmother: Zsuzsanna Kossovits; Besztercebánya (HUN) ? -Lónyabánya (HUN) 1790
Richard Zsigmondy, Vienna (A) 1862–Göttingen (D) 1929 scientist, Nobel Prize Winner in chemistry 1925	Father: Adolf Zsigmondy; Pressburg/ Pozsony, (HUN) 1816– Vienna (A) 1880	Grandfather: Sámuel Zsigmondy; Pilis, (HUN) 1788– 1833 Pressburg/ Pozsony (HUN)	Great-grandmother: Judit Polereczky; Alberti (Now Albertirsa) (HUN) 1756– 1833 Pressburg/Pozsony (HUN)		
Richard Zsigmondy, Vienna (A) 1862–Göttingen (D) 1929 scientist, Nobel Prize Winner in chemistry 1925	Father: Adolf Zsigmondy; Pressburg/ Pozsony, (HUN) 1816– Vienna (A) 1880	Grandmother: Friderika Fábry 1793 Pressburg/ Pozsony (HUN)– 1868 Pressburg/Pozsony (HUN)	grandmother's father: István Fábry; Hrussó (HUN) 1751 – Pressburg/ Pozsony (HUN) 1817		
Richard Zsigmondy, Vienna (A) 1862–Göttingen (D) 1929 scientist, Nobel Prize Winner in chemistry 1925	Father: Adolf Zsigmondy; Pressburg/ Pozsony, (HUN) 1816– Vienna (A) 1880	Grandmother: Friderika Fábry 1793 Pressburg/ Pozsony (HUN)– 1868 Pressburg/Pozsony (HUN)	grandmother's mother: Terézia Bayer		
Richard Zsigmondy, Vienna (A) 1862–Göttingen (D) 1929 scientist, Nobel Prize Winner in chemistry 1925	Mother: Irma von Szakmáry; Martonvásár (HUN) 1835; Vienna 1900	Mothers father: N.N. von Szakmáry (1818– 1888)	Mother's grandfather :		
Richard Zsigmondy, Vienna (A) 1862–Göttingen (D) 1929 scientist, Nobel Prize Winner in chemistry 1925	Mother: Irma von Szakmáry; Martonvásár (HUN) 1835; Vienna 1900	Mothers father: N.N. von Szakmáry (1818– 1888)	N.N.:		
Richard Zsigmondy, Vienna (A) 1862–Göttingen (D) 1929 scientist, Nobel Prize Winner in chemistry 1925	Mother: Irma von Szakmáry; Martonvásár (HUN) 1835; Vienna 1900	Mothers mother: Mária Gegus von Kisgessény ? 1800; Pressburg/ Pozsony (HUN) 18 September 1883	N.N. : Sámuel Gegus		

== Honours ==
- Nobel Prize in Chemistry (1925, awarded in 1926)
- Member of the Göttingen Academy of Sciences and Humanities, Göttingen (since 1914)
- Corresponding member of the Academia de Ciencias de Zaragoza, the Austrian Academy of Sciences and academies/academic societies in Valencia and Harlem.
- Honorary doctorates of TU Wien (1917), Graz University of Technology (1928), and the medical faculty of the University of Königsberg.

== Selected publications ==
- Zsigmondy, R. (1885). "Die Bestimmung des Glycerins in verdünnten wässrigen Lösungen und in Fetten". Chemiker-Zeitung. 9 (55). Rudolf Benedikt: 975–976. Bibcode:1900AnP...306...69P. doi:10.1002/andp.19003060105.
- Zsigmondy, R. (1887). "Neue Lüster und Farben auf Glas". Polytechnisches Journal. 266: 364–370.
- Zsigmondy, R. (1890). Beiträge zur Synthese von Indenderivaten. München: Buchdr. von J. Fuller. LCCN tmp84012343.
- Zsigmondy, R. (1898). "Ueber wässrige Lösungen metallischen Goldes". Annalen der Chemie. 301 (1): 29–54. Bibcode:1943NW.....31..153P. doi:10.1002/jlac.18983010104.
- Zsigmondy, R. (1901). "Ueber die Absorption des Lichtes in Farbgläsern". Annalen der Physik. 309 (1): 60–71. Bibcode:1901AnP...309...60Z. doi:10.1002/andp.19013090104.
- Zsigmondy, R. (1902). "Über kolloidale Lösungen". Zeitschrift für Elektrochemie. 8 (36): 684–687. doi:10.1002/bbpc.19020083608.
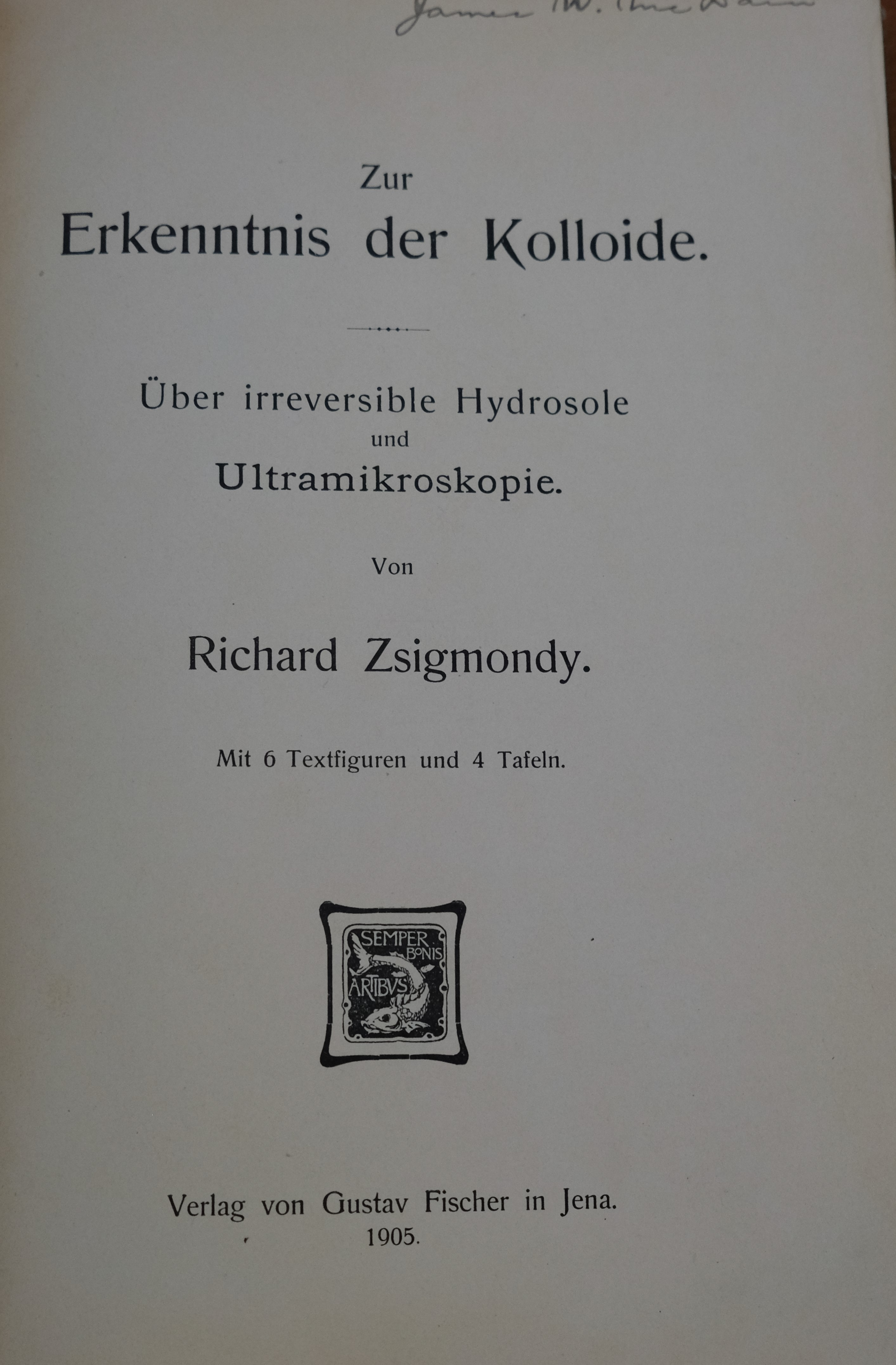
- Title page to Zur Erkenntnis der Kolloide. Uber irreversible Hydrosole und Ultramikroskopie (1905)
  Zsigmondy, R. (1905). Zur Erkenntnis der Kolloide. Über irreversible Hydrosole und Ultramikroskopie. Jena: Gustav Fischer. OL 1473920W.
- Zsigmondy, R. (1907). Über Kolloid-Chemie mit besonderer Berücksichtigung der anorganischen Kolloide. Leipzig: Johann Ambrosius Barth.
- Zsigmondy, R. (1909). Colloids and the ultramicroscope; a manual of colloid chemistry and ultramicroscopy. Jerome Alexander (chemist) (transl.) (1st ed.). New York: Wiley (publisher). LCCN 09012628.
- Zsigmondy, R. (1912). Kolloidchemie: ein Lehrbuch. Leipzig: Otto Spamer. LCCN 12018021.
- Zsigmondy, R. (1913). "Über einen einfachen Ultrafiltrationsapparat". Angewandte Chemie. 26 (63): 447–448. Bibcode:1913AngCh..26..447Z. doi:10.1002/ange.19130266303.
- Zsigmondy, R. (1914). "Handhabung des Immersionsultramikroskops". Kolloid-Zeitschrift. 14 (6). W. Bachmann: 281–295. doi:10.1007/BF01423340. S2CID 97752413.
- Zsigmondy, R. (1917). The chemistry of colloids, Part I. Spear, E. (transl.) (1st ed.). New York: Wiley (publisher). LCCN 17029221.

== See also ==
- Gold number
