= Martonvásár =

- Town
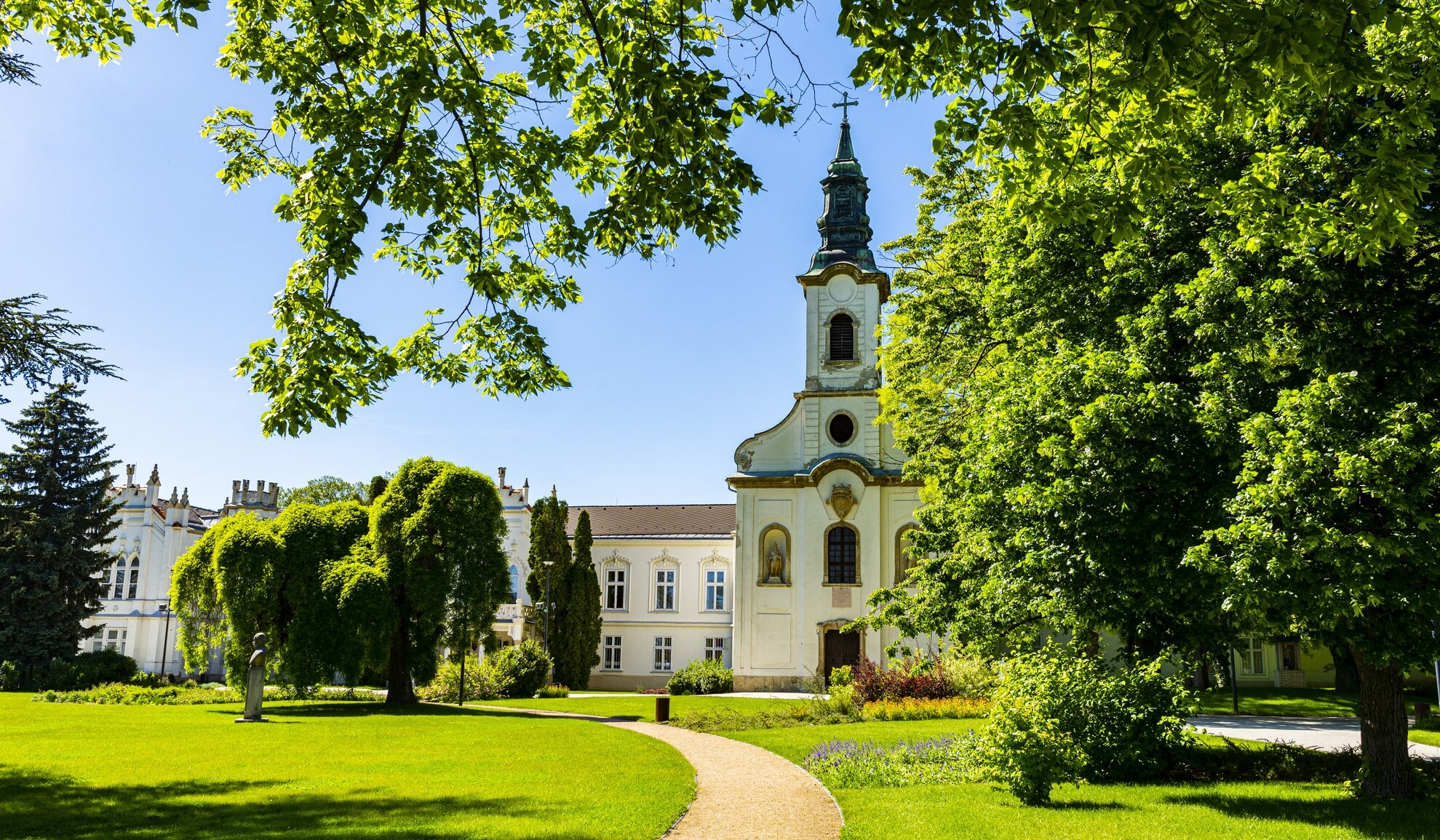
- Brunszvik Palace in Martonvásár.

- Flag Coat of arms

- Location of Martonvásár
- Coordinates: 47.31396°N 18.78848°E
- Country: Hungary
- Region: Central Transdanubia
- County: Fejér
- District: Martonvásár

Government
  - Mayor: Horváth Bálint (Ind.)

Area
  - Total: 31.25 km^{2} (12.07 sq mi)

Population (2022)
  - Total: 6,106
  - Density: 195.4/km^{2} (506.1/sq mi)
- Time zone: UTC+1 (CET)
  - Summer (DST): UTC+2 (CEST)
- Postal code: 2462
- Area code: (+36) 22
- Motorways: M7
- Distance from Budapest: 32.2 km (20.0 mi) Northeast
- Website: www.martonvasar.hu

Martonvásár is the 11th largest town in Fejér county, Hungary. It's a popular tourist destination in Hungary because of the Brunszvik Palace where Ludwig van Beethoven stayed and wrote "Für Elise". There is also a museum for Beethoven. The town is also famous for its English garden.

== Gallery ==
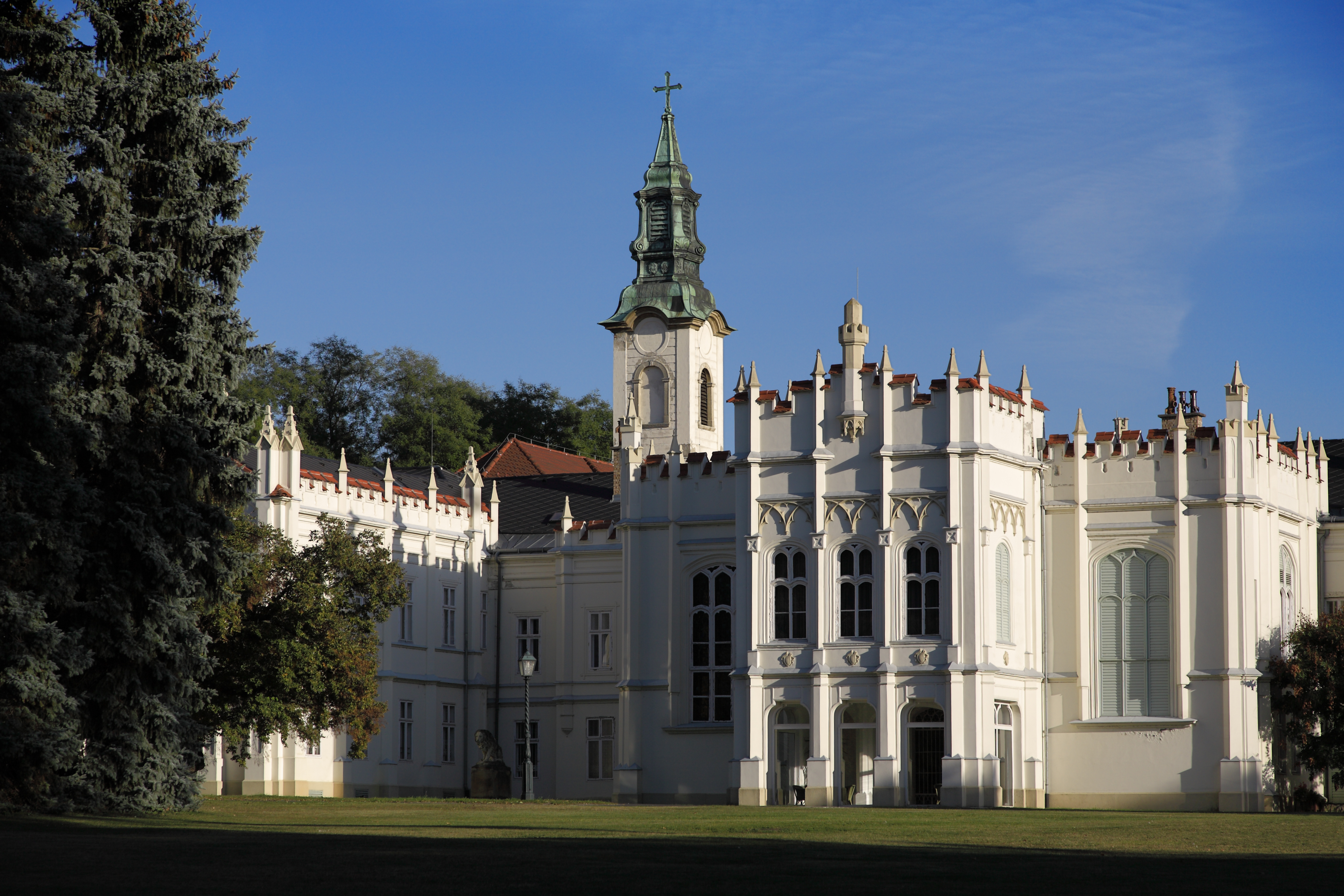

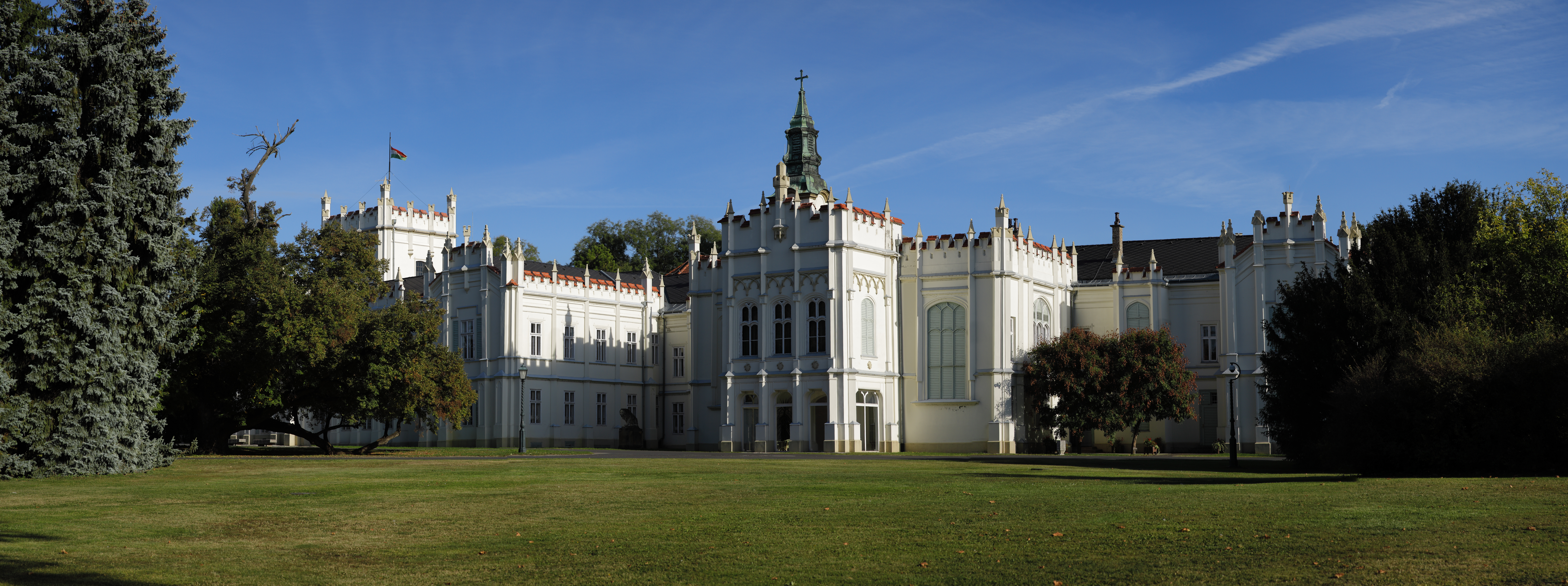
