= Zsigmondy's theorem =

On prime divisors of differences two nth powers

In number theory, Zsigmondy's theorem, named after Karl Zsigmondy, states that if $a>b>0$ are coprime integers, then for any integer $n \ge 1$, there is a prime number p (called a primitive prime divisor) that divides $a^n-b^n$ and does not divide $a^k-b^k$ for any positive integer $k<n$, with the following exceptions:

- $n=1$, $a-b=1$; then $a^n-b^n=1$ which has no prime divisors
- $n=2$, $a+b$ a power of two; then any odd prime factors of $a^2-b^2=(a+b)(a^1-b^1)$ must be contained in $a^1-b^1$, which is also even
- $n=6$, $a=2$, $b=1$; then $a^6-b^6=63=3^2\times 7=(a^2-b^2)^2 (a^3-b^3)$

This generalizes Bang's theorem, which states that if $n>1$ and $n$ is not equal to 6, then $2^n-1$ has a prime divisor not dividing any $2^k-1$ with $k<n$.

Similarly, $a^n+b^n$ has at least one primitive prime divisor with the exception $2^3+1^3=9$.

Zsigmondy's theorem is often useful, especially in group theory, where it is used to prove that various groups have distinct orders except when they are known to be the same. It is also used in mathematical olympiads.

== History ==
The theorem was discovered by Karl Zsigmondy who proved it in 1892.

== Generalizations ==
Let $(a_n)_{n\ge1}$ be a sequence of nonzero integers. The Zsigmondy set associated to the sequence is the set

$$\mathcal{Z}(a_n) = \{n \ge 1 : a_n \text{ has no primitive prime divisors}\}.$$

i.e., the set of indices $n$ such that every prime dividing $a_n$ also divides some $a_m$ for some $m < n$. Thus Zsigmondy's theorem implies that $\mathcal{Z}(a^n-b^n)\subset\{1,2,6\}$, and Carmichael's theorem says that the Zsigmondy set of the Fibonacci sequence is $\{1,2,6,12\}$, and that of the Pell sequence is $\{1\}$. In 2001 Bilu, Hanrot, and Voutier proved that in general, if $(a_n)_{n\ge1}$ is a Lucas sequence or a Lehmer sequence, then $\mathcal{Z}(a_n) \subseteq \{ 1 \le n \le 30 \}$ (see (sequence A285314 in the OEIS), there are only 13 such $n$s, namely 1, 2, 3, 4, 5, 6, 7, 8, 10, 12, 13, 18, 30). Lucas and Lehmer sequences are examples of divisibility sequences.

It is also known that if $(W_n)_{n\ge1}$ is an elliptic divisibility sequence, then its Zsigmondy set $\mathcal{Z}(W_n)$ is finite. However, the result is ineffective in the sense that the proof does not give an explicit upper bound for the largest element in $\mathcal{Z}(W_n)$, although it is possible to give an effective upper bound for the number of elements in $\mathcal{Z}(W_n)$.

== See also ==
- Carmichael's theorem
- Wilson prime
- Kaprekar's constant
- Fermat's little theorem
- Palindromic numbers
- Harshad numbers
- Dirichlet's theorem on arithmetic progressions
