= Dénes Zsigmondy =

Hungarian violinist

- Born: Dénes Liedemann; 9 April 1922; Budapest, Kingdom of Hungary
- Died: 15 February 2014 (aged 91); Bavaria, Germany
- Occupation: Classical violinist
- Years active: 1944–2014
- Spouse: Anneliese Nissen (m. 1947; died 2014)
- Children: 2

Works of Franz Schubert, performed by Dénes Zsigmondy (violin) and Anneliese Nissen (piano)
Sonatina in D major, D. 384

Sonatina in A minor, D. 385

Sonatina in G minor, D. 408

Sonata (Duo) in A major, D. 574

Rondeau brillant in B, D. 895 Op. 70

Fantasy in C major, D. 934

Dénes Zsigmondy (9 April 1922 – 15 February 2014) was a Hungarian classical violinist and music educator.

He was born Dénes Liedemann in Budapest, but changed his name to Zsigmondy, his paternal grandmother's surname, as it was more Hungarian than German. In 1944, whilst attending the Summer Academy in Salzburg, he was informed by his parents that he had been drafted into the Hungarian military—to avoid the draft he did not return to Hungary and hid out with a German family at Lake Starnberg. After World War II, Zsigmondy was rejected by several orchestras before joining the Bavarian Radio Symphony Orchestra when he impressed the conductor with his performance of Brahms' Violin Concerto.

Following this appointment, Zsigmondy would perform as a soloist with the Berliner Symphoniker and the Vienna Symphony; the philharmonic orchestras of Tokyo, Budapest and Munich; and the radio orchestras of the Australian Broadcasting Corporation in Sydney and Melbourne, and in Munich; as well as the Stuttgart Chamber Orchestra and the Camerata Salzburg.

From 1971, he was a professor (later emeritus professor) of music at the University of Washington at Seattle, a visiting professor at Boston University, and conducted masterclasses at the New England Conservatory and other institutions around the world. He taught at the Hochschule für Musik Mainz in his later years.

He was married to the pianist Anneliese Nissen, with whom he gave recitals, from 1947 until her death in 2014. The couple had two daughters.

Zsigmondy died, aged 91, at his home in Bavaria, Germany on 15 February 2014.
