= List of compositions by Franz Schubert (1817) =

Franz Schubert's compositions of 1817 are mostly in the Deutsch catalogue (D) range D 511–598, and include:

- Instrumental works:
  - Symphony No. 6, D 589 (composition started in October 1817)
  - String Trio, D 581
  - Violin Sonata in A major, D 574
  - Piano Sonata in A minor, D 537
  - Piano Sonata in A♭ major, D 557
  - Piano Sonata in E minor, D 566
  - Piano Sonata in D♭ major, D 568
  - Piano Sonata in E♭ major, D 568
  - Piano Sonata in F♯ minor, D 571
  - Piano Sonata in B major, D 575
- Vocal music:
  - "Der Tod und das Mädchen", D 531
  - "An die Musik", D 547
  - "Die Forelle", D 550 (not all versions of this Lied were composed in 1817)

== Table ==
=== Legend ===
Legend to the table
column		content
1	D '51	Deutsch number in the first version of the Deutsch catalogue (1951)
2	D utd	most recent (utd = up to date) Deutsch catalogue number; the basic collation of the list is according to these numbers – whether or not the possibility to adjust the sorting according to the content of other columns is available depends on the device with which the table is displayed.
3	Op. pbl	Opus number (Op.; p indicates Post. = posthumous) and date of first publication (pbl; between brackets; when there is more than one date the earlier dates indicate partial publications). The column sorts to Opus number, then (earliest of) the publication date(s)
4	AGA	Alte Gesamt-Ausgabe = Franz Schubert's Werke: Kritisch durchgesehene Gesammtausgabe. Indicates genre/instrumentation: Series I: Symphonien (Nos. 1-8) (Johannes Brahms, 1884); Series II: Overtüren und Andere Orchesterwerke (Johann Nepomuk Fuchs, 1886); Series III: Oktette (Nos. 1-3) and IV: Streichquintett (Eusebius Mandyczewski, 1889); Series V: Streichquartette (Nos. 1-15) (Joseph Hellmesberger and Eusebius Mandyczewski, 1890); Series VI: Trio für Streichinstrumente (Eusebius Mandyczewski, 1892); Series VII: Trios, Quartets and Quintets with Piano and VIII: Pianoforte und Ein Instrument (Ignaz Brüll, 1886); Series IX: Pianoforte zu vier Händen (Anton Door, 1888); Series X: Sonaten für Pianoforte (Julius Epstein, 1888); Series XI: Fantasie, Impromptus und andere Stücke für Pianoforte (Julius Epstein, 1888); Series XII: Tänze für Pianoforte (Nos. 1-31) (Julius Epstein, 1889); Series XIII: Messen (Nos. 1-7) (Eusebius Mandyczewski, 1887); Series XIV: Kleinere Kirchenmusikwerke (Nos. 1-22) (Eusebius Mandyczewski, 1888); Series XV: Dramatische Musik (Johann Nepomuk Fuchs, 1893); Series XVI: Werke für Männerchor (Nos. 1-46) (Eusebius Mandyczewski, 1891); Series XVII: Werke für gemischten Chor (Nos. 1-19) (Josef Gänsbacher, Eusebius Mandyczewski, 1892); Series XVIII: Werke für Drei und mehr Frauenstimmen mit Pianoforte-Begleitung (Nos. 1-6) (Josef Gänsbacher, Eusebius Mandyczewski, 1891); Series XIX: Kleine Gesangswerke (Nos. 1-36) (Josef Gänsbacher and Eusebius Mandyczewski, 1892); Series XX: Sämtliche einstimmige Lieder und Gesänge (Eusebius Mandyczewski, 1894-1895); Series XXI: Supplement (Eusebius Mandyczewski, 1897); 1. Instrumentalmusik No. 1-5; 2. Instrumentalmusik No. 6-13; 3. Instrumentalmusik No. 14-; 4. Gesangsmusik; Series XXII: Revisionsbericht
5	NSA	NGA/NSA/NSE = New Schubert Edition, also indicates genre/instrumentation: Series I: Church Music; Series II: Stage Works; Series III: Part Songs; Series IV: Lieder; Series V: Orchestral Works; Series VI: Chamber Music; 1. Octet and Nonet; 2. String Quintet; 3. String Quartets I; 4. String Quartets II; 5. String Quartets III; 6. String Trios; 7. Works for Piano and several instruments; 8. Works for Piano and one instrument; 9. Dances for several instruments; Series VII: Piano Music; 1. Works for Piano Four Hands; 2. Works for Piano Two Hands; Series VIII: Supplement, 2. Schubert's Studies
6	Name	unique name, with, if available, a link to the relevant encyclopedia article; sorts by name with initial definite ("Der", "Die", "Das", ...) or indefinite ("Ein", "A", ...) articles, and numbers, moved after the expression they qualify: e.g. "Die Hoffnung, ..." sorts as "Hoffnung, Die, ..." – "Thirty Minuets ..." sorts as "Minuets, 30, ...".
7	Key / incipit	incipit mostly for songs (linking to lyrics and their translation, for instance at The LiederNet Archive, when available), other compositions by key, except for Schubert's stage works: type of composition in brackets.
8	Date	(presumed) date of composition, or, for copies and arrangements, date of Schubert's autograph. Sorts to earliest possible date of completion, unlike the chronology of the Deutsch catalogue that generally collates according to earliest date associated with the composition: e.g. Schubert started the composition of his 3rd String Quartet on 19 November 1812 and completed it on 21 February 1813 – in the Deutsch catalogue the composition is grouped with other compositions from 1812: when using the sort function of the 8th column the composition is grouped with compositions completed in 1813
9	Additional info	may include: Information about the text (lyrics, libretto) of vocal compositions: e.g., "Text by [text author]", "Text: [standard lyrics]", "... from [literary work]"; "other settings: D ..." indicates Schubert's other settings of the same text; for fields starting with "Text ..." this column sorts by text author (last name, first name—or pen name when such name is more established), then incipit of the lyrics (alternatively, when the incipit is rarely used, title of the work); Information about the authenticity of the composition: the work is without doubt Schubert's unless when marked as "Doubtful", "Spurious?" or "Spurious" (in the last case columns 3–8 give no further information about the composition); Forces needed for performance ("For ..."): may be omitted when the type of composition makes the instrumentation clear (e.g. String Quartet → two violins, viola and cello), and, for vocal music, when the setting is for voice and piano; "s", "a", "t" and "b" refer to a single soprano, alto, tenor and bass singer respectively, while "S", "A", "T" and "B" to choral parts for the same types of singers (see SATB).; Specifications regarding movements (e.g. "Allegro – Minuet – Rondo") or sections (e.g. "No. 1 ..."); Information about the completeness of the extant work: the work is considered complete as extant unless when marked "Sketch", "Incomplete", "Unfinished", "Fragment" or "Lost"; Information about versions (e.g. "Two versions: ...")

=== List ===
Compositions by Franz Schubert listed in the Deutsch catalogue for 1817
D '51	D utd	Op. pbl	AGA	NSA	Name	Key / incipit	Date	Additional info
511	511			VII/2, 6	Écossaise, D 511	E♭ major	c. 1817	For piano
513	513	(1891)	XVI; No. 19	III, 3 Anh. II No. 4	La pastorella al prato, D 513	La pastorella al prato	1817?	Text by Goldoni, from Il filosofo di campagna II, 16 (other setting: D 528); For ttbb and piano
	513A			IV, 11	Nur wer die Liebe kennt	Nur wer die Liebe kennt	1817?	Text by Werner; Sketch
514	514	7,1 (1823)	XX, 5 No. 300	IV, 1a	Die abgeblühte Linde	Wirst du halten, was du schwurst	1817?	Text by Széchényi
515	515	7,2 (1823)	XX, 5 No. 301	IV, 1a	Der Flug der Zeit	Es floh die Zeit im Wirbelfluge	1817?	Text by Széchényi
516	516	8,2 (1822)	XX, 6 No. 386	IV, 1a & Anh. No. 5	Sehnsucht, D 516	Der Lerche wolkennahe Lieder	1816?	Text by Mayrhofer
517	517	13,1 (1822) (1972)	XX, 5 No. 293	IV, 1a	Der Schäfer und der Reiter	Ein Schäfer saß im Grünen	April 1817	Text by Motte Fouqué; Two versions: 2nd, in AGA, is Op. 13 No. 1
518	518	(1824)	XX, 5 No. 326	IV, 5	An den Tod	Tod, du Schrecken der Natur	1816 or 1817	Text by Schubart; For b and piano
519	519	173p,5 (1867)	XX, 5 No. 299	IV, 11	Die Blumensprache	Es deuten die Blumen des Herzens Gefühle	1817?	Text by Platner (?)
520	520	(1850) (1895)	XX, 5 No. 289	IV, 11	Frohsinn	Ich bin von lockerem Schlage	January; 1817	Text by Castelli; Two versions: 1st in AGA
521	521	(1830) (1895)	XX, 5 No. 290	III, 3 No. 16; Anh. I No. 6	Jagdlied	Trarah! Trarah! Wir kehren daheim	January; 1817	Text by Werner, from Wanda, Königin der Sarmaten I (other text in 1830 ed.); For voice (or: unison choir) and piano
522	522	(1895)	XX, 5 No. 291	IV, 11	Die Liebe, D 522	Wo weht der Liebe hoher Geist?	January; 1817	Text by Leon
523	523	(1885)	XX, 5 No. 292	IV, 11	Trost, D 523	Nimmer lange weil' ich hier	January; 1817	
524	524	13,3 (1822) (1895) (1970)	XX, 5 No. 295	IV, 1a & b No. 12	Der Alpenjäger, D 524	Auf hohem Bergesrücken	January; 1817	Text by Mayrhofer; Three versions: 2nd, not in AGA, is for b and piano – 3rd is Op. 13 No. 3
525	525	21,3 (1823) (1970)	XX, 5 No. 296	IV, 1a & b No. 18	Wie Ulfru fischt	Der Angel zuckt, die Rute bebt	January; 1817	Text by Mayrhofer; For b and piano; Two versions: 2nd, in AGA, is Op. 21 No. 3
526	526	(1832)	XX, 5 No. 297	IV, 11	Fahrt zum Hades	Der Nachen dröhnt	January; 1817	Text by Mayrhofer; For b and piano
527	527	24,2 (1823) (1975)	XX, 5 No. 298	IV, 2a & b No. 2	Schlaflied a.k.a. Abendlied a.k.a. Schlummerlied	Es mahnt der Wald	January; 1817	Text by Mayrhofer; Two versions: 2nd, in AGA, is Op. 24 No. 2
528	528	(1872)	XX, 10; No. 574	IV, 11	La pastorella al prato, D 528	La pastorella al prato	January; 1817	Text by Goldoni, from Il filosofo di campagna II, 16 (other setting: D 513); Arietta for soprano and piano
529	529	(1871) (1897)	XII; No. 11; XXI, 3 No. 30	VII/2, 6	Eight Écossaises, D 529	Various keys	February; 1817	For piano; Nos. 1–3, 6 and 8 publ. 1871
530	530	109p,3 (1829)	XX, 4 No. 273	IV, 11	An eine Quelle	Du kleine grünumwachs'ne Quelle	February; 1817	Text by Claudius
531	531	7,3 (1823)	XX, 5 No. 302	IV, 1a	Der Tod und das Mädchen	Vorüber, ach vorüber	February; 1817	Text by Claudius; Music partly reappears in D 810
532	532	(1895)	XX, 5 No. 303	IV, 11	Das Lied vom Reifen	Seht meine lieben Bäume an	February; 1817	Text by Claudius; Fragment (completed in AGA)
533	533	(1876) (1895)	XX, 5 No. 304	IV, 11	Täglich zu singen	Ich danke Gott und freue mich	February; 1817	Text by Claudius; 1876 publ. is piano reduction
534	534	(1830)	XX, 5 No. 305	IV, 11	Die Nacht, D 534	Die Nacht ist dumpfig und finster	February; 1817	Text by Macpherson (Ossian), from Domhnull mac Fhionnlaidh, transl. by E. Baron de Harold
535	535	(1853) (1895)	XX, 10; No. 585	III, 1	Lied, D 535	Brüder, schrecklich brennt die Träne	February; 1817	For s and small orchestra; 1853 ed. is arrangement
536	536	21,2 (1823) (1970)	XX, 5 No. 318	IV, 1a & b No. 17	Der Schiffer, D 536	Im winde, im Sturme	1817?	Text by Mayrhofer; For b and piano; Two versions: 2nd, in AGA, is Op. 21 No. 2
537	537	164p (1852)	X No. 6	VII/2, 1 No. 4	Piano Sonata, D 537	A minor	March 1817	Allegro ma non troppo – Allegretto quasi Andantino – Allegro vivace
538	538	(1891)	XVI; No. 33	III, 4 No. 42	Gesang der Geister über den Wassern, D 538	Des Menschen Seele gleicht dem Wasser	March 1817	Text by Goethe (other settings: D 484, 705 and 714); For ttbb
539	539	8,4 (1822)	XX, 5 No. 306	IV, 1a	Am Strome	Ist mir's doch, als sei mein Leben	March 1817	Text by Mayrhofer
540	540	(1831)	XX, 5 No. 307	IV, 11	Philoktet	Da sitz' ich ohne Bogen	March 1817	Text by Mayrhofer
541	541	6,1 (1821)	XX, 5 No. 308	IV, 1a	Memnon	Den Tag hindurch nur einmal mag ich sprechen	March 1817	Text by Mayrhofer
542	542	6,2 (1821)	XX, 5 No. 309	IV, 1a	Antigone und Oedip	Ihr hohen Himmlischen	March 1817	Text by Mayrhofer
543	543	92,2 (1828) (1895)	XX, 5 No. 310	IV, 5	Auf dem See	Und frische Nahrung	March 1817	Text by Goethe; Two versions: 2nd is Op. 92 No. 2
544	544	19,3 (1825)	XX, 5 No. 311	IV, 1a	Ganymed	Wie im Morgenglanze	March 1817	Text by Goethe
545	545	(1872) (1895)	XX, 5 No. 312	IV, 11	Der Jüngling und der Tod	Die Sonne sinkt, o könnt ich	March 1817	Text by Spaun; Two versions: 1st is duet – 2nd publ. 1872
546	546	101p,3 (1827)	XX, 5 No. 313	IV, 5	Trost im Liede	Braust des Unglücks Sturm empor	March 1817	Text by Schober; Publ. as Op. posth. 101 No. 3 in 1828
547	547	88,4 (1827) (1895)	XX, 5 No. 314	IV, 4	An die Musik	Du holde Kunst	March 1817	Text by Schober; Two versions: 2nd is Op. 88 No. 4
548	548	(1831)	XX, 6 No. 382	IV, 11	Orest auf Tauris	Ist dies Tauris	March 1817	Text by Mayrhofer
549	549	(1895)	XX, 10; No. 595	IV, 13	Mahomets Gesang, D 549	Seht den Felsenquell	March 1817	Text by Goethe (other setting: D 721); Fragment
550	550	32 (1820) (1895) (1975)	XX, 5 No. 327	IV, 2a & b No. 3	Die Forelle	In einem Bächlein helle	late 1816– October 1821	Text by Schubart; Five versions: 1st–4th in AGA – 4th publ. as Op. 32 in 1827; Music partly reappears in D 667
551	551	(1831)	XX, 5 No. 315	IV, 11	Pax vobiscum	Der Friede sei mit euch!	April 1817	Text by Schober
552	552	20,3 (1823) (1970)	XX, 5 No. 316	IV, 1a & b No. 16	Hänflings Liebeswerbung	Ahidi! ich liebe	April 1817	Text by Kind; Two versions: 2nd, in AGA, is Op. 20 No. 3; Music related to D 972 No. 3
553	553	21,1 (1823)	XX, 5 No. 317	IV, 1a	Auf der Donau	Auf der Wellen Spiegel	April 1817	Text by Mayrhofer; For b and piano
554	554	(1895)	XX, 5 No. 319	IV, 11	Uraniens Flucht	Laßt uns, ihr Himmlischen, ein Fest begehen!	April 1817	Text by Mayrhofer
555	555	(1934)		IV, 11	Liedentwurf, D 555	A minor	May 1817?	Sketch without text
556	556	(1886)	II No. 4	V, 5	Overture, D 556	D major	May 1817	For orchestra
557	557	(1888)	X No. 3	VII/2, 1 No. 5	Piano Sonata, D 557	A♭ major	May 1817	Allegro moderato – Andante – Allegro
558	558	(1887)	XX, 3 No. 120	IV, 11	Liebhaber in allen Gestalten	Ich wollt', ich wär' ein Fisch	May 1817	Text by Goethe
559	559	(1885)	XX, 3 No. 121	IV, 11	Schweizerlied	Uf'm Bergli bin i g'sässe	May 1817	Text by Goethe
560	560	(1850)	XX, 3 No. 122	IV, 11	Der Goldschmiedsgesell	Es ist doch meine Nachbarin	May 1817	Text by Goethe
561	561	(1872)	XX, 5 No. 320	IV, 11	Nach einem Gewitter	Auf den Blumen	May 1817	Text by Mayrhofer
562	562	(1895)	XX, 5 No. 321	IV, 11	Fischerlied, D 562	Das Fischergewerbe gibt rüstigen Mut	May 1817	Text by Salis-Seewis (other settings: D 351 and 364)
563	563	(1887)	XX, 5 No. 322	IV, 11	Die Einsiedelei, D 563	Es rieselt klar und wehend ein Quell	May 1817	Text by Salis-Seewis (other settings: D 337 and 393)
564	564	(1838)	XX, 10; No. 596	IV, 11	Gretchen im Zwinger a.k.a. Gretchens Bitte	Ach neige, du Schmerzensreiche	May 1817	Text by Goethe, from Faust I, 18; Fragment
565	565	(1876)	XX, 5 No. 324	IV, 11	Der Strom	Mein Leben wälzt sich murrend fort	June 1817?	For b and piano
566	566	(1888) (1907) (1928- 29)	X No. 4	VII/2, 1 No. 6 & Anh. No. 3	Piano Sonata, D 566	E minor	June 1817	Moderato (in AGA) – Allegretto (publ. 1907) – Scherzo (publ. 1928/29); D 506 4th movement?
567; 568	568	122p (1829) (1897)	X No. 7 XXI, 2 No. 9	VII/2, 1 No. 7 & Anh. Nos. 4–6	Piano Sonata in D♭ major, D 568; Piano Sonata in E♭ major, D 568	D♭ major; E♭ major	June 1817	Two versions: 1st, in D♭ major, composed June 1817 – 2nd, in E♭ major, is Op. posth. 122; Allegro moderato – Andante molto – Minuet (2nd version only, D 593 No. 2 for 1st version?) – Allegro moderato (2nd version), Allegretto (fragment, 1st version)
569	569	(1895)	XX, 5 No. 323	III, 3 No. 17	Das Grab, D 569	Das Grab ist tief und stille	June 1817	Text by Salis-Seewis (other settings: D 329A, 330, 377 and 643A); For unison men's choir and piano
570	570	(1897)	XXI, 3 No. 20	VII/2, 1 No. 8 Anh. Nos. 8–9	Scherzo and Allegro	D major (scherzo); F♯ minor (allegro)	July 1817?	For piano; Allegro is fragment; Last movements of D 571?
571	571	(1897)	XXI, 2 No. 10	VII/2, 1 Anh. No. 7	Piano Sonata, D 571	F♯ minor	July 1817	Allegro moderato; Fragment; Completed by (D 604 and) 570?
572	572	(1872)	XVI; No. 34	III, 4 No. 43	Lied im Freien, D 572	Wie schön ist's im Freien	July 1817	Text by Salis-Seewis (other setting: D Anh. I/19; For ttbb
573	573	98,3 (1829)	XX, 5 No. 325	IV, 5	Iphigenia	Blüht denn hier an Tauris Strande	July 1817	Text by Mayrhofer
574	574	162p (1851)	VIII; No. 6	VI, 8 No. 4	Violin Sonata, D 574, a.k.a. (Grand) Duo	A major	August 1817	Allegro moderato – Scherzo – Andantino – Allegro vivace
575	575	147p (1846)	X No. 5	VII/2, 1 No. 9 & Anh. No. 10	Piano Sonata, D 575	B major	August 1817	Allegro ma non troppo – Andante – Scherzo – Allegro giusto
576	576	(1867)	XI No. 7	VII/2, 4	13 Variations on a theme by Anselm Hüttenbrenner	A minor	August 1817	For piano
577	577	(1895)	XX, 10; No. 597	IV, 10	Entzückung an Laura, D 577	Laura, über diese Welt	August 1817	Text by Schiller (other setting: D 390); Two fragments of a sketch
578	578	(1838)	XX, 10; No. 586	IV, 11	Abschied, D 578	Lebe wohl! Du lieber Freund!	24/08/1817	Text by Schubert
579	579	(1872) (1897)	XX, 5 No. 335; XXII, 11; No. 335	IV, 11	Der Knabe in der Wiege	Er schläft so süß	Autumn; 1817	Text by Ottenwalt; Two versions: 1st publ. 1872 – 2nd is fragment
989	579A	(1970)		IV, 11	Vollendung	Wenn ich einst das Ziel errungen habe	Sept. or Oct. 1817?	Text by Matthisson
989A	579B	(1970)		IV, 11	Die Erde	Wenn sanft entzückt mein Auge sieht	Sept. or Oct. 1817?	Text by Matthisson
580	580	(1928)		V, 7 No. 3	Polonaise, D 580	B♭ major	September; 1817	For violin and orchestra
581	581	(1897)	XXI, 1 No. 5	VI, 6 No. 2–3	String Trio, D 581	B♭ major	September; 1817	Allegro moderato – Andante – Minuet – Rondo
583	583	24,1 (1823)	XX, 5 No. 328	IV, 2a	Gruppe aus dem Tartarus, D 583	Horch, wie Murmeln des empörten Meeres	September; 1817	Text by Schiller (other settings: D 65 and 396)
584	584	(1830)	XX, 5 No. 329	IV, 11	Elysium	Vorüber die stöhnende Klage!	September; 1817	Text by Schiller (settings of separate stanzas: D 51, 53, 54, 57, 58 and 60)
585	585	(1833)	XX, 5 No. 330	IV, 11	Atys	Der Knabe seufzt übers grüne Meer	September; 1817	Text by Mayrhofer
586	586	8,3 (1818)	XX, 5 No. 331	IV, 1a	Erlafsee	Mir ist so wohl, so weh'	September; 1817	Text by Mayrhofer; Publ. as Op. 8 No. 3 in 1822
587; 245	587	(1885) (1895)	XX, 3 No. 107	IV, 11	An den Frühling, D 587	Willkommen, schöner Jüngling!	October; 1817	Text by Schiller (other settings: D 283 and 338); Two versions: 1st publ. 1885 – 2nd was D 245
588	588	37,2 (1825) (1897) (1975)	XX, 5 No. 332; XXII, 11; No. 332	IV, 2a & b No. 7	Der Alpenjäger, D 588	Willst du nicht das Lämmlein hüten?	October; 1817	Text by Schiller; Two versions: 1st incomplete in AGA – 2nd is Op. 37 No. 2
589	589	(1885)	I, 2 No. 6	V, 2 No. 6	Symphony No. 6 Little C major	C major	Oct. 1817– Feb. 1818	Adagio, Allegro – Andante – Scherzo – Allegro moderato
590	590	(1886)	II No. 5	V, 5	Overture in the Italian Style, D 590	D major	November; 1817	For orchestra; Piano duet arrangement: D 592; Music partly reappears in D 644
591	591	170p (1865)	II No. 6	V, 5	Overture in the Italian Style, D 591	C major	November; 1817	For orchestra; Piano duet arrangement: D 597
592	592	(1872)	IX, 2 No. 10	VII/1, 5 No. 1	Overture in the Italian Style, D 592	D major	December; 1817	For piano duet; Arrangement of D 590
593	593	(1871)	XI No. 15	VII/2, 4	Two Scherzi	Various keys	November; 1817	For piano; No. 2 related to D 568
594	594	110p (1829)	XX, 5 No. 333	IV, 11	Der Kampf	Nein, länger werd' ich diesen Kampf nicht kämpfen	November; 1817	Text by Schiller; For b and piano
595	595	88,2 (1827) (1895)	XX, 5 No. 334	IV, 4	Thekla: Eine Geisterstimme, D 595	Wo ich sei, und wo mich hingewendet	November; 1817	Text by Schiller (other setting: D 73); Two versions: 2nd is Op. 88 No. 2
596	596	(1895)	XX, 10; No. 598	IV, 11	Lied eines Kindes	Lauter Freude fühl' ich	November; 1817	Fragment
597	597	(1872)	IX, 2 No. 9	VII/1, 5 No. 2	Overture in the Italian Style, D 597	C major	Nov. or Dec. 1817	For piano duet; Arrangement of D 591
597A	597A				Variations	A major	December; 1817	Lost sketch for violin
598; 641	598	11,1 (1822) (1891)	XVI; No. 4 & No. 46	III, 3 No. 24; Anh. IV No. 4	Das Dörfchen	Ich rühme mir mein Dörfchen hier	December; 1817	Text by Bürger; For ttbb and piano; Two versions: 1st is sketch without piano – 2nd, Op. 11 No. 1, was D 641

== Sources ==
Multi-volume editions, websites and catalogues

- Alte Gesamt-Ausgabe (AGA) = Franz Schubert's Works: Schubert, Franz (1884–1897). Johannes Brahms; Ignaz Brüll; Anton Door; Julius Epstein; Johann Nepomuk Fuchs; Josef Gänsbacher; Joseph Hellmesberger Sr.; Eusebius Mandyczewski (eds.). Franz Schubert's Werke: Kritisch durchgesehene Gesammtausgabe (in German). Leipzig: Breitkopf & Härtel. Reprints of several volumes by Kalmus and Dover Publications; Franz Schubert's Werke (Series I–XIX and XXI), Series XX, Revisionsbericht: Scores at the International Music Score Library Project
- Deutsch catalogue (D) = Schubert Thematic Catalogue:
  - Deutsch, Otto Erich; et al. (Donald R. Wakeling) (1951). Schubert: Thematic Catalogue of all his Works in Chronological Order (1st ed.). London: Dent. 1995 reprint, with errata correction: Deutsch, Otto Erich; et al. (Donald R. Wakeling) (1995). The Schubert Thematic Catalogue (Dover ed.). Mineola, N.Y.: Dover Publications. ISBN 0486286851.
  - Deutsch, Otto Erich (1978). Walther Dürr; Arnold Feil; Christa Landon [in German]; Werner Aderhold (eds.). Franz Schubert: Thematisches Verzeichnis seiner Werke in chronologischer Folge. New Schubert Edition (in German). Kassel: Bärenreiter. ISBN 9783761805718. ISMN 9790006305148.
    - Series VIII (Supplement)
    - Volume 4
- Hoboken catalogue (Hob.): "Joseph Haydn (1732–1809): Werke sortiert nach Hob (Hoboken-Verzeichnis, 1957-78)" (in German). Kaiserslautern: Klassika.
- Köchel catalogue (K.): "Wolfgang Amadeus Mozart (1756–1791): Werke sortiert nach KV^{6} (Köchel-Verzeichnis, 6. Auflage, 1964)" (in German). Kaiserslautern: Klassika.
- Neue Schubert-Ausgabe (NSA) = New Schubert Edition:
  - NSA scores: Schubert, Franz (1968–2019). International Schubert Association (Tübingen) (ed.). Franz Schubert (1797–1828): New Edition of the Complete Works (in German). Kassel: Bärenreiter. [over 80 volumes in eight series] Individual volumes:
    - NSA II, 15: Schubert, Franz; Neumann, Johann Philipp (2008). Jahrmärker, Manuela; Aigner, Thomas (eds.). Sacontala. New Schubert Edition (in German). Kassel: Bärenreiter. ISMN 9790006497294.
      - Series II (Stage Works), Vol. 15
    - NSA VIII, 4: See above Deutsch (1978)
  - NSA website: "New Schubert Edition". Tübingen: International Schubert Association.
- Schubert Online: "www.schubert-online.at: Schubert music manuscripts, first and early editions online". Vienna: Austrian Academy of Sciences (ÖAW).
- The LiederNet Archive: Ezust, Emily; et al. (LiederNet contributors). "Composer: Franz Peter Schubert (1797 - 1828)". Ontario: LiederNet Corporation.

Other

- Badura-Skoda, Eva; Branscombe, Peter, eds. (2008). Schubert Studies: Problems of Style and Chronology. Cambridge University Press. ISBN 0521088720.
  - Walther Dürr "Schubert's Songs and Their Poetry" pp. 1–24
  - Rufus Hallmark "Schubert's 'Auf dem Strom'" pp. 25–46
  - Elaine Brody "Schubert and Sulzer Revisited" pp. 47–60
  - Marius Flothuis "Schubert Revises Schubert" pp. 61–84
  - Elizabeth Norman McKay "Schubert as Composer of Operas" pp. 85–104
  - Peter Branscombe "Schubert and the Melodrama" pp. 105–142
  - Christoph Wolff "Schubert's 'Der Tod und dad Mädchen'" pp. 143–172
  - Peter Gülke on String Quintet D 956 pp. 173–186
  - Paul Badura-Skoda on Schubert's 'Great' C major Symphony pp. 187–208
  - Robert Winter "Paper Studies and the Future of Schubert Research" pp. 209–276
  - Eva Badura-Skoda "The Chronology of Schubert's Piano Trios" pp. 277–296
  - Reinhard Van Hoorickx "The Chronology of Schubert's Fragments and Sketches" pp. 297–326
  - Arnold Feil "Rhythm in Schubert" pp. 327–346
  - Alexander Weinmann on Leopold Puschl and Schubert's sojourn in Zseliz pp. 347–356
- Elsholz, Gunter (1982). Vogel, Reimut (ed.). Franz Schubert: Sinfonie in E-Dur 1825. Stuttgart: Goldoni. ISBN 3922044050. OCLC 987719669.
- Hilmar, Ernst; Jestremski, Margret, eds. (2004). Schubert-Enzyklopädie (in German). Vol. 1. Introduction by Alfred Brendel. Tutzing: Hans Schneider. ISBN 3795211557.
- Keefe, Simon P., ed. (2006). Mozart Studies. Cambridge University Press. ISBN 0521851025.
- Kube, Michael (2009). "Franz Schuberts Deutsche Trauermesse (D 621) als Problem der Text- und Stilkritik". In Mitterauer, Gertraud; Müller, Ulrich; Springeth, Margarete; Vitzthum, Verena (eds.). Was ist Textkritik?: Zur Geschichte und Relevanz eines Zentralbegriffs der Editionswissenschaft (in German). Walter de Gruyter. pp. 129–140. ISBN 3484970782.
- Mozart, Wolfgang Amadeus; Haydn, Joseph; Haydn, Michael (2008). Kircher, Armin (ed.). Chorbuch Mozart • Haydn VII: Kanonsammlung [Choral Collection Mozart • Haydn, Vol. VII: Canon Collection] (in German, Latin, English, and Italian). Stuttgart: Carus-Verlag. OCLC 274222567.
- Newbould, Brian (1999). Schubert: The Music and the Man. University of California Press. ISBN 0520219570.
- Reed, John (1997). The Schubert Song Companion. Manchester University Press. ISBN 1901341003.
- Van Hoorickx, Reinhard (1971). "Franz Schubert (1797–1828) List of the Dances in Chronological Order". Revue belge de Musicologie / Belgisch Tijdschrift voor Muziekwetenschap. 25 (1). Belgian Musicological Society: 68–97. doi:10.2307/3686180. ISSN 0771-6788. JSTOR 3686180.
- Van Hoorickx, Reinhard (1974–1976). "Thematic Catalogue of Schubert's Works: New Additions, Corrections and Notes". Revue belge de Musicologie / Belgisch Tijdschrift voor Muziekwetenschap. 28–30. Belgian Musicological Society: 136–171. doi:10.2307/3686053. ISSN 0771-6788. JSTOR 3686053.
