= 1817 in music =

List of years in music	(table)
- … 1807; 1808; 1809; 1810; 1811; 1812; 1813; 1814; 1815; 1816; 1817; 1818; 1819; 1820; 1821; 1822; 1823; 1824; 1825; 1826; 1827 …
- Art; Archaeology; Architecture; Literature; Music; Philosophy; Science; +...

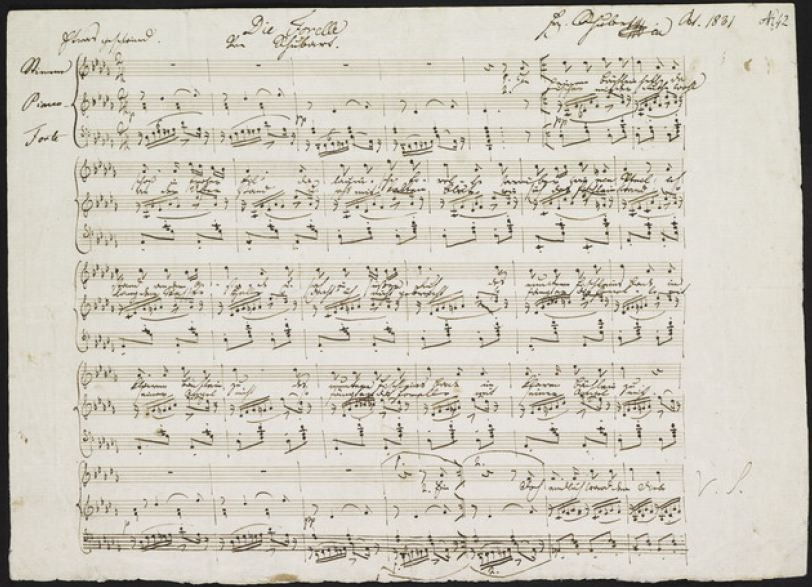
"Die Forelle" by Franz Schubert

This is a list of music-related events in 1817.

== Events ==
- Felix Mendelssohn begins studying composition with Carl Friedrich Zelter.
- Improved form of ophicleide invented by Jean Hilaire Asté in France.

== Classical music ==
- Ludwig van Beethoven
  - String Quintet, Op.104
  - Fugue in D major, Op.137
  - Gesang der Mönche, WoO 104
  - So oder So, WoO 148
  - Resignation, WoO 149
- Alexandre-Pierre-François Boëly – 30 Caprices, Op. 2
- Ferdinando Carulli – 6 Duos for Guitar and Flute, Op. 109
- Frederic Chopin – Two Polonaises
- Muzio Clementi – Gradus ad Parnassum Volume I is published simultaneously in London, Paris and Leipzig on March 1.
- Gaetano Donizetti
  - English Horn Concertino, A 459 (premiered June 19 in Bergamo)
  - Sinfonia for Winds in G minor, A 509 (composed April 19)
- Friedrich Dotzauer – Pot-Pourri for Cello and Guitar, Op. 21
- John Field
  - Nocturne No.4 in A major, H.36
  - Nocturne No.6 in F major ("Berceuse")
- Georg Gerson – Symphony in E-flat major
- Mauro Giuliani
  - Divertimenti, Op. 78
  - Preludes, Op. 83
- Johann Nepomuk Hummel
  - Adagio, Variationen und Rondo über 'Pretty Polly', Op. 75
  - Variations sur un theme original, Op. 76
- Anselm Hüttenbrenner – 6 Variations, Op. 2
- Jean-Baptiste Krumpholtz – 2 Harp Duos, Op. 5
- Iwan Müller – Clarinet Quartet No. 2
- Niccolo Paganini – Violin Concerto No.1, Op.6
- Anton Reicha – Andante for Wind Quintet no. 1 in E-flat major
- Franz Schubert
  - Piano Sonata No.4, D.537
  - Allegro and Scherzo, D.570 (July)
  - String Trio in B-flat major, D. 581 (Autumn)
  - Notable Lieder
    - Trost, D.523
    - Schlaflied, D.527
    - Der Tod und das Mädchen, D.531
    - Ganymed, D.544
    - An die Musik, D.547
    - Die Forelle, D.550
- Louis Spohr – String Quartet No.11, Op. 43
- Václav Jan Tomášek – 6 Eglogues, Op. 47

== Opera ==
- Franz Danzi – Die Probe
- Gioacchino Rossini
  - La Cenerentola
  - La Gazza Ladra
  - Armida
  - Adelaide di Borgogna

== Publications ==
- Francesco Galeazzi – Elementi di Musica

== Published Popular Music ==
- "Oft, in the Stilly Night" – w.m. (arr.) Thomas Moore
- "Te souviens-tu?" – Émile Debraux and Joseph-Denis Doche

== Births ==
- February 3 – Émile Prudent, composer (died 1863)
- February 22 – Niels Gade, composer (d. 1890)
- March 2 – Hans Hansen, composer (d. 1878)
- March 17
  - Karl Schroder I, violinist (died 1890)
  - Julius Stahlknecht, composer (died 1892)
- March 24 – Aimé Maillart, composer (d. 1871)
- March 28 – Mariano Soriano Fuertes, composer (died 1880)
- May 26 – Emil Erslev, composer (died 1882)
- May 27 – Giuseppe Bardari, librettist (died 1861)
- May 31 – Édouard Marie Ernest Deldevez, composer (died 1897)
- June 13 – Antonio Torres Jurado, Spanish guitar maker (d. 1892)
- August 13 – Károly Thern, pianist, conductor and composer (d. 1886)
- September 23 - Léon Charles François Kreutzer, music critic, music historian, and composer (d. 1868)
- October 5 – Eduard Franck, German composer (died 1893)
- November 12
  - Gustav Nottebohm, musicologist (d. 1882)
  - Carlo Pedrotti, composer and conductor (died 1893)
- November 13
  - Louis James Alfred Lefébure-Wély, organist (d. 1869)
  - Henry Brinley Richards, composer (d. 1885)
- November 24 – Fritz Spindler, pianist (died 1905)
- December 19 – Charles Dancla, composer (died 1907)

== Deaths ==
- January 14 – Pierre-Alexandre Monsigny, composer (b. 1729)
- January 28 – F.L.Æ. Kunzen, conductor and composer (b. 1761)
- March 1 – Luigi Gatti, composer (b. 1740)
- June 29 – Ernst Schulze, lyricist and poet (born 1789)
- August 24 – Nancy Storace, operatic soprano (b. 1766)
- October 11 – Franz Xaver Hammer, gambist, cellist and composer (b. 1741)
- October 12 – Johann Franz Xaver Sterkel, composer and pianist (born 1750)
- October 18 – Etienne Méhul, composer (b. 1763)
- November 7 – Francesco Pasquale Ricci, composer (b. 1732)
- December 1 – Justin Heinrich Knecht, organist and composer (b. 1752)
- December 3 – August Eberhard Müller, German composer (born 1767)
- December 11 – Max von Schenkendorf, poet and songwriter (born 1783)
- date unknown –
  - John Peacock, Northumbrian piper (b. c. 1756)
  - Pedro Étienne Solère, composer (born 1753)
