= Francesco Ricci =

Francesco Ricci may refer to:

- Francesco Ricci (mathematician), Italian economist and mathematician
- Francesco Pasquale Ricci (1732–1817), Italian composer and violinist
- Francesco Ricci (politician), Italian politician, former mayor of Chieti
