= Die Forelle =

Lied by Franz Schubert

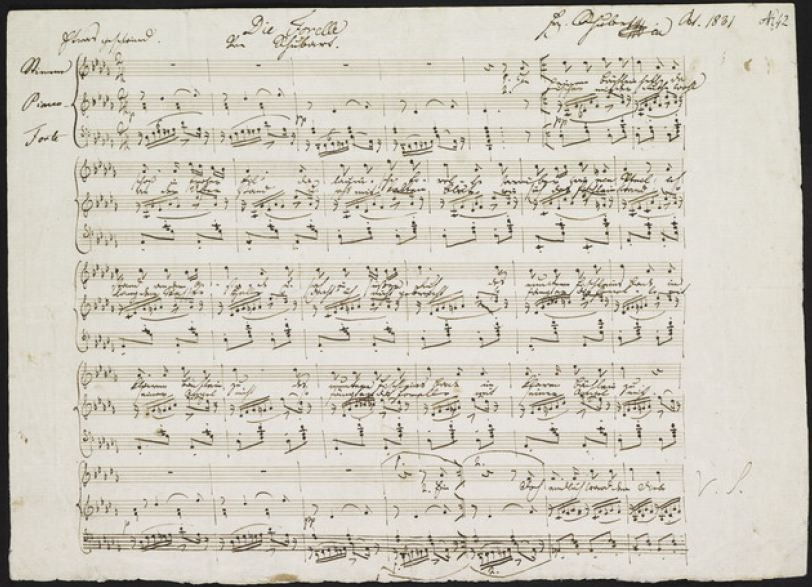
Autograph of "Die Forelle"

"Die Forelle" (German for "The Trout"), Op. 32, D 550. is a lied, or song, composed in early 1817 for solo voice and piano with music by the Austrian composer Franz Schubert. Schubert chose to set the text of a poem by Christian Friedrich Daniel Schubart, first published in the Schwäbischer Musenalmanach in 1783. The full poem tells the story of a trout being caught by a fisherman, but in its final stanza reveals its purpose as a moral piece warning young women to guard against young men. When Schubert set the poem to music, he removed the last verse, which contained the moral, changing the song's focus and enabling it to be sung by male or female singers. Schubert produced six subsequent copies of the work, all with minor variations.

Schubert wrote "Die Forelle" in the single key of D-flat major with a varied (or modified) strophic form. The first two verses have the same structure but change for the final verse to give a musical impression of the trout being caught. In the Deutsch catalogue of Schubert's works it is number 550, or D. 550. The musicologist Marjorie Wing Hirsch describes its type in the Schubert lieder as a "lyrical song with admixtures of dramatic traits".

The song was popular with contemporary audiences, which led to Schubert being commissioned to write a piece of chamber music based on the song. This commission resulted in the Trout Quintet (D. 667), in which a set of variations of "Die Forelle" are present in the fourth movement.

== Context ==
Christian Friedrich Daniel Schubart, who wrote the poem in 1783

The lyrics of the lied are from a poem by Christian Friedrich Daniel Schubart. Opinion is divided on his abilities: The Musical Times considers him to be "one of the feeblest poets" whose work was used by Schubert, and comments that he "was content with versifying pretty ideas", while the singer and author Dietrich Fischer-Dieskau considered Schubart to be "a very talented poet, musician and orator". Schubart wrote "Die Forelle" in 1782, while imprisoned in the fortress of Hohenasperg; he was a prisoner there from 1777 to 1787 for insulting the mistress of Charles Eugene, Duke of Württemberg. The poem was published in the Schwäbischer Musenalmanach of 1783, consisting of four stanzas.

The Schubert scholar John Reed thought the poem to be "sentimental" and "feeble", with the final stanza of the poem consisting of a "smug moral" that "pointedly advises young girls to be on their guard against young men with rods". The academic Thomas Kramer observes that "Die Forelle" is "somewhat unusual with its mock-naive pretense of being about a bona fide fish", whereas he describes it as "a sexual parable". Fischer-Dieskau saw the poem as "didactic ... with its Baroque moral". Schubert did not set this final stanza, however, and instead concentrated on a person's observation of the trout and the reaction to its being caught by a fisherman.

Final stanza of "Die Forelle", omitted by Schubert: original and translation

Die ihr am goldnen Quelle
Der sichern Jugend weilt,
Denkt doch an die Forelle,
Seht ihr Gefahr, so eilt!
Meist fehlt ihr nur aus Mangel
Der Klugheit. Mädchen seht
Verführer mit der Angel!
Sonst blutet ihr zu spät.

You who tarry by the golden spring
Of secure youth,
Think still of the trout:
If you see danger, hurry by!
Most of you err only from lack
Of cleverness. Girls, see
Seducers with their tackle!
Or else, too late, you'll bleed.

== Creation ==
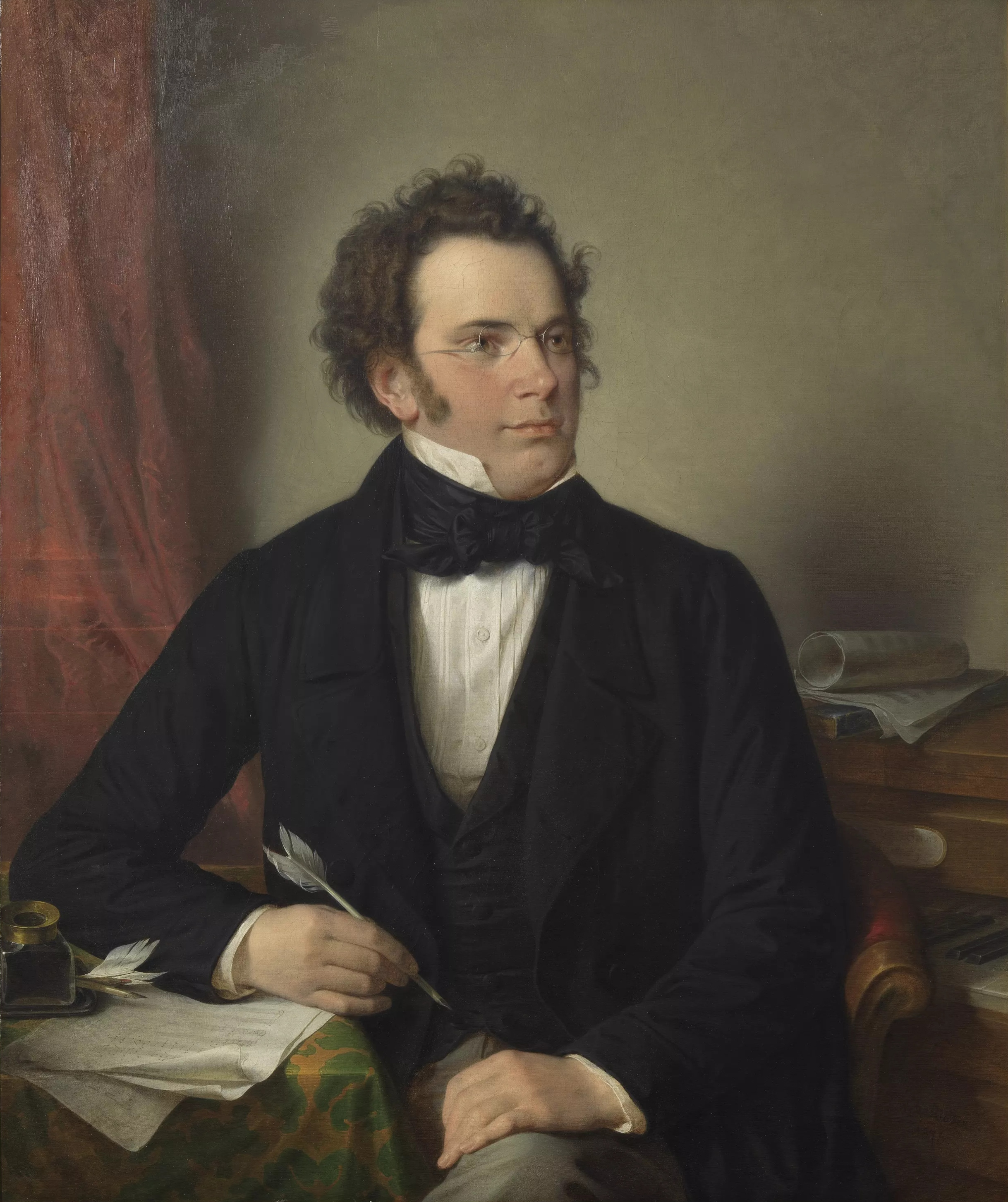
Schubert, by Wilhelm August Rieder, after an 1825 watercolour

In 1815 Schubert wrote a series of twenty songs based on the works of Ludwig Gotthard Kosegarten (1758–1818). Among them was "Die Erscheinung" (D 229), written in July that year; John Reed sees the song as a forerunner to "Die Forelle", observing that "Die Erscheinung" and other similar songs, "convey an intensity of feeling that belies their small scale". From the following year to 1821 Schubert composed four songs using the poems of Schubart, "An den Tod" (D518), "An mein Klavier" (D342), "Die Forelle" (D550) and "Grablied auf einen Soldaten" (D454). Although the first draft of "Die Forelle" was lost and the exact date of composition is unknown, the lied is known to have been written in early 1817, (Note: The pianist and Lieder accompanist Graham Johnson puts the date of composition to early 1817; Reed considers spring 1817 to be the date; while Fischer-Dieskau dates it to mid-1817.) the same year he composed "Der Tod und das Mädchen" and "An die Musik".

After Schubert completed the song, one of his friends, Johann Leopold Ebner, recounted that Schubert was told that "Die Forelle" unconsciously quoted Beethoven's Coriolan Overture; on hearing the comparison, Schubert decided to destroy the manuscript, but he was stopped by Ebner and others. On 9 December 1820 the song was published in a supplement to the Wiener Zeitung, along with a number of others of Schubert's lieder. He received no payment for publishing his songs, but was provided with free publicity.

== Composition ==
"Die Forelle" is written for solo voice and piano in the key of D♭ major. The song is written with a varied (or modified) strophic structure, meaning the "verse music" is generally the same, with one different verse. According to the American historian Mark Ringer, Schubert used a "musical structure that reflects both the life cycle of the earth and the progress from innocence to experience". Schubert directed the piece to be played "Etwas lebhaft", or at a "somewhat lively" pace.

The different verse is the third, and it demonstrates the "admixture of dramatic traits" in the lyrical song, which Fischer-Dieskau calls "a classic example of the strophic song with Abgesang ... 'after-strain'." The "after-strain" comes at the final stanza; the composer and Schubert scholar Brian Newbould observed that for three-quarters of the song's final stanza, Schubert departed from the strophe to give a musical impression of the trout being caught, but returned to the strophe for the final couplet. The primary rhythmic figure in the piano accompaniment suggests the movement of the fish in the water. When the fisherman catches the trout, the vocal line changes from major to minor, the piano figuration becomes darker and the flowing phrases are "broken by startled rests". According to Mark Ringer, the melody evokes a "folklike naïveté" that "delivers both delight and emotional power".

Schubart's poem takes the viewpoint of a male speaker, advising women to be careful of young men. By removing the stanza, Schubert removes the moral and creates uncertainty in the sex of the narrator.

== Variations ==
After completing his original in 1817, Schubert made six subsequent autographs. (Note: A musical "autograph" is a manuscript written in the composer's hand writing.) These differing versions were not necessarily an attempt to improve a work, with some later versions being written from memory with only minor variations; Newbould considers that Schubert's close replication was a "feat of musicianship ... and a sign that Schubert spoke the language of music with the naturalness of conversation." The differences between the autographs are small: according to Reed, they "are concerned ... with the tempo indication and the prelude – postlude." The first version, marked Mässig, (Note: Mässig translates as "moderately".) has no introduction, although "the shape of the familiar introduction is already adumbrated in a seven-bar postlude". The draft is undated, although is from 1817 and is kept in the Stadler, Ebner and Schindler collection in Lund. A second copy, written in May or June 1817, was for Franz Sales Kandler's album: this version was marked Nicht zu geschwind (not too fast).

A third variation was written during the night of 21 February 1818. Schubert and Anselm Hüttenbrenner, a friend and fellow composer, had finished a few bottles of Hungarian wine when Anselm commented that his brother Josef was an aficionado of Schubert's work. Schubert completed a copy of "Die Forelle" that was "somewhat messy". The messiness was partly accounted for by Schubert's drunken state, but also explained by the accompanying note he wrote to Josef: "Just as, in my haste, I was going to send the thing, I rather sleepily took up the ink-well and poured it calmly over it. What a disaster!" The manuscript was held by the Hüttenbrenner family for a number of years and was photographed in 1870, before being lost. Schubert wrote a further version in 1820 for publication in the Wiener Zeitung, and a final copy in October 1821 for publication in the Neue Ausgabe. The final version has "a five-bar piano prelude" and is presently in the Gertrude Clarke Whittall Foundation Collection of the Library of Congress.

In 1819 Sylvester Baumgartner—a music patron and amateur cellist in Steyr—commissioned Schubert to write a piece of chamber music based on "Die Forelle"; Schubert then wrote a quintet for piano and strings in which he quoted the song in a set of variations in the fourth movement. The piece later became known as the Trout Quintet (D. 667). Franz Liszt transcribed and paraphrased "Die Forelle" in two versions for solo piano. The first was in 1844 as the sixth part of his composition Sechs Melodien von Franz Schubert (S 563); the second transcription was in 1846 (S 564).

== Reception ==
Information regarding the contemporary reception to "Die Forelle" is scant. Reed relates that the song had "immediate popularity", and that Schubert composing the Trout Quintet was evidence that "Die Forelle" "was already widely known" by 1819. Newbould agrees, pointing out that the quintet was "acknowledging the song's meteoric rise up early nineteenth-century Vienna's equivalent to the charts". Fischer-Dieskau takes a longer-term view of the song's popularity, writing that "the vividness of the imagery, with the alternate troubling and smoothing of the surface of the water along with the exuberance of the melody itself, account for the song's universal appeal".

In the modern day, the song has been used as the ending tune of Samsung washing machines.

== Notes and references ==
=== Sources ===
- Arnold, Ben (2002). The Liszt Companion. Westport, Connecticut: Greenwood Publishing Group. ISBN 978-0-313-30689-1.
- Campbell, Frank C. (August 1949). "Schubert Song Autographs in the Whittall Collection". Quarterly Journal of Current Acquisitions. Library of Congress. 6 (4): 3–8. JSTOR 29780551.
- Chusid, Martin (1997). "Schubert's Chamber Music: Before and After Beethoven". In Gibbs, Christopher (ed.). The Cambridge Companion to Schubert. Cambridge Companions to Music. Cambridge: Cambridge University Press. ISBN 978-0-521-48424-4.
- Clive, Peter (1997). Schubert and His World: A Biographical Dictionary. Oxford: Clarendon Press. ISBN 978-0-19-816582-8.
- Fischer-Dieskau, Dietrich (1978). Schubert's Songs: A Biographical Study. translated by Kenneth S. Whitton. New York: Alfred A. Knopf. ISBN 0-394-48048-1.
- Forelle, Die. Grove Music Online. Oxford: Oxford University Press. January 2011. ISBN 978-0-19-957903-7. (subscription required)
- Hirsch, Marjorie Wing (1993). Schubert's Dramatic Lieder. Cambridge: Cambridge University Press. ISBN 0-521-41820-8.
- Johnson, Graham (1994). Notes to Hyperion CD "Schubert in 1817–1818" (Media notes). Edith Mathis. London: Hyperion Records. CDJ33021.
- Jackson, Stephen (1996). Franz Schubert: An Essential Guide to his Life and Works. London: Pavilion Books. ISBN 978-1-85793-987-3.
- Kramer, Lawrence (2003). Franz Schubert: Sexuality, Subjectivity, Song. Cambridge: Cambridge University Press. ISBN 978-0-521-54216-6.
- Lee Clark, Solee (2008). Franz Liszt's Pianistic Approach to Franz Schubert's Songs: "Muellerlieder" LW. A128. Ann Arbor, Michigan. ISBN 978-0-549-78981-9.
- McKay, Elizabeth Norman (1996). Franz Schubert: A Biography. Oxford: Clarendon Press. ISBN 978-0-19-816681-8.
- "Some of the Less-Known Songs of Schubert". The Musical Times. 69 (1027): 839–840. 1 September 1928. doi:10.2307/915575. JSTOR 915575. (subscription required)
- Montgomery, David (2003). Franz Schubert's Music in Performance: Compositional Ideals, Notational Intent, Historical Realities, Pedagogical Foundations. Hillsdale, New York: Pendragon Press. ISBN 978-1-57647-025-1.
- Newbould, Brian (1999). Schubert: The Music and the Man. Berkeley, California: University of California Press. ISBN 978-0-520-21957-1.
- "Notated Music: Die Forelle". Library of Congress.
- Randel, Don Michael (2003). The Harvard Dictionary of Music. Cambridge, Massachusetts: Harvard University Press. ISBN 978-0-674-01163-2.
- Reed, John (1997a). The Schubert Song Companion. Manchester: Manchester University Press. ISBN 978-1-901341-00-3.
- Reed, John (1997b). Schubert. Oxford: Oxford University Press. ISBN 978-0-19-816494-4.
- Ringer, Mark (2009). Schubert's Theater of Song: A Listener's Guide. Milwaukee, Wisconsin: Amadeus Press. ISBN 978-1-57467-176-6.
- Saffle, Michael (1998). Liszt and His World: Proceedings of the International Liszt Conference Held at Virginia Polytechnic Institute and State University, 20–23 May 1993. Maesteg: Pendragon Press. ISBN 978-0-945193-34-0.
- Solomon, Maynard (November 1979). "Schubert and Beethoven". 19th-Century Music. 3 (2). Berkeley, California: University of California Press: 114–125. doi:10.2307/746283. JSTOR 746283.
- Stradner, Gerhard (2006). Carter, Stewart Arlen (ed.). Brass Scholarship in Review: Proceedings of the Historic Brass Society Conference, Cité de la Musique, Paris, 1999. Hillsdale, New York: Pendragon Press. ISBN 978-1-57647-105-0.
- Wigmore, Richard (1988). Schubert: The Complete Song Texts. London: Victor Gollancz Ltd. ISBN 978-0-575-03961-2.
- Woodford, Peggy (1978). Schubert: His Life and Times. Tunbridge Wells: Midas Books. ISBN 978-0-85936-095-1.
