= Paris pour un beefsteak =

1870 song with lyrics by Émile Dereux

Paris pour un beefsteak is a song written during and about the siege of Paris (1870–71), on 15 October 1870, by Émile Deureux, in Blanqui's journal La Patrie en danger using the music of Te souviens-tu? originally composed by Joseph-Denis Doche.

== Lyrics ==
French original	English translation
Vive la Paix ! La France est aux enchères ; Demain, bourgeois, vous pourrez regoinfrer. Bismarck attend au Château de Ferrières; Que dans Paris, Thiers lui dise d’entrer. Favre griffonne un dernier protocole, Trochu renonce à son plan incompris… 𝄆 Allons Brébant, tourne la casserole Pour un beefsteak, on va vendre Paris. 𝄆	Long live peace! France is to be sold ; Tomorrow, bourgeois, you can engorge yourselves again. Bismarck awaits at the Château de Ferrières, For Thiers to tell him to enter. Favre scribbles a final protocol, Trochu renounces his futile plan... 𝄆 Come on Brébant, stir the pan, For a beefsteak, we'll sell Paris. 𝄆
Que font à moi l’Alsace et la Lorraine ? Dans ces pays, je n’ai ni champ ni bien. Que le Prussien nous les laisse ou les prenne, Je m’en bats l’œil, car je n’y perdrais rien. Plus que Strasbourg, ma table m’intéresse : Metz ne vaut pas une aile de perdrix ; 𝄆 Et puis, tout ça fait bouder ma maîtresse… Pour un beefsteak, messieurs, rendons Paris. 𝄆	What matters to me Alsace and Lorraine ? In those lands, I haven't fields nor property. Whether the Prussian leaves them or takes them, I won't care, for I will lose nothing. My table interests me more than Strasbourg, Metz worth no more than a partridge wing 𝄆 And besides, it all makes my mistress sulk... For a beafsteak, men, let's surrender Paris. 𝄆
J’entends des fous parler de résistance, De lutte à mort, de patrie et d’honneur ! Mon ventre seul exige une vengeance : Sous le nombril j’ai descendu mon cœur. Libre aux manants de rester patriotes, Et de mourir sous les feux ennemis ; 𝄆 Moi, j’aime mieux la sauce aux échalotes… Pour un beefsteak, messieurs, rendons Paris. 𝄆	I hear madmen talk of resistance, a struggle to death, fatherland and honour! My belly alone demands revenge, Below my navel, I have lowered my heart. These peasants are free to be patriots, And to die under enemy fire. 𝄆 I myself prefer shallot sauce... For a beefsteak, men, let's surrender Paris. 𝄆
On dit encor que la France est mourante ; Que l’étranger lui ronge les deux flancs ; Et que partout, sous leur botte sanglante, Comme des serfs, nous courbent les uhlans. Pleure qui veut de cette scène amère, Mais que la paix mette fin à ces cris ! 𝄆 La viande manque chez ma cuisinière… Pour un beefsteak, messieurs, rendons Paris. 𝄆	It is said that France is dying, That the foreigner gnaws at both her flanks. And that everywhere, before their bloody boot, we bow to the Uhlans like serfs. Cry, who wish to cry, before this bitter scene, But peace shall put an end to these cries! 𝄆 My cooker has run out of steak For a beefsteak, men, let's surrender Paris. 𝄆
Allons, c’est dit, bobonne, fais toilette ; Au salon bleu remets des rideaux neufs. Et toi, Manon, va battre l’omelette : Grâce aux Prussiens, nous mangerons des œufs. Je veux demain recevoir à ma table Trois Bavarois, et je veux qu’on soit gris… 𝄆 Vive la paix ! la Patrie est au diable ! Pour un beefsteak, on a rendu Paris. 𝄆	Come on dear, it's been decided, ready yourself, then put up new curtains in the blue room. And you, my cherished, go beat the omelette, Thanks to the Prussians, we will eat eggs. I want to receive at my table, Three Bavarians, then we shall get drunk. 𝄆 Long live peace! Hell to the fatherland! For a beefsteak, we've surrendered Paris. 𝄆
