= Francesco Ricci (mathematician) =

Italian economist and mathematician

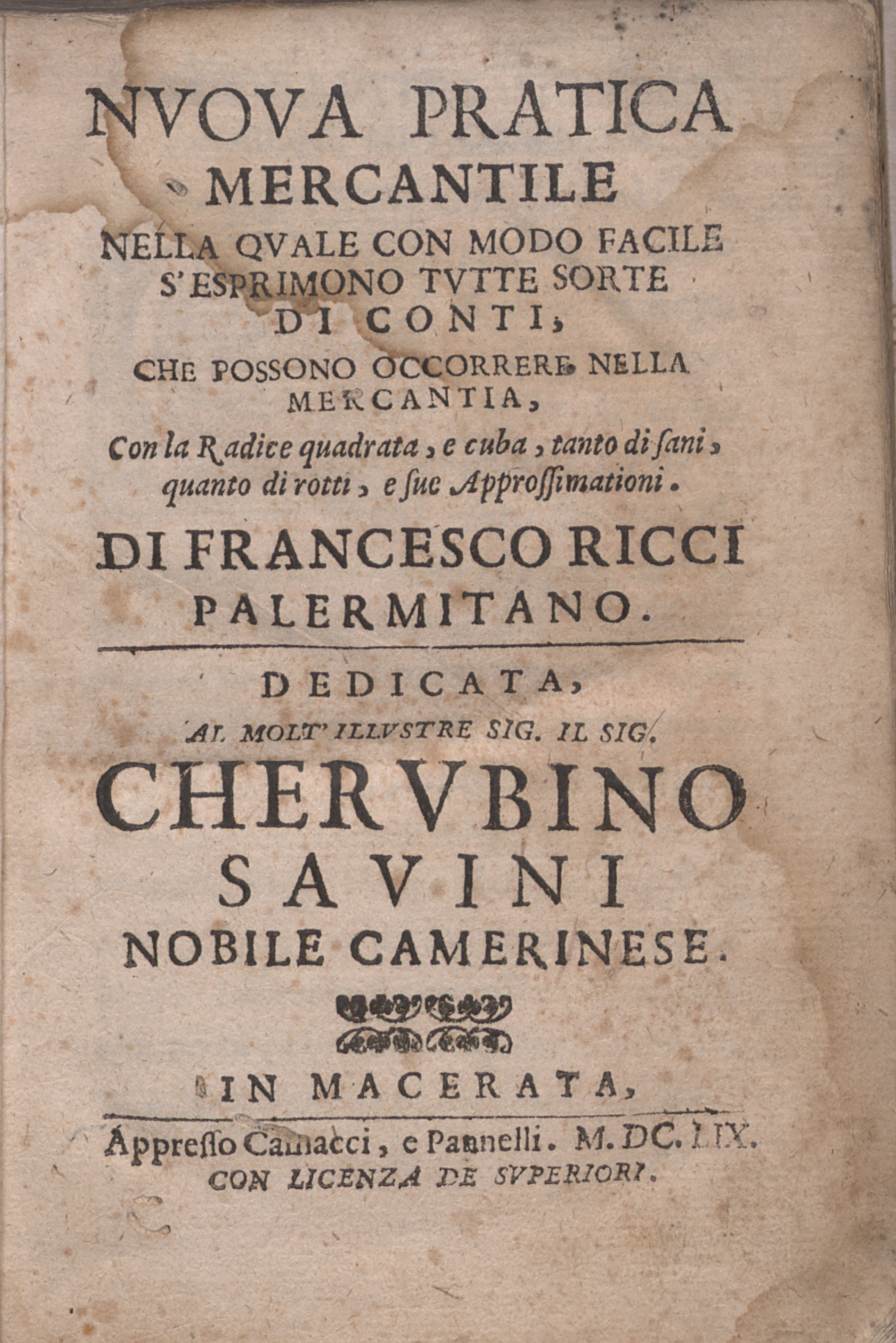
Nuova pratica mercantile (1659)

Francesco Ricci was a 17th-century Italian economist and mathematician from Palermo.

== Works ==
- Nuova pratica mercantile [New Mercantile Practice] (in Italian). Macerata: Carlo Antonio Camacci & Giacomo Filippo Pannelli. 1659.
- Tesoro aritmetico [Arithmetic Treasure] (in Italian). Urbino. 1667.
