= Christian Friedrich Daniel Schubart =

German poet and musician (1739–1791)

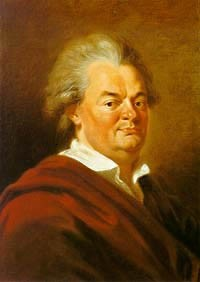
Christian Friedrich Daniel Schubart

Christian Friedrich Daniel Schubart (24 March 1739 – 10 October 1791) was a German poet, organist, composer, and journalist. He was repeatedly punished for his social-critical writing and spent ten years in severe conditions in jail.

== Life ==
Born at Obersontheim in Swabia, he entered the University of Erlangen in 1758 as a student of theology. He led a dissolute life, and after two years' stay was summoned home by his parents. After attempting to earn a livelihood as private tutor and as assistant preacher, his musical talents gained him the appointment of organist in Geislingen an der Steige. Meeting Schubart in Ludwigsburg in 1772, Charles Burney called him "the first, real great harpsichord player that I had hitherto met with in Germany ... He is formed on the Bach school; but is an enthusiast, and original in genius. Many of his pieces are printed in Holland; they are full of taste and fire. He played on the clavichord, with great delicacy and expression; his finger is brilliant, and fancy rich." Schubart was unappreciated in Ludwigsburg, according to Burney: "The common people think him mad, and the rest overlook him." As a consequence of his wild life and blasphemy, found expressed in a parody of the litany, he was later expelled from the country.

He then visited in turn Heilbronn, Mannheim, Munich and Augsburg. In Augsburg, he made a considerable stay, began his Deutsche Chronik (German Chronicle, 1774–1778) and eked out a subsistence by reciting from the latest works of prominent poets.

In 1775, Schubart witnessed a piano playing competition in Munich between Wolfgang Amadeus Mozart and Franz Ignaz von Beecke. He wrote in his Teutsche Chronik (27 April 1775) that in his opinion, von Beecke played far better than Mozart: "In Munich... I heard two of the greatest clavier players, Mr Mozart and Captain von Beecke. Mozart’s playing had great weight, and he read at sight everything that we put before him. But no more than that; Beecke surpasses him by a long way. Winged agility, grace and melting sweetness."

Owing to a bitter attack upon the Jesuits, he was expelled from Augsburg and fled to Ulm, where he was arrested in 1777 and confined in the fortress of Hohenasperg.

Here he met with lenient treatment, and he spent the time by a study of mystical works and in composing poetry. His Sämtliche Gedichte (Complete Poems) appeared in two volumes at Stuttgart in 1785/1786 (new edition by Gustav Hauff, Leipzig, 1884, in Reclams Universal-Bibliothek); in this collection most of the pieces are characterized by the "Sturm und Drang" period. One of the poems he wrote there and published in the Schwäbischer Musen-Almanach in 1783 was Die Forelle (The Trout), set to music by Franz Schubert in 1817.

He was set free in 1787 by Frederick the Great, king of Prussia, and expressed his gratitude in "Hymnus auf Friedrich den Grossen" ("Hymn to Frederick the Great"). Schubart was now appointed musical director and manager of the theatre at Stuttgart, where he continued his Deutsche Chronik and began his autobiography, Schubarts Leben und Gesinnungen ("Schubart's Life and Thoughts", 2 vols, 1791–1793), but he died before its completion in Stuttgart. His Gesammelte Schriften und Schicksale (Collected Writings and Fates) appeared in 8 volumes (Stuttgart, 1839–1840).

Among Schubart's musical works are the operetta Die glücklichen Reisenden, the melodrama Evas Klage bei des Messias Tod, three books of Musikalische Rhapsodien (1786), a "Salve Regina", and various songs and keyboard pieces.
