= Trout Quintet =

Piano quintet by Franz Schubert

Piano Quintet in A major
- Trout Quintet
- by Franz Schubert
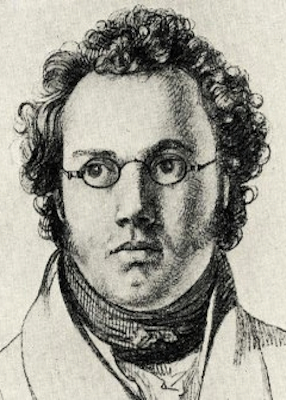
- 1821 drawing of Franz Schubert by Joseph Kupelwieser
- Key: A major
- Catalogue: D. 667
- Occasion: Commissioned by Sylvester Paumgartner
- Composed: 1819
- Published: 1829
- Duration: 35–43 minutes
- Movements: five

The Trout Quintet (Forellenquintett) is the popular name for the Piano Quintet in A major, D. 667, by Franz Schubert. The piano quintet was composed in 1819, when he was 22 years old; it was not published, however, until 1829, a year after his death.

Rather than the usual piano quintet ensemble of piano and string quartet, the Trout Quintet is written for piano, violin, viola, cello and double bass.

According to Schubert's friend Albert Stadler, it was modelled on an arrangement of Johann Nepomuk Hummel's then-popular Septet in D Minor for Flute, Oboe, Horn, Viola, Cello, Bass and Piano, Op. 74. That arrangement, using the same, somewhat unusual instrumentation chosen by Schubert, had been published in Vienna in about 1817, only a few years before the composition of the Trout Quintet. It may also have been influenced by Hummel's Quintet in E flat minor, Op. 87 .

== Nickname ==
The piece is known as the Trout because the fourth movement is a set of variations on Schubert's earlier Lied "Die Forelle" ("The Trout"). The quintet was written for Sylvester Paumgartner, a wealthy music patron and amateur cellist from Steyr, Upper Austria, who also suggested that Schubert include a set of variations on the Lied. Sets of variations on melodies from his Lieder are found in four other works by Schubert: the Death and the Maiden Quartet, the "Trockne Blumen" (dried flowers) Variations for Flute and Piano (D. 802), the Wanderer Fantasy, and the Fantasia for Violin and Piano in C major (D. 934, on "Sei mir gegrüßt").

== Analysis ==
The quintet consists of five movements:

1. Allegro vivace (A major)
2. Andante (F major)
3. Scherzo: Presto (A major)
4. Andantino – Allegretto (D major)
5. Allegro giusto (A major)

The rising sextuplet figure from the song's accompaniment is used as a unifying motif throughout the quintet, and related figures appear in four out of the five movements – all but the Scherzo. As in the song, the figure is usually introduced by the piano, ascending.

=== I. Allegro vivace ===
The first movement is in sonata form. As is commonplace in works of the Classical genre, the exposition shifts from tonic to dominant; however, Schubert's harmonic language is innovative, incorporating many mediants and submediants. This is evident from almost the beginning of the piece: after stating the tonic for ten bars, the harmony shifts abruptly into F major (the flatted submediant) in the eleventh bar.

The development section starts with a similar abrupt shift, from E major (at the end of the exposition) to C major. Harmonic movement is slow at first, but becomes quicker; towards the return of the first theme, the harmony modulates in ascending half tones.

The recapitulation begins in the subdominant, making any modulatory changes in the transition to the second theme unnecessary, a frequent phenomenon in early sonata form movements written by Schubert. It differs from the exposition only in omitting the opening bars and another short section, before the closing theme.

=== II. Andante ===
This movement is composed of two symmetrical sections, the second being a transposed version of the first, except for some differences of modulation which allow the movement to end in the same key in which it began. Tonal layout (with some intermediate keys of lower structural significance omitted) as follows:

F major – F♯ minor – D major – G major – G minor – G major; A♭ major – A minor – F major – F minor – F major

=== III. Scherzo: Presto ===
This movement also contains mediant tonalities, such as the ending of the first section of the Scherzo proper, which is in C major, the flattened mediant, or the relative major of the parallel minor (A minor).

=== IV. Andantino – Allegretto ===
The fourth movement is a theme and variations on Schubert's Lied "Die Forelle". As typical of some other variation movements by Schubert (in contrast to Beethoven's style), the variations do not transform the original theme into new thematic material; rather, they concentrate on melodic decoration and changes of mood. In each of the first few variations, the main theme is played by a different instrument or group. In the fifth variation, Schubert begins in the flat submediant (B♭ major), and creates a series of modulations eventually leading back to the movement's main key, at the beginning of the final sixth variation.

A similar process is heard in three of Schubert's later compositions: the Octet in F major, D. 803 (fourth movement); the Piano Sonata in A minor, D. 845 (second movement); and the Impromptu in B♭ major, D. 935 No. 3. The concluding variation is similar to the original Lied, sharing the same characteristic accompaniment in the piano.

=== V. Allegro giusto ===
The Finale is in two symmetrical sections, like the second movement. However, the movement differs from the second movement in the absence of unusual chromaticism, and in the second section being an exact transposition of the first (except for some changes of octave register). A repeat sign is written for the first section: if one adheres meticulously to the score, the movement consists of three lengthy, almost identical repeats of the same musical material. Performers sometimes choose to omit the repeat of the first section when playing.

Although this movement lacks the chromaticism of the second movement, its own harmonic design is also innovative: the first section ends in D major, the subdominant. This is contradictory to the aesthetics of the Classical musical style, in which the first major harmonic event in a musical piece or movement, is the shift from tonic to dominant (or, more rarely, to mediant or submediant – but never to the subdominant).

== Musical significance ==
Compared to other major chamber works by Schubert, such as the last three string quartets and the string quintet, the Trout Quintet is a leisurely work, characterized by lower structural coherence, especially in its outer movements and the Andante. These movements contain unusually long repetitions of previously stated material, sometimes transposed, with little or no structural reworking, aimed at generating an overall unified dramatic design ("mechanical" in Martin Chusid's words).

The importance of the piece stems mainly from its use of an original and innovative harmonic language, rich in mediants and chromaticism, and from its timbral characteristics. The Trout Quintet has a unique sonority among chamber works for piano and strings, due mainly to the piano part, which for substantial sections of the piece concentrates on the highest register of the instrument, with both hands playing the same melodic line an octave apart (having been freed to do so by the inclusion of both cello and bass in the ensemble). Such writing also occurs in other chamber works by Schubert, such as the piano trios, but to a much lesser extent, and is characteristic of Schubert's works for piano four-hands, one of his most personal musical genres. Such timbral writing may have influenced the works of Romantic composers such as Frédéric Chopin, who admired Schubert's music for piano four-hands.

The quintet forms the basis of Christopher Nupen's 1969 film The Trout, in which Itzhak Perlman, Pinchas Zukerman, Jacqueline du Pré, Daniel Barenboim and Zubin Mehta perform it at Queen Elizabeth Hall in London.

== Other uses ==
A portion of the Trout Quintet's fifth movement, performed by the Nash Ensemble, is used as the theme music for the BBC television comedy Waiting for God. The third movement performed by the Nash Ensemble is also used in the show.

Samsung washing machines and clothes dryers play an arrangement of the first portion of the fourth movement upon finishing a spin cycle.

In the 2019 motion picture Rocketman, from 18:23 to 18:47, an excerpt of the Trout Quintet can be heard, while using mannerisms that separated Elton from a typical classical musician into a rock style of playing.
