= Te souviens-tu? =

French post-Napoleonic song

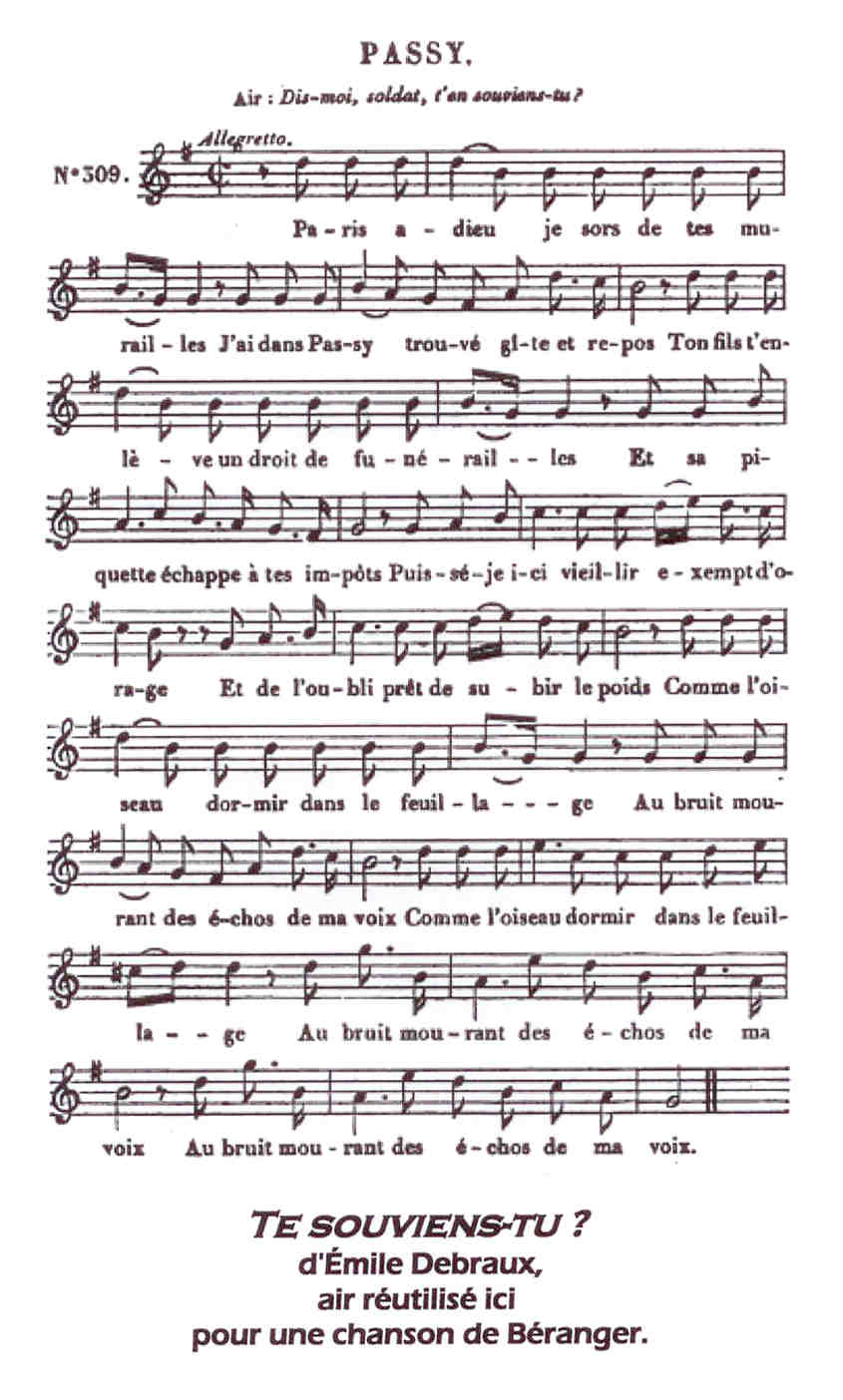
Nineteenth century sheet music.

Te souviens-tu? (lit. 'Do you remember?') is a French song composed in 1817 with lyrics by Émile Debraux and music by Joseph-Denis Doche. A variation was produced by Pierre-Jean de Béranger. It is also known under the title T'en souviens-tu?. Composed during the Seventh Coalition's occupation of France following its defeat in the Hundred Days, it describes a former officer of the Grande Armée running into an old comrade who once saved his life begging in the streets. He sings of the glories once achieved by Napoleon's troops in their past campaigns.

== Lyrics ==
| French | English translation |
|---|---|
| Te souviens-tu, disait un capitaine, Au vétéran qui mendiait son pain Te souviens-tu qu'autrefois dans la plaine Tu détournas un sabre de mon sein? Sous les drapeaux d'une mère chérie Tous deux jadis nous avons combattu Je m'en souviens, car je te dois la vie: Mais, toi soldat, dis-moi, t'en souviens-tu? Je m'en souviens, car je te dois la vie: Mais, toi soldat, dis-moi, t'en souviens-tu? | Do you remember, said a captain to the veteran who begged for his bread, do you remember that once on the plain, you turned a sword from my bosom? Under the banners of a dear mother, We both fought in the past; I remember it, for I owe you my life: But you, soldier, tell me, do you remember it? I remember it, for I owe you my life: But you, soldier, tell me, do you remember it? |
| Te souviens-tu de ces jours trop rapide Où le français acquit tant de renom? Te souviens-tu que sur les pyramides Chacun de nous osa graver son nom? Malgré les vents, malgré la terre et l'onde, On vit flotter, après l'avoir vaincu Notre étendard sur le berceau du monde: Dis-moi, soldat, dis-moi, t'en souviens-tu? | Do you remember those too quick days, when the Frenchman acquired so much fame! Do you remember that on the pyramids Each of us dared to engrave his name? In spite of the winds, in spite of the earth and the waves, We saw flying, after having conquered him, Our standards on the cradle of the world: Tell me, soldier, tell me, do you remember? |
| Te souviens-tu que les preux d'Italie; Ont vainement combattu contre nous? Te souviens-tu que les preux d'Ibérie; Devant nos chefs ont plié les genoux? Te souviens-tu qu'aux champs de l'Allemagne; Nos bataillons arrivant impromptu, En quatre jours ont fait une campagne: Dis-moi, soldat, dis-moi, t'en souviens-tu? | Do you remember that the valiant men of Italy fought in vain against us? Do you remember that the valiant men of Iberia bowed their knees before our chiefs? Do you remember that in the fields of Germany; Our battalions, arriving unexpectedly, In four days made a campaign: Tell me, soldier, tell me, do you remember? |
| Te souviens-tu de ces plaines glacées Où le français, abordant en vainqueur Vit sur son front les neiges amassées Glacer son corps sans refroidir son cœur? Souvent alors au milieu des alarmes Nos pleurs coulaient, mais notre œil abattu Brillait encore lorsqu'on volait aux armes: Dis-moi, soldat, dis-moi, t'en souviens-tu? | Do you remember those icy plains Which the French approached as victors, And on their foreheads the snows heaped To freeze their bodies without cooling their hearts? Often then, in the midst of alarms, Our tears flowed, but our downcast eye still shone when we flew to arms. Tell me, soldier, tell me, do you remember? |
| Te souviens-tu qu'un jour, notre patrie, Vivante encore, descendit au cercueil Et que l'on vit dans Lutèce flétrie Des étrangers marcher avec orgueil! Grave en ton cœur ce jour pour le maudire Et quand Bellone enfin aura paru, Qu'un chef jamais n'ait besoin de te dire Dis-moi, soldat, dis-moi, t'en souviens-tu? | Do you remember that one day our homeland Still alive, descended to the coffin, and that in the withered Lutetia we saw the strangers marching with pride? Keep this day in your heart to curse it, And when Bellona finally appears, Let no ruler ever need to say to you: Tell me, soldier, tell me, do you remember it? |
| Te souviens-tu... Mais ici ma voix tremble Car je n'ai plus de noble souvenir, Viens-t-en l'ami, nous pleurerons ensemble En attendant un meilleur avenir Mais si la mort, planant sur ma chaumière Me rappelait au repos qui m'est dû Tu fermeras doucement ma paupière En me disant: Soldat, t'en souviens-tu? | Do you remember?... But here my voice trembles, For I have no more noble memory; Soon, friend, we will weep together, Waiting for a better future. But if death, hovering over our cottages, Reminds me of the rest that is due to me, You will gently close my eyelid, Calling me Soldier, do you remember it? |

== Other versions ==
The melody for Te souviens-tu? would later be used for the German anti-war song Ich bin Soldat, doch bin ich es nicht gerne ("I am a soldier, but I do not like it"), written in 1870 by Max Kegel.

In 1870, a satirical song called Paris pour un beefsteak was also composed using the same music during the Siege of Paris.

From this song, Joseph-Denis Doche's tune was taken up and still used today for two Walloon songs that are very well known in dialectal Wallonia:

- Li trousers trawé (The holed trousers) by Charles du Vivier de Streel, which takes up the same canvas from the memories of a former member of the Grande Armée, originally from Liège.
- Lolote a popular love song by Jacques Bertrand, which has become a kind of regional anthem of the Charleroi region.

The tune is also taken, from Lolote, by the Belgian students for bawdy songs: Le fusil, L'ancien étudiant and the song of the students of the Faculty of Agricultural Sciences of Gembloux.

== Bibliography ==
- Day-Hickman, Barbara Ann. Napoleonic Art: Nationalism and the Spirit of Rebellion in France (1815–1848). University of Delaware Press, 1999.
- Rifkin, Adrian. Communards and Other Cultural Histories: Essays by Adrian Rifkin. BRILL, 2016.
