= 13 Variations on a theme by Anselm Hüttenbrenner =

The 13 Variations on a theme by Anselm Hüttenbrenner, D. 576, is a set of variations for the piano in A minor composed by Franz Schubert in 1817. The theme was composed by Anselm Hüttenbrenner for his first string quartet op. 3 in 1816, to whom it is also dedicated.

== History ==
The piece was written by Schubert in August 1817 and the autograph was owned by Johann von Herbeck. The variations were published the first time in 1867 by Carl Anton Spina in Vienna under the name „13 Variationen über ein Thema aus dem Violinquartett Nr. 1 von Anselm Hüttenbrenner" by Steiner & Comp. in Vienna.

== Structure ==
1. Theme (Andantino, A minor)
2. Var I (A minor)
3. Var II (A minor)
4. Var III (A minor)
5. Var IV (A minor)
6. Var V (A major)
7. Var VI (A major)
8. Var VII (A minor)
9. Var VIII (A minor)
10. Var IX (A major)
11. Var X (A minor)
12. Var XI (A minor)
13. Var XII (A minor)
14. Var XIII (Allegro, A major)

== Selected recordings ==
- 1969: Sviatoslav Richter
- 1971: Wilhelm Kempff
- 2009: Cyprien Katsaris
