= Émile Debraux =

French chansonnier and poet

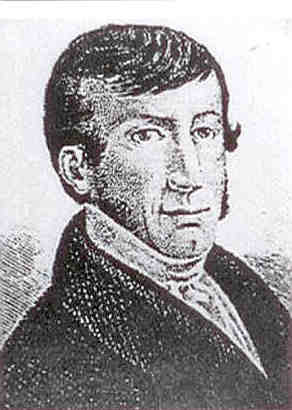
Émile Debraux

Paul Émile Debraux (30 August 1796 (Note: In the French Republican Calendar in use at the time of his birth, the date was recorded as "13 Fructidor Year IV") – 12 February 1831), commonly known simply as Émile Debraux, was a French writer, goguettier, poet and singer. He was born in Ancerville, Meuse and died 1831 in Paris. One of his better-known songs was Te souviens-tu? (1817) about two veterans of the Napoleonic Wars encountering each other in the street, composed during the Allied Occupation of France following the country's defeat.

== Biography ==
Paul-Émile Debraux was born in Ancerville (Meuse) on 13 Fructidor, Year IV (August 30, 1796). His father, Claude-Paul Debraux, a bailiff at the justice of the peace, moved to Paris with his family in 1797. He copied at the School of Medicine the indexes of dissertations, and held this position from 1798 to 1827.

He lived at No. 7 Rue de l'École-de-Médecine. After becoming a widower, he remarried on June 6, 1827, and died six years later, on April 30.

Paul-Émile was therefore born from the first marriage.

He studied at Imperial High School.

He studied at the Lycée Impérial. He was employed at the library of the School of Medicine. Henri Avenel, in his biography, wrote: “He remained in this position for only a short time, from 1816 to 1817.»
