= Der Tod und das Mädchen =

Song composed by Franz Schubert

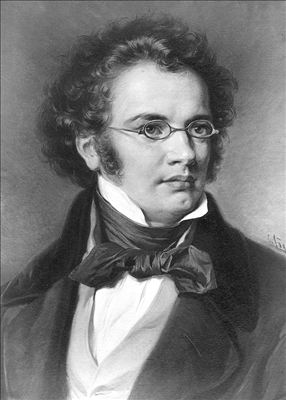
Franz Schubert, composer

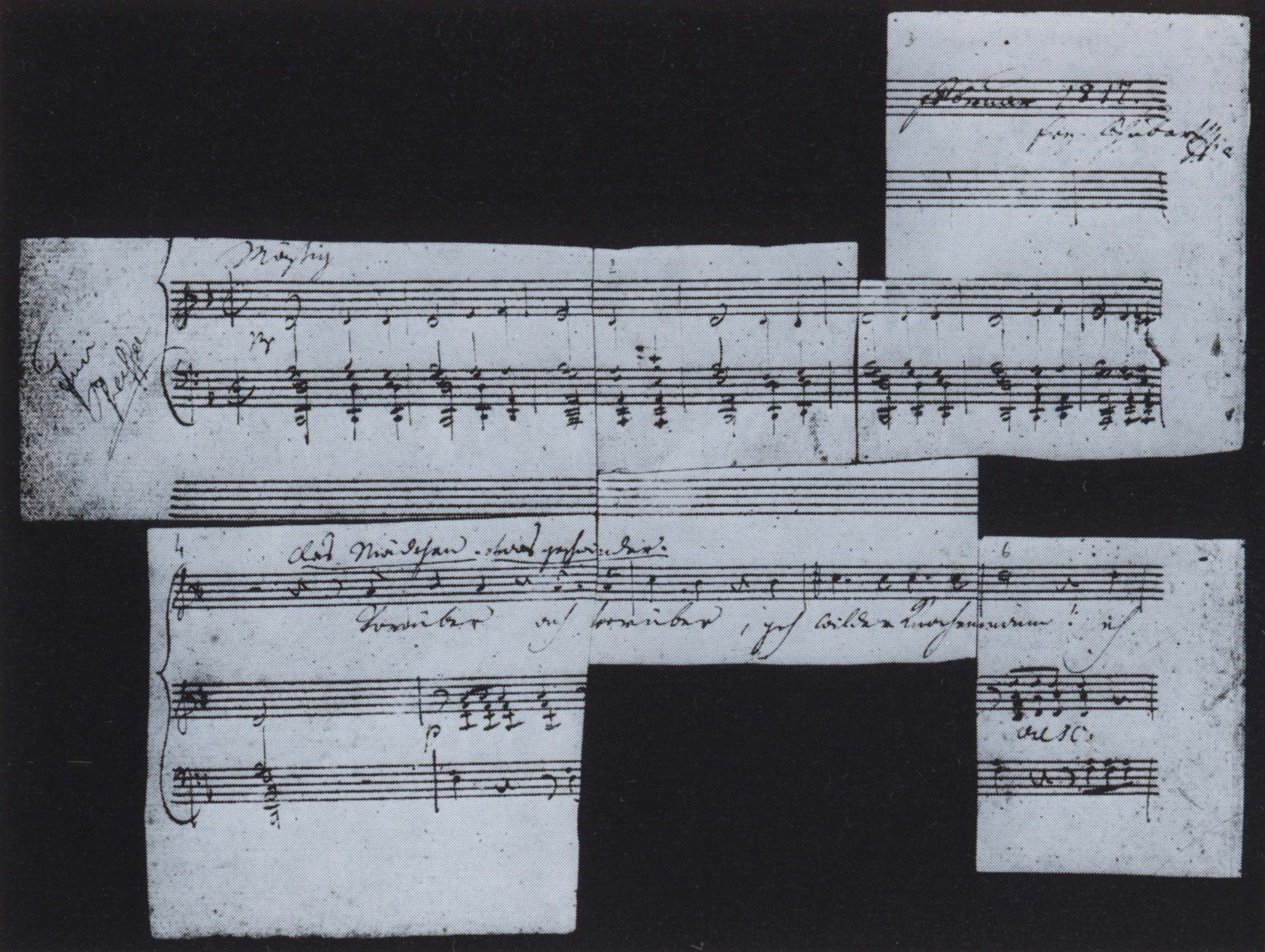
Original manuscript of "Death and the Maiden"

"Der Tod und das Mädchen" (German: [deːɐ̯ ˈtoːt ʔʊnt das ˈmɛːtçn̩], "Death and the Maiden"), D 531; Op. 7, No. 3, is a lied composed by Franz Schubert in February 1817. It was published by Cappi und Diabelli in Vienna in November 1821. The text is derived from a poem written by German poet Matthias Claudius. The song is set for voice and piano.

== Composition ==
The piece begins with an introduction in D minor; the first eight bars in the time signature 2/2. Both hands play chords. The section is quiet (pianissimo) and slow (mäßig), and presents the musical theme of Death.

The Maiden enters in the ninth bar on an anacrusis. This section is more agitated than the first; it is marked piano and "somewhat faster" (etwas geschwinder). The melody gradually increases in pitch, chromatically at points. The piano accompaniment is syncopated, playing chords of quavers alternating in the left and right hand. A diminished chord in the first bar of the third line (ich bin noch jung) creates an eerie mood. In the eighth bar of the maiden's song, on the word rühre ("touch"), the quavers stop and the rhythm of the opening section returns. Then an imperfect cadence leads to a rest with fermata. This brings the second section to a total of 13 bars in length.

The third and final section is Death's song. The music returns to the tempo and dynamics of the introduction. Death's melody has a narrow pitch range (save for the last note where the singer has the option of dropping to D below the melody line). The key modulates to F major, the relative major of D minor. With the last syllable of Death's song, the key changes into D major. The coda is almost a repeat of the introduction, except it is shortened by one bar and is now in the major key.

== Text ==
"Der Tod und das Mädchen"
Ernestine Schumann-Heink (1919)

German

Das Mädchen:
Vorüber! Ach, vorüber!
Geh, wilder Knochenmann!
Ich bin noch jung! Geh, Lieber,
Und rühre mich nicht an.
Und rühre mich nicht an.

Der Tod:
Gib deine Hand, du schön und zart Gebild!
Bin Freund, und komme nicht, zu strafen.
Sei gutes Muts! Ich bin nicht wild,
Sollst sanft in meinen Armen schlafen!

English

The Maiden:
Pass me by! Oh, pass me by!
Go, fierce man of bones!
I am still young! Go, dear,
And do not touch me.
And do not touch me.

Death:
Give me your hand, you beautiful and tender form!
I am a friend, and come not to punish.
Be of good cheer! I am not fierce,
Softly shall you sleep in my arms!

== See also ==
- The piano accompaniment from this song was used as the theme in the second movement (a theme and variations) of Schubert's Death and the Maiden Quartet (String Quartet No. 14 in D minor, D. 810) in 1824.
- The theme of the shadowy figure trying to touch a victim, and the victim fearing death at the figure's hands, is explored in some of Schubert's other works as well, notably in the lied Erlkönig, which itself uses the text of the poem by the same name by Johann Wolfgang von Goethe.
- The play and film versions of Death and the Maiden take their titles from the song.
