= Francesco Pasquale Ricci =

Italian composer and violinist

Francesco Pasquale Ricci (May 17, 1732 – November 7, 1817), was an Italian composer and violinist.

Ricci was born in Como. He traveled widely, and lived some time in Paris. Returning to Como, he became maestro di cappella at Como Cathedral in 1759. Six quintets of his were published in London in 1768 by Peter Welcker. Between 1764 and 1780 he was working in the Hague in the court orchestra of stadholder William V of Orange. There he wrote several works for the Prince and other members of the court. Ricci corrected the works of Josina van Boetzelaer, a surprising Dutch composer.

He co-authored a piano method with Johann Christian Bach, Méthode ou recueil de connaissances élémentaires pour le forte-piano ou clavecin ("Method or Collection of Elementary Studies for the Forte-piano or Harpsichord", 1786), Ricci providing the text and Bach the pieces. Ricci died in Como in 1817.
