= An die Musik =

1817 lied composed by Franz Schubert

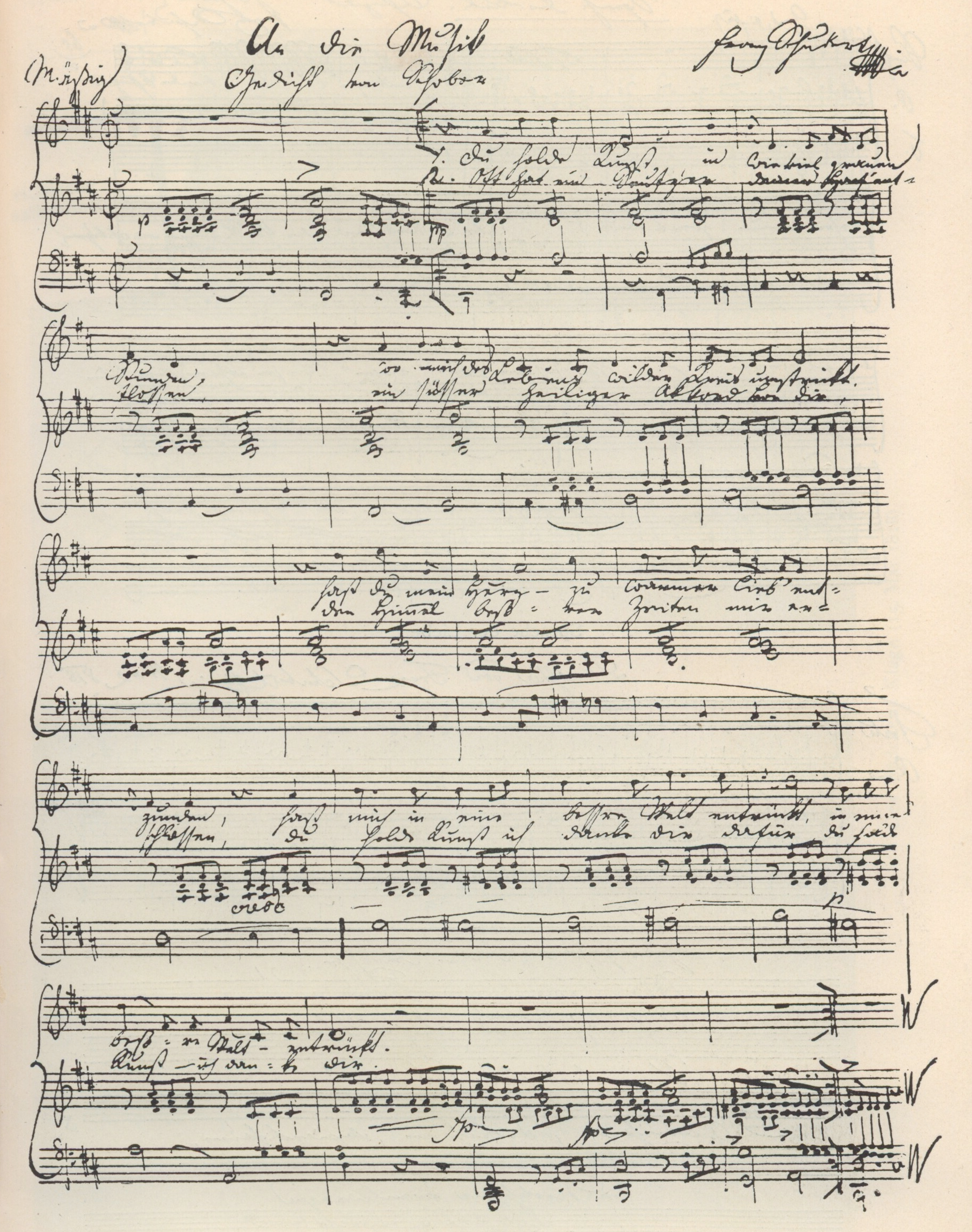
Manuscript of "An die Musik"

Franz Schubert composed his lied "An die Musik" (German for "To Music") in March 1817 for solo voice and piano, with text from a poem by his friend Franz von Schober. In the Deutsch catalog of Schubert's works it is number D547. The original key is D major. It was published in 1827 as Opus 88, No. 4, by Thaddäus Weigl. Schubert dedicated the song to the Viennese piano virtuoso Albert Sowinsky on April 24, 1827, a decade after he composed it.

A hymn to the art of music, it is one of the best-known songs by Schubert. Its greatness and popularity are generally attributed to its harmonic simplicity, sweeping melody, and a strong bass line that effectively underpins the vocal line. At the end of Gerald Moore's farewell concert in London's Royal Festival Hall in 1967, in which he accompanied Dietrich Fischer-Dieskau, Victoria de los Ángeles and Elisabeth Schwarzkopf, he came out onto the stage alone and played his piano-solo arrangement of "An die Musik" as his parting gift.

The poem was not included in the collected editions of Schober's poems, but there is a handwritten copy of it in Vienna. It resembles the second canto of Ernst Schulze's poem "Die bezauberte Rose" (The Enchanted Rose), a poem also known to Schubert as a possible basis for an opera; however, it was published in 1818, so it is unlikely that there was any connection between them for the composer.

== Text ==
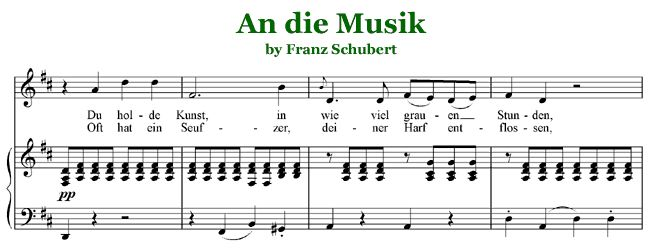
Incipit of "An die Musik"

"An die Musik", Adrien Poupin (tenor), Armelle Mathis (piano)

An die Musik

Du holde Kunst, in wieviel grauen Stunden,
Wo mich des Lebens wilder Kreis umstrickt,

Hast du mein Herz zu warmer Lieb' entzunden,
Hast mich in eine beßre Welt entrückt,
In eine beßre Welt entrückt!

Oft hat ein Seufzer deiner Harf' entfloßen,
Ein süßer, heiliger Akkord von dir,

Den Himmel beßrer Zeiten mir erschloßen,
Du holde Kunst, ich danke dir dafür,
Du holde Kunst, ich danke dir!

English translation

O blessed art, how often in dark hours,
When the savage ring of life tightens round me,

Have you kindled warm love in my heart,
Have transported me to a better world,
Transported to a better world!

Often a sigh has escaped from your harp,
A sweet, sacred harmony of yours,

Has opened up the heavens to better times for me,
O blessed art, I thank you for that,
O blessed art, I thank you!

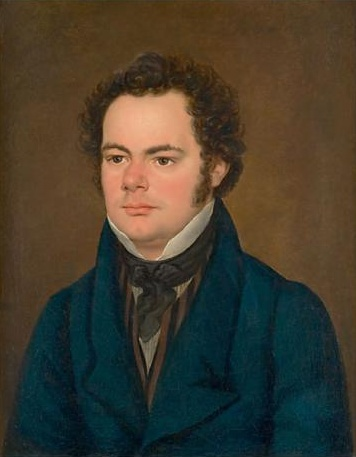
Portrait of Franz Schubert by Franz Eybl (1827)

== Footnotes ==
=== Sources ===
- Fischer-Dieskau, Dietrich (1978). Schubert's Songs: A Biographical Study. Translated by Kenneth S. Whitton. New York: Alfred A. Knopf. ISBN 0-394-48048-1.
- Reed, John (1985). The Schubert Song Companion. New York: Universe Books. pp. 36–37. ISBN 0-87663-477-3.
