= List of compositions by Franz Schubert =

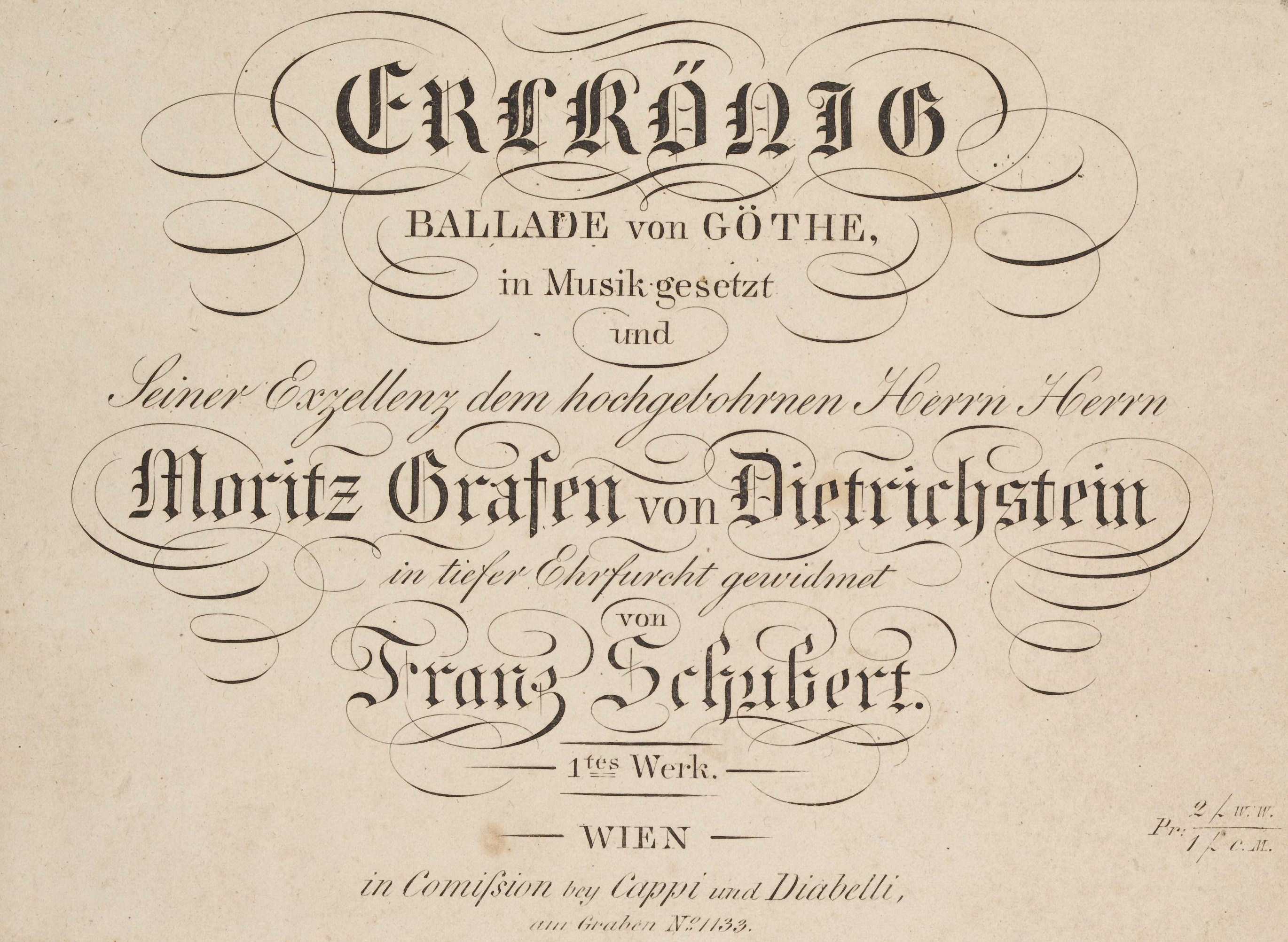
Schubert's Opus 1: "Erlkönig", D 328, fourth version, was published by Diabelli as Schubert's "1^{tes} Werk" (first work) in 1821. The Lied, composed by Schubert in 1815, was later adopted along with its prior versions as No. 178 in Series XX, Vol. 3 of the AGA (1895), and in Series IV, Vol. 1 of the NSE (1970).

Franz Schubert (31 January 1797 – 19 November 1828), a Viennese composer of the late Classical to early Romantic eras, left a very extensive body of work notwithstanding his short life. He wrote over 1,500 items, or, when collections, cycles and variants are grouped, some thousand compositions. The largest group are his over six hundred Lieder for solo voice and piano. He composed nearly as many piano pieces, and further some 150 part songs, some 40 liturgical compositions (including several masses) and around 20 stage works like operas and incidental music. His orchestral output includes thirteen symphonies (seven completed) and several overtures. Schubert's chamber music includes over 20 string quartets, and several quintets, trios and duos.

Otto Erich Deutsch compiled the first comprehensive catalogue of Schubert's works and published it in 1951 as Schubert: Thematic Catalogue of all his Works in Chronological Order. A revised edition appeared in German in 1978. Later editions of the catalogue contained minor updates.

Publication of Schubert's compositions started during his lifetime, by opus number. After the composer's death, posthumous opus numbers continued to be assigned to new publications of his work until 1867 (Op. post. 173). Meanwhile, publications without opus number had also started. For instance, from shortly after the composer's death, the many songs in Diabelli's fifty Nachlaß-Lieferung (installment from the heritage) editions.

There are two attempts to publish everything Schubert has composed in a single edition:

- From 1884 to 1897 Breitkopf & Härtel published twenty-two series of Franz Schubert's Werke: Kritisch durchgesehene Gesammtausgabe, known as the Alte Gesamt-Ausgabe (AGA, the former complete edition). From 1965 Dover Publications started to reprint this edition, and later it was made available at the IMSLP website.
- The Neue Schubert-Ausgabe (NSA), also known as the New Schubert Edition (NSE), is published by Bärenreiter (Kassel). Plans for this edition began as early as 1963, with the foundation of the International Schubert Society, headquartered at the University of Tübingen, Germany. 81 of the edition's projected 101 volumes were published by early May 2015, and it is scheduled to conclude in 2027.

Websites such as Schubert Online (schubert-online.at) provide facsimiles (scans) of Schubert's autographs and of other manuscripts and early editions of his work. Texts of Schubert's vocal music can be published without the music, for instance his Lieder (songs) at the LiederNet Archive website.

== Works listed in the Deutsch catalogue ==
The 1951 first edition of the Deutsch catalogue attempted to list all dated works by Schubert in chronological order, assigning them a number from 1 to 965. Undated works were ordered in the range 966–992. Nos. 993–998 referred to manuscripts that had resurfaced shortly before the catalogue was printed.

Later versions of the catalogue adhered to the general principles that Deutsch numbers below 966 referred, in a chronological order, to compositions by Schubert with an established time of composition, and that the range 966–992 was reserved for his compositions with an uncertain date of composition. Thus "Die Taubenpost", the last Lied Schubert composed, was reassigned from D 957 No. 14 to D 965A, and D 993, an early piano composition, to D 2E.

Spurious and doubtful works (Anh. I)
Annex I of the first edition of the catalogue contains only a single composition under the header Spurious and doubtful works, but however also points to some compositions with authentication issues elsewhere in the catalogue. The 1978 edition of the catalogue lists 32 spurious and doubtful works in its first Anhang (annex), including some that were for that reason removed from the main catalogue.

Arrangements by Schubert (Anh. II)
The 1978 version of the catalogue lists 4 arrangements by Schubert in its second Anhang

Works of others composers copied by Schubert (Anh. III)
Annex II in the first edition of the catalogue contains compositions by other composers copied by Schubert. In the 1978 edition the list was expanded and became Anhang III.

"Setting" vs. "version" distinction
the New Schubert Edition distinguishes between Bearbeitung (setting) and Fassung (version), the first meaning an independent composition, the second stages of the same composition (modifications of essentially the same composition). Usually different settings have different D numbers, while versions are grouped under the same D number, unless when set for a different (group of) performer(s). The first edition of the Deutsch catalogue was less strict on that point, leading to Deutsch number reassignments in later publications. Example: D 174 is described as two settings of the same text in the original catalogue, the second having become "D deest" by the time it was published in Series IV, Volume 8 of the New Schubert Edition (while the music has no resemblance to the earlier setting). On the other hand, despite a difference in key and number of movements, the original D 567 and D 568 were ultimately published under the same D number as two versions of the same sonata.

=== Legend ===
Legend to the table
column		content
1	D '51	Deutsch number in the first version of the Deutsch catalogue (1951)
2	D utd	most recent (utd = up to date) Deutsch catalogue number; the basic collation of the list is according to these numbers – whether or not the possibility to adjust the sorting according to the content of other columns is available depends on the device with which the table is displayed.
3	Op. pbl	Opus number (Op.; p indicates Post. = posthumous) and date of first publication (pbl; between brackets; when there is more than one date the earlier dates indicate partial publications). The column sorts to Opus number, then (earliest of) the publication date(s)
4	AGA	Alte Gesamt-Ausgabe = Franz Schubert's Werke: Kritisch durchgesehene Gesammtausgabe. Indicates genre/instrumentation: Series I: Symphonien (Nos. 1-8) (Johannes Brahms, 1884); Series II: Overtüren und Andere Orchesterwerke (Johann Nepomuk Fuchs, 1886); Series III: Oktette (Nos. 1-3) and IV: Streichquintett (Eusebius Mandyczewski, 1889); Series V: Streichquartette (Nos. 1-15) (Joseph Hellmesberger and Eusebius Mandyczewski, 1890); Series VI: Trio für Streichinstrumente (Eusebius Mandyczewski, 1892); Series VII: Trios, Quartets and Quintets with Piano and VIII: Pianoforte und Ein Instrument (Ignaz Brüll, 1886); Series IX: Pianoforte zu vier Händen (Anton Door, 1888); Series X: Sonaten für Pianoforte (Julius Epstein, 1888); Series XI: Fantasie, Impromptus und andere Stücke für Pianoforte (Julius Epstein, 1888); Series XII: Tänze für Pianoforte (Nos. 1-31) (Julius Epstein, 1889); Series XIII: Messen (Nos. 1-7) (Eusebius Mandyczewski, 1887); Series XIV: Kleinere Kirchenmusikwerke (Nos. 1-22) (Eusebius Mandyczewski, 1888); Series XV: Dramatische Musik (Johann Nepomuk Fuchs, 1893); Series XVI: Werke für Männerchor (Nos. 1-46) (Eusebius Mandyczewski, 1891); Series XVII: Werke für gemischten Chor (Nos. 1-19) (Josef Gänsbacher, Eusebius Mandyczewski, 1892); Series XVIII: Werke für Drei und mehr Frauenstimmen mit Pianoforte-Begleitung (Nos. 1-6) (Josef Gänsbacher, Eusebius Mandyczewski, 1891); Series XIX: Kleine Gesangswerke (Nos. 1-36) (Josef Gänsbacher and Eusebius Mandyczewski, 1892); Series XX: Sämtliche einstimmige Lieder und Gesänge (Eusebius Mandyczewski, 1894-1895); Series XXI: Supplement (Eusebius Mandyczewski, 1897); 1. Instrumentalmusik No. 1-5; 2. Instrumentalmusik No. 6-13; 3. Instrumentalmusik No. 14-; 4. Gesangsmusik; Series XXII: Revisionsbericht
5	NSA	NGA/NSA/NSE = New Schubert Edition, also indicates genre/instrumentation: Series I: Church Music; Series II: Stage Works; Series III: Part Songs; Series IV: Lieder; Series V: Orchestral Works; Series VI: Chamber Music; 1. Octet and Nonet; 2. String Quintet; 3. String Quartets I; 4. String Quartets II; 5. String Quartets III; 6. String Trios; 7. Works for Piano and several instruments; 8. Works for Piano and one instrument; 9. Dances for several instruments; Series VII: Piano Music; 1. Works for Piano Four Hands; 2. Works for Piano Two Hands; Series VIII: Supplement, 2. Schubert's Studies
6	Name	unique name, with, if available, a link to the relevant encyclopedia article; sorts by name with initial definite ("Der", "Die", "Das", ...) or indefinite ("Ein", "A", ...) articles, and numbers, moved after the expression they qualify: e.g. "Die Hoffnung, ..." sorts as "Hoffnung, Die, ..." – "Thirty Minuets ..." sorts as "Minuets, 30, ...".
7	Key / incipit	incipit mostly for songs (linking to lyrics and their translation, for instance at The LiederNet Archive, when available), other compositions by key, except for Schubert's stage works: type of composition in brackets.
8	Date	(presumed) date of composition, or, for copies and arrangements, date of Schubert's autograph. Sorts to earliest possible date of completion, unlike the chronology of the Deutsch catalogue that generally collates according to earliest date associated with the composition: e.g. Schubert started the composition of his 3rd String Quartet on 19 November 1812 and completed it on 21 February 1813 – in the Deutsch catalogue the composition is grouped with other compositions from 1812: when using the sort function of the 8th column the composition is grouped with compositions completed in 1813
9	Additional info	may include: Information about the text (lyrics, libretto) of vocal compositions: e.g., "Text by [text author]", "Text: [standard lyrics]", "... from [literary work]"; "other settings: D ..." indicates Schubert's other settings of the same text; for fields starting with "Text ..." this column sorts by text author (last name, first name—or pen name when such name is more established), then incipit of the lyrics (alternatively, when the incipit is rarely used, title of the work); Information about the authenticity of the composition: the work is without doubt Schubert's unless when marked as "Doubtful", "Spurious?" or "Spurious" (in the last case columns 3–8 give no further information about the composition); Forces needed for performance ("For ..."): may be omitted when the type of composition makes the instrumentation clear (e.g. String Quartet → two violins, viola and cello), and, for vocal music, when the setting is for voice and piano; "s", "a", "t" and "b" refer to a single soprano, alto, tenor and bass singer respectively, while "S", "A", "T" and "B" to choral parts for the same types of singers (see SATB).; Specifications regarding movements (e.g. "Allegro – Minuet – Rondo") or sections (e.g. "No. 1 ..."); Information about the completeness of the extant work: the work is considered complete as extant unless when marked "Sketch", "Incomplete", "Unfinished", "Fragment" or "Lost"; Information about versions (e.g. "Two versions: ...")

=== Table ===
Compositions by Franz Schubert listed in the Deutsch catalogue
D '51	D utd	Op. pbl	AGA	NSA	Name	Key / incipit	Date	Additional info
1–1C							1810	Up ↑
1	1	(1888)	IX, 3 No. 30	VII/1, 1 No. 1 & Anh. No. 1	Fantasy, D 1	G major	8/4/1810– 1/5/1810	For piano duet; Two versions of Finale
	1A	(1969)		IV, 6 Anh. No. 1	Song, D 1A	C minor	before 1810?	For b and piano; Sketch; Music partly reused in D 39
	1B			VII/1, 1 Anh. No. 2	Fantasy, D 1B	G major	1810–1811	For piano duet; Fragment; Music related to D 1 and 7
	1C			VII/1, 1 Anh. No. 3	Sonata, D 1C	F major	1810–1811	For piano duet; Largo (fragment)
2–12							1811	Up ↑
996	2A			V, 6 No. 1	Overture, D 2A	D major	1811?	For orchestra
997	2B			V, 6 No. 2	Symphony, D 2B	D major	1811?	Adagio, Allegro con moto (fragment)
998	2C	(1978)		VI, 3 Anh. No. 1	String Quartet, D 2C	D minor or F major	1811?	Fragment
995	2D	(1956) (1970)		VI, 9	Six Minuets, D 2D	Various keys	1811	For winds; Nos. 1–2: piano version publ. in 1956; Nos. 4-6: sketches
993	2E			VII/2, 4	Fantasy, D 2E	C minor	1811	For piano
	2F			VI, 9	Trio, D 2F		1811	For winds?; Sketch; Belongs to a lost Minuet
	2G			V, 6 No. 3	Overture, D 2G	D major	1810–1811?	For orchestra; Fragment
3	3	(1978)		VI, 3 Anh. No. 2	String Quartet, D 3	C major	1812?	Andante (fragment); Partly reused in D 29 and in an early sketch of D 36
4	4	(1886)	II; No. 1	V, 5	Overture to the play Der Teufel als Hydraulicus	(Overture to a comedy with singing); D major	1812?	For orchestra; Play by Albrecht (plot similar to Weidmann's Der Bettelstudent)
5	5	(1894)	XX, 1 No. 1	IV, 6 No. 1	Hagars Klage	Hier am Hügel heißen Sandes	30/03/1811	Text by Schücking; Music partly reused in D 8 and 9
6	6	(1894)	XX, 1 No. 2	IV, 3	Des Mädchens Klage, D 6	Der Eichwald brauset	1811–1812	Text by Schiller, from Wallenstein: Die Piccolomini III, 7 (other settings: D 191 and 389)
7	7	(1894)	XX, 1 No. 3	IV, 6 No. 2	Leichenfantasie	Mit erstorbnem Scheinen	1811?	Text by Schiller; reuses music of D 1B
8	8	(1970)		VI, 2 No. 1	Overture, D 8	C minor	29/6/1811	For string quintet (two violins, two violas and cello); Music reappears in D 8A
	8A	(1970)		VI, 3 No. 3	Overture, D 8A	C minor	After; 12/7/1811	For string quartet; Based on D 8
9	9	(1888)	IX, 3 No. 31	VII/1, 1 No. 2	Fantasy, D 9	G minor	20/9/1811	For piano duet
10	10	(1894)	XX, 1 No. 4	IV, 6 No. 3	Der Vatermörder	Ein Vater starb von des Sohnes Hand	26/12/1811	Text by Pfeffel
11; 966	11	(1893) (1897)	XV, 7 No. 12; XXI, 1 No.1	II, 11	Der Spiegelritter	(Singspiel in three acts)	December; 1811?	Text by Kotzebue; For ssssstttbbbbSATB and orchestra; Overture (publ. in 1897) – Nos. 1–8 (Act I, Nos. 2–3 and 8 are fragments, No. 3 not in AGA, part of No. 3 was D 966)
12	12	(1897)	XXI, 1 No. 2	V, 5	Overture, D 12	D major	1811–1812	For orchestra; Music partly reused in D 94
13–37							1812	Up ↑
13	13			VII/2, 4	Fugue, D 13	D minor	c. 1812	For piano?; By Schubert?
14	14				Overture, D 14		c. 1812	Piano sketch; Lost
15	15	(1895)	XX, 10; No. 590/1	IV, 7 Anh. No. 5	Der Geistertanz, D 15	Die bretterne Kammer der Toten erbebt	c. 1812	Text by Matthisson (other settings: D 15A, 116 and 494); Fragment
15	15A	(1895)	XX, 10; No. 590/2	IV, 7 Anh. No. 6	Der Geistertanz, D 15A	Die bretterne Kammer der Toten erbebt	c. 1812	Text by Matthisson (other settings: D 15, 116 and 494); Fragment
16	16	(1940)		VIII, 2 No. 11	Counterpoint exercises, D 16	G minor (Nos. 1–4); A minor (Nos. 5–7)	1823?	Seven exercises in double counterpoint
17	17	(1940)		VIII, 2 No. 37	Composition exercises, D 17	Quell' innocente figlio	1812?	Text by Metastasio, from Isacco I, "Aria dell' Angelo"; Nine settings with corrections by Salieri; No. 1, for s, related to D 30; No. 2 for ss; Nos. 3 and 5–6 for sat; Nos. 4 and 7–8 for satb (No. 7 not in 1940 publ.)
18	18	(1890)	V No. 1	VI, 3 No. 1	String Quartet No. 1	G minor / B major	1810–1811	Andante, Presto vivace – Minuet – Andante – Presto
19	19				String Quartet, D 19		1810–1811	Lost
19A	19A				String Quartet, D 19A		1810–1811	Lost
	19B				Waltzes and a March, D 19B		1812–1813?	For piano; Lost
20	20				Overture, D 20	B♭ major	1812	For string quartet; Lost
21	21				Six Variations, D 21	E♭ major	1812	For piano; Lost
22	22				Twelve Minuets with Trios, D 22		1812	For piano; Lost
23	23	131p,3 (1830)	XX, 1 No. 6	IV, 6 No. 4	Klaglied	Meine Ruh ist dahin, meine Freud ist entflohn	1812	Text by Rochlitz
24	24				Seven Variations, D 24	F major	1812?	For piano; Fragment; Lost
	24A			VII/2, 4	Fugue, D 24A	C major	summer 1812?	For keyboard (organ or piano); Partly reused in D 24E
	24B			VII/2, 4	Fugue, D 24B	G major	summer 1812?	For keyboard (organ or piano); Two versions
	24C			VII/2, 4	Fugue, D 24C	D minor	summer 1812?	For keyboard (organ or piano)
	24D			VII/2, 4 Anh.	Fugue, D 24D	C major	summer 1812?	For piano; Fragment; Partly reused in D 46
	24E			I, 5 Anh.	Mass, D 24E	F major? Gloria – Credo	summer 1812?	Text: Mass ordinary (other settings: D 31, 45, 49, 56, 66, 105, 167, 324, 452, 678, 755 and 950); For SATB and orchestra; Fragment of a Gloria and a Credo; Partly based on D 24A
25	25			VIII, 2	Counterpoint exercises, D 25		started 18/6/1812	Four 2-part and three 3-part counterpoint exercises; Four 2-part imitation exercises
	25A			VIII, 2	Counterpoint exercises, D 25A		summer 1812?	Two 4-part counterpoint exercises
	25B			VIII, 2	Counterpoint exercises, D 25B		summer 1812?	Fifteen 3-part counterpoint exercises
	25C			VIII, 2	Fugue, D 25C	F major	summer 1812?	Counterpoint exercise for two voices; Fragment
26	26	(1886)	II No. 2	V, 5	Overture, D 26	D major	26/6/1812	For orchestra
27	27	(1928)		I, 8	Salve Regina, D 27	F major Salve Regina	28/06/1812	Text: Salve Regina (other settings: D 106, 223, 386, 676 and 811); For s and orchestra
28	28	(1923)		VI, 7 No. 1	Piano Trio, D 28, a.k.a. Sonata	B♭ major	27/7/1812– 28/8/1812	Allegro
29	29	(1888)	XI No. 9	VII/2, 4	Andante, D 29	C major	9/9/1812	For piano; Related to D 3 and 36
30	30	(1894)	XX, 1 No. 5	IV, 4	Der Jüngling am Bache, D 30	An der Quelle saß der Knabe	24/9/1812	Text by Schiller (other settings: D 192 and 638)
31	31	(1888)	XIV No. 14	I, 5	Kyrie, D 31	D minor Kyrie	25/9/1812	Text: Mass ordinary (other settings: D 24E, 45, 49, 56, 66, 105, 167, 324, 452, 678, 755 and 950); For stSATB and orchestra; First part of a Mass
32	32	(1890) (1897) (1954)	V No. 2 XXII v5	VI, 3 No. 4	String Quartet No. 2	C major	Sep.–Oct. 1812	Presto (publ. in 1890) – Andante – Minuet (publ. in 1890, music partly reappears in D 128 No. 12) – Allegro con spirito (publ. partly in 1897)
33	33	(1940)		VIII, 2 No. 38	Composition exercises, D 33	Entra l'uomo allor che nasce	Sep.–Oct. 1812	Text by Metastasio, from Isacco II, "Aria di Abramo"; Six settings (No. 1 for s, Nos. 2 for sa, No. 3 for sat, Nos. 4–6 for satb) and an Allegretto (b?), with corrections by Salieri
34	34	(1940)		VIII, 2 No. 39	Composition exercises, D 34	Te solo adoro	5/11/1812	Text by Metastasio, from Betulia liberata II, "Aria di Achior"; For satb; Two versions of start; With corrections by Salieri
35	35	(1940)		VIII, 2 No. 40	Composition exercises, D 35	Serbate, o Dei custodi	Oct.–Dec. 1812	Text by Metastasio, from La clemenza di Tito I, 5; Three settings (No. 1 for satb, No. 2 for SATB, No. 3 for t and accompaniment); With corrections by Salieri
36	36	(1890)	V No. 3	VI, 3 No. 5	String Quartet No. 3	B♭ major	19/11/1812– 21/2/1813	Allegro – Andante – Minuet – Allegretto
37	37	74 (1827)	XIX; No. 1	III, 3 No. 1	Die Advokaten	Mein Herr, ich komm' mich anzufragen	25/12/1812– 27/12/1812	Text by Rustenfeld; For ttb and piano
37A–91							1813	Up ↑
967	37A			VII/2, 4 Anh. VIII, 2 No. 13	Fugue sketches, D 37A		1813?	For piano
38	38	(1892)	XIX; No. 20	III, 4 No. 1	Totengräberlied, D 38	Grabe, Spaden, grabe!	1813?	Text by Hölty (other setting: D 44); For ttb
39	39	(1969)		IV, 6 Anh No. 2	Lebenstraum	Ich saß an einer Tempelhalle	early 1810?	Text by Baumberg; Sketch; Music related to D 1A
	39A			VI, 9	Three Minuets with Trios, D 39A		1813	For orchestra; Lost
41	41	(1889)	XII; No. 30	VII/2, 6	Thirty Minuets with Trios, D 41	Various keys	1813	For piano; Nos. 1–8, 11–18 and 20–23 are extant
	41A			VII/2, 4 Anh.	Fugue, D 41A	E minor	1813	For piano; Fragment
42	42	(1895) (1969)	XX, 10; No. 570	IV, 6 No. 5 Anh. No. 3	Aria di Timante	Misero pargoletto	1813?	Text by Metastasio, from Demofoonte III, 5; For s and piano; Two settings: 1st, not in AGA, consisting of two variant fragments
43	43	(1897)	XXI, 4 No. 43	III, 4 No. 2 VIII, 2 No. 34	Sprüche des Confucius, D 43	Dreifach ist der Schritt der Zeit	8/7/1813	Text by Schiller (other settings: D 69 and 70); For ttb
44	44	(1894)	XX, 1 No. 7	IV, 6 No. 6	Totengräberlied, D 44	Grabe, Spaden, grabe!	19/1/1813	Text by Hölty (other setting: D 38)
45	45	(1888)	XIV No. 21	I, 5	Kyrie, D 45	B♭ major Kyrie	1/3/1813	Text: Mass ordinary (other settings: D 24E, 31, 49, 56, 66, 105, 167, 324, 452, 678, 755 and 950); For SATB
46	46	(1890)	V No. 4	VI, 3 No. 6	String Quartet No. 4	C major	3/3/1813– 7/3/1813	Adagio – Andante con moto – Minuet – Finale
47	47	(1974)		III, 2b Anh. No. 1	Dithyrambe, D 47	Nimmer, das glaubt mir, erscheinen die Götter	29/3/1813	Text by Schiller (other setting: D 801); For tbSATB and piano; Fragment
48	48	(1871) (1888)	IX, 3 No. 32	VII/1, 1 No. 3	Fantasy, D 48, a.k.a. Grand Sonata	C minor	April 1813– 10/6/1813	For piano duet; AGA includes concluding fugue
49	49	(1888)	XIV No. 15	I, 5	Kyrie, D 49	D minor Kyrie	early April; 1813– 15/4/1813	Text: Mass ordinary (other settings: D 24E, 31, 45, 56, 66, 105, 167, 324, 452, 678, 755 and 950); For satbSATB and orchestra; First part of a Mass
50	50	(1894)	XX, 1 No. 8	IV, 6 No. 7	Die Schatten	Freunde, deren Grüfte sich schon bemoosten!	12/4/1813	Text by Matthisson
51	51	(1897)	XXI, 4 No. 37	III, 4 No. 3	Unendliche Freude, D 51	Unendliche Freude durchwallet das Herz	15/4/1813	Text by Schiller, stanza 3 from "Elysium" (other stanzas and settings: D 53, 54, 57, 58, 60 and 584); For ttb
52	52	(1868)	XX, 1 No. 9	IV, 2b No. 8	Sehnsucht, D 52	Ach, aus dieses Tales Gründen	15/4/1813– 17/4/1813	Text by Schiller (other setting: D 636); For b and piano
53	53	(1892)	XIX; No. 9	III, 4 No. 4	Vorüber die stöhnende Klage	Vorüber die stöhnende Klage!	18/4/1813	Text by Schiller, stanza 1 from "Elysium" (other stanzas and settings: D 51, 54, 57, 58, 60 and 584); For ttb
54	54	(1873)	XIX; No. 22	III, 4 No. 5 VIII, 2 No. 17	Unendliche Freude, D 54	Unendliche Freude durchwallet das Herz	19/4/1813	Text by Schiller, stanza 3 from "Elysium" (other stanzas and settings: D 51, 53, 57, 58, 60 and 584); Canon for three male voices
55	55	(1892)	XIX; No. 12	III, 4 No. 6	Selig durch die Liebe	Selig durch die Liebe Götter	21/4/1813	Text by Schiller, from "Der Triumph der Liebe": stanza 1; Other: D 61, 62, 63, 64, 983A; For ttb
56	56	(1892)	XIX; No. 29	I, 5 VIII, 2 No. 18	Sanctus, D 56	B♭ major Sanctus	21/4/1813	Text: Mass ordinary (other settings: D 24E, 31, 45, 49, 66, 105, 167, 324, 452, 678, 755 and 950); Canon for three voices; Two versions
57	57	(1897)	XXI, 4 No. 38	III, 4 No. 7	Hier strecket der wallende Pilger	Hier strecket der wallende Pilger	29/4/1813	Text by Schiller, stanza 4 from "Elysium" (other stanzas and settings: D 51, 53, 54, 58, 60 and 584); For ttb
58	58	(1892)	XIX; No. 10	III, 4 No. 8	Dessen Fahne Donnerstürme wallte	Dessen Fahne Donnerstürme wallte	May 1813	Text by Schiller, stanza 5 from "Elysium" (other stanzas and settings: D 51, 53, 54, 57, 60 and 584); For ttb
59	59	(1832)	XX, 1 No. 10	IV, 6 No. 8	Verklärung	Lebensfunke, vom Himmel entglüht	4/5/1813	Text by Herder after Pope's "The dying Christian to his soul"
60	60	(1892)	XIX; No. 11	III, 4 No. 16	Hier umarmen sich getreue Gatten	Hier umarmen sich getreue Gatten	3/10/1813	Text by Schiller, stanza 6 from "Elysium" (other stanzas and settings: D 51, 53, 54, 57, 58 and 584); For ttb
61	61	(1897)	XXI, 4 No. 39	III, 4 No. 9 VIII, 2 No. 19	Ein jugendlicher Maienschwung	Ein jugendlicher Maienschwung	8/5/1813	Text by Schiller, from "Der Triumph der Liebe": stanza 9; Other: D 55, 62, 63, 64, 983A; Canon for three voices
62	62	(1897)	XXI, 4 No. 40	III, 4 No. 10; VIII, 2 No. 35	Thronend auf erhabnem Sitz	Thronend auf erhabnem Sitz	9/5/1813	Text by Schiller, from "Der Triumph der Liebe": stanza 15; Other: D 55, 61, 63, 64, 983A
63	63	(1892)	XIX; No. 13	III, 4 No. 11	Wer die steile Sternenbahn	Wer die steile Sternenbahn	10/5/1813	Text by Schiller, from "Der Triumph der Liebe": stanza 26; Other: D 55, 61, 62, 64, 983A; For ttb
64	64	(1897)	XXI, 4 No. 41	III, 4 No. 12; VIII, 2 No. 36	Majestät'sche Sonnenroße	Majestät'sche Sonnenroße	10/5/1813	Text by Schiller, from "Der Triumph der Liebe": stanza 16; Other: D 55, 61, 62, 63, 983A; For ttb
65	65	(1892)	XIX; Anh. I, No. 35	III, 4 Anh. II No. 1 VIII, 2 No. 20	Schmerz verzerret ihr Gesicht	Schmerz verzerret ihr Gesicht	11/5/1813	Text by Schiller, from "Gruppe aus dem Tartarus": stanza 2 (other settings: D 396 and 583); For ttb; Sketch
66	66	(1888)	XIV No. 16	I, 5	Kyrie, D 66	F major Kyrie	12/5/1813	Text: Mass ordinary (other settings: D 24E, 31, 45, 49, 56, 105, 167, 324, 452, 678, 755 and 950); For SATB and orchestra
67	67	(1897)	XXI, 4 No. 42	III, 4 No. 13	Frisch atmet des Morgens lebendiger Hauch	Frisch atmet des Morgens lebendiger Hauch	15/5/1813	Text by Schiller (other setting: D 402); For ttb
68	68	(1890)	V No. 5	VI, 3 No. 7	String Quartet No. 5	B♭ major	8/6/1813– 18/8/1813	Allegro maestoso – Allegro; Middle movements missing
69	69	(1892)	XIX; No. 23	III, 4 No. 14; VIII, 2 No. 21	Sprüche des Confucius, D 69	Dreifach ist der Schritt der Zeit	8/7/1813	Text by Schiller (other settings: D 43 and 70); Canon for three voices
70	70	(1974)		III, 4 Anh. I No. 1 VIII, 2 No. 33	Sprüche des Confucius, D 70	Dreifach ist der Schritt der Zeit	8/7/1813	Text by Schiller (other settings: D 43 and 69); For ttb; Fragment
71	71	(1892)	XIX; No. 14	III, 4 No. 15	Die zwei Tugendwege	Zwei sind der Wege	15/7/1813	Text by Schiller; For ttb
	71A	(1956)		I, 8 VIII, 2 No. 22	Alleluja, D 71A	F major	July 1813?	Canon for three voices
	71B			VII/2, 4 Anh. VIII, 2 No. 14	Fugue, D 71B	E minor	July 1813	For piano; Fragment
966A	71C			V, 6 No. 5	Orchestral piece, D 71C	D major	Aug. or Sep. 1813	Fragment; First pages, a.k.a. D 74A, based on D 74
72	72	(1889) (1890)	III No. 2 XXII v1	VI, 1 No. 1 & Anh.	Wind Octet	F major	completed 18/8/1813	Allegro (fragment, publ. in 1890) – Minuet – Allegro; Slow middle movement lost?
73	73	(1868)	XX, 1 No. 11	IV, 4	Thekla: Eine Geisterstimme, D 73	Wo ich sei, und wo mich hingewendet	22/8/1813– 23/8/1813	Text by Schiller (other setting: D 595)
74	74	(1890)	V No. 6	VI, 4 No. 8	String Quartet No. 6	D major	22/8/1813– Sep. 1813	Allegro ma non troppo – Andante – Minuet – Allegro
966A	74A			V, 6 No. 4	Orchestral piece, D 74A	D major	Aug. or Sep. 1813	Fragment; Variant D number for first pages of D 71C
75	75	(1850)	XVI; No. 16	III, 3 No. 18	Trinklied, D 75	Freunde, sammelt euch im Kreise	29/08/1813	Text by Schäffer; For bTTB and piano
76	76	(1871) (1969)	XX, 10; No. 571	IV, 6 No. 9 Anh. No. 4	Aria di Fronimo	Pensa, che questo istante	7 and 13; Sep. 1813	Text by Metastasio, from Alcide al bivio, 1; For b and piano; Two versions (2nd in AGA)
77; 111	77	(1831) (1894)	XX, 1 No. 12	IV, 6 No. 10	Der Taucher	Wer wagt es, Rittersmann oder Knapp	17/9/1813– early 1815	Text by Schiller; Two versions: 2nd, publ. in 1894, was D 111
78	78	(1895)	XX, 10; No. 572	IV, 6 No. 11	Aria di Venere	Son fra l'onde	18/9/1813	Text by Metastasio, from Gli orti esperdi, I; For s and piano
79	79	(1889)	III No. 3	VI, 1 No. 2	Wind Nonet, a.k.a. Eine kleine Trauermusik or Franz Schuberts Begräbniß-Feyer	E♭ minor	19/9/1813	Grave con espressione
80	80	(1892)	XIX; No. 4	III, 3 No. 2 Anh. III No. 1 Anh. IV No. 1	Zur Namensfeier meines Vaters	Ertöne Leier zur Festesfeier!	27/9/1813	Text by Schubert; For ttb and guitar
81	81	(1895)	XX, 10; No. 583	IV, 14	Auf den Sieg der Deutschen	Verschwunden sind die Schmerzen	fall 1813	Text by Schubert? (other setting: D 88); For voice, two violins and cello
82	82	(1884)	I, 1 No. 1	V, 1 No. 1	Symphony No. 1	D major	completed 28/10/1813	Adagio, Allegro vivace – Andante – Minuet – Allegro vivace
83	83	(1895)	XX, 10; No. 582	IV, 14	Zur Namensfeier des Herrn Andreas Siller	Des Phöbus Strahlen	28/10/1813– 4/11/1813	For voice, violin and harp
84	84	(1888)	XV, 1 No. 1	II, 1	Des Teufels Lustschloß	(Singspiel in three acts)	30/10/1813– 22/10/1814	Text by Kotzebue; Music for sssttbbbSSSATTBB and orchestra; Two versions: Overture (2nd version in AGA) – Act I (Nos. 1–11, 2nd version in AGA) – Act II (Nos. 12–17, 1st version only, in AGA) – Act III (Nos. 18–23, 1st version Nos. 21 and 23 only, 2nd version in AGA); Sketch of an orchestral piece (from 1st version of Act III?): compare D 94A
86	86	(1886)	II; No. 10	VI, 4 Anh. No. 1 VI, 9	Minuet, D 86	D major	November; 1813?	For string quartet
87	87	125p,1 (1840)	V No. 10	VI, 4 No. 9	String Quartet No. 10	E♭ major	November; 1813	Allegro più moderato – Scherzo – Adagio – Allegro
	87A			VI, 4 Anh. No. 2	Andante, D 87A	C major	November; 1813	For four voices (string quartet or vocal ensemble?); Fragment
88	88	(1892)	XIX; No. 21	III, 4 No. 17; VIII, 2 No. 23	Verschwunden sind die Schmerzen	Verschwunden sind die Schmerzen	15/11/1813	Text by Schubert? (other setting: D 88); Canon for ttb
89; 90	89	(1886)	II No. 8 and No. 9	VI, 9	Five Minuets and Five German Dances	Various keys	19/11/1813	For string quartet; Minuets have six Trios, German Dances have seven Trios and a Coda
91	91	(1956)		VII/2, 6	Two Minuets, D 91	Various keys	22/11/1813	For piano; Each minuet with two Trios
92–126							1814	Up ↑
93	93	(1894)	XX, 1 Nos. 13–15	IV, 7 Anh. No. 1	Don Gayseros	1. Don Gayseros,... wunderlicher, schöner Ritter – 2. Nächtens klang die süße Laute – 3. An dem jungen Morgenhimmel	1815?	Text by Motte Fouqué, from Der Zauberring; Nos. 2 and 3 incomplete
94	94	(1871)	V No. 7	VI, 3 No. 2	String Quartet No. 7	D major	1811 or 1812?	Allegro (partly reused in D 12) – Andante con moto – Minuet – Presto
	94A			II, 1 V, 6 No. 6	Orchestral piece, D 94A	B♭ major	c. 1814	Fragment; For 1st version of D 84, Act III?
	94B			VI, 9	Five Minuets and Six German Dances, D 94B		1814	For string quartet and two horns; Lost
95	95	(1848)	XX, 1 No. 25	IV, 7 No. 1	Adelaide	Einsam wandelt dein Freund	1814	Text by Matthisson
97	97	(1894)	XX, 1 No. 19	IV, 7 No. 2	Trost: An Elisa	Lehnst du deine bleichgehärmte Wange	1814	Text by Matthisson
98	98	(1894) (1968)	XX, 1 No. 24	IV, 7 No. 3 Anh. No. 2	Erinnerungen, D 98	Am Seegestad, in lauen Vollmondsnächten	fall 1814	Text by Matthisson (other setting: D 424); Two versions: 1st is fragment, 2nd in AGA
99	99	(1894)	XX, 1 No. 16	IV, 7 No. 4	Andenken, D 99	Ich denke dein wenn durch den Hain	April 1814	Text by Matthisson (other setting: D 423)
100	100	(1894)	XX, 1 No. 17	IV, 7 No. 5	Geisternähe	Der Dämm’rung Schein durchblinkt den Hain	April 1814	Text by Matthisson
101	101	(1894)	XX, 1 No. 18	IV, 7 No. 6	Erinnerung, D 101, a.k.a. Todtenopfer	Kein Rosenschimmer leuchtet	April 1814	Text by Matthisson
102	102	(1840)	XX, 1 No. 20	IV, 7 No. 7	Die Betende	Laura betet!	fall 1814	Text by Matthisson; Partly reused in D 918
103	103	(1939)		VI, 4 Anh. No. 3	Quartettsatz, D 103	C minor	23/4/1814	Grave, Allegro (fragment); Completed by Alfred Orel in 1st ed.
104	104	(1895)	XX, 10; No. 584	IV, 7 No. 8 & Anh. No. 3	Die Befreier Europas in Paris	Sie sind in Paris!	16/5/1814	Text by Mikan; Two drafts and a final version
105; 185	105	(1856)	XIII, 1 No. 1	I, 1a	Mass No. 1	F major Kyrie – Gloria – Credo – Sanctus & Benedictus – Agnus Dei	17/5/1814– 22/7/1814	Text: Mass ordinary (other settings: D 24E, 31, 45, 49, 56, 66, 167, 324, 452, 678, 755 and 950); For ssattbSATB and orchestra; 2nd setting of Dona nobis pacem was D 185; Partly reused in D 484
106	106	(1888)	XIV No. 9	I, 8	Salve Regina, D 106	B♭ major Salve Regina	28/6/1814– 1/7/1814	Text: Salve Regina (other settings: D 27, 223, 386, 676 and 811); For t and orchestra
107	107	(1894) (1968)	XX, 1 No. 21	IV, 7 No. 9	Lied aus der Ferne	Wenn in des Abends letztem Scheine	July 1814	Text by Matthisson; Two versions: 1st in AGA
108	108	(1894)	XX, 1 No. 22	IV, 7 No. 10	Der Abend, D 108	Purpur malt die Tannenhügel	July 1814	Text by Matthisson
109	109	(1894)	XX, 1 No. 23	IV, 7 No. 11	Lied der Liebe	Durch Fichten am Hügel	July 1814	Text by Matthisson
110	110	(1891)	XVI; No. 43	III, 1	Wer ist groß?	Wer ist wohl groß?	24/7/1814– 25/7/1814	For bTTBB and orchestra
111	77							See D 77
	111A			VI, 6 Anh. No. 1	String Trio, D 111A	B♭ major	5/9/1814– 13/9/1814	Allegro (fragment); early version of D 112
112	112	168p (1863)	V No. 8	VI, 4 No. 10	String Quartet No. 8	B♭ major	5/9/1814– 13/9/1814	Allegro ma non troppo – Andante sostenuto – Minuet – Presto; Based on D 111A
113	113	58,2 (1821) (1826) (1894)	XX, 1 No. 26	IV, 3	An Emma	Weit in nebelgrauer Ferne	17/9/1814	Text by Schiller; Three versions: 2nd publ. in 1821 – 3rd is Op. 58 No. 2
114	114	(1868) (1901)	XX, 1 No. 27	IV, 7 No. 12 & Anh. No. 4	Romanze, D 114	Ein Fräulein klagt' im finstern Turm	September; 1814	Text by Matthisson; Two versions: 2nd in AGA
115	115	(1840)	XX, 1 No. 28	IV, 7 No. 13	An Laura, als sie Klopstocks Auferstehungslied sang	Herzen, die gen Himmel sich erheben	2/10/1814– 7/10/1814	Text by Matthisson
116	116	(1840)	XX, 1 No. 29	IV, 7 No. 14	Der Geistertanz, D 116	Die bretterne Kammer der Toten erbebt	14/10/1814	Text by Matthisson (other settings: D 15, 15A and 494)
117	117	(1894)	XX, 1 No. 30	IV, 8 No. 45	Das Mädchen aus der Fremde, D 117	In einem Tal bei armen Hirten	16/10/1814	Text by Schiller (other setting: D 252)
118	118	2 (1821)	XX, 1 No. 31	IV, 1a	Gretchen am Spinnrade	Meine Ruh' ist hin	19/10/1814	Text by Goethe, from Faust I, 15
119	119	(1850)	XX, 1 No. 32	IV, 7 No. 15	Nachtgesang, D 119	O! gib vom weichen Pfühle	30/11/1814	Text by Goethe
120	120	(1835)	XX, 1 No. 33	IV, 7 No. 16	Trost in Tränen	Wie kommt's, daß du so traurig bist	30/11/1814	Text by Goethe
121	121	3,1 (1821) (1894)	XX, 1 No. 34	IV, 1a & b No. 2	Schäfers Klagelied	Da droben auf jenem Berge	30/11/1814– 28/2/1819?	Text by Goethe; Two versions: 1st is Op. 3 No. 1 – 2nd composed for 28/2/1819?
122	122	(1872)	XX, 1 No. 38	IV, 7 No. 17	Ammenlied	Am hohen, hohen Turm	early Dec. 1814	Text by Lubi
123	123	(1842)	XX, 1 No. 35	IV, 7 No. 18	Sehnsucht, D 123	Was zieht mir das Herz so?	3/12/1814	Text by Goethe
124	124	(1885) (1894) (1968)	XX, 1 No. 36	IV, 7 No. 19 & Anh. No. 7	Am See, D 124	Sitz' ich im Gras am glatten See	3/12/1814– 7/12/1814	Text by Mayrhofer; Two versions: 1st is fragment – 2nd, modified in 1885 publ., in AGA
125	125	(1884)	I, 1 No. 2	V, 1 No. 2	Symphony No. 2	B♭ major	10/12/1814– 24/3/1815	Largo, Allegro vivace – Andante – Minuet – Presto vivace
126	126	(1832) (1873)	XX, 1 No. 37	IV, 7 No. 20 & Anh. No. 8	Scene from Faust	Wie anders, Gretchen, war dir's	early Dec.– 12/12/1814	Text by Goethe, from Faust I, 20; Two versions: 2nd, publ. in 1832, in AGA
127–330							1815	Up ↑
128	128	(1897)	XXI, 3 No. 23	VII/2, 6	Twelve Viennese German Dances	Various keys	1812?	For piano; Includes introduction; No. 12 related to D 32
129	129	(1892)	XIX; No. 16	III, 4 No. 18	Mailied, D 129	Grüner wird die Au	1815?	Text by Hölty (other settings: D 199 and 503); For ttb
130	130	(1892)	XIX; No. 25	III, 4 No. 19; VIII, 2 No. 24	Der Schnee Zerrinnt	Der Schnee Zerrinnt	1815?	Text by Hölty (other setting: D 202); Canon for three voices
131	131	(1892)	XIX; No. 28	III, 4 No. 20; VIII, 2 No. 26	Lacrimoso son io	Lacrimoso son io	1815?	Canon for three voices; Two versions: 2nd is "Lacrimosa son io"
134	134	126p (1830)	XX, 2 No. 99	IV, 7 No. 21	Ballade	Ein Fräulein schaut vom hohen Turm	1815?	Text by Kenner
135	135	(1930)		VII/2, 6	German Dance with Trio, D 135	E major	1815	For piano; Variant of D 146 No. 3 (other Trio)
136	136	46 (1825)	XIV No. 1	I, 8	Offertory, D 136, a.k.a. Offertory No. 1	Totus in corde langueo C major	1815?	For s or t, clarinet or violin, and orchestra
137	137	(1893)	XV, 7 No. 14	II, 12	Adrast	(Singspiel)	fall 1819– early 1820	Text by Mayrhofer; For stbTTBB and orchestra; Nos. 1–8 complete (abandoned variants for some numbers, Nos. 1–7 in AGA) and sketches and fragments for six further numbers; Overture: D 648?
138	138	5,1 (1821) (1970)	XX, 3 No. 177	IV, 1a & b No. 6	Rastlose Liebe	Dem Schnee, dem Regen, dem Wind entgegen	19/5/1815– May 1821	Text by Goethe; Two versions: 1st, in AGA, is Op. 5 No. 1
139	139	(1930)		VII/2, 6	German Dance with Trio, D 139	C♯ major (Trio in A major)	1815	For piano
140	140	(1850)	XVIII; No. 6	III, 3 No. 3	Klage um Ali Bey, D 140	Laßt mich! laßt mich! ich will klagen	1815	Text by Claudius (other setting: D 496A); For ttb (and piano?)
141	141	131p,1 (1830)	XX, 2 No. 43	IV, 7 No. 23	Der Mondabend	Rein und freundlich lacht der Himmel	1815	Text by Kumpf
142	142	92,3 (1828) (1885) (1895)	XX, 3 No. 174	IV, 5	Geistes-Gruß	Hoch auf dem alten Turme steht	before Apr. 1816– after Nov. 1821	Text by Goethe; Six versions: 2nd publ. in 1885 – 3rd and 5th not in AGA – 6th is Op. 92 No. 3
143	143	109p,2 (1829)	XX, 3 No. 181	IV, 7 No. 24	Genügsamkeit	Dort raget ein Berg aus den Wolken her	1815	Text by Schober; Intro in 1st ed. not by Schubert
144	144	(1895)	XXII, 11; No. 209	IV, 7 Anh. No. 9	Romanze, D 144	In der Väter Hallen ruhte	April 1816	Text by Stolberg-Stolberg; Fragment
145	145	18 (1823)	XII; No. 2	VII/2, 6 & 7a	12 Waltzes, 17 Ländler and 9 Écossaises, D 145	Various keys	c. 1815– July 1821	For piano; Waltz No. 7 ≈ D 970 No. 2; Écossaises Nos. 5 and 6 identical to D 421 No. 1 and 697 No. 5
146	146	127p (1824) (1830)	XII; No. 8	VII/2, 6 & 7a	20 Waltzes, D 146, a.k.a. Letzte Walzer	Various keys	1815– Feb. 1823	For piano; No. 2 publ. in 1824, all 20 as Op. posth. 127 in 1830
147	147	(1892)	XIX; No. 15	III, 4 No. 21	Bardengesang	Rolle, du strömigter Carun	20/1/1816?	Text by Macpherson (Ossian), from Comala, transl. by E. Baron de Harold
148	148	131p,2 (1830)	XIX; No. 8	III, 3 No. 4	Trinklied, D 148	Brüder! unser Erdenwallen	February; 1815	Text by Castelli; For tTTB and piano
149	149	117p (1829) (1894)	XX, 2 No. 45	IV, 7 No. 25	Der Sänger	Was hör' ich draußen vor dem Tür	February; 1815	Text by Goethe, from Wilhelm Meister's Apprenticeship; Two versions: 2nd is Op. posth. 117, AGA switches 1st and 2nd
150	150	(1830)	XX, 2 No. 44	IV, 7 No. 26	Lodas Gespenst	Der bleiche, kalte Mond erhob sich im Osten	17/1/1816	Text by Macpherson (Ossian), from Carric-thura, transl. by E. Baron de Harold; 1st ed. replaces end by music from D 277
151	151	(1850)	XX, 2 No. 39	IV, 7 No. 27	Auf einen Kirchhof	Sei gegrüßt, geweihte Stille	2/2/1815	Text by Schlechta
152	152	(1894)	XX, 2 No. 40	IV, 7 No. 28	Minona	Wie treiben die Wolken so finster und schwer	8/2/1815	Text by Bertrand
153	153	(1845)	XX, 2 No. 41	IV, 7 No. 29	Als ich sie erröten sah	All mein Wirken, all mein Leben	10/2/1815	Text by Ehrlich
154	154	(1897)	XXI, 2 No. 8	VII/2, 1 Anh. No. 1	Piano Sonata, D 154	E major	11/2/1815	Allegro (fragment); Partly reused in D 157
155	155	165p,3 (1862)	XX, 2 No. 42	IV, 7 No. 30	Das Bild	Ein Mädchen ist's	10/2/1815	
156	156	(1887)	XI No. 6	VII/2, 4 & Anh.	Ten Variations, D 156	F major	completed 15/2/1815	For piano; Variant of Theme and Var. II
157	157	(1888)	X No. 1	VII/2, 1 No. 1	Piano Sonata, D 157	E major	started 18/2/1815	Allegro ma non troppo (partly reuses D 154) – Andante – Minuet
158	158	(1889)	XII; No. 29	VII/2, 6	Écossaise, D 158	D minor – F major	21/2/1815	For piano
159	159	116p (1829) (1968)	XX, 2 No. 46	IV, 7 No. 31	Die Erwartung	Hör' ich das Pförtchen nicht gehen?	May 1816	Text by Schiller; Two versions: 2nd, in AGA, is Op. posth. 116
160	160	(1894)	XX, 2 No. 47	IV, 13	Am Flusse, D 160	Verfließet, vielgeliebte Lieder	27/2/1815	Text by Goethe (other setting: D 766)
161	161	19,2 (1825) (1894)	XX, 2 No. 48	IV, 1a & b No. 14	An Mignon	Über Tal und Fluß getragen	27/2/1815	Text by Goethe; Two versions: 2nd is Op. 19 No. 2
162	162	5,2 (1821) (1894)	XX, 2 No. 49	IV, 1a & Anh. No. 2	Nähe des Geliebten	Ich denke dein, wenn mir der Sonne Schimmer	27/2/1815	Text by Goethe; Two versions: 2nd is Op. 5 No. 2
163	163	(1894)	XX, 2 No. 50	IV, 8 No. 1	Sängers Morgenlied, D 163	Süßes Licht! Aus goldnen Pforten	27/2/1815	Text by Körner (other setting: D 165)
164	164			IV, 8 Anh. No. 1	Liebesrausch, D 164	Glanz des Guten und des Schönen strahlt mir dein hohes Bild	March 1815	Text by Körner (other setting: D 179); Fragment
165	165	(1872)	XX, 2 No. 51	IV, 8 No. 2	Sängers Morgenlied, D 165	Süßes Licht! Aus goldnen Pforten	1/3/1815	Text by Körner (other setting: D 163)
166	166	(1894)	XX, 2 No. 52	IV, 8 No. 3	Amphiaraos	Vor Thebens siebenfach gähnenden Toren	1/3/1815	Text by Körner
167	167	(1846)	XIII, 1 No. 2	I, 1b	Mass No. 2	G major Kyrie – Gloria – Credo – Sanctus & Benedictus – Agnus Dei	2/3/1815– 7/3/1815	Text: Mass ordinary (other settings: D 24E, 31, 45, 49, 56, 66, 105, 324, 452, 678, 755 and 950); For stbSATB and orchestra; Tr and Ti added by Ferd. Schubert; R. Führer as composer in 1st publ.
168	168	(1872)	XVII; No. 16	III, 2a No. 2	Nun laßt uns den Leib begraben, a.k.a. Begräbnislied	Begrabt den Leib in seiner Gruft	9/3/1815	Text by Klopstock; For SATB and piano
987	168A	(1872)	XVII; No. 17	III, 2a No. 3	Jesus Christus unser Heiland, der den Tod überwand, a.k.a. Osterlied	Überwunden hat der Herr den Tod!	9/3/1815	Text by Klopstock; For SATB and piano
169	169	(1894)	XX, 2 No. 53	III, 3 No. 10; Anh. I No. 1	Trinklied vor der Schlacht	Schlacht, du brichst an!	12/3/1815	Text by Körner; For double unison choir and piano
170	170	(1873)	XX, 2 No. 54	III, 3 No. 11	Schwertlied	Du Schwert an meiner Linken	12/3/1815	Text by Körner; For voice, unison choir and piano
171	171	(1831)	XX, 2 No. 55	IV, 8 No. 4	Gebet während der Schlacht	Vater, ich rufe dich!	12/3/1815	Text by Körner
172	172			IV, 8 Anh. No. 3	Der Morgenstern, D 172	Stern der Liebe, Glanzgebilde	12/3/1815	Text by Körner (other setting: D 203); Fragment
173	173	(1871)	V No. 9	VI, 4 No. 11	String Quartet No. 9	G minor	25/3/1815– 1/4/1815	Allegro con brio – Andantino – Minuet – Allegro
174	174	(1845)	XX, 2 No. 56	IV, 8 No. 5	Das war ich, D 174	Jüngst träumte mir	26/3/1815	Text by Körner; D. 174 used to include Das war ich, D deest
174	deest	(1894)	XXII, 11; No. 56	IV, 8 Anh. No. 2	Das war ich, D deest		June 1816	Fragment; Music without text, title identical to D 174
175	175	(1888)	XIV; No. 12	I, 9 No. 1	Stabat Mater, D 175	G minor Stabat Mater dolorosa	4/4/1815– 6/4/1815	For SATB and orchestra
176	176	(1872)	XX, 2 No. 57	IV, 8 No. 6	Die Sterne, D 176	Was funkelt ihr so mild mich an	6/4/1815	Text by Fellinger
177	177	173p,3 (1867)	XX, 2 No. 58	IV, 8 No. 7	Vergebliche Liebe	Ja, ich weiß es, diese treue Liebe	6/4/1815	Text by Bernard
	177A			VIII, 3	Am ersten Mai	Ich ging mit ihr im Freien	before 1821	Text by Bernard; Music lost; Spurious?
178	178	(1897)	XXI, 3 No. 22	VII/2, 4 & Anh.	Adagio in G major, D 178	G major	8/4/1815	For piano; Two versions: 2nd is a fragment
179	179	(1872)	XX, 2 No. 59	IV, 8 No. 8	Liebesrausch, D 179	Dir, Mädchen, schlägt mit leisem Beben	8/4/1815	Text by Körner; (other setting: D 164)
180	180	(1894)	XX, 2 No. 60	IV, 8 No. 9	Sehnsucht der Liebe	Wie die Nacht mit heil'gem Beben	8/4/1815	Text by Körner
181	181	(1888)	XIV No. 4	I, 9 No. 2	Offertory, D 181	Tres sunt, qui testimonium dant in coelo A minor	10/4/1815– 11/4/1815	For SATB and orchestra
182	182	(1842)	XX, 2 No. 61	IV, 8 No. 10	Die erste Liebe	Die erste Liebe füllt das Herz	12/4/1815	Text by Fellinger
183	183	(1887)	XX, 2 No. 62	III, 3 No. 12	Trinklied, D 183	Ihr Freunde und du, gold'ner Wein	12/4/1815	Text by Zettler; For voice, unison choir and piano
184	184	150p (1843)	XIV No. 5	I, 9 No. 3	Gradual, D 184	Benedictus es, Domine; C major	15/4/1815– 17/4/1815	For SATB and orchestra
185	105							See D 105
186	186	(1894)	XX, 2 No. 65	IV, 8 No. 11	Die Sterbende	Heil! dies ist die letze Zähre	May 1815	Text by Matthisson
187	187	(1894)	XX, 2 No. 63	IV, 10	Stimme der Liebe, D 187	Abendgewölke schweben hell	May 1815	Text by Matthisson (other setting: D 418)
188	188	(1887)	XX, 2 No. 64	IV, 8 No. 12	Naturgenuß, D 188	Im Abendschimmer wallt der Quell	May 1815	Text by Matthisson (other setting: D 422)
189	189	111p,1 (1829)	XX, 2 No. 66	III, 3 No. 13	An die Freude	Freude, schöner Götterfunken	May 1815	Text by Schiller; For voice, unison choir and piano
190	190	(1888)	XV, 2 No. 2	II, 2 IV, 14	Der vierjährige Posten	(Singspiel in one act); Includes: 5. Gott! Gott! höre meine Stimme	8/5/1815– 19/5/1815	Text by Körner; Music for stttbSATB and orchestra; Overture – Nos. 1–8 (No. 5 also for voice and piano)
191	191	58,3 (1826) (1894)	XX, 2 No. 67	IV, 3	Des Mädchens Klage, D 191	Der Eichwald brauset	15/5/1815	Text by Schiller, from Wallenstein: Die Piccolomini III, 7 (other settings: D 6 and 389); Two versions: 2nd is Op. 58 No. 3
192	192	(1887)	XX, 2 No. 68	IV, 4	Der Jüngling am Bache, D 192	An der Quelle saß der Knabe	15/5/1815	Text by Schiller (other settings: D 30 and 638)
193	193	57,3 (1826)	XX, 2 No. 69	IV, 3	An den Mond, D 193	Geuß, lieber Mond, geuß deine Silberflimmer	17/5/1815	Text by Hölty; Autograph without piano intro
194	194	(1894)	XX, 2 No. 70	IV, 8 No. 13	Die Mainacht	Wann der silberne Mond	17/5/1815	Text by Hölty
195	195	173p,1 (1867)	XX, 2 No. 71	IV, 8 No. 14	Amalia	Schön wie Engel voll Walhallas Wonne	19/5/1815	Text by Schiller, from Die Räuber III, 1
196	196	172p,3 (1865)	XX, 2 No. 72	IV, 8 No. 15	An die Nachtigall	Geuß nicht so laut der liebentflammten Lieder	22/5/1815	Text by Hölty
197	197	(1850)	XX, 2 No. 73	IV, 8 No. 16	An die Apfelbäume, wo ich Julien erblickte	Ein heilig Säuseln und ein Gesangeston	22/5/1815	Text by Hölty
198	198	(1894)	XX, 2 No. 74	IV, 8 No. 17	Seufzer	Die Nachtigall singt überall	22/5/1815	Text by Hölty
199	199	(1885)	XIX; No. 30	III, 4 No. 22	Mailied, D 199	Grüner wird die Au	24/5/1815	Text by Hölty (other settings: D 129 and 503); For two voices or two horns
200	200	(1884)	I, 1 No. 3	V, 1 No. 3	Symphony No. 3	D major	24/5/1815– 19/6/1815	Adagio maestoso, Allegro con brio – Allegretto – Minuet – Presto vivace
201	201	(1970)		IV, 10	Auf den Tod einer Nachtigall, D 201	Sie ist dahin, die Maienlieder tönte	25/5/1815	Text by Hölty (other setting: D 399); Fragment
202	202	(1885)	XIX; No. 31	III, 4 No. 23	Mailied, D 202	Der Schnee Zerrinnt	26/5/1815	Text by Hölty (other setting: D 130); For two voices or two horns
203	203	(1892)	XIX; No. 32	III, 4 No. 24	Der Morgenstern, D 203	Stern der Liebe, Glanzgebilde	26/5/1815	Text by Körner (other setting: D 172); For two voices or two horns
204	204	(1892)	XIX; No. 33	III, 4 No. 25	Jägerlied	Frisch auf, ihr Jäger	26/5/1815	Text by Körner; For two voices or two horns
	204A			IV, 8 Anh. No. 4	Das Traumbild		May 1815	Text by Hölty; Music lost
205	205	(1892)	XIX; No. 34	III, 4 No. 26	Lützows wilde Jagd	Was glänzt dort vom Walde im Sonnenschein?	26/5/1815	Text by Körner; For two voices or two horns
206	206	(1872)	XX, 2 No. 75	IV, 8 No. 18	Liebeständelei	Süßes Liebchen	26/5/1815	Text by Körner
207	207	(1894)	XX, 2 No. 76	IV, 8 No. 19	Der Liebende	Beglückt, beglückt	29/5/1815	Text by Hölty
208; 212	208	(1895) (1897)	XX, 2 No. 77; XXII, 11; No. 77	IV, 8 No. 20 & Anh. No. 5	Die Nonne	Es liebt' in Welschland irgendwo	29/5/1815	Text by Hölty, from Balladen, No. 5; Two versions: 1st is fragment, incomplete in AGA – 2nd was D 212
209	209	38 (1825)	XX, 2 No. 98	IV, 2a	Der Liedler	Gib, Schwester, mir die Harf herab	January 1815	Text by Kenner
210	210	(1838)	XX, 2 No. 78	IV, 8 No. 21	Die Liebe, D 210, a.k.a. Klärchens Lied	Freudvoll und leidvoll	3/6/1815	Text by Goethe, from Egmont, Act III, Scene 2, Clärchen's song
211	211	(1894)	XX, 2 No. 79	IV, 8 No. 22	Adelwold und Emma	Hoch und ehern schier von Dauer	5/6/1815– 14/6/1815	Text by Bertrand
212	208							See D 208
213	213	172p,1 (1865)	XX, 2 No. 80	IV, 8 No. 23	Der Traum	Mir träumt', ich war ein Vögelein	17/6/1815	Text by Hölty, from Balladen, No. 6
214	214	172p,2 (1865)	XX, 2 No. 81	IV, 8 No. 24	Die Laube	Nimmer werd' ich, nimmer dein vergessen	17/6/1815	Text by Hölty
215	215	(1906)		IV, 1b No. 4	Jägers Abendlied, D 215	Im Felde schleich ich, still und wild	20/6/1815	Text by Goethe (other setting: D 368)
216	215A	(1952)		IV, 1a & b No. 3	Meeres Stille, D 215A	Tiefe Stille herrscht im Wasser	20/6/1815	Text by Goethe (other setting: D 216)
216	216	3,2 (1821)	XX, 2 No. 82	IV, 1a	Meeres Stille, D 216	Tiefe Stille herrscht im Wasser	21/6/1815	Text by Goethe (other setting: D 215A)
217	217	(1830)	XX, 2 No. 83	IV, 8 No. 25	Kolmas Klage	Rund um mich Nacht	22/6/1815	Text by Macpherson (Ossian), from The Songs of Selma (transl.)
218	218	(1848)	XX, 2 No. 84	IV, 8 No. 26	Grablied	Er fiel den Tod für's Vaterland	24/6/1815	Text by Kenner
219	219	(1848)	XX, 2 No. 85	IV, 8 No. 27	Das Finden	Ich hab ein Mädchen funden	25/6/1815	Text by Kosegarten
220	220	(1888)	XV, 2 No. 3	II, 2	Fernando	(Singspiel in one act)	Jun. 1815– 9/7/1815	Text by Stadler, A.; Music for sstbb and orchestra; Nos. 1–7
221	221	118p,2 (1829)	XX, 2 No. 95	IV, 8 No. 28	Der Abend, D 221	Der Abend blüht, Temora glüht	15/7/1815	Text by Kosegarten
222	222	(1885)	XX, 2 No. 86	IV, 8 No. 29	Lieb Minna: Romanze	Schwüler Hauch weht mir herüber	2/7/1815	Text by Stadler, A.
223	223	47 (1825)	XIV No. 2	I, 8	Salve Regina, D 223, a.k.a. Offertory No. 2	F major Salve Regina	5/7/1815; 28/1/1823	Text: Salve Regina (other settings: D 27, 106, 386, 676 and 811); For s and orchestra; Two versions: 2nd, in AGA, is Op. 47
224	224	4,3 (1821)	XX, 2 No. 87	IV, 1a	Wandrers Nachtlied, D 224	Der du von dem Himmel bist	5/7/1815	Text by Goethe
225	225	5,3 (1821) (1970)	XX, 2 No. 88	IV, 1a & b No. 7	Der Fischer	Das Wasser rauscht', das Wasser schwoll	5/7/1815	Text by Goethe; Two versions: 2nd, in AGA, is Op. 5 No. 3
226	226	5,4 (1821)	XX, 2 No. 89	IV, 1a	Erster Verlust	Ach, wer bringt die schönen Tage	5/7/1815	Text by Goethe
227	227	(1885)	XX, 2 No. 90	IV, 8 No. 30	Idens Nachtgesang	Vernimm es Nacht, was Ida dir vertrauet	7/7/1815	Text by Kosegarten
228	228	(1894)	XX, 2 No. 91	IV, 8 No. 31	Von Ida	Der Morgen blüht, der Osten glüht	7/7/1815	Text by Kosegarten
229	229	108,3 (1824)	XX, 2 No. 92	IV, 5	Die Erscheinung, a.k.a. Erinnerung, D 229	Ich lag auf grünen Matten	7/7/1815	Text by Kosegarten; Publ. as Op. 108 No. 3 in 1829
230	230	165p,4 (1855)	XX, 2 No. 93	IV, 8 No. 32	Die Täuschung	Im Erlenbusch, im Tannenhain	7/7/1815	Text by Kosegarten; Publ. as Op. posth. 165 No. 4 in 1862
231	231	172p,4 (1865)	XX, 2 No. 94	IV, 8 No. 33	Das Sehnen	Wehmut, die mich hüllt	8/7/1815	Text by Kosegarten
232	232	112p,3 (1829)	XVII; No. 8	III, 2a No. 6; 2b Anh. No. 2	Hymne an den Unendlichen	Zwischen Himmel und Erd'	11/7/1815	Text by Schiller; For satb and piano
233	233	118p,1 (1829)	XX, 2 No. 96	IV, 8 No. 34	Geist der Liebe, D 233	Wer bist du, Geist der Liebe	15/7/1815	Text by Kosegarten
234	234	118p,3 (1829)	XX, 2 No. 97	IV, 8 No. 35	Tischlied	Mich ergreift, ich weiß nicht wie	15/7/1815	Text by Goethe
235	235	(1894)	XX, 2 No. 100	IV, 8 No. 36	Abends unter der Linde, D 235	Woher, o namenloses Sehnen	24/7/1815	Text by Kosegarten (other setting: D 237)
236	236	(1892)	XIX; No. 6	III, 2a No. 7	Das Abendrot, D 236	Der Abend blüht, der Westen glüht!	20/7/1815	Text by Kosegarten; for ssb and piano
237	237	(1872)	XX, 2 No. 101	IV, 8 No. 37	Abends unter der Linde, D 237	Woher, o namenloses Sehnen	25/7/1815	Text by Kosegarten (other setting: D 235)
238	238	(1894)	XX, 2 No. 102	IV, 8 No. 38	Die Mondnacht	Siehe, wie die Mondesstrahlen	25/7/1815	Text by Kosegarten
239	239	(1893)	XV, 7 No. 11	II, 14	Claudine von Villa Bella	(Singspiel in three acts)	started 26/7/1815	Text by Goethe; For ssttbbSATB and orchestra; Overture (in AGA) – Nos. 1–8 (Act I, in AGA) – No. 9 (fragment from Act II) – No. 10 (fragment from Act III); Other music lost
240	240	(1894)	XX, 2 No. 103	IV, 8 No. 39	Huldigung	Ganz verloren, ganz versunken	27/7/1815	Text by Kosegarten
241	241	(1894)	XX, 2 No. 104	IV, 8 No. 40	Alles um Liebe	Was ist es, das die Seele füllt?	27/7/1815	Text by Kosegarten
242	242	(1892)	XIX; No. 18	III, 4 No. 27	Trinklied im Winter, a.k.a. Winterlied, D 242	Das Glas gefüllt!	August; 1815?	Text by Hölty (other setting: D 242A); For ttb
	242A			IV, 8 No. 41	Winterabend, D 242A, a.k.a. Winterlied	Das Glas gefüllt!	1815?	Text by Hölty (other setting: D 242)
243	243	(1892)	XIX; No. 19	III, 4 No. 28	Frühlingslied, D 243	Die Luft ist blau	August; 1815?	Text by Hölty (other setting: D 398); For ttb
244	244	(1892)	XIX; No. 27	III, 4 No. 29; VIII, 2 No. 25	Willkommen, lieber schöner Mai	Willkommen, lieber schöner Mai	August; 1815?	Text by Hölty; Canon for three voices in two sections
245	587							See D 587
246	246	(1830)	XX, 3 No. 109	IV, 8 No. 42	Die Bürgschaft, D 246	Zu Dionys, dem Tyrannen	August; 1815	Text by Schiller; Partly reused in D 435
247	247	118p,6 (1829)	XX, 3 No. 119	IV, 8 No. 43	Die Spinnerin	Als ich still und ruhig spann	August; 1815	Text by Goethe
248	248	118p,4 (1829)	XX, 3 No. 135	IV, 8 No. 44	Lob des Tokayers	O köstlicher Tokayer, o königlicher Wein	August; 1815	Text by Baumberg
249	249			III, 2b Anh. No. 4a	Die Schlacht, D 249	Schwer und dumpfig	1/8/1815	Text by Schiller (other setting: D 387); Sketch
250	250	(1872)	XX, 3 No. 105	IV, 13	Das Geheimnis, D 250	Sie konnte mir kein Wörtchen sagen	7/8/1815	Text by Schiller (other setting: D 793)
251	251	(1872)	XX, 3 No. 106	IV, 4	Hoffnung, D 251	Es reden und träumen die Menschen viel	7/8/1815	Text by Schiller (other setting: D 637)
252	252	(1887)	XX, 3 No. 108	IV, 8 No. 46	Das Mädchen aus der Fremde, D 252	In einem Tal bei armen Hirten	12/8/1815	Text by Schiller (other setting: D 117)
253	253	(1887)	XX, 3 No. 110	III, 4 No. 30; IV, 8 No. 47	Punschlied: Im Norden zu singen	Auf der Berge freien Höhen	18/8/1815	Text by Schiller; Two versions: 2nd for two voices
254	254	(1887)	XX, 3 No. 111	IV, 8 No. 48	Der Gott und die Bajadere	Mahadöh, der Herr der Erde	18/8/1815	Text by Goethe
255	255	(1850)	XX, 3 No. 112	IV, 8 No. 49	Der Rattenfänger	Ich bin der wohlbekannte Sänger	19/8/1815	Text by Goethe
256	256	(1887)	XX, 3 No. 113	IV, 8 No. 50	Der Schatzgräber	Arm am Beutel, krank am Herzen	19/8/1815	Text by Goethe
257	257	3,3 (1821)	XX, 3 No. 114	IV, 1a	Heidenröslein	Sah ein Knab' ein Röslein stehn	19/8/1815	Text by Goethe
258	258	(1887)	XX, 3 No. 115	IV, 8 No. 51	Bundeslied	In allen guten Stunden	19/8/1815	Text by Goethe
259	259	(1850)	XX, 3 No. 116	IV, 9 No. 27	An den Mond, D 259	Füllest wieder Busch und Tal	19/8/1815	Text by Goethe (other setting: D 296)
260	260	115p,2 (1829)	XX, 3 No. 117	IV, 8 No. 52	Wonne der Wehmut	Trocknet nicht, trocknet nicht	20/8/1815	Text by Goethe; Reused in D
261	261	(1850)	XX, 3 No. 118	IV, 8 No. 53	Wer kauft Liebesgötter?	Von allen schönen Waren	21/8/1815	Text by Goethe, from Der Zauberflöte zweiter Teil
262	262	(1895)	XX, 3 No. 134	IV, 9 No. 1	Die Fröhlichkeit	Wess' Adern leichtes Blut durchspringt	22/8/1815	Text by Prandstätter
263	263	(1848)	XX, 3 No. 123	IV, 9 No. 2	Cora an die Sonne	Nach so vielen trüben Tagen	22/8/1815	Text by Baumberg
264	264	(1850) (1872)	XX, 3 No. 124	IV, 9 No. 3	Der Morgenkuß	Durch eine ganze Nacht sich nah zu sein	22/8/1815	Text by Baumberg; Two versions: 2nd, publ. in 1850, in AGA
265	265	(1895)	XX, 3 No. 125	IV, 9 No. 4	Abendständchen: An Lina	Sei sanft wie ihre Seele	23/8/1815	Text by Baumberg
266	266	(1895)	XX, 3 No. 126	IV, 9 No. 5	Morgenlied, D 266	Willkommen, rotes Morgenlicht!	24/8/1815	Text by Stolberg-Stolberg
267	267	(1872)	XVI; No. 17	III, 3 No. 19	Trinklied, D 267	Auf! Jeder sei nun froh und sorgenfrei!	25/8/1815	For ttbb and piano
268	268	(1872)	XVI; No. 18	III, 3 No. 20	Bergknappenlied	Hinab, ihr Brüder, in den Schacht!	25/8/1815	For ttbb and piano
269	269	(1848)	XVIII; No. 5	III, 3 No. 5 Anh. IV No. 2	Das Leben	Das Leben ist ein Traum	25/8/1815	Text by Wannovius; Two versions: 1st for tbb and piano – 2nd, in AGA, for ssa and piano
270	270	118p,5 (1829)	XX, 3 No. 127	IV, 9 No. 6	An die Sonne, D 270	Sinke, liebe Sonne	25/8/1815	Text by Baumberg
271	271	(1895)	XX, 3 No. 128	IV, 9 No. 7	Der Weiberfreund	Noch fand von Evens Töchterscharen ich keine	25/8/1815	Text by Ratschky, after Cowley
272	272	(1872)	XX, 3 No. 129	IV, 9 No. 8	An die Sonne, D 272	Königliche Morgensonne	25/8/1815	Text by Tiedge
273	273	(1895)	XX, 3 No. 130	IV, 9 No. 9	Lilla an die Morgenröte	Wie schön bist du, du güldne Morgenröte	25/8/1815	
274	274	(1850)	XX, 3 No. 131	IV, 9 No. 10	Tischlerlied	Mein Handwerk geht durch alle Welt	25/8/1815	
275	275	(1895)	XX, 3 No. 132	IV, 9 No. 11	Totenkranz für ein Kind	Sanft wehn, im Hauch der Abendluft	25/8/1815	Text by Matthisson
276	276	(1895)	XX, 3 No. 133	IV, 9 No. 12	Abendlied, D 276	Groß und rotenflammet	28/8/1815	Text by Stolberg-Stolberg
277	277	(1892)	XIX; No. 7	III, 3 No. 6	Punschlied, D 277	Vier Elemente, inning gesellt	29/8/1815	Text by Schiller; For ttb and piano
	277A	(1925)		VII/2, 4	Minuet with Trio, D 277A	A minor (minuet) / F major (trio)	September; 1815?	For piano; Partly reused in D 279
278	278	(1830) (1897)	XX, 3 No. 147; XXII, 11; No. 147	IV, 9 No. 13 Anh. No. 1	Ossians Lied nach dem Falle Nathos	Beugt euch aus euren Wolken nieder	1815	Text by Macpherson (Ossian), from Dar-Thula, transl. by E. Baron de Harold; Two versions: 1st is a fragment – 2nd publ. in 1830
279	279	(1888)	X No. 2	VII/2, 1 No. 2	Piano Sonata, D 279	C major	September; 1815	Allegro moderato – Andante – Minuet (partly based on D 277A); D 309A, or 346, may be 4th movement
280	280	(1837)	XX, 3 No. 139	IV, 9 No. 14	Das Rosenband	Im Frühlingsgarten fand ich sie	September; 1815	Text by Klopstock
281	281	(1830)	XX, 3 No. 148	IV, 9 No. 15	Das Mädchen von Inistore	Mädchen Inistores, wein auf dem Felsen	September; 1815	Text by Macpherson (Ossian), from Fingal, Book I, transl. by E. Baron de Harold
282	282	(1830)	XX, 4 No. 188	IV, 9 No. 16	Cronnan	Ich sitz' bei der moosigten Quelle	5/9/1815	Text by Macpherson (Ossian), from Carric-thura, transl. by E. Baron de Harold
283	283	172p,5 (1865)	XX, 3 No. 136	IV, 11	An den Frühling, D 283	Willkommen, schöner Jüngling!	6/9/1815	Text by Schiller (other settings: D 338 and 587)
284	284	(1895)	XX, 3 No. 137	IV, 9 No. 17	Lied, D 284	Es ist so angenehm, so süß	6/9/1815	Text by Schiller(?)
285	285	(1885) (1895)	XX, 3 No. 138	IV, 9 No. 18 Anh. No. 2	Furcht der Geliebten, a.k.a. An Cidli	Cidli, du weinest	12/9/1815	Text by Klopstock, from Oden; Two versions: 2nd publ. in 1885
286	286	(1837) (1895)	XX, 3 No. 140	IV, 9 No. 19	Selma und Selmar	Weine du nicht	14/9/1815	Text by Klopstock; Two versions: 2nd publ. in 1837
287	287	(1895)	XX, 3 No. 141	IV, 9 No. 20	Vaterlandslied	Ich bin ein deutsches Mädchen	14/9/1815	Text by Klopstock, from Oden; Two versions
288	288	(1895)	XX, 3 No. 142	IV, 9 No. 21	An Sie	Zeit, Verkündigerin der besten Freuden	14/9/1815	Text by Klopstock, from Oden
289	289	(1895)	XX, 3 No. 143	IV, 9 No. 22	Die Sommernacht	Wenn der Schimmer von dem Monde	14/9/1815	Text by Klopstock; Two versions
290	290	(1837)	XX, 3 No. 144	IV, 9 No. 23	Die frühen Gräber	Willkommen, o silberner Mond	14/9/1815	Text by Klopstock, from Oden
291	291	(1831) (1895)	XX, 3 No. 145	IV, 9 No. 24	Dem Unendlichen	Wie erhebt sich das Herz	15/9/1815	Text by Klopstock; Three versions: 2nd publ. in 1831
292	371							See D 371
293	293	(1830)	XX, 3 No. 146	IV, 9 No. 25	Shilric und Vinvela	Mein Geliebter ist ein Sohn des Hügels	20/9/1815	Text by Macpherson (Ossian), from Carric-thura, transl. by E. Baron de Harold
294	294	(1892)	XVII; No. 4	III, 1	Namensfeier für Franz Michael Vierthaler, a.k.a. Gratulations-Kantate	Erhabner! Verehrter Freund der Jugend!	27/9/1815	For stbSTB and orchestra
295	295	(1872) (1895)	XX, 3 No. 175	IV, 9 No. 26	Hoffnung, D 295	Schaff, das Tagwerk meiner Hände	1815 or 1816?	Text by Goethe; Two versions: 1st publ. in 1872
296	296	(1868)	XX, 3 No. 176	IV, 9 No. 28	An den Mond, D 296	Füllest wieder Busch und Tal	1815 or 1816?	Text by Goethe (other setting: D 259)
297	297	(1850) (1895)	XX, 3 No. 171	IV, 9 No. 29 Anh. No. 3	Augenlied	Süße Augen, klare Bronnen!	spring 1817?	Text by Mayrhofer; Two versions: 2nd publ. in 1850
298	298	(1895)	XX, 3 No. 170	IV, 9 No. 30	Liane	Hast du Lianen nicht gesehen?	October; 1815	Text by Mayrhofer
299	299	(1897) (1912)	XXI, 3 No. 29	VII/2, 6	Twelve Écossaises, D 299	Various keys	3/10/1815	For piano; No. 1 similar to D 145 Écoss. No. 1; Nos. 9–12 publ. in 1912
300	300	(1842)	XX, 6 No. 398	IV, 9 No. 31	Der Jüngling an der Quelle	Leise, rieselnder Quell	1816 or 1817?	Text by Salis-Seewis
301	301	(1842)	XX, 3 No. 149	IV, 9 No. 32	Lambertine	O Liebe, die mein Herz erfüllet	12/10/1815	Text by Stoll
302	302	(1895)	XX, 3 No. 150	IV, 9 No. 33	Labetrank der Liebe	Wenn im Spiele leiser Töne	15/10/1815	Text by Stoll
303	303	(1887)	XX, 3 No. 151	IV, 9 No. 34	An die Geliebte	O, daß ich dir vom stillen Auge	15/10/1815	Text by Stoll; Music partly reused in D 497
304	304	(1895)	XX, 3 No. 152	IV, 9 No. 35	Wiegenlied, D 304	Schlumm're sanft! Noch an dem Mutterherzen	15/10/1815	Text by Körner
305	305	(1895)	XX, 3 No. 153	IV, 9 No. 36	Mein Gruß an den Mai	Sei mir gegrüßt, o Mai	15/10/1815	Text by Kumpf
306	306	(1895)	XX, 3 No. 154	IV, 9 No. 37	Skolie, D 306	Laßt im Morgenstrahl des Mai'n	15/10/1815	Text by Deinhardstein
307	307	(1895)	XX, 3 No. 155	IV, 9 No. 38	Die Sternenwelten	Oben drehen sich die großen unbekannten Welten dort	15/10/1815	Text by Fellinger, after Jarnik
308	308	(1895)	XX, 3 No. 156	IV, 9 No. 39	Die Macht der Liebe	Überall, wohin mein Auge blicket	15/10/1815	Text by Kalchberg
309	309	(1872)	XX, 3 No. 157	IV, 9 No. 40	Das gestörte Glück	Ich hab' ein heißes junges Blut	15/10/1815	Text by Körner
	309A			VII/2, 1 Anh. No. 2	Rondo, D 309A	C major	1815	For piano; Fragment; 4th movement of D 279?
310	310	(1895)	XX, 3 No. 158	IV, 3	Sehnsucht, D 310, a.k.a. Lied der Mignon	Nur wer die Sehnsucht kennt	18/10/1815	Text by Goethe, from Wilhelm Meister's Apprenticeship (other settings: D 359, 481, 656 and 877 Nos. 1 & 4); Two versions
311	311			IV, 9 Anh. No. 3	An den Mond, D 311		19/10/1815?	For voice and piano; Sketch without text
312	312	58,1 (1826) (1895)	XX, 3 No. 159	IV, 3	Hektors Abschied	Will sich Hektor ewig von mir wenden	19/10/1815	Text by Schiller; Two versions: 2nd is Op. 58 No. 1
313	313	(1895)	XX, 3 No. 160	IV, 9 No. 41	Die Sterne, D 313	Wie wohl ist mir im Dunkeln!	19/10/1815	Text by Kosegarten
314	314	(1887)	XX, 3 No. 161	IV, 9 No. 42	Nachtgesang, D 314	Tiefe Feier schauert um die Welt	19/10/1815	Text by Kosegarten
315	315	(1895)	XX, 3 No. 162	IV, 9 No. 43	An Rosa I	Warum bist du nicht hier	19/10/1815	Text by Kosegarten
316	316	(1895)	XX, 3 No. 163	IV, 9 No. 44	An Rosa II	Rosa, denkst du an mich?	19/10/1815	Text by Kosegarten; Two versions
317	317	(1895)	XX, 3 No. 164	IV, 9 No. 45	Idens Schwanenlied	Wie schaust du aus dem Nebelflor	19/10/1815	Text by Kosegarten; Two versions: 2nd in AGA
318	318	(1895)	XX, 3 No. 165	IV, 9 No. 46	Schwangesang	Endlich stehn die Pforten offen	19/10/1815	Text by Kosegarten
319	319	(1895)	XX, 3 No. 166	IV, 9 No. 47	Luisens Antwort	Wohl weinen Gottes Engel	19/10/1815	Text by Kosegarten
320	320	(1895)	XX, 3 No. 167	IV, 9 No. 48	Der Zufriedene	Zwar schuf das Glück hienieden	23/10/1815	Text by Reissig
321	321	(1832)	XX, 3 No. 168	IV, 9 No. 49	Mignon a.k.a. Mignons Gesang	Kennst du das Land	23/10/1815	Text by Goethe, from Wilhelm Meister's Apprenticeship III, 1
322	322	(1837)	XX, 3 No. 169	IV, 9 No. 50	Hermann und Thusnelda	Ha, dort kömmt er	27/10/1815	Text by Klopstock
323; 991	323	(1895)	XX, 3 No. 172	IV, 9 No. 51 Anh. Nos. 5–6	Klage der Ceres	Ist der holde Lenz erschienen?	9/11/1815– June 1816	Text by Schiller; Two versions: 2nd in AGA; A fragment of the last part was D 991
324	324	141p (1837)	XIII, 1 No. 3	I, 2	Mass No. 3	B♭ major Kyrie – Gloria – Credo – Sanctus & Benedictus – Agnus Dei	started 11/11/1815	Text: Mass ordinary (other settings: D 24E, 31, 45, 49, 56, 66, 105, 167, 452, 678, 755 and 950); For satbSATB and orchestra
	324A			IV, 8 No. 41	Winterlied, D 324A		1816?	
325	325	(1895)	XX, 3 No. 173	IV, 1b No. 9	Harfenspieler, D 325	Wer sich der Einsamkeit ergibt	13/11/1815	Text by Goethe, from Wilhelm Meister's Apprenticeship (other setting: D 478 No. 1)
326	326	(1888)	XV, 2 No. 4	II, 3	Die Freunde von Salamanka	(Singspiel in two acts)	18/11/1815– 31/12/1815	Text by Mayrhofer; Music for ssstttbbbbbbSATB and orchestra; Overture – Act I (Nos. 1–7) – Act II (Nos. 8–18, with music of No. 12 reappearing in D 803 and of No. 14 in D 796 No. 15)
327	327			IV, 10	Lorma, D 327	Lorma saß in der Halle von Aldo	28/11/1815	Text by Macpherson (Ossian), from The Battle of Lora, transl. by E. Baron de Harold (other setting: D 376); Fragment
328	328	1 (1821) (1895)	XX, 3 No. 178	IV, 1a & b No. 1	Erlkönig	Wer reitet so spät durch Nacht und Wind?	October; 1815?	Text by Goethe; Four versions: 2nd and 3rd switched in AGA – 4th is Op. 1
329	329	(1895)	XX, 10; No. 591	IV, 9 Anh. No. 7	Die drei Sänger	Der König saß beim frohen Mahle	23/12/1815	Text by Bobrik; Fragment
	329A			III, 2b Anh. No. 3 VIII, 2 No. 27	Das Grab, D 329A	Das Grab ist tief und stille	28/12/1815?	Text by Salis-Seewis (other settings: D 330, 377, 569 and 643A); Canon for SATB; Sketch
330	330	(1895)	XX, 3 No. 182	III, 3 No. 14; Anh. I No. 2	Das Grab, D 330	Das Grab ist tief und stille	28/12/1815	Text by Salis-Seewis (other settings: D 329A, 377, 569 and 643A); For choir and piano
331–510							1816	Up ↑
331; 332	331	(1866)	XVI; No. 38	III, 4 No. 31	Der Entfernten, D 331	Wohl denk' ich allenthalben	c. 1816	Text by Salis-Seewis (other setting: D 350); For ttbb; Identical to former D 332
333	796				Laß dein Vertrauen nicht schwinden			Part of D 796 No. 21
334	334	(1897)	XXI, 3 No. 24	VII/2, 4	Minuet with Trio, D 334	A major (minuet) / E major (trio)	before fall 1815	For piano
335	335	(1897)	XXI, 3 No. 25	VII/2, 6	Minuet with two Trios	E major	1813?	For piano
337	337	(1860)	XVI; No. 39	III, 4 No. 32	Die Einsiedelei, D 337, a.k.a. Lob der Einsamkeit	Es rieselt klar und wehend ein Quell	c. 1816	Text by Salis-Seewis (other settings: D 393 and 563); For ttbb
338	338	(1891)	XVI; No. 40	III, 4 No. 33	An den Frühling, D 338	Willkommen, schöner Jüngling!	c. 1816	Text by Schiller (other settings: D 283 and 587); For ttbb
342	342	(1885)	XX, 4 No. 238	IV, 10	An mein Klavier a.k.a. Seraphine an ihr Klavier	Sanftes Klavier, welche Entzückungen schaffest du mir	c. 1816	Text by Schubart
343	343	(1831)	XX, 5 No. 342	IV, 10	Am Tage Aller Seelen a.k.a. Litanei auf das Fest Aller Seelen	Ruh'n in Frieden alle Seelen	August; 1816	Text by Jacobi; Two versions: 1st, in AGA, publ. in 1831
344	344			IV, 10	Am ersten Maimorgen	Heute will ich fröhlich sein	1816?	Text by Claudius
345	345	(1897)	XXI, 1 No. 3	V, 7 No. 1	Violin Concerto, a.k.a. Konzertstück (Concert Piece)	D major	1816	Adagio, Allegro
346	346	(1897)	XXI, 3 No. 17	VII/2, 4 Anh.	Allegretto, D 346	C major	1816?	For piano; Fragment; 4th movement of D 279?
347	347	(1897)	XXI, 3 No. 18	VII/2, 4 Anh.	Allegro moderato, D 347	C major	1813?	For piano; Fragment
348	348	(1897)	XXI, 3 No. 19	VII/2, 4 Anh.	Andantino, D 348	C major	1816?	For piano; Fragment
349	349	(1897)	XXI, 3 No. 21	VII/2, 4 Anh.	Adagio, D 349	C major	1816?	For piano; Fragment
350	350	(1885)	XX, 4 No. 203	IV, 10	Der Entfernten, D 350	Wohl denk' ich allenthalben	1816?	Text by Salis-Seewis (other setting: D 331)
351	351	(1895)	XX, 4 No. 204	IV, 11	Fischerlied, D 351	Das Fischergewerbe gibt rüstigen Mut	1816?	Text by Salis-Seewis (other settings: D 364 and 562)
352	352	(1847)	XX, 4 No. 286	III, 2b No. 21	Licht und Liebe a.k.a. Nachtgesang	Liebe ist ein süßes Licht	1816?	Text by Collin, M. C.; For st and piano
353	353	125p,2 (1840)	V No. 11	VI, 4 No. 12	String Quartet No. 11	E major	1816	Allegro con fuoco – Andante – Minuet – Rondo
354	354	(1930)		VI, 9	Four Komische Ländler	D major	January; 1816	For two violins
355	355	(1928)		VI, 9	Eight Ländler, D 355	F♯ minor	January; 1816	For violin(?)
356	356	(1844)		III, 3 Anh. II No. 3	Trinklied, D 356	Funkelnd im Becher so helle, so hold	1816	For vocal soloist, TTBB and piano; Piano part lost (by Czerny in 1844 ed.)
357	357	(1892)	XIX; No. 24	III, 4 No. 35; VIII, 2 No. 28	Goldner Schein	Goldner Schein deckt den Hain	1/5/1816	Text by Matthisson; Canon for three voices
358	358	(1849)	XX, 4 No. 235	IV, 10	Die Nacht, D 358	Du verstörst uns nicht, o Nacht!	1816	Text by Uz
359	359	(1872)	XX, 4 No. 260	IV, 3	Sehnsucht, D 359 a.k.a. Lied der Mignon	Nur wer die Sehnsucht kennt	1816	Text by Goethe, from Wilhelm Meister's Apprenticeship (other settings: D 310, 481, 656 and 877 Nos. 1 & 4)
360	360	65,1 (1826)	XX, 4 No. 268	IV, 3	Lied eines Schiffers an die Dioskuren	Dioskuren, Zwillingssterne	1816	Text by Mayrhofer
361	361	109p,1 (1829)	XX, 4 No. 272	IV, 10	Am Bach im Frühling	Du brachst sie nun, die kalte Rinde	1816	Text by Schober; Piano intro probably not by Schubert
362	362	(1895)	XX, 4 No. 280	IV, 11	Zufriedenheit, D 362, a.k.a. Lied	Ich bin vergnugt	1815 or 1816?	Text by Claudius (other setting: D 501)
363	363			IV, 10	An Chloen, D 363	Die Munterkeit ist meinen Wangen	1816	Text by Uz; Fragment
364	364	(1897)	XXI, 4 No. 35	III, 4 No. 34	Fischerlied, D 364	Das Fischergewerbe gibt rüstigen Mut	1816 or 1817?	Text by Salis-Seewis (other settings: D 351 and 562); For ttbb
365	365	9 (1821)	XII; No. 1	VII/2, 6 & 7a	36 Original Dances a.k.a. Erste Walzer	Various keys	c. Mar. 1818– Jul. 1821	For piano; No. 2 publ. in 1826 as Beethoven's (Kinksky Anh. 14 No. 1)
366	366	(1824) (1869)	XII; No. 10	VII/2, 6 & 7a	17 Ländler, D 366	Various keys	c. Jul. 1824– Nov. 1824	For piano; Nos. 6 and 17 publ. in 1824; No. 7 partly reappears in D 618 and No. 17 in D 814
367	367	5,5 (1821)	XX, 4 No. 261	IV, 1a	Der König in Thule	Es war ein König in Thule	early 1816	Text by Goethe, from Faust I, 8
368	368	3,4 (1821)	XX, 4 No. 262	IV, 1a	Jägers Abendlied, D 368	Im Felde schleich ich, still und wild	early 1816?	Text by Goethe (other setting: D 215)
369	369	19,1 (1825)	XX, 4 No. 263	IV, 1a	An Schwager Kronos	Spute dich, Kronos!	1816	Text by Goethe
370	370	(1930)		VI, 9	Nine Ländler, D 370	D major	January; 1816	For violin?; No. 7 reused in D 378 No. 6
371; 292	371	(1872)	XX, 4 No. 185	IV, 10	Klage, D 371	Trauer umfließt mein Leben	January; 1816	Two versions: 1st, a sketch, was D 292
372	372	(1895)	XX, 4 No. 183	IV, 10	An die Natur	Süße, heilige Natur	15/1/1816	Text by Stolberg-Stolberg
373	373	(1895)	XX, 4 No. 184	IV, 10	Lied, D 373	Mutter geht durch ihre Kammern	15/1/1816?	Text by Motte Fouqué, from Undine
374	374	(1902)		VI, 9	11 Ländler, D 374	B♭ major	February; 1816?	For violin; Nos. 1–3, 5, 7 and 11 reused in Nos. 1–5 and 7 of D 378; No. 2 also partly in D 146 No. 10
375	375	(1830)	XX, 4 No. 187	IV, 10	Der Tod Oskars	Warum öffnest du wieder	February; 1816	Text by Macpherson (Ossian), transl. by E. Baron de Harold
376	376	(1895)	XX, 10; No. 592	IV, 10	Lorma, D 376	Lorma saß in der Halle von Aldo	10/2/1816	Text by Macpherson (Ossian), from The Battle of Lora, transl. by E. Baron de Harold (other setting: D 327); Fragment
377	377	(1872)	XX, 4 No. 186	III, 3 No. 21; Anh. I No. 3	Das Grab, D 377	Das Grab ist tief und stille	11/2/1816	Text by Salis-Seewis (other settings: D 329A, 330, 569 and 643A); For TTBB and piano
378	378	(1889)	XII; No. 12	VII/2, 6	Eight Ländler, D 378	B♭ major	13/2/1816	For piano; Nos. 1–5 and 7 reuse D 374 Nos. 1–3, 7, 11 and 5; No. 2 partly in D 146 No. 10; No. 6 reuses D 370 No. 7
379	379	(1859)	XIV No. 17	I, 9 No. 13 & Anh. 2	Deutsches Salve Regina (German Salve Regina)	Sei, Mutter der Barmherzigkeit; F major	21/2/1816	Text: after Salve Regina; For SATB and organ
380	380	(1897) (1956) (1989)	XXI, 2 No. 28	VII/2, 6	Three Minuets, each with Two Trios	E major (No. 1); A major (No. 2); C major (No. 3)	22/2/1816	For piano; AGA only Nos. 1–2; Start of No. 3, a fragment (1st trio incomplete, 2nd trio missing), reused in D 557
381	381	(1895)	XX, 4 No. 189	IV, 10	Morgenlied, D 381	Die frohe, neubelebte Flur	24/2/1816	
382	382	(1895)	XX, 4 No. 190	IV, 10	Abendlied, D 382	Sanft glänzt die Abendsonne	24/2/1816	
383; 992	383	(1888)	XIV No. 13	I, 7	Stabat Mater, D 383, a.k.a. Deutsches Stabat Mater (German Stabat Mater)	Jesus Christus schwebt am Kreuze; F minor	started 28/2/1816	Text by Klopstock after Stabat Mater; For stbSATB and orchestra; Sketch for Nos. 5–6 was D 992
384	384	137p,1 (1836)	VIII; No. 2	VI, 8 No. 1 & anh. 1	Violin Sonata, D 384, a.k.a. Sonatina No. 1	D major	March 1816	Allegro molto (+early version in NSA) – Andante – Allegro vivace
385	385	137p,2 (1836)	VIII; No. 3	VI, 8 No. 2	Violin Sonata, D 385, a.k.a. Sonatina No. 2	A minor	March 1816	Allegro moderato – Andante – Minuet – Allegro
386	386	(1833)	XIV No. 20	I, 9 No. 12 & Anh. 1	Salve Regina, D 386	B♭ major Salve Regina	early 1816	Text: Salve Regina (other settings: D 27, 106, 223, 676 and 811); For SATB
387	387	(1897)	XXI, 4 No. 44	III, 2b Anh. No. 4b	Die Schlacht, D 387	Schwer und dumpfig	March 1816	Text by Schiller (other setting: D 249); Sketch for vocal soloists, choir and piano; Music partly in D 249 and 602 No. 1
388	388	(1895)	XX, 4 No. 193	IV, 10	Laura am Klavier	Wenn dein Finger durch die Saiten meistert	March 1816	Text by Schiller; Two versions
389	389	(1873)	XX, 4 No. 194	IV, 3	Des Mädchens Klage, D 389	Der Eichwald brauset	March 1816	Text by Schiller, from Wallenstein: Die Piccolomini III, 7 (other settings: D 6 and 191)
390	390	(1895)	XX, 4 No. 195	IV, 10	Entzückung an Laura, D 390	Laura, über diese Welt	March 1816	Text by Schiller (other setting: D 577)
391	391	111p,3 (1829)	XX, 4 No. 196	IV, 10	Die vier Weltalter	Wohl perlet im Glase	March 1816	Text by Schiller
392	392	(1895)	XX, 4 No. 197	IV, 10	Pflügerlied	Arbeitsam und wacker	March 1816	Text by Salis-Seewis
393	393	(1845)	XX, 4 No. 198	IV, 11	Die Einsiedelei, D 393	Es rieselt klar und wehend ein Quell	March 1816	Text by Salis-Seewis (other settings: D 337 and 563)
394	394	(1895)	XX, 4 No. 199	IV, 10	An die Harmonie a.k.a. Gesang an die Harmonie	Schöpferin beseelter Töne!	March 1816	Text by Salis-Seewis
395	395	111p,2 (1829)	XX, 4 No. 205	IV, 10	Lebensmelodien	Auf den Wassern wohnt mein stilles Leben	March 1816	Text by Schlegel, A. W.
396	396	(1975)		IV, 2 Anh. No. 1	Gruppe aus dem Tartarus, D 396	Horch, wie Murmeln des empörten Meeres	March 1816	Text by Schiller (other settings: D 65 and 583); Fragment
397	397	(1832)	XX, 4 No. 191	IV, 10	Ritter Toggenburg	Ritter, treue Schwesterliebe	13/3/1816	Text by Schiller
398	398	(1887)	XX, 4 No. 217	IV, 10	Frühlingslied, D 398	Die Luft ist blau	13/5/1816	Text by Hölty (other setting: D 243)
399	399	(1895)	XX, 4 No. 218	IV, 10	Auf den Tod einer Nachtigall, D 399	Sie ist dahin, die Maienlieder tönte	13/5/1816	Text by Hölty (other setting: D 201)
400	400	(1895)	XX, 4 No. 219	IV, 10	Die Knabenzeit	Wie glücklich, wem das Knabenkleid	13/5/1816	Text by Hölty
401	401	(1895)	XX, 4 No. 220	IV, 10	Winterlied, D 401	Keine Blumen blühn	13/5/1816	Text by Hölty
402	402	(1872)	XX, 4 No. 192	IV, 10	Der Flüchtling	Frisch atmet des Morgens lebendiger Hauch	18/3/1816	Text by Schiller (other setting: D 67)
403	403	(1845) (1895)	XX, 4 No. 201	IV, 10	Lied, D 403	In's stille Land	27/3/1816	Text by Salis-Seewis; Four versions: 1st, publ. in 1845, and 2nd in AGA; Music partly reappears in D 877 No. 4
404	404	(1885)	XX, 4 No. 200	IV, 10	Die Herbstnacht a.k.a. Die Wehmuth	Mit leisen Harfentönen	March 1816	Text by Salis-Seewis
405	405	(1895)	XX, 4 No. 202	IV, 10	Der Herbstabend	Abendglockenhalle zittern	April 1816	Text by Salis-Seewis; Two versions: 1st in AGA
406	406	(1887)	XX, 4 No. 208	IV, 10	Abschied von der Harfe	Noch einmal tön, o Harfe	March 1816	Text by Salis-Seewis
407; 441	407	(1891) (1892)	XVI; No. 44; XIX; No. 5	III, 3 No. 22; Anh. IV No. 3 VIII, 2 No. 31	Beitrag zur fünfzigjährigen Jubelfeier des Herrn von Salieri	Gütigster, Bester! Weisester Größter! – So Güt’ als Weisheit strömen mild – Unser aller Großpapa, bleibe noch recht lange da	before 16/6/1816	Text by Schubert; Quartet for ttbb (variant for ttb and piano: formerly D 441) – Aria for t and piano – Canon for three voices
408	408	137p,3 (1836)	VIII; No. 4	VI, 8 No. 3	Violin Sonata, D 408, a.k.a. Sonatina No. 3	G minor	April 1816	Allegro giusto – Andante – Minuet – Allegro moderato
409	409	(1872)	XX, 4 No. 206	IV, 10	Die verfehlte Stunde	Quälend ungestilltes Sehnen	April 1816	Text by Schlegel, A. W.
410	410	115p,3 (1829)	XX, 4 No. 207	IV, 10	Sprache der Liebe	Laß dich mit gelinden Schlägen rühren	April 1816	Text by Schlegel, A. W.
411	411	(1887)	XX, 4 No. 209	IV, 10	Daphne am Bach	Ich hab' ein Bächlein funden	April 1816	Text by Stolberg-Stolberg
412	412	(1838)	XX, 4 No. 210	IV, 10	Stimme der Liebe, D 412	Meine Selinde	April 1816	Text by Stolberg-Stolberg; Two versions: 2nd in AGA
413	413	(1895)	XX, 4 No. 211	IV, 10	Entzückung	Tag voll Himmel!	April 1816	Text by Matthisson
414	414	(1895)	XX, 4 No. 212	IV, 10	Geist der Liebe, D 414	Der Abend schleiert Flur und Hain	April 1816	Text by Matthisson (other setting: D 747)
415	415	(1895)	XX, 4 No. 213	IV, 10	Klage, D 415	Die Sonne steigt, die Sonne sinkt	April 1816	Text by Matthisson
416	416	(1825)		IV, 10	Lied in der Abwesenheit	Ach, mir ist das Herz so schwer	April 1816	Text by Stolberg-Stolberg; Fragment
417	417	(1884)	I, 2 No. 4	V, 2 No. 4	Symphony No. 4 Tragic	C minor	completed 27/4/1816	Adagio molto, Allegro vivace – Andante – Minuet – Allegro
418	418	(1895)	XX, 4 No. 214	IV, 10	Stimme der Liebe, D 418	Abendgewölke schweben hell	29/4/1816	Text by Matthisson (other setting: D 187)
419	419	(1895)	XX, 4 No. 215	IV, 10	Julius an Theone	Nimmer, nimmer darf ich dir gestehen	30/4/1816	Text by Matthisson
420	420	(1871)	XII; No. 11	VII/2, 7a	Twelve German Dances, D 420	Various keys	1816	For piano; No. 10 reappears in D 679 No. 1
421	421	(1889)	XII; No. 27	VII/2, 6	Six Écossaises, D 421	Various keys	May 1816	For piano; No. 1 after D 145 Écoss. No. 5
422	422	16,2 (1823)	XVI; No. 8	III, 3 No. 23	Naturgenuß, D 422	Im Abendschimmer wallt der Quell	1822?	Text by Matthisson (other setting: D 188); For ttbb and piano
423	423	(1974)		III, 4 No. 36	Andenken, D 423	Ich denke dein wenn durch den Hain	May 1816	Text by Matthisson (other setting: D 99); For ttb
424	424	(1974)		III, 4 No. 37	Erinnerungen, D 424	Am Seegestad, in lauen Vollmondsnächten	May 1816	Text by Matthisson (other setting: D 98); For ttb
425	425				Lebensbild		May 1816	Lost: may be related to D Anh. I/23 with the same lyrics as D 508; For ttb
426	426			III, 4	Trinklied, D 426	Herr Bacchus ist ein braver Mann	May 1816	Lost; Text by Bürger; For ttb
427	427	(1892)	XIX; No. 17	III, 4 No. 38	Trinklied im Mai	Bekränzet die Tonnen	May 1816	Text by Hölty; For ttb
428	428	(1974)		III, 4 No. 39	Widerhall	Auf ewig dein, wenn Berg und Meere trennen	May 1816	Text by Matthisson; For ttb
429	429	(1885)	XX, 4 No. 221	IV, 10	Minnelied	Holder klingt der Vogelsang	May 1816	Text by Hölty
430	430	(1895)	XX, 4 No. 222	IV, 10	Die frühe Liebe	Schon im bunten Knabenkleide	May 1816	Text by Hölty; Two versions: 1st in AGA
431	431	(1887)	XX, 4 No. 223	IV, 10	Blumenlied	Es ist ein halbes Himmelreich	May 1816	Text by Hölty
432	432	(1850) (1895)	XX, 4 No. 224	IV, 10	Der Leidende a.k.a. Klage, D 432	Nimmer trag' ich langer	May 1816	Other setting: D Anh. I/28; Two versions: 1st publ. in 1850
433	433	(1895)	XX, 4 No. 225	IV, 10	Seligkeit	Freuden sonder Zahl	May 1816	Text by Hölty
434	434	(1850)	XX, 4 No. 226	IV, 10	Erntelied	Sicheln schallen, Ähren fallen	May 1816	Text by Hölty
435	435	(1893)	XV, 7 No. 13	II, 13; III, 4 No. 30	Die Bürgschaft, D 435	(Opera in three acts)	started 2/5/1816	For four sopranos, three tenors, three basses, two baritones, SATB and orchestra; Unfinished: Nos. 1–9 (Act I) – Nos. 10–14 (Act II, No. 13 in NSA III, 4, No. 14 reuses part of D 246) – Nos. 15–16 (Act III, No. 16 is fragment)
436; 437	436	(1850)	XX, 4 No. 216	IV, 10	Klage, D 436	Dein Silber schien durch Eichengrün	12/5/1816	Text by Hölty; Two versions: 1st publ. in 1850 – 2nd was D 437
438	438	(1897)	XXI, 1 No. 4	V, 7 No. 2	Rondo, D 438	A major	June 1816	For violin and string orchestra
439	439	(1872)	XVII; No. 12	III, 2a No. 8	An die Sonne, D 439	O Sonne, Königin der Welt	June 1816	Text by Uz; For satb and piano
440	440	(1839)	XVII; No. 18	III, 2a No. 9	Chor der Engel	Christ ist erstanden	June 1816	Text by Goethe, from Faust I, 1; For SATB
441	407							See D 407
442	442	(1847)	XX, 4 No. 227	III, 3 No. 7 Anh. I No. 4 IV, 10	Das große Halleluja	Ehre sei dem Hocherhabnen	June 1816	Text by Klopstock; For voice(s?) and piano
443	443	(1895)	XX, 4 No. 228	III, 3 No. 8 Anh. I No. 5 IV, 10	Schlachtlied, D 443, a.k.a. Schlachtgesang	Mit unserm Arm ist nichts getan	June 1816	Text by Klopstock, from Oden (other setting: D 912); For voice(s?) and piano
444	444	(1831)	XX, 4 No. 229	IV, 10	Die Gestirne	Es tönet sein Lob	June 1816	Text by Klopstock, from Oden
445	445	(1837)	XX, 4 No. 230	IV, 10	Edone	Dein süßes Bild, Edone	June 1816	Text by Klopstock, from Oden
446	446	(1887)	XX, 4 No. 231	IV, 10	Die Liebesgötter	Cypris, meiner Phyllis gleich	June 1816	Text by Uz
447	447	(1895)	XX, 4 No. 232	IV, 10	An den Schlaf	Komm und senke die umflorten Schwingen	June 1816	
448	448	(1887)	XX, 4 No. 233	IV, 10	Gott im Frühlinge	In seinem schimmernden Gewand	June 1816	Text by Uz; Two versions: 1st, publ. in 1887, in AGA
449	449	(1872)	XX, 4 No. 234	IV, 10	Der gute Hirt	Was sorgest du?	June 1816	Text by Uz
450	450	(1832) (1895)	XX, 4 No. 236	IV, 10	Fragment from Aeschylus	So wird der Mann	June 1816	Text by Mayrhofer after Aeschylus' Eumenides (Oresteia III); Two versions: 2nd publ. in 1832
451	451				Prometheus, D 451	Hervor aus Buschen und Baumen	17/6/1816	Text by Draexler von Carin; Lost; Cantata for soprano, bass, choir and orchestra
452; 961	452	48 (1825) (1829)	XIII, 1 No. 4	I, 2	Mass No. 4	C major Kyrie – Gloria – Credo – Sanctus & Benedictus – Agnus Dei	Jun. 1816– Oct. 1828	Text: Mass ordinary (other settings: D 24E, 31, 45, 49, 56, 66, 105, 167, 324, 678, 755 and 950); For satbSATB and orchestra; 2nd setting of "Benedictus", publ. in 1829, was D 961
453	453			I, 5 Anh.	Requiem	C minor Introitus – Kyrie	July 1816	Fragment; For SATB and orchestra
454	454	(1872)	XX, 4 No. 239	IV, 10	Grablied auf einen Soldaten	Zieh hin, du braver Krieger du!	July 1816	Text by Schubart
455	455	(1887)	XX, 4 No. 240	IV, 10	Freude der Kinderjahre	Freude, die im frühen Lenze	July 1816	Text by Köpken
456	456	(1887)	XX, 4 No. 241	IV, 10	Das Heimweh, D 456	Oft in einsam stillen Stunden	July 1816	Text by Hell
457	457	44 (1827)	XX, 4 No. 237	IV, 3	An die untergehende Sonne	Sonne, du sinkst	July 1816– May 1817	Text by Kosegarten
458	458	(1872)	XX, 4 No. 242	IV, 10	Aus Diego Manazares: Ilmerine	Wo irrst du durch einsame Schatten	30/07/1816	Text by Schlechta from Diego Manazares
459 (Nos. 1–2)	459	(1843)	XI No. 14	VII/2, 1 No. 3	Piano Sonata, D 459	E major	August; 1816	Allegro moderato – Scherzo; With D 459A a.k.a. Fünf Klavierstücke
459 (Nos. 3–5)	459A	(1843)	XI No. 14	VII/2, 4	Three piano pieces, D 459A	C major (No. 1); A major (No. 2); E major (No. 3)	1816?	Adagio – Scherzo – Allegro patetico; With D 459 a.k.a. Fünf Klavierstücke
460	460	(1888)	XIV No. 7	I, 9 No. 6	Tantum ergo, D 460	C major	August; 1816	Text by Aquinas (other settings: D 461, 730, 739, 750, 962 and Anh. I/17); For sSATB and orchestra
461	461	(1935)		I, 9 No. 7	Tantum ergo, D 461	C major	August; 1816	Text by Aquinas (other settings: D 460, 730, 739, 750, 962 and Anh. I/17); For satbSATB and orchestra
462	462	(1895)	XX, 4 No. 244	IV, 10	An Chloen, D 462	Bei der Liebe reinsten Flammen	August; 1816	Text by Jacobi
463	463	(1895)	XX, 4 No. 245	IV, 10	Hochzeit-Lied	Will singen euch im alten Ton	August; 1816	Text by Jacobi
464	464	(1895)	XX, 4 No. 246	IV, 10	In der Mitternacht	Todesstille deckt das Tal	August; 1816	Text by Jacobi
465	465	(1885)	XX, 4 No. 247	IV, 10	Trauer der Liebe	Wo die Taub' in stillen Buchen	August; 1816	Text by Jacobi; Two versions: 1st, in AGA, publ. 1885
466	466	(1872)	XX, 4 No. 248	IV, 10	Die Perle	Es ging ein Mann zur Frühlingszeit	August; 1816	Text by Jacobi
467	467	(1885)	XX, 10; No. 593	IV, 10	Pflicht und Liebe	Du, der ewig um mich trauert	August; 1816	Text by Gotter; Fragment
468	468	(1895)	XX, 4 No. 243	IV, 10	An den Mond, D 468	Was schauest du so hell	07/08/1816	Text by Hölty
469	469	(1897)	XXII, 11 Nos. 394– 395	IV, 3	Mignon, D 469	So laßt mich scheinen, bis ich werde	September; 1816	Text by Goethe, from Wilhelm Meister's Apprenticeship (other settings: D 727 and 877 No. 3); Two versions, both fragments
470; 601	470	(1886)	II No. 3	V, 5 VI, 4 Anh. No. 4	Overture, D 470	B♭ major	September; 1816	For orchestra; Overture to D 472(?); Fragment for string quartet was D 601
471	471	(1890) (1897)	VI No. 1 XXII, 1 p. 84	VI, 6 No. 1 & Anh. No. 2	String Trio, D 471	B♭ major	September; 1816	Allegro (AGA VI) – Andante sostenuto (fragment, in AGA XXII)
472	472	128p (1830) (1892)	XVII; No. 2	III, 1	Kantate zu Ehren von Josef Spendou	Da liegt er, starr – Gottes Bild ist Furst und Staat – Ein Punkt nur ist der Mensch – Die Sonne sticht	September; 1816	Text by Hoheisel; For sstbSSATB and orchestra (piano reduction in 1st ed.); Overture: D 470(?); Recitative, aria with choir – Recitative, duet – Recitative, choir – Recitative, quartet with choir
473	473	(1833) (1895)	XX, 4 No. 249	IV, 10	Liedesend	Auf seinem gold'nen Throne	September; 1816	Text by Mayrhofer; Two versions: 2nd in 1st ed.
474	474	(1832) (1895)	XX, 4 No. 250	IV, 10	Lied des Orpheus, als er in die Hölle ging	Wälze dich hinweg	September; 1816	Text by Jacobi; Two versions: 2nd in 1st ed.
475	475	(1885)	XX, 4 No. 251	IV, 11	Abschied: Nach einer Wallfahrts-Arie bearbeitet	Über die Berge zieht ihr fort	September; 1816	Text by Jacobi
476	476	(1872)	XX, 4 No. 252	IV, 11	Rückweg	Zum Donaustrom, zur Kaiserstadt	September; 1816	Text by Mayrhofer
477	477	(1895)	XX, 4 No. 253	IV, 11	Alte Liebe rostet nie	Alte Liebe rostet nie	September; 1816	Text by Mayrhofer
478; 479; 480	478	12 (1822) (1895)	XX, 4 Nos. 254, 256– 258, 255	IV, 1a & b No. 10 & Anh. Nos. 6–7	Gesänge des Harfners aus "Wilhelm Meister"	1. Wer sich der Einsamkeit ergibt – 2. Wer nie sein Brot mit Tränen aß – 3. An die Türen will ich schleichen	September; 1816–1822	Text by Goethe, from Wilhelm Meister's Apprenticeship (other setting of No. 1: D 325); No. 2 was D 480; No. 3 was D 479; Two versions: 1st, Harfenspieler I/III/II, composed 1816, publ. 1895, has two variants of No. 2 – 2nd, 1822, is Op. 12
481	481	(1895)	XX, 4 No. 259	IV, 3	Sehnsucht, D 481	Nur wer die Sehnsucht kennt	September; 1816	Text by Goethe, from Wilhelm Meister's Apprenticeship (other settings: D 310, 359, 656 and 877 Nos. 1 & 4)
482	482	(1895)	XX, 4 No. 264	IV, 11	Der Sänger am Felsen	Klage, meine Flöte, klage	September; 1816	Text by Pichler, from Idyllen
483	483	(1895)	XX, 4 No. 265	IV, 11	Lied, D 483	Ferne von der großen Stadt	September; 1816	Text by Pichler, from Idyllen
484	484	(1895)	XX, 10; No. 594	IV, 11	Gesang der Geister über den Wassern, D 484	Des Menschen Seele gleicht dem Wasser	September; 1816	Text by Goethe (other settings: D 538, 705 and 714); Fragment
485	485	(1885)	I, 2 No. 5	V, 2 No. 5	Symphony No. 5	B♭ major	Sept.–3 Oct. 1816	Allegro – Andante con moto – Minuet – Allegro vivace
486	486	(1888)	XIV No. 11	I, 9 No. 4	Magnificat	Magnificat anima mea Dominum; C major	15/09/1815	Text by Luke (Vulgate translation); For satbSATB and orchestra
487	487	(1865)	VII, 1 No. 2	V, 7 No. 4 VI, 7 No. 5	Adagio e Rondo concertante	F major	October 1816	For piano quartet
488	488	(1888)	XIV No. 10	I, 8	Auguste jam coelestium	Auguste jam coelestium	October 1816	Duet for st and orchestra
489; 493	489	4,1 (1821) (1895) (1970)	XX, 4 No. 266	IV, 1a & b No. 5	Der Wanderer, D 489, a.k.a. Der Unglückliche	Ich komme vom Gebirge her	October 1816	Text by Schmidt von Lübeck; Three versions: 1st and 3rd in AGA 1895 – 2nd and 3rd were D 493 (2nd publ. 1970 – 3rd is Op. 4 No. 1); Music partly reappears in D 760
490	490	(1895)	XX, 4 No. 267	IV, 11	Der Hirt	Du Turm! zu meinem Leide	October 1816	Text by Mayrhofer
491	491	(1887)	XX, 4 No. 269	IV, 11	Geheimnis: An F. Schubert	Sag an, wer lehrt dich Lieder	October 1816	Text by Mayrhofer
492	492	(1849)	XX, 4 No. 270	III, 3 No. 15; IV, 11	Zum Punsche, D 492	Woget brausend, Harmonien	October 1816	Text by Mayrhofer
493	489							See D 489
494	494	(1871)	XVI; No. 32	III, 4 No. 41	Der Geistertanz, D 494	Die bretterne Kammer der Toten erbebt	November 1816	Text by Matthisson (other settings: D 15, 15A and 116); For ttbbb
495	495	(1868)	XX, 4 No. 271	IV, 11	Abendlied der Fürstin	Der Abend rötet nun das Tal	November 1816	Text by Mayrhofer
496	496	(1885)	XX, 4 No. 274	IV, 11	Bei dem Grabe meines Vaters	Friede sei um diesen Grabstein her!	November 1816	Text by Claudius
140	496A	(1968)		IV, 7 No. 22	Klage um Ali Bey, D 496A	Laßt mich! laßt mich! ich will klagen	November 1816	Text by Claudius (other setting: D 140)
497	497	98,1 (1829)	XX, 4 No. 276	IV, 5	An die Nachtigall, D 497	Er liegt und schläft	November 1816	Text by Claudius
498	498	98,2 (1829)	XX, 4 No. 277	IV, 5	Wiegenlied, D 498	Schlafe, schlafe, holder süßer Knabe	November 1816	
499	499	(1885)	XX, 4 No. 278	IV, 11	Abendlied, D 499	Der Mond ist aufgegangen	November 1816	Text by Claudius
500	500	(1895)	XX, 4 No. 279	IV, 11	Phidile	Ich war erst sechzehn Sommer alt	November 1816	Text by Claudius
501	501	(1895)	XX, 4 No. 281	IV, 11	Zufriedenheit, D 501	Ich bin vergnugt	November 1816	Text by Claudius (other setting: D 362); Two versions: 1st in AGA
502	502	(1872)	XX, 4 No. 282	IV, 11	Herbstlied, D 502	Bunt sind schon die Wälder	November 1816	Text by Salis-Seewis
503	503			IV, 11	Mailied, D 503	Grüner wird die Au	November 1816	Text by Hölty (other settings: D 129 and 199)
504	504	6,3 (1821) (1970)	XX, 4 No. 275	IV, 1a & b No. 8	Am Grabe Anselmos	Daß ich dich verloren habe	4/11/1816	Text by Claudius; Two versions: 1st, in AGA, is Op. 6 No. 3
505	505	145p,1 (1848) (1897)	XI No. 5 XXII, 4 No. 5	VII/2, 2	Adagio, D 505	D♭ major	September; 1818?	For piano; 2nd movement of D 625?; Abridged variant in E major, in AGA XXI, is Op. posth. 145 No. 1
506	506	145p,2 (1848)	XI No. 5	VII/2, 4	Rondo, D 506	E major	June 1817?	For piano; 4th movement of D 566?
507	507	(1895)	XX, 4 No. 283	IV, 11	Skolie, D 507	Mädchen entsiegelten	December 1816	Text by Matthisson
508	508	(1845)	XX, 4 No. 284	IV, 11	Lebenslied, D 508	Kommen und Scheiden	December 1816	Text by Matthisson (other settings: D Anh. I, 23, and possibly 425)
509	509	(1872)	XX, 4 No. 285	IV, 11	Leiden der Trennung	Vom Meere trennt sich die Welle	December 1816	Text by Metastasio, from Artaserse III, 1, "L'onda dal mar divisa", transl. by Collin, H. J.; Two versions: 1st is a fragment – 2nd in AGA
510	510	(1895)	XX, 10; No. 573	IV, 11	Vedi quanto adoro	Vedi quanto adoro	December 1816	Text by Metastasio, from Didone abbandonata II, 4; Aria for soprano and piano; Clean copy and three sketches; Last extant autograph with corrections by Salieri
511–598							1817	Up ↑
511	511			VII/2, 6	Écossaise, D 511	E♭ major	c. 1817	For piano
513	513	(1891)	XVI; No. 19	III, 3 Anh. II No. 4	La pastorella al prato, D 513	La pastorella al prato	1817?	Text by Goldoni, from Il filosofo di campagna II, 16 (other setting: D 528); For ttbb and piano
	513A			IV, 11	Nur wer die Liebe kennt	Nur wer die Liebe kennt	1817?	Text by Werner; Sketch
514	514	7,1 (1823)	XX, 5 No. 300	IV, 1a	Die abgeblühte Linde	Wirst du halten, was du schwurst	1817?	Text by Széchényi
515	515	7,2 (1823)	XX, 5 No. 301	IV, 1a	Der Flug der Zeit	Es floh die Zeit im Wirbelfluge	1817?	Text by Széchényi
516	516	8,2 (1822)	XX, 6 No. 386	IV, 1a & Anh. No. 5	Sehnsucht, D 516	Der Lerche wolkennahe Lieder	1816?	Text by Mayrhofer
517	517	13,1 (1822) (1972)	XX, 5 No. 293	IV, 1a	Der Schäfer und der Reiter	Ein Schäfer saß im Grünen	April 1817	Text by Motte Fouqué; Two versions: 2nd, in AGA, is Op. 13 No. 1
518	518	(1824)	XX, 5 No. 326	IV, 5	An den Tod	Tod, du Schrecken der Natur	1816 or 1817	Text by Schubart; For b and piano
519	519	173p,5 (1867)	XX, 5 No. 299	IV, 11	Die Blumensprache	Es deuten die Blumen des Herzens Gefühle	1817?	Text by Platner (?)
520	520	(1850) (1895)	XX, 5 No. 289	IV, 11	Frohsinn	Ich bin von lockerem Schlage	January; 1817	Text by Castelli; Two versions: 1st in AGA
521	521	(1830) (1895)	XX, 5 No. 290	III, 3 No. 16; Anh. I No. 6	Jagdlied	Trarah! Trarah! Wir kehren daheim	January; 1817	Text by Werner, from Wanda, Königin der Sarmaten I (other text in 1830 ed.); For voice (or: unison choir) and piano
522	522	(1895)	XX, 5 No. 291	IV, 11	Die Liebe, D 522	Wo weht der Liebe hoher Geist?	January; 1817	Text by Leon
523	523	(1885)	XX, 5 No. 292	IV, 11	Trost, D 523	Nimmer lange weil' ich hier	January; 1817	
524	524	13,3 (1822) (1895) (1970)	XX, 5 No. 295	IV, 1a & b No. 12	Der Alpenjäger, D 524	Auf hohem Bergesrücken	January; 1817	Text by Mayrhofer; Three versions: 2nd, not in AGA, is for b and piano – 3rd is Op. 13 No. 3
525	525	21,3 (1823) (1970)	XX, 5 No. 296	IV, 1a & b No. 18	Wie Ulfru fischt	Der Angel zuckt, die Rute bebt	January; 1817	Text by Mayrhofer; For b and piano; Two versions: 2nd, in AGA, is Op. 21 No. 3
526	526	(1832)	XX, 5 No. 297	IV, 11	Fahrt zum Hades	Der Nachen dröhnt	January; 1817	Text by Mayrhofer; For b and piano
527	527	24,2 (1823) (1975)	XX, 5 No. 298	IV, 2a & b No. 2	Schlaflied a.k.a. Abendlied a.k.a. Schlummerlied	Es mahnt der Wald	January; 1817	Text by Mayrhofer; Two versions: 2nd, in AGA, is Op. 24 No. 2
528	528	(1872)	XX, 10; No. 574	IV, 11	La pastorella al prato, D 528	La pastorella al prato	January; 1817	Text by Goldoni, from Il filosofo di campagna II, 16 (other setting: D 513); Arietta for soprano and piano
529	529	(1871) (1897)	XII; No. 11; XXI, 3 No. 30	VII/2, 6	Eight Écossaises, D 529	Various keys	February; 1817	For piano; Nos. 1–3, 6 and 8 publ. 1871
530	530	109p,3 (1829)	XX, 4 No. 273	IV, 11	An eine Quelle	Du kleine grünumwachs'ne Quelle	February; 1817	Text by Claudius
531	531	7,3 (1823)	XX, 5 No. 302	IV, 1a	Der Tod und das Mädchen	Vorüber, ach vorüber	February; 1817	Text by Claudius; Music partly reappears in D 810
532	532	(1895)	XX, 5 No. 303	IV, 11	Das Lied vom Reifen	Seht meine lieben Bäume an	February; 1817	Text by Claudius; Fragment (completed in AGA)
533	533	(1876) (1895)	XX, 5 No. 304	IV, 11	Täglich zu singen	Ich danke Gott und freue mich	February; 1817	Text by Claudius; 1876 publ. is piano reduction
534	534	(1830)	XX, 5 No. 305	IV, 11	Die Nacht, D 534	Die Nacht ist dumpfig und finster	February; 1817	Text by Macpherson (Ossian), from Domhnull mac Fhionnlaidh, transl. by E. Baron de Harold
535	535	(1853) (1895)	XX, 10; No. 585	III, 1	Lied, D 535	Brüder, schrecklich brennt die Träne	February; 1817	For s and small orchestra; 1853 ed. is arrangement
536	536	21,2 (1823) (1970)	XX, 5 No. 318	IV, 1a & b No. 17	Der Schiffer, D 536	Im winde, im Sturme	1817?	Text by Mayrhofer; For b and piano; Two versions: 2nd, in AGA, is Op. 21 No. 2
537	537	164p (1852)	X No. 6	VII/2, 1 No. 4	Piano Sonata, D 537	A minor	March 1817	Allegro ma non troppo – Allegretto quasi Andantino – Allegro vivace
538	538	(1891)	XVI; No. 33	III, 4 No. 42	Gesang der Geister über den Wassern, D 538	Des Menschen Seele gleicht dem Wasser	March 1817	Text by Goethe (other settings: D 484, 705 and 714); For ttbb
539	539	8,4 (1822)	XX, 5 No. 306	IV, 1a	Am Strome	Ist mir's doch, als sei mein Leben	March 1817	Text by Mayrhofer
540	540	(1831)	XX, 5 No. 307	IV, 11	Philoktet	Da sitz' ich ohne Bogen	March 1817	Text by Mayrhofer
541	541	6,1 (1821)	XX, 5 No. 308	IV, 1a	Memnon	Den Tag hindurch nur einmal mag ich sprechen	March 1817	Text by Mayrhofer
542	542	6,2 (1821)	XX, 5 No. 309	IV, 1a	Antigone und Oedip	Ihr hohen Himmlischen	March 1817	Text by Mayrhofer
543	543	92,2 (1828) (1895)	XX, 5 No. 310	IV, 5	Auf dem See	Und frische Nahrung	March 1817	Text by Goethe; Two versions: 2nd is Op. 92 No. 2
544	544	19,3 (1825)	XX, 5 No. 311	IV, 1a	Ganymed	Wie im Morgenglanze	March 1817	Text by Goethe
545	545	(1872) (1895)	XX, 5 No. 312	IV, 11	Der Jüngling und der Tod	Die Sonne sinkt, o könnt ich	March 1817	Text by Spaun; Two versions: 1st is duet – 2nd publ. 1872
546	546	101p,3 (1827)	XX, 5 No. 313	IV, 5	Trost im Liede	Braust des Unglücks Sturm empor	March 1817	Text by Schober; Publ. as Op. posth. 101 No. 3 in 1828
547	547	88,4 (1827) (1895)	XX, 5 No. 314	IV, 4	An die Musik	Du holde Kunst	March 1817	Text by Schober; Two versions: 2nd is Op. 88 No. 4
548	548	(1831)	XX, 6 No. 382	IV, 11	Orest auf Tauris	Ist dies Tauris	March 1817	Text by Mayrhofer
549	549	(1895)	XX, 10; No. 595	IV, 13	Mahomets Gesang, D 549	Seht den Felsenquell	March 1817	Text by Goethe (other setting: D 721); Fragment
550	550	32 (1820) (1895) (1975)	XX, 5 No. 327	IV, 2a & b No. 3	Die Forelle	In einem Bächlein helle	late 1816– October 1821	Text by Schubart; Five versions: 1st–4th in AGA – 4th publ. as Op. 32 in 1827; Music partly reappears in D 667
551	551	(1831)	XX, 5 No. 315	IV, 11	Pax vobiscum	Der Friede sei mit euch!	April 1817	Text by Schober
552	552	20,3 (1823) (1970)	XX, 5 No. 316	IV, 1a & b No. 16	Hänflings Liebeswerbung	Ahidi! ich liebe	April 1817	Text by Kind; Two versions: 2nd, in AGA, is Op. 20 No. 3; Music related to D 972 No. 3
553	553	21,1 (1823)	XX, 5 No. 317	IV, 1a	Auf der Donau	Auf der Wellen Spiegel	April 1817	Text by Mayrhofer; For b and piano
554	554	(1895)	XX, 5 No. 319	IV, 11	Uraniens Flucht	Laßt uns, ihr Himmlischen, ein Fest begehen!	April 1817	Text by Mayrhofer
555	555	(1934)		IV, 11	Liedentwurf, D 555	A minor	May 1817?	Sketch without text
556	556	(1886)	II No. 4	V, 5	Overture, D 556	D major	May 1817	For orchestra
557	557	(1888)	X No. 3	VII/2, 1 No. 5	Piano Sonata, D 557	A♭ major	May 1817	Allegro moderato – Andante – Allegro
558	558	(1887)	XX, 3 No. 120	IV, 11	Liebhaber in allen Gestalten	Ich wollt', ich wär' ein Fisch	May 1817	Text by Goethe
559	559	(1885)	XX, 3 No. 121	IV, 11	Schweizerlied	Uf'm Bergli bin i g'sässe	May 1817	Text by Goethe
560	560	(1850)	XX, 3 No. 122	IV, 11	Der Goldschmiedsgesell	Es ist doch meine Nachbarin	May 1817	Text by Goethe
561	561	(1872)	XX, 5 No. 320	IV, 11	Nach einem Gewitter	Auf den Blumen	May 1817	Text by Mayrhofer
562	562	(1895)	XX, 5 No. 321	IV, 11	Fischerlied, D 562	Das Fischergewerbe gibt rüstigen Mut	May 1817	Text by Salis-Seewis (other settings: D 351 and 364)
563	563	(1887)	XX, 5 No. 322	IV, 11	Die Einsiedelei, D 563	Es rieselt klar und wehend ein Quell	May 1817	Text by Salis-Seewis (other settings: D 337 and 393)
564	564	(1838)	XX, 10; No. 596	IV, 11	Gretchen im Zwinger a.k.a. Gretchens Bitte	Ach neige, du Schmerzensreiche	May 1817	Text by Goethe, from Faust I, 18; Fragment
565	565	(1876)	XX, 5 No. 324	IV, 11	Der Strom	Mein Leben wälzt sich murrend fort	June 1817?	For b and piano
566	566	(1888) (1907) (1928- 29)	X No. 4	VII/2, 1 No. 6 & Anh. No. 3	Piano Sonata, D 566	E minor	June 1817	Moderato (in AGA) – Allegretto (publ. 1907) – Scherzo (publ. 1928/29); D 506 4th movement?
567; 568	568	122p (1829) (1897)	X No. 7 XXI, 2 No. 9	VII/2, 1 No. 7 & Anh. Nos. 4–6	Piano Sonata in D♭ major, D 568; Piano Sonata in E♭ major, D 568	D♭ major; E♭ major	June 1817	Two versions: 1st, in D♭ major, composed June 1817 – 2nd, in E♭ major, is Op. posth. 122; Allegro moderato – Andante molto – Minuet (2nd version only, D 593 No. 2 for 1st version?) – Allegro moderato (2nd version), Allegretto (fragment, 1st version)
569	569	(1895)	XX, 5 No. 323	III, 3 No. 17	Das Grab, D 569	Das Grab ist tief und stille	June 1817	Text by Salis-Seewis (other settings: D 329A, 330, 377 and 643A); For unison men's choir and piano
570	570	(1897)	XXI, 3 No. 20	VII/2, 1 No. 8 Anh. Nos. 8–9	Scherzo and Allegro	D major (scherzo); F♯ minor (allegro)	July 1817?	For piano; Allegro is fragment; Last movements of D 571?
571	571	(1897)	XXI, 2 No. 10	VII/2, 1 Anh. No. 7	Piano Sonata, D 571	F♯ minor	July 1817	Allegro moderato; Fragment; Completed by (D 604 and) 570?
572	572	(1872)	XVI; No. 34	III, 4 No. 43	Lied im Freien, D 572	Wie schön ist's im Freien	July 1817	Text by Salis-Seewis (other setting: D Anh. I/19; For ttbb
573	573	98,3 (1829)	XX, 5 No. 325	IV, 5	Iphigenia	Blüht denn hier an Tauris Strande	July 1817	Text by Mayrhofer
574	574	162p (1851)	VIII; No. 6	VI, 8 No. 4	Violin Sonata, D 574, a.k.a. (Grand) Duo	A major	August 1817	Allegro moderato – Scherzo – Andantino – Allegro vivace
575	575	147p (1846)	X No. 5	VII/2, 1 No. 9 & Anh. No. 10	Piano Sonata, D 575	B major	August 1817	Allegro ma non troppo – Andante – Scherzo – Allegro giusto
576	576	(1867)	XI No. 7	VII/2, 4	13 Variations on a theme by Anselm Hüttenbrenner	A minor	August 1817	For piano
577	577	(1895)	XX, 10; No. 597	IV, 10	Entzückung an Laura, D 577	Laura, über diese Welt	August 1817	Text by Schiller (other setting: D 390); Two fragments of a sketch
578	578	(1838)	XX, 10; No. 586	IV, 11	Abschied, D 578	Lebe wohl! Du lieber Freund!	24/08/1817	Text by Schubert
579	579	(1872) (1897)	XX, 5 No. 335; XXII, 11; No. 335	IV, 11	Der Knabe in der Wiege	Er schläft so süß	Autumn; 1817	Text by Ottenwalt; Two versions: 1st publ. 1872 – 2nd is fragment
989	579A	(1970)		IV, 11	Vollendung	Wenn ich einst das Ziel errungen habe	Sept. or Oct. 1817?	Text by Matthisson
989A	579B	(1970)		IV, 11	Die Erde	Wenn sanft entzückt mein Auge sieht	Sept. or Oct. 1817?	Text by Matthisson
580	580	(1928)		V, 7 No. 3	Polonaise, D 580	B♭ major	September; 1817	For violin and orchestra
581	581	(1897)	XXI, 1 No. 5	VI, 6 No. 2–3	String Trio, D 581	B♭ major	September; 1817	Allegro moderato – Andante – Minuet – Rondo
583	583	24,1 (1823)	XX, 5 No. 328	IV, 2a	Gruppe aus dem Tartarus, D 583	Horch, wie Murmeln des empörten Meeres	September; 1817	Text by Schiller (other settings: D 65 and 396)
584	584	(1830)	XX, 5 No. 329	IV, 11	Elysium	Vorüber die stöhnende Klage!	September; 1817	Text by Schiller (settings of separate stanzas: D 51, 53, 54, 57, 58 and 60)
585	585	(1833)	XX, 5 No. 330	IV, 11	Atys	Der Knabe seufzt übers grüne Meer	September; 1817	Text by Mayrhofer
586	586	8,3 (1818)	XX, 5 No. 331	IV, 1a	Erlafsee	Mir ist so wohl, so weh'	September; 1817	Text by Mayrhofer; Publ. as Op. 8 No. 3 in 1822
587; 245	587	(1885) (1895)	XX, 3 No. 107	IV, 11	An den Frühling, D 587	Willkommen, schöner Jüngling!	October; 1817	Text by Schiller (other settings: D 283 and 338); Two versions: 1st publ. 1885 – 2nd was D 245
588	588	37,2 (1825) (1897) (1975)	XX, 5 No. 332; XXII, 11; No. 332	IV, 2a & b No. 7	Der Alpenjäger, D 588	Willst du nicht das Lämmlein hüten?	October; 1817	Text by Schiller; Two versions: 1st incomplete in AGA – 2nd is Op. 37 No. 2
589	589	(1885)	I, 2 No. 6	V, 2 No. 6	Symphony No. 6 Little C major	C major	Oct. 1817– Feb. 1818	Adagio, Allegro – Andante – Scherzo – Allegro moderato
590	590	(1886)	II No. 5	V, 5	Overture in the Italian Style, D 590	D major	November; 1817	For orchestra; Piano duet arrangement: D 592; Music partly reappears in D 644
591	591	170p (1865)	II No. 6	V, 5	Overture in the Italian Style, D 591	C major	November; 1817	For orchestra; Piano duet arrangement: D 597
592	592	(1872)	IX, 2 No. 10	VII/1, 5 No. 1	Overture in the Italian Style, D 592	D major	December; 1817	For piano duet; Arrangement of D 590
593	593	(1871)	XI No. 15	VII/2, 4	Two Scherzi	Various keys	November; 1817	For piano; No. 2 related to D 568
594	594	110p (1829)	XX, 5 No. 333	IV, 11	Der Kampf	Nein, länger werd' ich diesen Kampf nicht kämpfen	November; 1817	Text by Schiller; For b and piano
595	595	88,2 (1827) (1895)	XX, 5 No. 334	IV, 4	Thekla: Eine Geisterstimme, D 595	Wo ich sei, und wo mich hingewendet	November; 1817	Text by Schiller (other setting: D 73); Two versions: 2nd is Op. 88 No. 2
596	596	(1895)	XX, 10; No. 598	IV, 11	Lied eines Kindes	Lauter Freude fühl' ich	November; 1817	Fragment
597	597	(1872)	IX, 2 No. 9	VII/1, 5 No. 2	Overture in the Italian Style, D 597	C major	Nov. or Dec. 1817	For piano duet; Arrangement of D 591
597A	597A				Variations	A major	December; 1817	Lost sketch for violin
598; 641	598	11,1 (1822) (1891)	XVI; No. 4 & No. 46	III, 3 No. 24; Anh. IV No. 4	Das Dörfchen	Ich rühme mir mein Dörfchen hier	December; 1817	Text by Bürger; For ttbb and piano; Two versions: 1st is sketch without piano – 2nd, Op. 11 No. 1, was D 641
599–632							1818	Up ↑
599	599	75 (1827)	IX, 3 No. 26	VII/1, 4	Four Polonaises	Various keys	July 1818	For piano duet
600	600	(1897)	XXI, 3 No. 27	VII/2, 4	Minuet, D 600	C♯ minor	early 1814?	For piano; May combine with D 610 and/or D 613
601	470							See D 470
602	602	27 (1824)	IX, 1 No. 1	VII/1, 4	Trois Marches héroiques	Various keys	1818 or 1824	For piano duet
604	604	(1888)	XI No. 10	VII/2, 4	Piano piece, D 604, a.k.a. Andante	A major	1816 or 1817	2nd movement of D 571?
605	605	(1897)	XXI, 3 No. 15	VII/2, 4 Anh.	Fantasy, D 605	C major	1821–1823	For piano; Fragment
	605A	(1969)		VII/2, 4	Fantasy, D 605A, a.k.a. Grazer Fantasy	C major	1818?	For piano
606	606	(1840)	XI No. 16	VII/2, 4	March, D 606	E major	1818?	For piano
607	607			I, 8	Evangelium Johannis 6, Vers 55–58	In der Zeit sprach der Herr Jesus	1818	Text by John (Luther translation); For voice and figured bass
608	608	138p (1834)	IX, 2 No. 14	VII/1, 1 No. 4 & Anh. No. 4	Rondo, D 608, "Notre amitié est invariable"	D major	January; 1818	For piano duet; Two versions: 2nd, in AGA, is Op. posth. 138
609; 665	609	(1872)	XVII; No. 13	III, 2a No. 10	Die Geselligkeit a.k.a. Lebenslust	Wer Lebenslust fühlet	January; 1818	Text by Unger; For satb and piano; 2nd part of 1st stanza, "im traulichen Kreise", was D 665
610	610	(1889)	XII; No. 31	VII/2, 6	Trio, D 610	E major	February; 1818	For piano; May belong to D 600, and together with that minuet to D 613
611	611	(1850)	XX, 5 No. 336	IV, 12	Auf der Riesenkoppe	Hoch auf dem Gipfel deiner Gebirge	March 1818	Text by Körner
612	612	(1869)	XI No. 11	VII/2, 4	Adagio, D 612	E major	April 1818	For piano; 2nd movement of D 613?
613	613	(1897)	XXI, 2 No. 11	VII/2, 2	Piano Sonata, D 613	C major	April 1818	Moderato – [?]; Fragments; D 612 and 600/610 may constitute its other movements
614	614	(1832)	XX, 5 No. 337	IV, 12	An den Mond in einer Herbstnacht	Freundlich ist dein Antlitz	April 1818	Text by Schreiber
615	615			V, 6 No. 9	Symphony, D 615	D major	May 1818	Adagio, Allegro moderato – [?]; Sketches
616	616	(1830)	XX, 5 No. 338	IV, 12	Grablied für die Mutter	Hauche milder, Abendluft	June 1818	
617	617	30 (1823)	IX, 2 No. 11	VII/1, 1 No. 5	Sonata, D 617	B♭ major	Summer– Autumn; 1818(?)	For piano duet; Allegro moderato – Andante con moto – Allegretto
618	618	(1909)		VII/1, 4	German Dance with Two Trios and Two Ländler	G major (Deutscher/Trios); E major (Ländler)	Summer– Autumn; 1818	For piano duet
618A	618A	(1972)		VII/1, 4	Polonaise, D 618A	B♭ major	July 1818	For piano duet; Sketch
619	619	(1892)	XIX; No. 36	III, 2b No. 22; VIII, 2 No. 9	Sing-Übungen (vocal exercises)		July 1818	For two voices and figured bass
620	620	(1840)	XX, 5 No. 339	IV, 12	Einsamkeit, D 620	Gib mir die Fülle der Einsamkeit!	July 1818	Text by Mayrhofer
621	621	(1826)		I, 6 Anh.	Deutsches Requiem (German Requiem) a.k.a. Deutsche Trauermesse	G minor Bei des Entschlafnen Trauerbahre	August 1818	Text by Schmid; Only known in Ferd. Schubert's arrangements; Publ. 1826 for satbSATB and organ
622	622	(1833)	XX, 5 No. 340	IV, 12	Der Blumenbrief	Euch Blümlein will ich senden	August 1818	Text by Schreiber
623	623	(1831)	XX, 5 No. 341	IV, 12	Das Marienbild	Sei gegrüßt, du Frau der Huld	August 1818	Text by Schreiber
624	624	10 (1822)	IX, 2 No. 15	VII/1, 1 No. 6 & Anh. Nos. 5–6	Eight Variations on a French Song (i.e. Le bon Chevalier)	E minor	September; 1818	Theme after Hortense de Beauharnais; For piano duet
625	625	(1897)	XXI, 2 No. 12	VII/2, 2 No. 10	Piano Sonata, D 625	F minor	September; 1818	Allegro (fragment) – Scherzo – Allegro (fragment); D 505 may be its 2nd movement
626	626	(1842)	XX, 5 No. 343	IV, 12	Blondel zu Marien	In düstrer Nacht	September; 1818	
627	627	173p,6 (1867)	XX, 5 No. 344	IV, 12	Das Abendrot, D 627	Du heilig, glühend Abendrot!	November; 1818	Text by Schreiber; For b and piano
628	628	(1895)	XX, 5 No. 345	IV, 12	Sonett I	Apollo, lebet noch dein hold Verlangen	November; 1818	Text by Petrarch, transl. by Schlegel, A. W.
629	629	(1895)	XX, 5 No. 346	IV, 12	Sonett II	Allein, nachdenklich, wie gelähmt vom Krampfe	November; 1818	Text by Petrarch, transl. by Schlegel, A. W.
630	630	(1895)	XX, 5 No. 347	IV, 12	Sonett III	Nunmehr, da Himmel, Erde schweigt	November; 1818	Text by Petrarch, transl. by Gries
631	631	(1885)	XX, 5 No. 348	IV, 12	Blanka a.k.a. Das Mädchen	Wenn mich einsam Lüfte fächeln	December; 1818	Text by Schlegel, F.
632	632	(1831)	XX, 5 No. 349	IV, 12	Vom Mitleiden Mariä	Als bei dem Kreuz Maria stand	December; 1818	Text by Schlegel, F.
633–678							1819	Up ↑
633	633	57,1 (1826)	XX, 3 No. 179	IV, 3	Der Schmetterling	Wie soll ich nicht tanzen	1819–1823?	Text by Schlegel, F., from Abendröte I, 7
634	634	57,2 (1826)	XX, 3 No. 180	IV, 3	Die Berge	Sieht uns der Blick gehoben	1819–1823?	Text by Schlegel, F., from Abendröte I, 1
635	635	(1900) (1906– 1907)		III, 4 No. 44	Leise, leise laßt uns singen, later also: Ruhe, and: (Nächtliches) Ständchen	Leise, leise laßt uns singen, schlummre sanft (later also: Leise, leise laßt uns singen, still schon sieht der Mond)	c. 1819	For ttbb; later text versions, from 1900, by Robert Graf and Anton Weiß
636	636	39 (1826) (1895) (1975)	XX, 6 No. 357	IV, 2a & b No. 9	Sehnsucht, D 636	Ach, aus dieses Tales Gründen	early 1821?	Text by Schiller (other setting: D 52); Three versions: 1st not in AGA – 3rd is Op. 39
637	637	87,2 (1827)	XX, 6 No. 358	IV, 4	(Die) Hoffnung, D 637	Es reden und träumen die Menschen viel	c. 1819?	Text by Schiller (other setting: D 251)
638	638	87,3 (1827) (1895)	XX, 6 No. 359	IV, 4	Der Jüngling am Bache, D 638	An der Quelle saß der Knabe	April 1819	Text by Schiller (other settings: D 30 and 192); Two versions: 2nd is Op. 87 No. 3
639; 949	639	(1820) (1832)	XX, 9 No. 553	IV, 5	Widerschein	Fischer harrt am Brückenbogen; Tom Lehnt harrend auf der Brücke	1820; May/Sept. 1828	Text by Schlechta; Two versions; 1st publ. 1820 – 2nd, in AGA with another text variant ("Harrt ein Fischer auf der Brücke"), was D 949
641	598							See D 598
642	642	(1937)		III, 2a No. 1	Viel tausend Sterne prangen	Viel tausend Sterne prangen	1812?	Text by Eberhard; For satb and piano
643	643	(1889)	XII; No. 21	VII/2, 6	German Dance and Écossaise	C♯ minor (German dance); D♭ major (Écossaise)	1819	For piano
	643A	(1972)		III, 2a No. 11	Das Grab, D 643A	Das Grab ist tief und stille	1819	Text by Salis-Seewis (other settings: D 329A, 330, 377 and 569); For satb
644	644	(1855) (1887) (1891) (1975)	XV, 4 No. 7	II, 4	Die Zauberharfe	(Incidental music); Was belebt die schöne Welt? (Romanze from No. 9) – Durch der Töne Zaubermacht (final choir)	Apr.–Aug. 1820	Text by Georg von Hofmann; Music for tSATB and orchestra; Three acts: Overture (reused in D 797, publ. 1855) and Nos. 1–4 – Nos. 5–9 (Romanze from No.9, not in AGA, publ. 1887 with piano reduction and 1975 in concert version) – Overture and Nos. 10–13
645	645			IV, 12	Abend, D 645	Wie ist es denn, daß trüb und schwer	early 1819	Text by Tieck; Fragment of a sketch
646	646	(1885)	XX, 6 No. 350	IV, 12	Die Gebüsche	Es wehet kühl und leise	January; 1819	Text by Schlegel, F., from Abendröte II, 9
647	647	(1872) (1889)	XV, 3 No. 5	II, 5	Die Zwillingsbrüder	(Singspiel)	Oct. 1818– 1819	For stbbbSATB and orchestra (piano reduction in 1872 edition); Overture and Nos. 1–10
648	648	(1886)	II No. 7	V, 5	Overture, D 648	E minor	February; 1819	For orchestra
649	649	65,2 (1826)	XX, 6 No. 351	IV, 3	Der Wanderer, D 649	Wie deutlich des Mondes Licht zu mir spricht	February; 1819	Text by Schlegel, F., from Abendröte II, 1; Two versions: 2nd is Op. 65 No. 2
650	650	(1831)	XX, 6 No. 352	IV, 12	Abendbilder	Still beginnt's im Hain zu tauen	February; 1819	Text by Silbert
651	651	(1831)	XX, 6 No. 353	IV, 12	Himmelsfunken	Der Odem Gottes weht	February; 1819	Text by Silbert
652	652	(1842)	XX, 6 No. 354	IV, 12	Das Mädchen, D 652	Wie so innig, möcht ich sagen	February; 1819	Text by Schlegel, F., from Abendröte II, 4; Two versions: 1st, in AGA, publ. 1842
653	653	(1842)	XX, 6 No. 355	IV, 12	Bertas Lied in der Nacht	Nacht umhüllt mit wehendem Flügel	February; 1819	Text by Grillparzer
654	654	(1842)	XX, 6 No. 356	IV, 12	An die Freunde	Im Wald, im Wald, da grabt mich ein	March 1819	Text by Mayrhofer
655	655	(1897)	XXI, 2 No. 13	VII/2, 2	Piano Sonata, D 655	C♯ minor	April 1819	Allegro; Fragment
656	656	(1867)	XVI; No. 35	III, 4 No. 45	Sehnsucht, D 656	Nur wer die Sehnsucht kennt	April 1819	Text by Goethe, from Wilhelm Meister's Apprenticeship (other settings: D 310, 359, 481 and 877 Nos. 1 & 4); For ttbbb
657	657	(1871)	XVI; No. 36	III, 4 No. 46	Ruhe, schönstes Glück der Erde	Ruhe, schönstes Glück der Erde	April 1819	For ttbb
658	658	(1895)	XX, 6 No. 364	IV, 12	Marie	Ich sehe dich in tausend Bildern	May 1819?	Text by Novalis, No. 15 from Geistliche Lieder
659	659	(1872)	XX, 6 No. 360	IV, 12	Hymn I	Wenige wissen das Geheimnis der Liebe	May 1819	Text by Novalis, No. 7 from Geistliche Lieder
660	660	(1872)	XX, 6 No. 361	IV, 12	Hymn II	Wenn ich ihn nur habe	May 1819	Text by Novalis, No. 5 from Geistliche Lieder
661	661	(1872)	XX, 6 No. 362	IV, 12	Hymn III	Wenn alle untreu werden	May 1819	Text by Novalis, No. 6 from Geistliche Lieder
662	662	(1872)	XX, 6 No. 363	IV, 12	Hymn IV	Ich sag' es jedem, daß er lebt	May 1819	Text by Novalis, No. 9 from Geistliche Lieder
663	663			IV, 12	Psalm 13 (12)	Ach Herr, wie lange willst du mein so ganz vergessen?	June 1819	Text by Mendelssohn, M., translating Psalm 13; Fragment
664	664	120p (1829)	X No. 10	VII/2, 2 No. 11	Piano Sonata, D 664	A major	Summer 1819 or 1825	Allegro moderato – Andante – Allegro
665	609							See D 609
666	666	158p (1849)	XIX; No. 3	III, 2a No. 12	Kantate zum Geburtstag des Sängers Johann Michael Vogl	Sänger, der von Herzen singet – Diese Berge sah'n dich blühen – Da saht ihr Oresten scheiden – Gott bewahr' dein teures Leben	10/08/1819	Text by Stadler, A.; For stb and piano; Publ. 1849, with different text, as Der Frühlingsmorgen
667	667	114p (1829)	VII, 1 No. 1	VI, 7 No. 6	Trout Quintet	A major	1819?	Allegro vivace – Andante – Scherzo – Theme and variations – Allegro giusto; For violin, viola, cello, double bass and piano; Reuses music of D 550
668	668	(1897)	XXI, 2 No. 6	VII/1, 5 No. 3	Overture, D 668	G minor	October; 1819	For piano duet
669	669	(1829)	XX, 6 No. 365	IV, 12	Beim Winde	Es traümen die Wolken	October; 1819	Text by Mayrhofer
670	670	165p,2 (1862)	XX, 6 No. 366	IV, 12	Die Sternennächte	In monderhellten Nächten	October; 1819	Text by Mayrhofer; Two versions: 2nd is Op. posth. 165 No. 2
671	671	(1849)	XX, 6 No. 367	IV, 12	Trost, D 671	Hörnerklänge rufen klagend	October; 1819	Text by Mayrhofer
672	672	36,2 (1825) (1975)	XX, 6 No. 368	IV, 2a & b No. 5	Nachtstück	Wenn über Berge sich der Nebel breitet	October; 1819	Text by Mayrhofer; Two versions: 2nd is Op. 36 No. 2
673	673	165p,1 (1832) (1862)	XX, 6 No. 369	IV, 12	Die Liebende schreibt	Ein Blick von deinen Augen	October; 1819	Text by Goethe; Two versions: 1st publ. in 1832 – 2nd is Op. posth. 165 No. 1
674	674	(1850)	XX, 6 No. 370	IV, 12	Prometheus, D 674	Bedecke deinen Himmel, Zeus	October; 1819	Text by Goethe; For b and piano
675	675	34 (1825)	IX, 2 No. 8	VII/1, 5 No. 4	Overture, D 675	F major	November; 1819?	For piano duet
676	676	153p (1845) (1888)	XIV No. 3	I, 8	Salve Regina, D 676, a.k.a. Drittes Offertorium	A major Salve Regina	November; 1819	Text: Salve Regina (other settings: D 27, 106, 223, 386 and 811); For s and orchestra; Shortened in 1st ed., Op. posth. 153
677	677	(1848) (1895)	XX, 6 No. 371	IV, 12	Stanza from "Die Götter Griechenlands"	Schöne Welt, wo bist du?	November; 1819	Text by Schiller; Two versions: 2nd publ. in 1848
678	678	(1875) (1887)	XIII, 2 No. 5	I, 3	Mass No. 5	A♭ major Kyrie – Gloria – Credo – Sanctus & Benedictus – Agnus Dei	Nov. 1819– Sept. 1822	Text: Mass ordinary (other settings: D 24E, 31, 45, 49, 56, 66, 105, 167, 324, 452, 755 and 950); For satbSATB and orchestra; Two versions: 1st publ. in 1875 – 2nd in AGA
679–708							1820	Up ↑
681	681	(1930)		VII/2, 6	Twelve Ländler, D 681	Various keys	c. 1815	For piano; Nos. 1–4 are lost
682	682	(1895)	XX, 10; No. 599	IV, 12	Über allen Zauber Liebe	Sie hüpfte mit mir auf grünem Plan	1820–1824	Text by Mayrhofer; Fragment
683	732				Die Wolkenbraut	Der Jäger ruhte hingegossen		See D 732 No. 11
684	684	(1850)	XX, 6 No. 378	IV, 12	Die Sterne, D 684	Du staunest, o Mensch	1820	Text by Schlegel, F., from Abendröte II, 8
685	685	4,2 (1821)	XX, 6 No. 379	IV, 1a	Morgenlied, D 685	Eh' die Sonne früh aufersteht	1820	Text by Werner
686	686	20,2 (1823) (1970)	XX, 6 No. 380	IV, 1a & b No. 15	Frühlingsglaube	Die linden Lüfte sind erwacht	Sep. 1820– Nov. 1822	Text by Uhland; Three versions: 3rd, in AGA, is Op. 20 No. 2
687	687	(1872)	XX, 6 No. 372	IV, 12	Nachthymne	Hinüber wall' ich	January; 1820	Text by Novalis
688	688	(1871)	XX, 10; Nos. 575– 578	IV, 12	Vier Canzonen	1. Non t'accostar all'urna – 2. Guarda, che bianca luna – 3. Da quel sembiante appresi – 4. Mio ben, ricordati	January; 1820	Text by Vittorelli (Nos. 1–2) and Metastasio (No. 3 from L'eroe cinese I, 3 – No. 4 from Alessandro nell'Indie III, 7)
689	689	(1865) (1892)	XVII; No. 1	II, 10	Lazarus, oder: Die Feier der Auferstehung	(Scenic oratorio in three acts)	early 1820– Mar. 1820	Text by Niemeyer; For sssttbSATB and orchestra (piano reduction in 1865 publ.); Unfinished: Nos. 1–21 (Act I) – Nos. 22–29 (Act II)
690	690	(1830)	XX, 6 No. 376	IV, 12	Abendröte	Tiefer sinket schon die Sonne	March 1823	Text by Schlegel, F., from Abendröte I
691	691	172p,6 (1865)	XX, 6 No. 373	IV, 12	Die Vögel	Wie lieblich und fröhlich	March 1820	Text by Schlegel, F., from Abendröte I, 2
692	692	(1872)	XX, 6 No. 374	IV, 12	Der Knabe	Wenn ich nur ein Vöglein wäre	March 1820	Text by Schlegel, F., from Abendröte I, 3
693	693	(1872)	XX, 6 No. 375	IV, 12	Der Fluß	Wie rein Gesang sich windet	March 1820	Text by Schlegel, F., from Abendröte I, 4
694	694	(1842)	XX, 6 No. 377	IV, 12	Der Schiffer, D 694	Friedlich lieg' ich hingegossen	March 1820	Text by Schlegel, F.
695	695	(1895)	XX, 10; No. 587	IV, 12	Namenstagslied	Vater, schenk' mir diese Stunde	19/3/1820?	Text by Stadler, A.
696	696	113p (1829)	XIV No. 18	I, 9 No. 11	Sechs Antiphonen zum Palmsonntag	Hosanna filio David – In monte Oliveti – Sanctus – Pueri Hebraeorum – Cum angelis et pueris – Ingrediente Domino	26/3/1820	For SATB
697	697	18,É6 (1823) (1889)	XII; No. 28; No. 2,É6	VII/2, 6	Six Écossaises, D 697	A♭ major	May 1820	For piano; No. 5 is 6th Écossaise of Op. 18
698	698	(1832)	XX, 6 No. 381	IV, 12	Des Fräuleins Liebeslauschen	Hier unten steht ein Ritter	September; 1820	Text by Schlechta
699	699	(1831)	XX, 6 No. 383	IV, 12	Der entsühnte Orest	Zu meinen Füßen brichst du dich	September; 1820	Text by Mayrhofer
700	700	(1831)	XX, 6 No. 384	IV, 12	Freiwilliges Versinken	Wohin? o Helios!	September; 1820	Text by Mayrhofer
701	701	(1929)		II, 15	Sakuntala (also spelled Sacontala or Sakontala)	(Opera in three acts)	Oct. 1820– spring 1821	Text by Neumann after Kalidasa's Shakuntala; For ssssssttttttbbbbbbSATB and orchestra; Unfinished (all numbers are sketches): Nos. 1–7 (Act I, last pages publ. in 1929) – Nos. 8a–11 (Act II)
702	702	8,1 (1822)	XX, 6 No. 385	IV, 1a	Der Jüngling auf dem Hügel	Ein Jüngling auf dem Hügel	November; 1820	Text by Hüttenbrenner, H.
703	703	(1870) (1897)	V No. 12; XXII v5	VI, 5 No. 13 & Anh.	String Quartet No. 12	C minor	December; 1820	Allegro assai (a.k.a. Quartettsatz, publ. 1870) – Andante (fragment)
704	714							See D 714
705	705	(1897)	XXI, 4 No. 34	III, 3 Anh. II No. 5	Gesang der Geister über den Wassern, D 705	Des Menschen Seele gleicht dem Wasser	December; 1820	Text by Goethe (other settings: D 484, 538 and 714); Sketch for ttbb and piano
706	706	132p (1832)	XVIII; No. 2	III, 3 No. 25; Anh. III No. 2 Anh. IV No. 5	Psalm 23 (22)	Gott ist mein Hirt, mir wird nichts mangeln	December; 1820	Text by Mendelssohn, M., translating Psalm 23; For ssaa and piano
707	707	36,1 (1825) (1895)	XX, 6 No. 387	IV, 2a & b No. 4	Der zürnenden Diana	Ja, spanne nur den Bogen	December; 1820	Text by Mayrhofer; Two versions: 2nd is Op. 36 No. 1
708	708	(1832)	XX, 6 No. 387	IV, 12	Im Walde, D 708, a.k.a. Waldesnacht	Windes Rauschen, Gottes Flügel	December; 1820	Text by Schlegel, F.
708A–732							1821	Up ↑
615	708A			V, 6 No. 10	Symphony, D 708A	D major	1821 or later	Sketches of four movements
709	709	(1891)	XVI; No. 31	III, 4 No. 47	Frühlingsgesang, D 709	Schmücket die Locken mit duftigen Kränzen	March 1822 or earlier	Text by Schober (other setting, partly reusing music of this setting: D 740); For ttbb
710	710	(1849)	XVI; No. 15	III, 3 No. 26	Im Gegenwärtigen Vergangenes	Ros und Lilie morgentaulich	March 1821?	Text by Goethe; For ttbb and piano
711	711	13,2 (1822) (1970)	XX, 5 No. 294	IV, 1a & b No. 11	Lob der Tränen	Laue Lüfte, Blumendüfte	1818–1821?	Text by Schlegel, A. W.; Two versions: 2nd, in AGA, is Op. 13 No. 2
712	712	(1842)	XX, 6 No. 389	IV, 13	Die gefangenen Sänger	Hörst du von den Nachtigallen	January; 1821	Text by Schlegel, A. W.
713	713	87,1 (1827) (1895)	XX, 6 No. 390	IV, 4	Der Unglückliche	Die Nacht bricht an	January; 1821	Text by Pichler; Two versions: 2nd is Op. 87 No. 1
714; 704	714	167p (1858) (1891)	XVI; No. 3 & No. 45	III, 1	Gesang der Geister über den Wassern, D 714	Des Menschen Seele gleicht dem Wasser	Dec. 1820– Feb. 1821	Text by Goethe (other settings: D 484, 538 and 705); For ttttbbbb, two violas, two cellos and double bass; Two versions: 1st, a sketch, was D 704 – 2nd is Op. posth. 167
715	715	(1845)	XX, 6 No. 391	IV, 13	Versunken	Voll Locken kraus ein Haupt so rund	February; 1821	Text by Goethe
716	716	(1832)	XX, 6 No. 393	IV, 13	Grenzen der Menschheit	Wenn der uralte heilige Vater	March 1821	Text by Goethe; For b and piano
717	717	31 (1825)	XX, 6 No. 397	IV, 2a	Suleika II	Ach um deine feuchten Schwingen	March? 1821	Text by Willemer
718	718	(1824)	XI No. 8	VII/2, 4	Variation on a Waltz by Anton Diabelli	C minor	March 1821	For piano; No. 38 in Vaterländischer Künstlerverein Vol. II
719	719	14,2 (1822)	XX, 6 No. 392	IV, 1a	Geheimes	Über meines Liebchens Äugeln	March 1821	Text by Goethe
720	720	14,1 (1822)	XX, 6 No. 396	IV, 1a & b No. 13	Suleika I	Was bedeutet die Bewegung?	March 1821	Text by Willemer; Two versions; 2nd, in AGA, is Op. 14 No. 1
721	721	(1895)	XX, 10; No. 600	IV, 13	Mahomets Gesang, D 721	Seht den Felsenquell	March 1821	Text by Goethe (other setting: D 549); For b and piano; Fragment
722	722	(1889)	XII; No. 19	VII/2, 6	German Dance, D 722	G♭ major	8/3/1821	For piano
723	723	(1893)	XV, 7 No. 15	II, 18	Duet and Aria for Hérold's Das Zauberglöckchen	Nein, nein, nein, nein, das ist zu viel – Der Tag entflieht, der Abend glüht	Apr.–May; 1821	Text by Théaulon, transl. by Treitschke;Duet for tb and aria for t (both with orchestra)
724	724	11,2 (1822)	XVI; No. 5	III, 3 No. 27	Die Nachtigall	Bescheiden verborgen im buschigten Gang	22/4/1821 or earlier	Text by Unger; For ttbb and piano
725	725	(1929)		III, 2b Anh. No. 5	Duet, D 725	Linde Lüfte wehen, or: Linde Weste wehen	April 1821	Fragment for mezzo-soprano, tenor and piano
726	726	(1870)	XX, 6 No. 394	IV, 3	Mignon I, D 726	Heiß mich nicht reden	April 1821	Text by Goethe, from Wilhelm Meister's Apprenticeship (other setting: D 877 No. 2)
727	727	(1850)	XX, 6 No. 395	IV, 3	Mignon II, D 727	So laßt mich scheinen, bis ich werde	April 1821	Text by Goethe, from Wilhelm Meister's Apprenticeship (other settings: D 469 and 877 No. 3)
728	728	(1895)	XX, 10; No. 601	IV, 13	Johanna Sebus	Der Damm zerreißt	April 1821	Text by Goethe; Fragment
729	729	(1894) (1934)		V, 6 No. 7 & Anh 1	Symphony No. 7	E major	August; 1821	Adagio, Allegro – Andante – Scherzo – Allegro giusto; Sketches; First editions are completions by others (piano reduction in 1894)
730	730	(1926)		I, 9 No. 8	Tantum ergo, D 730	B♭ major	16/8/1821	Text by Aquinas (other settings: D 460, 461, 739, 750, 962 and Anh. I/17); For satbSATB and orchestra
731	731	173p,4 (1821)	XX, 6 No. 399	IV, 5	Der Blumen Schmerz	Wie tönt es mir so schaurig	September; 1821	Text by Majláth; Publ. as Op. posth. 173 No. 4 in 1867
732; 683	732	(1833) (1834) (1867) (1882) (1892)	XV, 4 No. 8 (Ov.); XV, 5 No. 9	II, 6a–c IV, 14	Alfonso und Estrella	(Opera in three acts)	20/9/1821– 27/2/1822	Text by Schober; For two sopranos, two tenors, bass, two baritones, SATB and orchestra (piano reduction in 1882 publ.); Overture (also used as overture to D 797, publ. 1867, piano reductions: D 759A and 773) – Act I: Nos. 1–10 (No. 8 publ. 1833 with piano reduction) – Act II: Nos. 11–22 (No. 11 was also D 683 and some of its music reappears in No. 19 of D 911, No. 13 publ. 1834 with piano reduction) – Act III: Nos. 23–34
733–767							1822	Up ↑
733	733	51 (1826)	IX, 1 No. 3	VII/1, 4	Trois Marches militaires	D major G major E♭ major	Summer– Autumn; 1818?	For piano duet
734	734	67 (1826)	XII; No. 5	VII/2, 7a	16 Ländler and 2 Écossaises, a.k.a. Wiener Damen-Ländler	Various keys	before 15/12/1826	For piano
735	735	49 (1825)	XII; No. 23	VII/2, 7a	Galop and Eight Écossaises	Various keys	before 21/11/1825	For piano
736	736	(1842)	XX, 7 No. 402	IV, 13	Ihr Grab	Dort ist ihr Grab	1822?	Text by Engelhardt (a.k.a. Richard Roos)
737	737	56,2 (1826)	XX, 7 No. 414	IV, 3	An die Leier	Ich will von Atreus Söhnen	1822 or 1823?	Text by Bruchmann translating Anacreon
738	738	56,3 (1826)	XX, 7 No. 415	IV, 3	Im Haine	Sonnenstrahlen durch die Tannen	1822 or 1823?	Text by Bruchmann
739	739	45 (1825)	XIV No. 6	I, 9 No. 5	Tantum ergo, D 739	C major	1814	Text by Aquinas (other settings: D 460, 461, 730, 750, 962 and Anh. I/17); For SATB and orchestra
740	740	16,1 (1823)	XVI; No. 7	III, 3 No. 28; Anh. III No. 3 Anh. IV No. 6	Frühlingsgesang, D 740	Schmücket die Locken mit duftigen Kränzen	January– early April; 1822	Text by Schober (other setting, of which the music is partly reused in this setting: D 709); For ttbb and piano
741	741	20,1 (1823)	XX, 6 No. 400	IV, 1a	Sei mir gegrüßt	O du Entriß'ne mir	late 1821– autumn 1822	Text by Rückert
742	742	68 (1822)	XX, 7 No. 401	IV, 3	Der Wachtelschlag	Ach! mir schallt's dorten so lieblich hervor	before 30/7/1822	Text by Sauter; Publ. as Op. 68 in 1827
743	743	23,2 (1823)	XX, 7 No. 406	IV, 2a	Selige Welt	Ich treibe auf des Lebens Meer	autumn 1822?	Text by Senn; For b and piano
744	744	23,3 (1823)	XX, 7 No. 407	IV, 2a	Schwanengesang, D 744	Wie klag' ich's aus das Sterbegefühl	autumn 1822?	Text by Senn
745	745	73 (1822) (1895)	XX, 7 No. 408	IV, 3	Die Rose	Es lockte schöne Wärme	1822	Text by Schlegel, F., from Abendröte I, 6; Two versions: 1st publ. as Op. 73 in 1827
746	746	(1831)	XX, 7 No. 422	IV, 13	Am See, D 746	In des Sees Wogenspiele	1822 or 1823?	Text by Bruchmann
747	747	11,3 (1822)	XVI; No. 6	III, 3 No. 29	Geist der Liebe, D 747	Der Abend schleiert Flur und Hain	January; 1822	Text by Matthisson (other setting: D 414); For ttbb and piano
748	748	157p (1822)	XVII; No. 3	III, 1	Am Geburtstage des Kaisers	Steig empor, umblüht von Segen	January; 1822	Text by Deinhardstein; For satbSATB and orchestra; Publ. with a modified text as Op. posth. 157 in 1849
749	749	(1850)	XX, 10; No. 588	IV, 13	Herrn Josef Spaun, Assessor in Linz	Und nimmer schreibst du?	January; 1822	Text by Collin, M. C.
750	750	(1888)	XIV No. 8	I, 9 No. 9	Tantum ergo, D 750	D major	22/3/1822	Text by Aquinas (other settings: D 460, 461, 730, 739, 962 and Anh. I/17); For SATB and orchestra
751	751	23,1 (1823)	XX, 7 No. 410	IV, 2a	Die Liebe hat gelogen	Die Liebe hat gelogen	before 17/4/1822	Text by Platen
752	752	(1872)	XX, 7 No. 403	IV, 13	Nachtviolen	Nachtviolen, Nachtviolen	April 1822	Text by Mayrhofer
753	753	65,3 (1826)	XX, 7 No. 404	IV, 3	Heliopolis I a.k.a. Aus Heliopolis	Im kalten, rauhen Norden	April 1822	Text by Mayrhofer
754	754	(1842)	XX, 7 No. 405	IV, 13	Heliopolis II a.k.a. Im Hochgebirge	Fels auf Felsen hingewälzet	April 1822	Text by Mayrhofer; For b and piano
755	755			I, 5 Anh.	Kyrie, D 755	A minor Kyrie	May 1822	Text: Mass ordinary (other settings: D 24E, 31, 45, 49, 56, 66, 105, 167, 324, 452, 678 and 950); For satbSATB, strings and organ; Sketch
756	756	59,1 (1826) (1895)	XX, 7 No. 409	IV, 3	Du liebst mich nicht	Mein Herz ist zerrissen, du liebst mich nicht!	July 1822	Text by Platen; Two versions: 2nd is Op. 59 No. 1
757	757	133p (1839)	XVIII; No. 3	III, 3 No. 30; Anh. III No. 4	Gott in der Natur	Groß ist der Herr!	August; 1822	Text by Kleist; For ssaa and piano
	757A			VII/2, 4	March, D 757A	B minor	1822	For piano
758	758	108,2 (1829)	XX, 7 No. 411	IV, 5	Todesmusik	In des Todes Feierstunde	September; 1822	Text by Schober; Two versions: 2nd is Op. 108 No. 2
759	759	(1867)	I, 2 No. 8 XXII v1	V, 3 No. 7	Symphony No. 8, a.k.a. Unfinished Symphony	B minor	30/10/1822	Allegro moderato – Andante con moto – Scherzo (Fragment); D 797 No. 1 may be its 4th movement
732 (Ov.)	759A	69 (1839)		VII/2, 4	Overture to Alfonso und Estrella, D 759A	D major	November; 1822	For piano; Arranged from D 732 (see also: D 773)
760	760	15 (1823)	XI No. 1	VII/2, 5	Fantasy, D 760, a.k.a. Wanderer Fantasy	C major	November; 1822	For piano; Reuses music of D 489
761	761	23,4 (1823) (1795)	XX, 7 No. 412	IV, 2a & b No. 1	Schatzgräbers Begehr	In tiefster Erde ruht ein alt Gesetz	November; 1822	Text by Schober; Two versions: 2nd is Op. 23 No. 4
762	762	(1833)	XX, 7 No. 413	IV, 13	Schwestergruß	Im Mondenschein' wall' ich auf und ab	November; 1822	Text by Bruchmann
763	763	146p (1842)	XVII; No. 11	III, 2a No. 13	Des Tages Weihe	Schicksalslenker, blicke nieder	22/11/1822	For satb and piano
764	764	92,1 (1828) (1895)	XX, 7 No. 416	IV, 5	Der Musensohn	Durch Feld und Wald zu schweifen	early Dec. 1822	Text by Goethe; Two versions: 2nd is Op. 92 No. 1
765	765	(1868)	XX, 7 No. 417	IV, 13	An die Entfernte	So hab' ich wirklich dich verloren?	early Dec. 1822	Text by Goethe
766	766	(1872)	XX, 7 No. 418	IV, 13	Am Flusse, D 766	Verfließet, vielgeliebte Lieder	early Dec. 1822	Text by Goethe (other setting: D 160)
767	767	56,1 (1826) (1895)	XX, 7 No. 419	IV, 3	Willkommen und Abschied	Es schlug mein Herz	early Dec. 1822	Text by Goethe; Two versions: 2nd is Op. 56 No. 1
768–798							1823	Up ↑
768	768	96,3 (1827)	XX, 7 No. 420	IV, 5	Wandrers Nachtlied, D 768	Über allen Gipfeln ist Ruh	before July 1824	Text by Goethe; Publ. as Op. 96 No. 3 in 1828
769	769	(1823) (1889)	XII; No. 18	VII/2, 6 & 7a	Two German Dances, D 769	Various keys	before 19/12/1823 –Jan. 1824	For piano; No. 2 publ. in 1823
994	769A			VII/2, 2	Piano Sonata, D 769a	E minor	c. 1823	Allegro; Fragment
770	770	71 (1823)	XX, 7 No. 424	IV, 3	Drang in die Ferne	Vater, du glaubst es nicht	early 1823	Text by Leitner; Publ. as Op. 71 in 1827
771	771	22,1 (1823)	XX, 7 No. 425	IV, 1a	Der Zwerg	Im trüben Licht verschwinden schon die Berge	1822?	Text by Collin, M. C.
772	772	22,2 (1823)	XX, 7 No. 426	IV, 1a	Wehmut, D 772	Wenn ich durch Wald und Fluren geh'	1822 or 1823?	Text by Collin, M. C.
773	773	69 (1826)		VII/1, 5 No. 5	Overture to Alfonso und Estrella, D 773		1823	For piano duet; Arranged from D 732 (see also: D 759A); Publ. as Op. 69 in 1830
774	774	72 (1823)	XX, 7 No. 428	IV, 3	Auf dem Wasser zu singen	Mitten im Schimmer der spiegelnden Wellen	1823	Text by Stolberg-Stolberg; Publ. as Op. 72 in 1827
775	775	59,2 (1826)	XX, 8 No. 453	IV, 3	Daß sie hier gewesen	Daß der Ostwind Düfte hauchet	1823?	Text by Rückert
776	776	59,3 (1826)	XX, 8 No. 454	IV, 3	Du bist die Ruh	Du bist die Ruh, der Friede mild	1823	Text by Rückert
777	777	59,4 (1826)	XX, 8 No. 455	IV, 3	Lachen und Weinen	Lachen und Weinen zu jeglicher Stunde	1823?	Text by Rückert
778	778	60,1 (1826)	XX, 8 No. 456	IV, 3	Greisengesang	Der Frost hat mir bereifet	before June 1823	Text by Rückert; For b and piano; Two versions; 2nd, in AGA, is Op. 60 No. 1
	778A	(1969)		IV, 13	Die Wallfahrt	Meine Tränen im Bußgewand	1823?	Text by Rückert; For b and piano
	778B			VIII, 3	Ich hab' in mich gesogen	Ich hab' in mich gesogen den Frühling treu und lieb	1823?	Text by Rückert; Sketch; For ttbb
779	779	50 (1825)	XII; No. 4 & Anh.	VII/2, 6 & 7a	34 Valses sentimentales	Various keys	Feb. 1823 –before 21/11/1825	For piano; Early versions of Nos. 1, 2, 4, 8, 9, 12, 14 and 33 in AGA Anh.
780	780	94 (1823) (1824) (1828)	XI No. 4	VII/2, 5	Six Moments musicaux	Various keys	before Dec. 1823 –before 11/7/1828	For piano; No. 3 publ. in 1823; No. 6 publ. in 1824; Publ. as Op. 94 in 1828
781	781	(1824) (1825) (1889)	XII; No. 25 & No. 3	VII/2, 6 & 7a	Twelve Écossaises, D 781	Various keys	January; 1823	For piano; No. 1 (=Écossaise No. 2 of D 783 and AGA XII No. 3) publ. in 1825; Nos. 4 and 7 publ. in 1824
782	782	(1824)		VII/2, 7a	Écossaise, D 782	D major	before 21/2/1824	For piano
783	783	33 (1825)	XII; No. 3	VII/2, 6 & 7a	Sixteen German Dances and Two Écossaises	Various keys	Jan. 1823 –before 8/1/1825	For piano; Related to other dances, e.g. D 790 No. 2, D 781 No. 1
784	784	143p (1839)	X No. 8	VII/2, 2 No. 12	Piano Sonata, D 784	A minor	February; 1823	Allegro giusto – Andante – Allegro vivace
785	785	(1831)	XX, 7 No. 421	IV, 13	Der zürnende Barde	Wer wagt's, wer wagt's	February; 1823	Text by Bruchmann; For b and piano
786	786	123p (1830)	XX, 7 No. 423	IV, 13	Viola	Schneeglöcklein, o Schneeglöcklein	March 1823	Text by Schober
787	787	(1889) (1964)	XV, 3 No. 6	II, 7	Die Verschworenen, a.k.a. Der haüsliche Krieg	(Singspiel in one act)	completed April 1823	Text by Castelli; For ssss(s)aatt(t)bbSATB and orchestra; Overture (fragment publ. in 1964) – Nos. 1–11
788	788	(1838)	XX, 7 No. 427	IV, 13	Lied, D 788, a.k.a. Die Mutter Erde	Des Lebens Tag ist schwer und schwül	April 1823	Text by Stolberg-Stolberg
789	789	(1832)	XX, 7 No. 429	IV, 13	Pilgerweise	Ich bin ein Waller auf der Erde	April 1823	Text by Schober
790	790	171p (1864)	XII; No. 9	VII/2, 6	Twelve German Dances, D 790, a.k.a. Twelve Ländler	Various keys	May 1823	For piano; No. 2 = D 783 No. 1; No. 8 similar to D. 783 No. 1
791	791	(1867)		II, 16	Rüdiger	(Opera)	May 1823	Text by Mosel?; For ttTTBB and orchestra; Sketches of two numbers
792	792	(1833)	XX, 7 No. 430	IV, 13	Vergißmeinnicht	Als der Frühling	May 1823	Text by Schober
793	793	173p,2 (1867)	XX, 7 No. 431	IV, 13	Das Geheimnis, D 793	Sie konnte mir kein Wörtchen sagen	May 1823	Text by Schiller (other setting: D 250)
794	794	37,1 (1825) (1909)	XX, 7 No. 432	IV, 2a & b No. 6	Der Pilgrim	Noch in meines Lebens Lenze	May 1823	Text by Schiller; Two versions (merged into one in AGA): 1st is fragment – 2nd is Op. 37 No. 1
795	795	25 (1824)	XX, 7 Nos. 433– 452	IV, 2a & Anh. No. 2–5	Die schöne Müllerin (1. Das Wandern – 2. Wohin? – 3. Halt! – 4. Danksagung an den Bach – 5. Am Feierabend – 6. Der Neugierige – 7. Ungeduld – 8. Morgengruß – 9. Des Müllers Blumen – 10. Tränenregen – 11. Mein! – 12. Pause – 13. Mit dem grünen Lautenbande – 14. Der Jäger – 15. Eifersucht und Stolz – 16. Die liebe Farbe – 17. Die böse Farbe – 18. Trockne Blumen – 19. Der Müller und der Bach – 20. Des Baches Wiegenlied)	1. Das Wandern ist des Müllers Lust – 2. Ich hört' ein Bächlein rauschen – 3. Eine Mühle seh' ich blinken – 4. War es also gemeint – 5. Hätt' ich tausend Arme zu rühren – 6. Ich frage keine Blume – 7. Ich schnitt' es gern in alle Rinden ein – 8. Guten Morgen, schöne Müllerin – 9. Am Bach viel kleine Blumen stehn' – 10. Wir saßen so traulich beisammen – 11. Bächlein, laß dein Rauschen sein – 12. Meine Laute hab' ich gehängt an die Wand – 13. Schad' um das schöne grüne Band – 14. Was sucht denn der Jäger – 15. Wohin so schnell – 16. In Grün will ich mich kleiden – 17. Ich möchte zieh'n in die Welt hinaus – 18. Ihr Blümlein alle – 19. Wo ein treues Herze – 20. Gute Ruh', gute Ruh'	October?– November; 1823	Text by Müller, W.
796; 333	796	76 (1827) (1840) (1867) (1872) (1886)	XV, 6 No. 10	II, 8a–c	Fierabras, also spelled Fierrabras	(Opera in three acts); Vocal numbers include 5. Laß uns mutvoll hoffen and 6b. Was quälst du mich, o Mißgeschick	25/5/1823– 2/10/1823	Text by Kupelwieser; Music for three sopranos, three tenors, three basses, baritone, SATB and orchestra; Overture (Schubert's piano duet version is D 798, Czerny's piano duet version publ. in 1827 as Schubert's Op. 76, orchestral score publ. in 1867) – Act I: Nos. 1–6 – Act II: Nos. 7–17 (No. 7 reuses music of D 982 No. 3, No. 15 reuses music of D 326 No. 14) – Act III: Nos. 18–23 (No. 21 publ. with piano reduction in 1840, last part of No. 21 was D 333, No. 22 publ. with piano reduction in 1872)
797	797	26 (1824) (1828) (1866) (1867) (1891)	XV, 4 No. 8	II, 9 III, 2b Anh. No. 6–7; III, 3 No. 31; IV, 2a	Rosamunde, Fürstin von Zypern (1. Entre'acte I – 2. Ballet I – 3a. Entre'acte II – 3b. Romanze a.k.a. Ariette – 4. Geisterchor – 5. Entre'acte III – 6. Hirtenmelodien – 7. Hirtenchor – 8. Jagerchor – 9. Ballet II)	(Incidental music for a play in three acts); Vocal numbers: 3b. Der Vollmond strahlt auf Bergeshöhn – 4. In der Tiefe wohnt das Licht – 7. Hier auf den Fluren – 8. Wie lebt sich's so fröhlich im Grünen	autumn 1823	Text by Chézy; For aSATB and orchestra; (Overture: see D 644 and 732) – Nos. 1–9 (Nos. 1 and 5 publ. in 1866, Nos. 2 and 9 publ. in 1867, No. 3b publ. with piano reduction as Op. 26 in 1824, Nos. 4, 7 and 8 publ. with piano reduction in 1828 or 1834, No. 4 publ. 1828; No. 5 partly reused in D 935 No. 3 and Andante of D 804)
798	798	(1897)	XXI, 2 No. 7	VII/1, 5 No. 6	Overture to Fierabras		after 2/10/1823	Arrangement for piano duet of D 796's overture
799–822							1824	Up ↑
799	799	(1832)	XX, 8 No. 463	IV, 13	Im Abendrot, D 799	Oh, wie schön ist deine Welt	1824 or Feb. 1825	Text by Lappe
800	800	41 (1825) (1827)	XX, 8 No. 465	IV, 2a	Der Einsame	Wann meine Grillen schwirren	early 1825	Text by Lappe; Two near-identical versions: 2nd publ. as Op. 41 in 1827
801	801	60,2 (1826)	XX, 8 No. 457	IV, 3	Dithyrambe, D 801	Nimmer, das glaubt mir, erscheinen die Götter	before 10/6/1826	Text by Schiller (other setting: D 47); For b and piano
802	802	160p (1850)	VIII; No. 7	VI, 8 No. 5 & anh. 2	Variations on "Trockne Blumen"	E minor	January; 1824	For flute and piano; Introduction, Theme (D 795 No. 18) and 7 Variations
803	803	166p (1851) (1898)	III No. 1	VI, 1 No. 3	Octet, D 803	F major	February– 1/3/1824	For clarinet, bassoon, horn, string quartet and double bass; Movements 4 and 5 missing in 1st publ.
804	804	29 (1824)	V No. 13	VI, 5 No. 14	String Quartet No. 13 Rosamunde	A minor	Feb.–early; March 1824	Allegro ma non troppo – Andante (after D 797 No. 5) – Minuet – Allegro moderato
805	805	(1833)	XX, 8 No. 458	IV, 13	Der Sieg	O unbewölktes Leben	early March; 1824	Text by Mayrhofer; For b and piano
806	806	(1833)	XX, 8 No. 459	IV, 13	Abendstern	Was weilst du einsam an dem Himmel	early March; 1824	Text by Mayrhofer
807	807	(1842)	XX, 8 No. 460	IV, 13	Auflösung	Verbirg dich, Sonne	March 1824	Text by Mayrhofer
808	808	(1872)	XX, 8 No. 461	IV, 13	Gondelfahrer, D 808	Es tanzen Mond und Sterne	early March; 1824	Text by Mayrhofer (other setting: D 809)
809	809	28 (1824)	XVI; No. 9	III, 3 No. 32	Gondelfahrer, D 809	Es tanzen Mond und Sterne	March 1824	Text by Mayrhofer (other setting: D 808); For ttbb and piano
810	810	(1831)	V No. 14	VI, 5 No. 15	String Quartet No. 14 Death and the Maiden	D minor	March 1824	Allegro – Andante con moto (after D 531) – Scherzo – Presto
811	811	149p (1850)	XIV No. 19	I, 9 No. 14	Salve Regina, D 811	C major Salve Regina	April 1824	Text: Salve Regina (other settings: D 27, 106, 223, 386 and 676); For ttbb
812	812	140p (1837)	IX, 2 No. 12	VII/1, 2 No. 1	Sonata, D 812, a.k.a. Grand Duo	C major	June 1824	For piano duet; Allegro moderato – Andante – Scherzo – Allegro vivace
813	813	35 (1825)	IX, 2 No. 16	VII/1, 2 No. 2	Eight Variations on an original theme	A♭ major	late May–mid; July 1824	For piano duet
814	814	(1869)	IX, 3 No. 27	VII/1, 4	Four Ländler, D 814	Various keys	July 1824	For piano duet; No. 1 also as Allemande D 366 No. 17
815	815	139pI (1840)	XVII; No. 10	III, 2a No. 14	Gebet, D 815	Du Urquell aller Güte	September; 1824	Text by Motte Fouqué; For satb and piano
816	816	(1956)		VII/2, 6	Three Écossaises	Various keys	September; 1824	For piano
817	817	(1928)		VII/2, 5	Ungarische Melodie	B minor	2/9/1824	For piano; Reappears in D 818
818	818	54 (1826)	IX, 3 No. 19	VII/1, 2 No. 3	Divertissement à l'hongroise	G minor	autumn 1824?	For piano duet; Partly based on D 817
819	819	40 (1825)	IX, 1 No. 2	VII/1, 4	Six Grandes Marches	Various keys	1818 or 1824	For piano duet
820	820	(1931)		VII/2, 6	Six German Dances, D 820	Various keys	October; 1824	For piano
821	821	(1871)	VIII; No. 8	VI, 8 No. 6	Arpeggione Sonata	A minor	November; 1824	Allegro moderato – Adagio – Allegretto
822	822	(1842)	XX, 8 No. 464	III, 3 Anh. II No. 6	Lied eines Kriegers	Des stolzen Männerlebens schönste Zeichen	31/12/1824	For b, unison men's choir and piano
823–862							1825	Up ↑
823	823	63 & 84 (1826) (1827)	IX, 3 Nos. 20–22	VII/1, 2 No. 4	Divertissement sur des motifs originaux français	E minor	before 17/6/1826– before 6/7/1827	For piano duet; Tempo di Marcia (publ. as Divertissement en Forme d'une Marche brillante et raisonnée Op. 63 in 1826) – Theme and variations (publ. as Andantino varié Op. 84 No. 1 in 1827) – Rondo (publ. as Rondeau brillant Op. 84 No. 2 in 1827)
824	824	61 (1826)	IX, 3 No. 25	VII/1, 4	Six Polonaises	Various keys	April 1826	For piano duet
825; No. 1	825	64,1 (1828)	XVI; No. 24	III, 4 No. 52	Wehmut, D 825	Die Abendglocke tönet	before summer 1826	Text by Hüttenbrenner, H.; For ttbb
825; No. 2	825A	64,2 (1828)	XVI; No. 25	III, 4 No. 53	Ewige Liebe	Ertönet, ihr Saiten, in nächtlicher Ruh	before summer 1826	Text by Schulze; For ttbb
825; No. 3	825B	64,3 (1828)	XVI; No. 26	III, 4 No. 54	Flucht	In der Freie will ich leben	early 1825	Text by Lappe; For ttbb
826	826	(1892)	XVII; No. 14	III, 2a No. 17	Der Tanz	Es redet und träumet die Jugend so viel	early 1828	Text by Schnitzer von Meerau?; For satb and piano
827	827	43,2 (1825) (1975)	XX, 8 No. 470	IV, 2a & b No. 10	Nacht und Träume	Heil'ge Nacht, du sinkest nieder!	before June 1823	Text by Collin, M. C.; Two versions: 2nd, in AGA, is Op. 43 No. 2
828	828	43,1 (1825)	XX, 8 No. 469	IV, 2a	Die junge Nonne	Wie braust durch die Wipfel	early 1825	Text by Craigher de Jachelutta
829	829	(1873)	XX, 10; No. 603	IV, 13	Abschied, D 829, a.k.a. Abschied von der Erde	Leb' wohl du schöne Erde	before 17/2/1826	Text by Pratobevera; Melodrama for spoken voice and piano
830	830	85,1 (1828)	XX, 9 No. 541	IV, 4	Lied der Anne Lyle	Wärst du bei mir im Lebenstal	early 1825?	Text by Macdonald quoted in Scott's Montrose (transl.)
831	831	85,2 (1828)	XX, 9 No. 542	IV, 4	Gesang der Norna	Mich führt mein Weg wohl meilenlang	early 1825	Text by Scott from The Pirate transl. by Spiker
832	832	(1830)	XX, 8 No. 466	IV, 13	Des Sängers Habe	Schlagt mein ganzes Glück in Splitter	February; 1825	Text by Schlechta
833	833	101p,2 (1827) (1895)	XX, 8 No. 468	IV, 5	Der blinde Knabe	O sagt, ihr Lieben, mir einmal	April 1825	Text by Cibber transl. by Craigher de Jachelutta; Two versions: 2nd publ. as Op. posth. 101 No. 2 in 1828
834	834	93,1 (1828) (1835)	XX, 8 No. 476	IV, 5	Im Walde, D 834	Ich wandre über Berg und Tal	March 1825 –Sep. 1827	Text by Schulze; Two versions: 2nd, publ. 1828, in AGA
835	835	52,3 (1826)	XVI; No. 10	III, 3 No. 33; IV, 3	Bootgesang a.k.a. Boat Song	Triumph, er naht (Hail to the chief)	1825	Text by Scott from The Lady of the Lake transl. by Storck (Canto II, 19); For ttbb and piano
836	836	52,4 (1826)	XVIII; No. 1	III, 3 No. 9 IV, 3	Coronach: Totengesang der Frauen und Mädchen	Er ist uns geschieden (He is gone to the mountain)	1825	Text by Scott from The Lady of the Lake transl. by Storck (Canto III, 16); For SSA and piano
837	837	52,1 (1826)	XX, 8 No. 471	IV, 3	Ellens Gesang I a.k.a. Ellen's Song (I)	Raste, Krieger, Krieg ist aus (Soldier rest! thy warfare o'er)	April– July 1825	Text by Scott from The Lady of the Lake transl. by Storck (Canto I, 31)
838	838	52,2 (1826)	XX, 8 No. 472	IV, 3	Ellens Gesang II a.k.a. Ellen's Song (II)	Jäger, ruhe von der Jagd! (Huntsman rest! thy chase is done)	April– July 1825	Text by Scott from The Lady of the Lake transl. by Storck (Canto I, 32)
839	839	52,6 (1826)	XX, 8 No. 474	IV, 3	Ave Maria a.k.a. Ellens Gesang III: Hymne an die Jungfrau	Ave Maria! Jungfrau mild (Ave Maria! maiden mild)	April 1825	Text by Scott from The Lady of the Lake transl. by Storck (Canto III, 29)
840	840	(1839) (1861)	XXI, 3 No. 14	VII/2, 2 No. 13	Piano Sonata, D 840 ("Reliquie")	C major	April 1825	Moderato – Andante (publ. 1839) – Minuet (fragment) – Rondo (fragment)
841	841	(1930)		VII/2, 6	Two German Dances, D 841	Various keys	April 1825	For piano
842	842	(1833)	XX, 8 No. 467	IV, 13	Totengräbers Heimwehe	O Menschheit, o Leben, was soll's?	April 1825	Text by Craigher de Jachelutta
843	843	52,7 (1826)	XX, 8 No. 475	IV, 3	Lied des gefangenen Jägers – Lay of the Imprisoned Huntsman	Mein Roß so müd – My hawk is tired	April 1825	Text by Scott from The Lady of the Lake transl. by Storck (Canto VI, 24)
844	844	(1897)	XXI, 3 No. 31	VII/2, 6	Waltz, D 844, a.k.a. Albumblatt	G major	16/4/1825	For piano
845	845	42 (1826)	X No. 9	VII/2, 2 No. 14	Piano Sonata, D 845	A minor	before end May 1825	Moderato – Andante – Scherzo – Rondo
846	846	52,5 (1826)	XX, 8 No. 473	IV, 3	Normans Gesang	Die Nacht bricht bald herein	April 1825	Text by Scott from The Lady of the Lake transl. by Storck (Canto II, 23)
847	847	155p (1849)	XVI; No. 29	III, 4 No. 55	Trinklied aus dem 16. Jahrhundert	Edit Nonna, edit Clerus	July 1825	Text by Gräffer; For ttbb
848	848	156p (1849)	XVI; No. 30	III, 4 No. 56	Nachtmusik	Wir stimmen dir mit Flötensang	July 1825	Text by Seckendorff; For ttbb
849	944				Gmunden-Gastein Symphony	C major	Jun.–Sep. 1825	Probably identical to D 944 (if not: lost); See also D Anh. I/6A
850	850	53 (1826)	X No. 11	VII/2, 2 No. 15	Piano Sonata, D 850 ("Gasteiner")	D major	August 1825	Allegro vivace – Con moto – Scherzo – Rondo
851	851	79,1 (1827) (1895)	XX, 8 No. 478	IV, 3	Das Heimweh, D 851	Ach, der Gebirgssohn	August 1825	Text by Pyrker; Two versions: 2nd is Op. 79 No. 1
852	852	79,2 (1827)	XX, 8 No. 479	IV, 3	Die Allmacht, D 852	Groß ist Jehova, der Herr!	August 1825	Text by Pyrker (other setting: D 875A); Two versions: 2nd, in AGA, is Op. 79 No. 2
853	853	93,2 (1828) (1835)	XX, 8 No. 477	IV, 5	Auf der Bruck	Frisch trabe sonder Ruh' und Rast	Mar. or Aug. 1825– Sep. 1827	Text by Schulze; Two versions: 2nd, publ. 1828, in AGA
854	854	(1830)	XX, 8 No. 480	IV, 13	Fülle der Liebe	Ein sehnend Streben teilt mir das Herz	August 1825	Text by Schlegel, F.
855	855	(1842)	XX, 8 No. 481	IV, 13	Wiedersehn	Der Frühlingssonne holdes Lächeln	September; 1825	Text by Schlegel, A. W.
856	856	88,1 (1827)	XX, 8 No. 482	IV, 4	Abendlied für die Entfernte	Hinaus mein Blick, hinaus ins Tal	September; 1825	Text by Schlegel, A. W.
857	857	124p (1829)	XX, 8 Nos. 483– 484	IV, 13	Two scenes from Lacrimas: 1. Lied der Delphine – 2. Lied des Florio	1. Ach, was soll ich beginnen vor Liebe? – 2. Nun, da Schatten niedergleiten	September; 1825	Text by Schütz
859	859	55 (1826)	IX, 1 No. 4	VII/1, 4	Grande Marche Funèbre	C minor	after 1/12/1825	For piano duet
860	860	(1832)	XX, 8 No. 485	IV, 13	An mein Herz	O Herz, sei endlich stille	December; 1825	Text by Schulze
861	861	(1832)	XX, 8 No. 486	IV, 13	Der liebliche Stern	Ihr Sternlein, still in der Höhe	December; 1825	Text by Schulze
862	862	88,3 (1827)	XX, 8 No. 499	IV, 4	Um Mitternacht	Keine Stimme hör' ich schallen	Dec. 1825– Mar. 1826?	Text by Schulze; Two versions: 2nd is Op. 88 No. 3
863–895							1826	Up ↑
863	863			IV, 13	An Gott	Kein Auge hat dein Angesicht geschaut	1827 or earlier	Text by Hohlfeld (setting by Rindler publ. 1826); Music lost
864	864			IV, 13	Das Totenhemdchen	Starb das Kindlein	1825 or later	Text by Bauernfeld; Music lost
865	865	105,1 (1828)	XVI; No. 12	III, 3 No. 34; IV, 5	Widerspruch	Wenn ich durch Busch und Zweig	1826?–1828?	Text by Seidl; Two versions: 1st for ttbb and piano
866	866	95 (1828)	XX, 8 Nos. 508– 511	IV, 5	Vier Refrainlieder: 1. Die Unterscheidung – 2. Bei dir allein – 3. Die Männer sind méchant – 4. Irdisches Glück	1. Die Mutter hat mich jüngst gescholten – 2. Bei dir allein empfind ich, daß ich lebe – 3. Du sagtest mir es, Mutter – 4. So mancher sieht mit finstrer Miene	Summer; 1828?	Text by Seidl
867	867	105,2 (1828)	XX, 8 No. 512	IV, 5	Wiegenlied, D 867	Wie sich der Äuglein kindlicher Himmel	1826?–1828?	Text by Seidl
869	869	(1832)	XX, 8 No. 496	IV, 14	Totengräber-Weise	Nicht so düster und so bleich	1826	Text by Schlechta
870	870	80,1 (1827)	XX, 8 No. 506	IV, 4	Der Wanderer an den Mond	Ich auf der Erd', am Himmel du	1826	Text by Seidl
871	871	80,2 (1827) (1979)	XX, 8 No. 507	IV, 4	Das Zügenglöcklein	Kling die Nacht durch, klinge	1826	Text by Seidl; Two versions: 2nd, in AGA, is Op. 80 No. 2
872	872	(1854) (1870)	XIII, 2 No. 7	I, 6	Deutsche Messe mit dem Anhang "Das Gebet des Herrn" (German Mass with The Lord's Prayer appended): 1. Zum Eingang – 2. Zum Gloria – 3. Zum Evangelium und Credo – 4. Zum Offertorium – 5. Zum Sanctus – 6. Nach der Wandlung – 7. Zum Agnus Dei – 8. Schlussgesang – Anh.: Das Gebet des Herrn	1. Wohin soll ich mich wenden – 2. Ehre, Ehre sei Gott in der Höhe! – 3. Noch lag die Schöpfung formlos da – 4. Du gabst, o Herr, mir Sein und Leben – 5. Heilig, heilig, heilig, heilig ist der Herr! – 6. Betrachtend deine Huld und Güte – 7. Mein Heiland, Herr und Meister! – 8. Herr, du hast mein Flehn vernommen – Anh.: Anbetend deine Macht und Größe	summer or early fall 1827	Text by Neumann; Two versions: 1st for SATB and organ – 2nd, in AGA, adds winds, and optional double bass; Ferd. Schubert started publishing his arrangements from before 1838; Vocal score publ. in 1854
873	873	(1974)		III, 4 Anh. II No. 2 VIII, 2 No. 29	Canon, D 873	A major	January; 1826?	For six voices; Sketch
	873A			III, 4 Anh. II No. 3	Nachklänge		January; 1826?	For ttbb; Sketch
874	874			IV, 14	O Quell, was strömst du rasch und wild	O Quell, was strömst du rasch und wild	January; 1826?	Text by Schulze; Sketch
875	875	102 (1831)	XVI; No. 27	III, 3 No. 35	Mondenschein	Des Mondes Zauberblume lacht	January; 1826	Text by Schober; For ttbbb and piano (only voices in AGA, piano score in 1st ed. not original)
	875A			III, 2b Anh. No. 8	Die Allmacht, D 875A	Groß ist Jehova, der Herr!	January; 1826	Text by Pyrker (other setting: D 852); For SATB and piano; Sketch
876	876	(1838)	XX, 8 No. 487	IV, 14	Im Jänner 1817 a.k.a. Tiefes Leid	Ich bin von aller Ruh' geschieden	January; 1826	Text by Schulze
877	877	62 (1827)	XX, 8 Nos. 488– 491	III, 2b No. 23; IV, 3	Gesänge aus Wilhelm Meister (Songs from Wilhelm Meister): 1. Mignon und der Harfner – 2.–4. Lied der Mignon	1.&4. Nur wer die Sehnsucht kennt – 2. Heiß mich nicht reden, heiß mich schweigen – 3. So laßt mich scheinen, bis ich werde	January; 1826	Text by Goethe, from Wilhelm Meister's Apprenticeship (other settings: D 310, 359, 469, 481, 656, 726 and 727); No. 1 for two voices and piano; No. 2 has two versions; No. 4 reuses music of D 403
878	878	105,3 (1828)	XX, 8 No. 492	IV, 5	Am Fenster	Ihr lieben Mauern hold und traut	March 1826	Text by Seidl
879	879	105,4 (1828)	XX, 8 No. 493	IV, 5	Sehnsucht, D 879	Die Scheibe friert, der Wind ist rauh	March 1826	Text by Seidl
880	880	80,3 (1827)	XX, 8 No. 494	IV, 4	Im Freien	Draußen in der weiten Nacht	March 1826	Text by Seidl
881	881	96,4 (1828) (1895)	XX, 8 No. 495	IV, 5	Fischerweise	Den Fischer fechten Sorgen und Gram und Leid nicht an	March 1826	Text by Schlechta; Two versions: 2nd is Op. 96 No. 4
882	882	101p,1 (1828)	XX, 8 No. 497	IV, 5	Im Frühling	Still sitz' ich an des Hügels Hang	March 1826	Text by Schulze
883	883	(1832)	XX, 8 No. 498	IV, 14	Lebensmut, D 883	O wie dringt das junge Leben	March 1826	Text by Schulze
884	884	108,1 (1829)	XX, 8 No. 500	IV, 5	Über Wildemann	Die Winde sausen am Tannenhang	March 1826	Text by Schulze
885	885	66 (1826)	IX, 1 No. 5	VII/1, 4	Grande Marche Héroique	A minor	c. 3/9/1826	For piano duet
887	887	161p (1851)	V No. 15	VI, 5 No. 16	String Quartet No. 15	G major	20– 30/6/1826	Allegro molto moderato – Andante un poco mosso – Scherzo – Allegro assai
888	888	(1850)	XX, 8 No. 502	IV, 14	Trinklied, D 888	Bacchus, feister Fürst des Weins	July 1826	Text by Shakespeare from Antony and Cleopatra II, 7, transl. by Mayerhofer von Grünbühel and Bauernfeld
889	889	(1830)	XX, 8 No. 503	IV, 14	Ständchen, D 889	Horch, horch! die Lerch im Ätherblau	July 1826	Text by Shakespeare from Cymbeline II, 3, transl. by Schlegel, A. W.
890	890	(1830)	XX, 8 No. 504	IV, 14	Hippolits Lied	Laßt mich, ob ich auch still verglüh	July 1826	Text by Gerstenberg
891	891	106,4 (1828)	XX, 8 No. 505	IV, 5	An Sylvia a.k.a. An Silvia a.k.a. Gesang, D 891	Was ist Silvia, saget an	July 1826	Text by Shakespeare from The Two Gentlemen of Verona IV, 2, transl. by Bauernfeld
892	892	134p (1839)	XVI; No. 13	III, 3 No. 36	Nachthelle	Die Nacht ist heiter	September; 1826	Text by Seidl; For tenor solo, ttbb and piano
893	893	(1827)	XVI; No. 41	III, 4 No. 57	Grab und Mond	Silberblauer Mondenschein fällt herab	September; 1826	Text by Seidl; For ttbb
894	894	78 (1827)	X No. 12	VII/2, 3 No. 16	Piano Sonata, D 894 ("Fantasie")	G major	October; 1826	Molto moderato e cantabile – Andante – Minuet – Allegretto
895	895	70 (1827)	VIII; No. 1	VI, 8 No. 7	Rondo, D 895, a.k.a. Rondeau brillant	B minor	October; 1826	For violin and piano
896–936							1827	Up ↑
896	896			IV, 14	Fröhliches Scheiden	Gar fröhlich kann ich scheiden	fall 1827– early 1828	Text by Leitner; Sketch
	896A			IV, 14	Sie in jedem Liede	Nehm ich die Harfe	fall 1827– early 1828	Text by Leitner; Sketch
	896B			IV, 14	Wolke und Quelle	Auf meinen heimischen Bergen	fall 1827– early 1828	Text by Leitner; Sketch
897	897	148p (1846)	VII, 2 No. 5	VI, 7 No. 4	Notturno (Piano Trio, D 897)	E♭ major	1828?	Adagio
898	898	99p (1836)	VII, 2 No. 3	VI, 7 No. 3	Piano Trio No. 1	B♭ major	1828?	Allegro moderato – Andante un poco mosso – Scherzo – Rondo
899	899	90 (1827) (1857)	XI No. 2	VII/2, 5 & Anh.	Impromptus Nos. 1–4	C minor – E♭ major – G♭ major – A♭ major	summer– fall 1827?	For piano; Nos. 1–2 publ. 1827
900	900	(1897)	XXI, 3 No. 16	VII/2, 5 Anh.	Allegretto, D 900	C minor	1821 or later?	For piano; Fragment
901	901	(1827)	XVI; No. 37	III, 4 No. 58	Wein und Liebe	Liebchen und der Saft der Reben	before June 1827	Text by Haug; For ttbb
902	902	83 (1827)	XX, 10; Nos. 579– 581	IV, 4	Drei Gesänge: 1. L'incanto degli occhi (Die Macht der Augen) – 2. Il traditor deluso (Der getäuschte Verräter) – 3. Il modo di prender moglie (Die Art ein Weib zu nehmen)	1. Da voi, cari lumi (Nur euch, schöne Sterne) – 2. Ahimè, io tremo! (Weh mir, ich bebe!) – 3. Orsù! non ci pensiamo (Wohlan! und ohne Zagen)	1827 (before September)	Text by Metastasio, from Attilio Regolo II, 5 (No. 1, other version: D 990E) and Gioas re di Giuda II (No. 2); For b and piano
903	903	81,3 (1827)	XVI; No. 11	III, 3 No. 37; IV, 4	Zur guten Nacht	Horch auf! Es schlägt die Stunde	January; 1827	Text by Rochlitz; For vocal soloist, TTBB and piano
904	904	81,1 (1827)	XX, 4 No. 287	IV, 4	Alinde	Die Sonne sinkt ins tiefe Meer	January; 1827	Text by Rochlitz
905	905	81,2 (1827)	XX, 4 No. 288	IV, 4	An die Laute	Leiser, leiser, kleine Laute	January; 1827	Text by Rochlitz
906	906	(1832)	XX, 8 No. 514	IV, 14	Der Vater mit dem Kind	Dem Vater liegt das kind in Arm	January; 1827	Text by Bauernfeld
907	907	86 (1828) (1979)	XX, 8 No. 501	IV, 4	Romanze des Richard Löwenherz	Großer Taten tat der Ritter fern im heiligen Lande viel	March; 1826?	Text by Scott from Ivanhoe transl. by Müller, (K. L.) M. (Ch. 17); Two versions: 2nd, in AGA, is Op. 86
908	908	82,1 (1827)	IX, 2 No. 17	VII/1, 3 No. 1 Anh. No. 1	Eight Variations on a theme from Hérold's Marie	C major	February; 1827	For piano duet
909	909	96,2 (1828)	XX, 8 No. 515	IV, 5	Jägers Liebeslied	Ich schieß' den Hirsch im grünen Forst	February; 1827	Text by Schober
910	910	(1833)	XX, 8 No. 516	IV, 14	Schiffers Scheidelied	Die Wogen am Gestade schwellen	February; 1827	Text by Schober
911	911	89 (1828)	XX, 9 Nos. 517– 540	IV, 4	Winterreise: —Part I—: 1. Gute Nacht – 2. Die Wetterfahne – 3. Gefror'ne Tränen – 4. Erstarrung – 5. Der Lindenbaum – 6. Wasserflut – 7. Auf dem Flusse – 8. Rückblick – 9. Irrlicht – 10. Rast – 11. Frühlingstraum – 12. Einsamkeit; —Part II—: 13. Die Post – 14. Der greise Kopf – 15. Die Krähe – 16. Letzte Hoffnung – 17. Im Dorfe – 18. Der stürmische Morgen – 19. Täuschung – 20. Der Wegweiser – 21. Das Wirtshaus – 22. Mut – 23. Die Nebensonnen – 24. Der Leiermann	—Part I—: 1. Fremd bin ich eingezogen – 2. Der Wind spielt mit der Wetterfahne – 3. Gefror'ne Tropfen fallen – 4. Ich such' im Schnee vergebens – 5. Am Brunnen vor dem Tore – 6. Manche Trän' aus meinen Augen – 7. Der du so lustig rauschtest – 8. Es brennt mir unter beiden Sohlen – 9. In die tiefsten Felsengründe – 10. Nun merk' ich erst, wie müd ich bin – 11. Ich träumte von bunten Blumen – 12. Wie eine trübe Wolke; —Part II—: 13. Von der Straße her ein Posthorn klingt – 14. Der Reif hat einen weißen Schein – 15. Eine Krähe war mit mir aus der Stadt gezogen – 16. Hie und da ist an den Bäumen – 17. Es bellen die Hunde – 18. Wie hat der Sturm zerrissen – 19. Ein Licht tanzt freundlich vor mir her – 20. Was vermeid' ich denn die Wege – 21. Auf einen Totenacker hat mich mein Weg gebracht – 22. Fliegt der Schnee mir ins Gesicht – 23. Drei Sonnen sah ich – 24. Drüben hinterm Dorfe steht ein Leiermann	February; 1827 (Part I started); October; 1827 (Part II started)	Text by Müller, W.; Two versions for Nos. 7, 10, 11, 22 and 23; Music of No. 19 partly based on D 732 No. 11
912	912	151p (1845)	XVI; No. 28	III, 4 No. 59	Schlachtlied, D 912	Mit unserm Arm ist nichts getan	28/2/1827	Text by Klopstock, from Oden (other setting: D 443); For TTBBTTBB
913	913	139pII (1846)	XVI; No. 1	III, 1	Nachtgesang im Walde	Sei uns stets gegrüßt, o Nacht!	April 1827	Text by Seidl; For ttbb and four horns
914	914	(1897)	XXI, 4 No. 36a	III, 4 No. 60	Frühlingslied, D 914	Geöffnet sind des Winters Riegel	April 1827	Text by Pollak; Music reappears in other setting D 919); For ttbb
915	915	(1870)	XI No. 12	VII/2, 5	Allegretto, D 915	C minor	26/4/1827	For piano
916	916	(1961)		III, 4 Anh. II No. 4	Das stille Lied	Schweige nur, süßer Mund	May 1827	Text by Seegemund; For ttbb; Sketch
	916A			IV, 14	Liedentwurf, D 916A	C major	May 1827?	Sketch without text
	916B	(1978)		VII/2, 5 Anh.	Piano piece, D 916B	C major	summer– fall 1827?	Sketch
	916C	(1978)		VII/2, 5 Anh.	Piano piece, D 916C	C minor	summer– fall 1827?	Sketch
917	917	115p,1 (1829)	XX, 9 No. 543	IV, 14	Das Lied im Grünen	Ins Grüne, ins Grüne	June 1827	Text by Reil
918	918	(1868) (1962)		II, 17	Der Graf von Gleichen	(Opera in two acts)	started 19/6/1827	Text by Bauernfeld; For ssssttbbbbbbSATB and orchestra; Music for Nos. 1–20f (sketches); No. 13 partly based on D 260 and No. 20c on D 102; Completions of No. 1 publ. in 1868, as "Morgengesang im Walde", and of No. 14 in 1962; Act I: Nos. 1–11 – Act II: Nos. 12–22
919	919	(1897)	XXI, 4 No. 36b	IV, 14	Frühlingslied, D 919	Geöffnet sind des Winters Riegel	spring 1827?	Text by Pollak; Music based on other setting D 914
920; 921	920	135p (1840) (1891)	XVI; No. 14; XVIII; No. 4	III, 3 No. 38	Ständchen, D 920, a.k.a. Notturno	Zögernd leise	July 1827	Text by Grillparzer; For a, choir and piano; Two versions: choir TTBB in 1st, and SSAA in 2nd (which was D 921, publ. as Op. posth. 135)
922	922	106,1 (1828) (1895)	XX, 9 No. 544	IV, 5	Heimliches Lieben	O du, wenn deine Lippen mich berühren	September; 1827	Text by Klen(c)ke; Two versions: 2nd is Op. 106 No. 1
923	923	165p,5 (1862) (1895) (1971)	XX, 9 No. 545	III, 2b No. 24; IV, 14	Eine altschottische Ballade	Dein Schwert, wie ist’s von Blut so rot	September; 1827	Text by Herder after "Edward, Edward" from Percy's Reliques of Ancient English Poetry; For male voice, female voice and piano; Three versions: 1st is Op. posth. 165 No. 5 – 2nd for voice and piano – 3rd publ. in 1971
924	924	91 (1828)	XII; No. 7	VII/2, 7a	Twelve Grazer Waltzes	Various keys	September; 1827?	For piano
925	925	(1828)	XII; No. 24	VII/2, 7a	Grazer Galopp	C major	September; 1827?	For piano
926	926	106,2 (1828)	XX, 9 No. 546	IV, 5	Das Weinen	Gar tröstlich kommt geronnen	fall 1827– early 1828	Text by Leitner
927	927	106,3 (1828)	XX, 9 No. 547	IV, 5	Vor meiner Wiege	Das also, das ist der enge Schrein	fall 1827– early 1828	Text by Leitner
928	928	(1870)	IX, 1 No. 7	VII/1, 4	March, D 928, a.k.a. Kindermarsch	G major	12/10/1827	For piano duet
929	929	100 (1828) (1975)	VII, 2 No. 4	VI, 7 No. 2 & Anh.	Piano Trio No. 2	E♭ major	started Nov. 1827	Allegro – Andante con moto – Scherzando – Allegro moderato; Shortened version, in AGA, is Op. 100
930	930	104p (1829)	XIX; No. 2	III, 2a No. 15	Der Hochzeitsbraten	Ach liebes Herz, ach Theobald	November; 1827	Text by Schober; For stb and piano
931	931	(1835)	XX, 9 No. 548	IV, 14	Der Wallensteiner Lanzknecht beim Trunk	He! schenket mir im Helme ein!	November; 1827	Text by Leitner
932	932	(1832)	XX, 9 No. 549	IV, 14	Der Kreuzzug	Ein Münich steht in seiner Zell	November; 1827	Text by Leitner
933	933	(1835)	XX, 9 No. 550	IV, 14	Des Fischers Liebesglück	Dort blinket durch Weiden	November; 1827	Text by Leitner
934	934	159p (1850)	VIII; No. 5	VI, 8 No. 8	Fantasy, D 934	C major	December; 1827	For violin and piano; Reuses music of D 741
935	935	142p (1839)	XI No. 3	VII/2, 5 & Anh.	Impromptus Nos. 5–8	F minor – A♭ major – B♭ major – F minor	December; 1827	For piano; 7th Impromptu reuses music of D 797
936	936	(1892)	XVII; No. 15	III, 2a No. 16	Kantate für Irene Kiesewetter a.k.a. Cantate zur Feier der Genesung der Irene Kiesewetter	Al par del ruscelletto chiaro	26/12/1827	for ttbbSATB and piano duet
936A–965B							1828	Up ↑
615	936A			V, 6 No. 11 & Anh. 2	Symphony No. 10	D major	spring– summer 1828?	Sketches for [Allegro maestoso] (two versions) – Andante – Scherzo (two versions)
937	937	(1872)	XX, 10; No. 602	IV, 14	Lebensmut, D 937	Fröhlicher Lebensmut	summer 1828?	Text by Rellstab; Fragment
938	938	(1835)	XX, 9 No. 551	IV, 14	Der Winterabend, D 938	Es ist so still, so heimlich um mich	January; 1828	Text by Leitner
939	939	96,1 (1828)	XX, 9 No. 552	IV, 5	Die Sterne, D 939	Wie blitzen die Sterne so hell durch die Nacht	January; 1828	Text by Leitner
940	940	103 (1829)	IX, 3 No. 24	VII/1, 3 No. 2 & Anh. No. 1	Fantasy, D 940	F minor	January– April 1828	For piano duet
941	948							See D 948, 1st version
942	942	136p (1839)	XVII; No. 9	III, 2b No. 18	Mirjams Siegesgesang	Rührt die Zimbel, schlagt die Saiten – Aus ägypten vor dem Volke – Doch der Horizont erdunkelt – S'ist der Herr in seinem Grimme – Tauchst du auf, Pharao? – Drum mit Zimbeln und mit Saiten	March 1828	Text by Grillparzer; For sSATB and piano
943	943	119p (1829)	XX, 10; No. 568	IV, 14	Auf dem Strom	Nimm die letzten Abschiedsküsse	March 1828	Text by Rellstab; For voice, horn (or cello) and piano
944; 849	944	(1840)	I, 2 No. 7	V, 4 No. 8	Symphony No. 9, Great C major	C major	summer 1825?– March 1828	Andante, Allegro ma non troppo – Andante con moto – Scherzo – Allegro vivace; Probably identical to Gmunden-Gastein Symphony, D 849
944A	944A				German Dance, D 944A		1/3/1828	For piano; Lost
945	945	(1895)	XX, 10; No. 589	IV, 14	Herbst, D 945	Es rauschen die Winde	April 1828	Text by Rellstab
946	946	(1868)	XI No. 13	VII/2, 5	Three piano pieces, a.k.a. Impromptus, D 946	E♭ minor – E♭ major – C major	May 1828	Allegro assai, Andante – Allegretto – Allegro
947	947	144p (1840)	IX, 3 No. 23	VII/1, 3 No. 3	Allegro, D 947, a.k.a. Lebensstürme	A minor	May 1828	For piano duet
948; 941; 964	948	(1891); 154p (1849)	XVI; No. 42 (1st v.) & No. 2 (2nd v.)	I, 9 No. 15–16 & Anh. 3	Hymnus an den heiligen Geist	Komm, heil'ger Geist, erhöre unser Flehen (1st v.); Herr, unser Gott! erhöre unser Flehen (2nd v.)	May 1828	Text by Schmidl; Two versions: 1st, for ttbbTTBB, was D 941 – 2nd, Op. posth. 154 for ttbbTTBB and winds, was D 964
949	639							See D 639
950	950	(1865)	XIII, 2 No. 6	I, 4	Mass No. 6	E♭ major Kyrie – Gloria – Credo – Sanctus & Benedictus – Agnus Dei	started June 1828	Text: Mass ordinary (other settings: D 24E, 31, 45, 49, 56, 66, 105, 167, 324, 452, 678 and 755); For satbSATB and orchestra
951	951	107 (1829)	IX, 2 No. 13	VII/1, 3 No. 4 & Anh. No. 2	Rondo, D 951, a.k.a. Grand Rondeau	A major	June 1828	For piano duet
952	952	152p (1848)	IX, 3 No. 28	VII/1, 3 No. 5	Fugue, D 952	E minor	3/6/1828	For organ duet or piano duet
953	953	(1841)	XVII; No. 19	III, 2b No. 19	Psalm 92 (91)	tôw l'hôdôs ladônoj	July 1828	Text: Psalm 92; For baritone and satbSATB
954	954	(1828)	XVII; No. 5	III, 2b No. 20	Glaube, Hoffnung und Liebe, D 954	Gott, laß die Glocke glücklich steigen	before 2/9/1828	Text by Reil; For ttbbSATB acc. by winds or piano
955	955	97 (1828)	XX, 8 No. 462	IV, 5	Glaube, Hoffnung und Liebe, D 955	Glaube, hoffe, liebe!	August; 1828	Text by Kuffner
956	956	163p (1853)	IV No. 1	VI, 2 No. 2	String Quintet	C major	September; 1828?	Allegro ma non troppo – Adagio – Presto – Allegretto; For two violins, viola and two cellos
957; Nos. 1–13	957	(1829)	XX, 9 Nos. 554– 566	IV, 14	Schwanengesang, D 957, a.k.a. 13 Lieder nach Gedichten von Rellstab und Heine: —Rellstab—: 1. Liebesbotschaft – 2. Kriegers Ahnung – 3. Frühlingssehnsucht – 4. Ständchen – 5. Aufenhalt – 6. In der Ferne – 7. Abschied; —Heine—: 8. Der Atlas – 9. Ihr Bild – 11. Die Stadt – 12. Am Meer – 13. Der Doppelgänger	1. Rauschendes Bächlein, so silber und hell – 2. In tiefer Ruh liegt um mich her – 3. Säuselnde Lüfte wehen so mild – 4. Leise flehen meine Lieder – 5. Rauschender Strom, brausender Wald – 6. Wehe dem Fliehenden – 7. Ade! du muntre, du fröhliche Stadt – 8. Ich unglückselger Atlas – 9. Ich stand in dunkeln Träumen – 10. Das Fischermädchen – 11. Am fernen Horizonte – 12. Das Meer erglänzte weit hinaus – 13. Still ist die Nacht, es ruhen die Gassen	August– September? 1828	Text by Rellstab (Nos. 1–7) and Heine, H. (Nos. 8–13); D 965A was No. 14; Early versions for Nos. 1 and 3; Variant for No. 4
958	958	(1839)	X No. 13	VII/2, 3 No. 17	Piano Sonata, D 958	C minor	September; 1828	Allegro – Adagio – Minuet – Allegro
959	959	(1839)	X No. 14	VII/2, 3 No. 18	Piano Sonata, D 959	A major	September; 1828	Allegro – Andantino – Scherzo – Allegretto (partly based on 2nd movement of D 537)
960	960	(1839)	X No. 15	VII/2, 3 No. 19	Piano Sonata, D 960	B♭ major	September; 1828	Molto moderato – Andante sostenuto – Scherzo – Allegro ma non troppo
961	452							See D 452
962	962	(1890)	XXI, 4 No. 32	I, 9 No. 10 & Anh. 4	Tantum ergo, D 962	E♭ major	October; 1828	Text by Aquinas (other settings: D 460, 461, 730, 739, 750 and Anh. I/17); For satbSATB and orchestra; Sketch in AGA XIV No. 22
963	963	(1890)	XXI, 4 No. 33	I, 8	Intende voci, a.k.a. Offertory, D 963, or Aria for tenor with choir	B♭ major	October; 1828	Text: Psalm 5:3–4a, offertory for the Friday after Oculi Sunday; For tSATB and orchestra
964	948	154p (1849)	XVI; No. 2			Herr, unser Gott! erhöre unser Flehen		See D 948, 2nd version
965	965	129p (1830)	XX, 10; No. 569	IV, 14	Der Hirt auf dem Felsen	Wenn auf dem höchsten Fels ich steh	October; 1828	Text by Müller, W., and Varnhagen von Ense; For voice, clarinet and piano
957; No. 14	965A	(1829)	XX, 9 No. 567	IV, 14	Die Taubenpost	Ich hab' eine Brieftaub in meinem Sold	October; 1828	Text by Seidl; Was D 957 No. 14
	965B			VIII, 2 Nos. 15–16	Fugal exercises, D 965B		November; 1828	Partly similar to D 952
966–992							1810–1828	Up ↑
966	11							See D 11 No. 3
	966B			V, 6 No. 8	Orchestral piece, D 966B	A major	1820 or later	Sketch
968	968	(1888)	IX, 3 No. 29	VII/1, 1 No. 7	Sonatina, D 968	C major – A minor	1815–1819?	For piano duet; Allegro moderato – Andante
603	968A	82p,2 (1860)	IX, 2 No. 18	VII/1, 1 No. 8	Introduction, Variations and Finale	B♭ major	?	For piano duet
886	968B	121p (1829)	IX, 1 No. 6	VII/1, 4	Deux Marches caractéristiques	C major	spring 1826?	For piano duet
969	969	77 (1827)	XII; No. 6	VII/2, 7a	12 Valses nobles	Various keys	before 22/1/1827	For piano
970	970	(1889)	XII; No. 13	VII/2, 6	Six Ländler, D 970, a.k.a. German Dances	Various keys	?	For piano; No. 2 near-identical to D 145 No. 7
971	971	(1823)	XII; No. 14	VII/2, 7a	Three German Dances, D 971	Various keys	before 10/1/1823	For piano
972	972	(1889)	XII; No. 15	VII/2, 6	Three German Dances, D 972	Various keys	before April 1817?	For piano; No. 3 reused in D 552
973	973	(1889)	XII; No. 16	VII/2, 6	Three German Dances, D 973	Various keys	?	For piano
974	974	(1889)	XII; No. 17	VII/2, 6	Two German Dances, D 974	Various keys	?	For piano
975	975	(1889)	XII; No. 20	VII/2, 6	German Dance, D 975	D major	?	For piano
976	976	(1825)	XII; No. 22	VII/2, 7a	Cotillon	E♭ major	before 29/12/1825	For piano
977	977	(1889)	XII; No. 26	VII/2, 6	Eight Écossaises, D 977	Various keys	?	For piano
978	978	(1825)		VII/2, 7a	Waltz, D 978	A♭ major	before 29/12/1825	For piano
979	979	(1826)		VII/2, 7a	Waltz, D 979	G major	before 23/12/1826	For piano
980	980	(1826)		VII/2, 7a	Two Waltzes, D 980	Various keys	before 23/12/1826	For piano
640	980A			VII/2, 6	Two Dances, D 980A	Various keys	?	For piano; Sketches
679	980B	(1925)		VII/2, 6	Two Ländler, D 980B	E♭ major	?	For piano
680	980C	(1930)		VII/2, 6	Two Ländler, D 980C	D♭ major	?	For piano; Fragments
	980D	(1828)		VII/2, 7a	Waltz, D 980D, a.k.a. Krähwinkler Tanz	C major	before 26/1/1828	For piano
	980E			VII/2, 6	Two Dances, D 980E	Various keys	1818 or later	For piano(?); Sketches
	980F			VII/2, 6	March, D 980F	G major	?	For piano; Arr. of a lost march for orchestra?
981	981				Der Minnesänger	(Singspiel)	?	Text by Kotzebue?; Lost
982	982			II, 16	Sketches for an opera a.k.a. Sophie	(Opera)	Sep.–Oct. 1820	For satb and orchestra; Nos. 1–3 (No. 3 partly reused in D 796 No. 7)
983; No. 1	983	17,1 (1823)	XVI; No. 20	III, 4 No. 48	Jünglingswonne	So lang im deutschen Eichentale	before 9/10/1823	Text by Matthisson; For ttbb
983; No. 2	983A	17,2 (1823)	XVI; No. 21	III, 4 No. 49	Liebe	Liebe rauscht der Silberbach	before 9/10/1823	Text by Schiller, from "Der Triumph der Liebe": stanza 25; Other: D 55, 61, 62, 63, 64; For ttbb
983; No. 3	983B	17,3 (1823)	XVI; No. 22	III, 4 No. 50	Zum Rundetanz	Auf! es dunkelt; silbern funkelt	before 9/10/1823	Text by Salis-Seewis (other setting: D Anh. I/18); For ttbb
983; No. 4	983C	17,4 (1823)	XVI; No. 23	III, 4 No. 51	Die Nacht, D 983C	Wie schön bist du, freundliche Stille	before 9/10/1823	Text by Krummacher(?); For ttbb
984	984	169p (1865)		III, 3 Anh. II No. 7	Der Wintertag a.k.a. Geburtstaglied	In schöner heller Winterzeit	1821 or later?	For ttbb and piano; Fragment: piano part lost
985	985	112p,1 (1829)	XVII; No. 6	III, 2a No. 4	Gott im Ungewitter	Du Schrecklicher, wer kann vor dir und deinem Donner stehn?	?	Text by Uz; For satb and piano
986	986	112p,2 (1829)	XVII; No. 7	III, 2a No. 5	Gott der Weltschöpfer	Zu Gott, zu Gott flieg auf	?	Text by Uz; For satb and piano
988	988	(1873)	XIX; No. 26	III, 4 No. 61; VIII, 2 No. 30	Liebe säuseln die Blätter	Liebe säuseln die Blätter	?	Text by Hölty; Canon for three voices
	988A			III, 3 Anh. II No. 8	Accompaniment part	B♭ major	1821 or later	For piano, as accompaniment for a vocal composition
990	990	(1853)		IV, 14	Der Graf von Habsburg	Zu Aachen in seiner Kaiserpracht	1815–1820	Text by Schiller
990	990A	(1853)		IV, 14	Kaiser Maximilian auf der Martinswand [in Tirol]	Hinauf! hinauf! in Sprung und Lauf	1815–1820	Text by Collin, H. J.
582	990B			IV, 14	Augenblicke im Elysium	Vor der in Ehrfurcht all mein Wesen kniet	?	Text by Schober; Music lost
868	990C	130p (1830)	XX, 8 No. 513	IV, 14	Das Echo	Herzliebe gute Mutter, o grolle nicht mit mir	?	Text by Castelli
	990D			IV, 14	Die Schiffende	Sie wankt dahin! Die Abendwinde spielen	?	Text by Hölty; Music lost
	990E			IV, 4 IV, 11	L'incanto degli occhi	Da voi, cari lumi	1813–1816?	Text by Metastasio, from Attilio Regolo II (other version: D 902 No. 1); Aria for s
	990F			IV, 11	Ombre amene a.k.a. La serenata	Ombre amene	1813–1816?	Text by Metastasio; Aria for s; Formerly misidentified as an early setting of Il traditor deluso, D 902 No. 2
991	323				O so laßt euch froh begrüssen	O so laßt euch froh begrüssen		Text by Schiller; Last part of D 323
992	383							See D 383
Anh. I		Spurious and doubtful works						Up ↑
40	Anh. I/1				String Quartet, D Anh. I/1	E♭ major	1813	Doubtful: lost or identical to D 87
	Anh. I/2				String Quartet, D Anh. I/2	F major	1816	Doubtful: lost or identical to D 353
	Anh. I/3			VIII, 2 Anh. No. 2	Fugue, D Anh. I/3	C major	1812?	Spurious?; For string quartet?; Fragment: only viola part is extant
2	Anh. I/4							Spurious: fragment of a string quartet movement in G major by Stadler, A.
	Anh. I/5							Spurious: sketch for the opening movement of a string quartet in E♭ major
	Anh. I/6							Spurious: Duet in D major for two violins
	Anh. I/6A							Spurious: Symphony in E major "1825" by Gunter Elsholz (fake Gmunden-Gastein Symphony, D 849)
858	Anh. I/7			VII/1, 4	March, D Anh. I/7		November; 1825	Doubtful; Lost; For two pianos, eight hands
	Anh. I/8				Piano Sonata, D Anh. I/8	F major	1815	Doubtful: lost or identical to D 157
	Anh. I/9				Piano Sonata, D Anh. I/9	F major	1816	Doubtful: lost or identical to D 459
	Anh. I/10				Fantasy, D Anh. I/10	E♭ major	1825?	Doubtful; Lost; For piano
	Anh. I/11							Spurious: Allegro in G major and Minuet in C major, a.k.a. Sonatina; For piano; Publ. in 1967
	Anh. I/12	(1810)			Seven Easy Variations	G major	before Nov. 1810	Spurious?; For piano
	Anh. I/13				Six German Dances, D Anh. I/13		1814	Doubtful; Lost; For piano
	Anh. I/14	(1970)		VIII, 1	Waltz, D Anh. I/4, a.k.a. Kupelwieser-Walzer	G♭ major	17/9/1826	Doubtful; For piano
336	Anh. I/15	(1897)	XXI, 3 No. 26	VIII, 1	Minuet with Trio, D Anh. I/15	D major		Doubtful; For piano
	Anh. I/16	(1975)			Écossaise de Vienne	A♭ major	1821?	Doubtful: by Hüttenbrenner?; For piano
	Anh. I/17			VIII, 1	Tantum ergo, D Anh. I/17	B♭ major		Text by Aquinas (other settings: D 460, 461, 730, 739, 750 and 962); Spurious?; Fragment: only s part
132	Anh. I/18	(1974)		III, 4 Anh. I No. 2	Lied beim Rundetanz	Auf, es dunkelt, silbern funkelt	1815–1816	Text by Salis-Seewis (other setting: D 983B); Doubtful; Fragment: one voice of a part song
133	Anh. I/19	(1974)		III, 4 Anh. I No. 3	Lied im Freien, D Anh. I/19	Wie schön ist's im Freien	1815–1816	Text by Salis-Seewis (other setting: D 572); Doubtful; Fragment: one voice of a part song
339	Anh. I/20	(1974)		III, 4 Anh. I No. 4	Amors Macht	Wo Amors Flügel weben	1815–1816	Text by Matthisson; Doubtful; Fragment: one voice of a part song
340	Anh. I/21	(1974)		III, 4 Anh. I No. 5	Badelied	Zur Elbe, zur Elbe, des Äthers Gewölbe	1815–1816	Text by Matthisson; Doubtful; Fragment: one voice of a part song
341	Anh. I/22	(1974)		III, 4 Anh. I No. 6	Sylphen	Was unterm Monde gleicht uns Sylphen flink und leicht	1815–1816	Text by Matthisson; Doubtful; Fragment: one voice of a part song
425	Anh. I/23	(1974)		III, 4 Anh. I No. 7	Lebenslied, D Anh. I/23	Kommen und Scheiden	1815–1816	Text by Matthisson (other setting: D 508); Doubtful; Fragment: one voice of a part song; Related to D 425?
	Anh. I/24				Kantate auf den Vater (Cantata to his father)		27/9/1816	Doubtful; Lost
	Anh. I/25			VIII, 1	Drum Schwester und Brüder	Drum Schwester und Brüder singt fröhliche Liede	October; 1819	Doubtful; For voices and instruments; Fragment: choir text, and violin II and cello parts extant
	Anh. I/26			VIII, 1	Sturmbeschwörung	Nirgends Rettung, nirgends Land	before 1840	Spurious?; For voices; Fragment: s part extant
	Anh. I/27							Spurious: fragment of three TTB choirs with winds
512	Anh. I/28			VIII, 1	Klage, D Anh. I/28	Nimmer länger trag ich dieser Leiden Last	c. 1817	Other setting: D 432; Spurious?
	Anh. I/29			VIII, 1	Kaiser Ferdinand II.	Was reget die Stadt sich in freudiger Hast?	1853 or earlier	Doubtful
	Anh. I/30							Spurious: "Mein Frieden" (Text Ferne, ferne flammen helle Sterne by Heine, C.), publ. in 1823, by another Schubert
	Anh. I/31							Spurious: "Adieu!"/"Lebe wohl!" (Text Voici l'instant suprême by Bélanger after Wetzel, re-translated in German as Schon naht, um uns zu scheiden), publ. in 1824, by Weyrauch
598A	Anh. I/32			VIII, 2 Anh. No. 1	Themes for thoroughbass exercises		before 1812	Doubtful
Anh. II		Schubert's arrangements						Up ↑
	Anh. II/1			VIII, 1	Arrangement of Gluck's overture to Iphigénie en Aulide		early 1810?	Fragment for piano duet: last bars of the Primo part extant
96	Anh. II/2	(1926)		VIII, 1	Arrangement of Matiegka's Notturno (Trio), Op. 21, a.k.a. Quartet, D Anh. II/2	G major	26/2/1814	For flute, viola, guitar, and a cello part added by Schubert; Movements 2 (Trio II) and 5 (Var. II) recomposed by Schubert
	Anh. II/3			VIII, 1	Arrangement of two arias from Gluck's Echo et Narcisse	Rien de la nature – O combats, o désordre extrème!	March 1816	Text by Tschudi
	Anh. II/4	(1960)		VIII, 1	Arrangement of M. Stadler's 8th Psalm (Zwölf Psalmen David's No. 1: "Unendlicher! Gott, unser Herr!")	Dem Sangmeister auf Gittith, ein Psalm Davids	29/8/1823	Text by Mendelssohn, M., translating Psalm 8; For voice and orchestra; Schubert adapted and orchestrated the piano accompaniment, slightly modifying the vocal part
Anh. III		Schubert's copies of compositions by other composers						Up ↑
	Anh. III/1				Schubert's copy of nine canons by Michael Haydn and other composers: Nos. 1, 3, 4 and 6 by M. Haydn – No. 2 by M. or J. Haydn – No. 5 by Otter – No. 9 by Mozart	1. Es packe dich das Glück beim Kragen (F major) – 2. Vom Glück sei alles dir beschert (B♭ major) – 3. Glück fehl dir vor allem (G major) – 4. Wohlsein und Freude (C major) – 5. Drum habe Dank, o Vater Hayden – 6. Adam hat siebn Söhn (F major) – 7. Cato, Plato, Cicero (F major) – 8. Was i beim Tag mit der Leiern gwinn (E minor) – 9. Alleluia (C major)	summer 1810	No. 1: for five voices (MH 577, also K. Anh. C.10.14) – No. 2: for four voices (MH 619 or Hob. XXVIIb:Bb1) – No. 3: for four voices (MH 582) – No. 4: for five voices (MH 584) – No. 5: for nine voices – No. 6: for four voices (MH 699, also K. 562b) – No. 7: (MH 714) – No. 8: (MH 723) – No. 9: for four voices (K. 553)
	Anh. III/2				Schubert's copy of Roser's Die Teilung der Erde	Nehmt hin die Welt! rief Zeus aus seinen Höhen	c. 1810	Text by Schiller; Also Hob. XXVIa:C1
	Anh. III/3				Schubert's copy of part of Mozart's Symphony No. 41	C major	after 29/3/1813	Start of Minuet (3rd movement)
	Anh. III/4				Schubert's copy of a canon from Zumsteeg's Elbondocani	Hoffnung Kind des Himmels	before fall 1813?	Text by Haug (transl. from French); For sstb and piano
	Anh. III/5				Schubert's copy of Zumsteeg's Chor der Derwische	Ein Gott, ein wahrer Gott ist nur	spring 1813?	Text by Iffland, from Achmet und Zenide; for ttb
85	Anh. III/6				Schubert's copy of Preindl's Offertory "Clamavi ad te", Op. 16	C major	November; 1813?	Only the start of the s part is extant in Schubert's copy
	Anh. III/7				Schubert's copy of Reichardt's Monolog aus Goethe's Iphigenie	Heraus in eure Schatten	1815	Text by Goethe, from Iphigenia in Tauris; For voice, women's choir and piano
	Anh. III/8				Schubert's copy of part of Beethoven's Symphony No. 4	B♭ major	1821 or later	Start of Adagio, Allegro vivace (1st movement)
	Anh. III/9				Schubert's copy of the organ part of M. Haydn's Deutsches Hochamt, MH 560	Hier liegt vor deiner Majestät; B♭ major	?	Text by Kohlbrenner; For SATB and organ; Schubert's autograph lost
	Anh. III/10				Schubert's copy of Preindl's Mass in C major	C major Kyrie – Gloria – Credo – Sanctus & Benedictus – Agnus Dei	1821 or later	Text: Mass ordinary (Schubert's settings: D 24E, 31, 45, 49, 56, 66, 105, 167, 324, 452, 678, 755 and 950); For SATB and orchestra; Copied by Schubert and his brother Ferdinand
92	Anh. III/11				Schubert's copy of a canon by Mozart, K. 440d (formerly K. Anh. 134), after K. 410/484d	Laß immer in der Jugend Glanz	?	For two voices; Schubert's autograph lost
127	Anh. III/12				Schubert's copy of a canon by Mozart, K. 230/382b	Selig, selig alle, die im Herrn entschliefen!	?	Text by Hölty; For two voices; Schubert's autograph lost
	Anh. III/13				Schubert's copy of Beethoven's Abendlied unterm gestirnten Himmel, WoO 150	Wenn die Sonne niedersinket	after March 1820	Text by Goeble; Schubert's autograph transposed, incomplete

== Not in the Deutsch catalogue ==
The New Schubert Edition mentions several compositions without a Deutsch number (D deest), most of them lost or fragmentary:

- Song for voice and piano, improvised for a play, possibly identical to D 284 (1815?, lost?)
- "Seliges Genügen", on a text by Johanna Claudine von Ziglowski (date unknown, lost)
- Song, fragment for voice and piano (c. 1827, lost)
- Fragment without text for vocal soloists, choir and orchestra (date unknown)
- "doch stärker ist die Mutterliebe", fragment for voice and orchestra (date unknown, lost)
- Overture for orchestra (date unknown, lost)
- String Quartet in B-flat major (1816, lost)
- Fantasy for string quartet (1813, lost)
- String Sextet, fragment for three violins, viola, cello and double bass (date unknown, lost)
- Fugue for piano duet (1813, lost)
- "Lieder für das Pianoforte": songs for voice and/or piano (unknown date, lost)
- Minuet for piano? (1813?, sketch)
- Canon a trè: fragment of a canon for three voices (1816?)
- Canon in C major for five voices (1826?)
- Three 2-part imitation exercises in invertible counterpoint (1828)

== Sources ==
Multi-volume editions, websites and catalogues

- Alte Gesamt-Ausgabe (AGA) = Franz Schubert's Works: Schubert, Franz (1884–1897). Johannes Brahms; Ignaz Brüll; Anton Door; Julius Epstein; Johann Nepomuk Fuchs; Josef Gänsbacher; Joseph Hellmesberger Sr.; Eusebius Mandyczewski (eds.). Franz Schubert's Werke: Kritisch durchgesehene Gesammtausgabe (in German). Leipzig: Breitkopf & Härtel. Reprints of several volumes by Kalmus and Dover Publications; Franz Schubert's Werke (Series I–XIX and XXI), Series XX, Revisionsbericht: Scores at the International Music Score Library Project
- Deutsch catalogue (D) = Schubert Thematic Catalogue:
  - Deutsch, Otto Erich; et al. (Donald R. Wakeling) (1951). Schubert: Thematic Catalogue of all his Works in Chronological Order (1st ed.). London: Dent. 1995 reprint, with errata correction: Deutsch, Otto Erich; et al. (Donald R. Wakeling) (1995). The Schubert Thematic Catalogue (Dover ed.). Mineola, N.Y.: Dover Publications. ISBN 0486286851.
  - Deutsch, Otto Erich (1978). Walther Dürr; Arnold Feil; Christa Landon [in German]; Werner Aderhold (eds.). Franz Schubert: Thematisches Verzeichnis seiner Werke in chronologischer Folge. New Schubert Edition (in German). Kassel: Bärenreiter. ISBN 9783761805718. ISMN 9790006305148.
    - Series VIII (Supplement)
    - Volume 4
- Hoboken catalogue (Hob.): "Joseph Haydn (1732–1809): Werke sortiert nach Hob (Hoboken-Verzeichnis, 1957-78)" (in German). Kaiserslautern: Klassika.
- Köchel catalogue (K.): "Wolfgang Amadeus Mozart (1756–1791): Werke sortiert nach KV^{6} (Köchel-Verzeichnis, 6. Auflage, 1964)" (in German). Kaiserslautern: Klassika.
- Neue Schubert-Ausgabe (NSA) = New Schubert Edition:
  - NSA scores: Schubert, Franz (1968–2019). International Schubert Association (Tübingen) (ed.). Franz Schubert (1797–1828): New Edition of the Complete Works (in German). Kassel: Bärenreiter. [over 80 volumes in eight series] Individual volumes:
    - NSA II, 15: Schubert, Franz; Neumann, Johann Philipp (2008). Jahrmärker, Manuela; Aigner, Thomas (eds.). Sacontala. New Schubert Edition (in German). Kassel: Bärenreiter. ISMN 9790006497294.
      - Series II (Stage Works), Vol. 15
    - NSA VIII, 4: See above Deutsch (1978)
  - NSA website: "New Schubert Edition". Tübingen: International Schubert Association.
- Schubert Online: "www.schubert-online.at: Schubert music manuscripts, first and early editions online". Vienna: Austrian Academy of Sciences (ÖAW).
- The LiederNet Archive: Ezust, Emily; et al. (LiederNet contributors). "Composer: Franz Peter Schubert (1797 - 1828)". Ontario: LiederNet Corporation.

Other

- Badura-Skoda, Eva; Branscombe, Peter, eds. (2008). Schubert Studies: Problems of Style and Chronology. Cambridge University Press. ISBN 0521088720.
  - Walther Dürr "Schubert's Songs and Their Poetry" pp. 1–24
  - Rufus Hallmark "Schubert's 'Auf dem Strom'" pp. 25–46
  - Elaine Brody "Schubert and Sulzer Revisited" pp. 47–60
  - Marius Flothuis "Schubert Revises Schubert" pp. 61–84
  - Elizabeth Norman McKay "Schubert as Composer of Operas" pp. 85–104
  - Peter Branscombe "Schubert and the Melodrama" pp. 105–142
  - Christoph Wolff "Schubert's 'Der Tod und dad Mädchen'" pp. 143–172
  - Peter Gülke on String Quintet D 956 pp. 173–186
  - Paul Badura-Skoda on Schubert's 'Great' C major Symphony pp. 187–208
  - Robert Winter "Paper Studies and the Future of Schubert Research" pp. 209–276
  - Eva Badura-Skoda "The Chronology of Schubert's Piano Trios" pp. 277–296
  - Reinhard Van Hoorickx "The Chronology of Schubert's Fragments and Sketches" pp. 297–326
  - Arnold Feil "Rhythm in Schubert" pp. 327–346
  - Alexander Weinmann on Leopold Puschl and Schubert's sojourn in Zseliz pp. 347–356
- Elsholz, Gunter (1982). Vogel, Reimut (ed.). Franz Schubert: Sinfonie in E-Dur 1825. Stuttgart: Goldoni. ISBN 3922044050. OCLC 987719669.
- Hilmar, Ernst; Jestremski, Margret, eds. (2004). Schubert-Enzyklopädie (in German). Vol. 1. Introduction by Alfred Brendel. Tutzing: Hans Schneider. ISBN 3795211557.
- Keefe, Simon P., ed. (2006). Mozart Studies. Cambridge University Press. ISBN 0521851025.
- Kube, Michael (2009). "Franz Schuberts Deutsche Trauermesse (D 621) als Problem der Text- und Stilkritik". In Mitterauer, Gertraud; Müller, Ulrich; Springeth, Margarete; Vitzthum, Verena (eds.). Was ist Textkritik?: Zur Geschichte und Relevanz eines Zentralbegriffs der Editionswissenschaft (in German). Walter de Gruyter. pp. 129–140. ISBN 3484970782.
- Mozart, Wolfgang Amadeus; Haydn, Joseph; Haydn, Michael (2008). Kircher, Armin (ed.). Chorbuch Mozart • Haydn VII: Kanonsammlung [Choral Collection Mozart • Haydn, Vol. VII: Canon Collection] (in German, Latin, English, and Italian). Stuttgart: Carus-Verlag. OCLC 274222567.
- Newbould, Brian (1999). Schubert: The Music and the Man. University of California Press. ISBN 0520219570.
- Reed, John (1997). The Schubert Song Companion. Manchester University Press. ISBN 1901341003.
- Van Hoorickx, Reinhard (1971). "Franz Schubert (1797–1828) List of the Dances in Chronological Order". Revue belge de Musicologie / Belgisch Tijdschrift voor Muziekwetenschap. 25 (1). Belgian Musicological Society: 68–97. doi:10.2307/3686180. ISSN 0771-6788. JSTOR 3686180.
- Van Hoorickx, Reinhard (1974–1976). "Thematic Catalogue of Schubert's Works: New Additions, Corrections and Notes". Revue belge de Musicologie / Belgisch Tijdschrift voor Muziekwetenschap. 28–30. Belgian Musicological Society: 136–171. doi:10.2307/3686053. ISSN 0771-6788. JSTOR 3686053.
