= Lübeck (disambiguation) =

Lübeck is a German city.

Lübeck or Lubeck may also refer to:

== Places ==
=== Germany ===
- Free City of Lübeck, an independent city-state, 1226–1937
  - Lübeck law, constitution of a municipal form of government developed at Lübeck after it was made a free city in 1226
- Liubice, also known as Old-Lübeck, predecessor of the modern city of Lübeck
- Prince-Bishopric of Lübeck, 1180–1803, a state of the Holy Roman Empire

==== Groups and places in the modern city of Lübeck ====
- Fachhochschule Lübeck, a university in the city of Lübeck
- Lübeck Academy of Music, higher level music school in Lübeck
- Lübeck Airport, also known as Hamburg Lübeck Airport, located south of Lübeck city centre and northeast of Hamburg. The airport serves the Hamburg Metropolitan Area and is second after Hamburg Airport
- Lübeck Cathedral, a large brick Lutheran cathedral in Lübeck, Germany and part of Lübeck's world heritage
- Theater Lübeck, large theater, formerly Stage of the Hansestadt Lübeck, colloquially Stadttheater
- VfB Lübeck, a German football club playing in Lübeck

=== United States ===
- Lubec, Maine, the easternmost town of the USA
- Lubeck, West Virginia, census-designated place in Wood County

== People ==
- Georg Philipp Schmidt von Lübeck (1766–1849), German poet
- Marja Lubeck (born 1965), New Zealand politician
- Vincent Lübeck (1654–1740), German organist and composer

== Ships ==
- Adler von Lübeck, war galleon during the Northern Seven Years' War
- German frigate Lübeck (F214), a Bremen-class frigate of the German Navy
- German frigate Lübeck (F224), a Köln-class frigate of the German Navy
- Lisa von Lübeck, a reconstruction of a 15th-century caravel
- Lübeck (1844), a corvette of the former German navy; see Battle of Heligoland (1849)
- SMS Lübeck (1903), a Bremen-class cruiser of the German Imperial Navy
