= Das Bild =

Das Bild may refer to

- Bild, a German newspaper
- "Das Bild" (Schubert), a song composed in 1815
