= List of songs by Franz Schubert =

Songs by Austrian composer

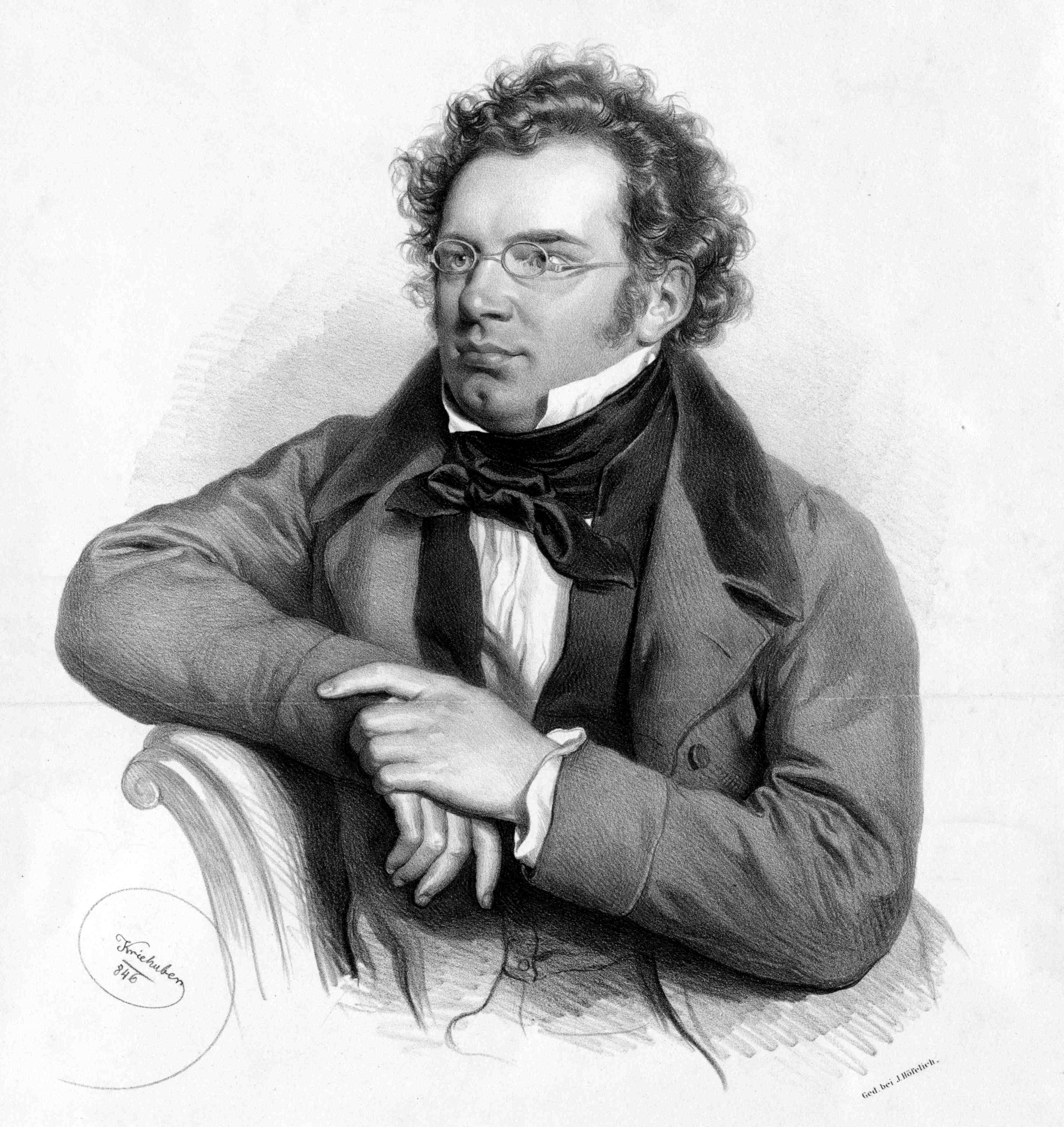
Lithograph of Franz Schubert by Josef Kriehuber (1846)

The following is a list of the complete secular vocal output composed by Franz Schubert (31 January 1797 – 19 November 1828).

It is divided into eleven sections, and attempts to reflect the most current information with regard to Schubert's catalogue. The works contained in this list refer to those found primarily in the following two series of the New Schubert Edition (NSE) edition:

- Series III: Partsongs, Choruses and Cantatas (Mehrstimmige Gesänge)
- Series IV: Songs for solo voice (Lieder)

Note however that some of Schubert's song cycles contain both Lieder and part songs.

The list below includes the following information:

- D. – the catalogue number assigned by Otto Erich Deutsch or NSE authorities
- Genre – the musical genre to which the piece belongs
- Title – the title of the work
- Incipit – the first line(s) of text, as pertaining to vocal works
- Scoring – the instrumentation and/or vocal forces required for the work
- Informal Title – any additional names by which the work is known, when applicable
- Former Deutsch Number – information on Deutsch numbers that have been reassigned, when applicable
- Date – the known or assumed date of composition, when available; or date of publication
- Opus Number – the opus number of the original publication of the work, when applicable
- Setting – the order of setting as it pertains to vocal works that have numerous settings of the same text
- Version – the number of version as it pertains to vocal settings that have more than one existing version
- Notes – any additional information concerning the work: alternate titles, completeness, relation to other works, authorship, etc.

== Part songs ==
Part songs, Series III in the New Schubert Edition (a few in Series IV), or Series XVI–XIX in Franz Schubert's Works (a few in Series XX).

=== Part songs with an opus number ===
==== Part songs published during Schubert's lifetime ====
===== Op. 6 =====
- No. 2 D. 542, Duet "Antigone und Oedip" ['Ihr hohen Himmlischen'] for two voices and piano (1817)

===== Op. 11 =====
- No. 1 D. 598, Quartet "Das Dörfchen" ['Ich rühme mir mein Dörfchen hier'] for two tenors, two basses and piano (1817, 2nd version [formerly D. 641])
- No. 2 D. 724, Quartet "Die Nachtigall" ['Bescheiden verborgen im buschigten Gang'] for two tenors, two basses and piano (1821 or earlier)
- No. 3 D. 747, Quartet "Geist der Liebe" ['Der Abend schleiert Flur und Hain'] for two tenors, two basses and piano (1822, 2nd setting)

===== Op. 16 =====
- No. 1 D. 740, Quartet "Frühlingsgesang" ['Schmücket die Locken'] for two tenors, two basses and piano (1822, 2nd setting)
- No. 2 D. 422, Quartet "Naturgenuß" ['Im Abendschimmer wallt der Quell'] for two tenors, two basses and piano (1822?, 2nd setting)

===== Op. 17 =====
- No. 1 D. 983, Quartet "Jünglingswonne" ['So lang im deutschen Eichentale'] for two tenors and two basses (pub. 1823)
- No. 2 D. 983A, Quartet "Liebe" ['Liebe rauscht der Silberbach'] for two tenors and two basses (pub. 1823)
- No. 3 D. 983B, Quartet "Zum Rundetanz" ['Auf! es dunkelt; silbern funkelt'] for two tenors and two basses (pub. 1823)
- No. 4 D. 983C, Quartet "Die Nacht" ['Wie schön bist du, freundliche Stille'] for two tenors and two basses (pub. 1823)

===== Op. 28 =====
- D. 809, Quartet "Gondelfahrer" ['Es tanzen Mond und Sterne'] for two tenors, two basses and piano (1824, 2nd setting)

===== Op. 52 =====
Sieben Gesänge aus Walter Scotts Fräulein am See

- No. 3 D. 835, Quartet "Bootgesang" ['Triumph, er naht'] for two tenors, two basses and piano (1825)
- No. 4 D. 836, Chorus "Coronach (Totengesang der Frauen und Mädchen)" ['Er ist uns geschieden'] for women's choir and piano, Totengesang der Frauen und Mädchen (1825)

===== Op. 62 =====
- D. 877, Song cycle Gesänge aus "Wilhelm Meister" (1826)

1. "Mignon und der Harfner" ['Nur wer die Sehnsucht kennt'] for two voices and piano (5th setting)

===== Op. 64 =====
- No. 1 D. 825, Quartet "Wehmut" ['Die Abendglocke tönet'] for two tenors and two basses (1826)
- No. 2 D. 825A, Quartet "Ewige Liebe" ['Ertönet, ihr Saiten, in nächtlicher Ruh'] for two tenors and two basses (1826)
- No. 3 D. 825B, Quartet "Flucht" ['In der Freie will ich leben'] for two tenors and two basses (1825)

===== Op. 74 =====
- D. 37, Trio "Die Advokaten" ['Mein Herr, ich komm mich anzufragen'] for two tenors, bass and piano (1812)

===== Op. 81 =====
- No. 3 D. 903, Cantata "Zur guten Nacht" ['Horch auf! Es schlägt die Stunde'] for baritone, men's choir and piano (1827)

===== Op. 102 =====
- D. 875, Quintet "Mondenschein" ['Des Mondes Zauberblume lacht'] for two tenors, three basses and piano (1826)

==== Part songs published posthumously ====
===== Op. posth. 104 =====
- D. 930, Trio "Der Hochzeitsbraten" ['Ach liebes Herz, ach Theobald, laß dir nur diesmal raten'] for soprano, tenor, bass and piano (1827)

===== Op. posth. 111 =====
- No. 1 D. 189, Cantata "An die Freude" ['Freude, schöner Götterfunken'] for voice, unison choir and piano (1815)

===== Op. posth. 112 =====
- No. 1 D. 985, Quartet "Gott im Ungewitter" ['Du Schrecklicher, wer kann vor dir und deinem Donner stehn?'] for soprano, alto, tenor, bass and piano (1815?)
- No. 2 D. 986, Quartet "Gott der Weltschöpfer" ['Zu Gott, zu Gott flieg auf'] for soprano, alto, tenor, bass and piano (1815?)
- No. 3 D. 232, Quartet "Hymne an den Unendlichen" ['Zwischen Himmel und Erd''] for soprano, alto, tenor, bass and piano (1815)

===== Op. posth. 128 =====
- D. 472, Cantata "Kantate zu Ehren von Josef Spendou" for two sopranos, tenor, bass, mixed choir and orchestra (1816, see also D. 470?)

I. Da liegt er, starr
II. Gottes Bild ist Furst und Staat
III. Ein Punkt nur ist der Mensch
IV. Die Sonne sticht

===== Op. posth. 131 =====
- No. 2 D. 148, Cantata "Trinklied" ['Brüder! unser Erdenwallen'] for tenor, men's choir and piano (1815)

===== Op. posth. 133 =====
- D. 757, Quartet "Gott in der Natur" ['Groß ist der Herr!'] for two sopranos, two altos and piano (1822)

===== Op. posth. 134 =====
- D. 892, Cantata "Nachthelle" ['Die Nacht ist heiter'] for tenor solo, two tenors, two basses and piano (1826)

===== Op. posth. 135 =====
- D. 920, Cantata "Ständchen" ['Zögernd leise, in des Dunkels nächt'ger Hülle'] for alto, women's choir and piano, Notturno [formerly D. 921] (1827, 2nd version)

===== Op. posth. 136 =====
- D. 942, Cantata "Mirjams Siegesgesang" ['Rührt die Zimbel, schlagt die Saiten'] for soprano, mixed choir and piano (1828)

I. Rührt die Zimbel, schlagt die Saiten
II. Aus ägypten vor dem Volke
III. Doch der Horizont erdunkelt
IV. S'ist der Herr in seinem Grimme
V. Tauchst du auf, Pharao?
VI. Drum mit Zimbeln und mit Saiten

===== Op. posth. 139 =====
- D. 815, Quartet "Gebet" ['Du Urquell aller Güte'] for soprano, alto, tenor, bass and piano (1824)
- D. 913, Quartet "Nachtgesang im Walde" ['Sei uns stets gegrüßt, o Nacht!'] for two tenors, two basses and four horns (1827)

===== Op. posth. 146 =====
- D. 763, Quartet "Schicksalslenker, blicke nieder" for soprano, alto, tenor, bass and piano, Des Tages Weihe (1822)

===== Op. posth. 151 =====
- D. 912, Chorus "Schlachtlied" ['Mit unserm Arm ist nichts getan'] for double men's choir (1827, 2nd setting)

===== Op. posth. 155 =====
- D. 847, Quartet "Trinklied aus dem 16. Jahrhundert" ['Edit Nonna, edit Clerus'] for two tenors and two basses (1825)

===== Op. posth. 156 =====
- D. 848, Quartet "Nachtmusik" ['Wir stimmen dir mit Flötensang'] for two tenors and two basses (1825)

===== Op. posth. 157 =====
- D. 748, Cantata "Am Geburtstage des Kaisers" ['Steig empor, umblüht von Segen'] for soprano, alto, tenor, bass, mixed choir and orchestra (1822)

===== Op. posth. 158 =====
- D. 666, Cantata "Kantate zum Geburtstag des Sängers Johann Michael Vogl" for soprano, tenor, bass and piano, Der Frühlingsmorgen (1819)

I. Sänger, der von Herzen singet
II. Diese Berge sah'n dich blühen
III. Da saht ihr Orestes scheiden
IV. Gott bewahr' dein teures Leben

===== Op. posth. 167 =====
- D. 714, Octet "Gesang der Geister über den Wassern" ['Des Menschen Seele gleicht dem Wasser'] for four tenors, four basses, two violas, two violoncellos and double bass (1820–1821, 4th setting; 2nd version)

===== Op. posth. 169 =====
- D. 984, Quartet "Der Wintertag" ['In schöner heller Winterzeit ward eine Maid geboren'] for two tenors, two basses and piano, Geburtstaglied (after 1820, fragment; piano part is lost)

=== Part songs with orchestral accompaniment ===
- D. 110, Cantata "Wer ist groß?" ['Wer ist wohl groß?'] for bass, men's choir and orchestra (1814)
- D. 294, Cantata "Namensfeier" ['Erhabner! Verehrter Freund der Jugend!'] for soprano, tenor, bass, choir and orchestra, Namensfeier fur Franz Michael Vierthaler or Gratulations-Kantate (1815)
- D. 451, Cantata "Prometheus" ['Hervor aus Buschen und Baumen'] for soprano, bass, choir and orchestra (1816, lost)
- D. 714, Octet "Gesang der Geister über den Wassern" ['Des Menschen Seele gleicht dem Wasser'] for four tenors, four basses, two violas, two violoncellos and double bass (1820–1821, 4th setting; 1st version [formerly D. 704], sketch)
- D. 954, Cantata "Glaube, Hoffnung und Liebe" ['Gott, laß die Glocke glücklich steigen']; version for two tenors, two basses, mixed choir, two oboes, two clarinets, two bassoons, two horns and two trombones (1828)

=== Part songs for mixed ensemble ===
==== Part songs for mixed ensemble and piano ====
- D. 47, Cantata "Dithyrambe" ['Nimmer, das glaubt mir, erscheinen die Götter'] for tenor, bass, mixed choir and piano (1813, 1st setting; fragment)
- D. 126, Duet "Szene aus Faust" ['Wie anders, Gretchen, war dir's'] for two voices and piano (1814, 1st anD. 2nd versions; also possible as a Cantata for voice, choir and piano; or as a Cantata for two voices, choir and piano)
- D. 168, Chorus "Nun laßt uns den Leib begraben" ['Begrabt den Leib in seiner Gruft'] for mixed choir and piano, Begräbnislied (1815)
- D. 168A, Chorus "Jesus Christus unser Heiland, der den Tod überwand" ['Überwunden hat der Herr den Tod!'] for mixed choir and piano, Osterlied [formerly D. 987] (1815)
- D. 236, Trio "Das Abendrot" ['Der Abend blüht, der Westen glüht!'] for two sopranos, bass and piano (1815)
- D. 249, Cantata "Die Schlacht" ['Schwer und dumpfig'] for unspecified voices/instruments (1815, 1st setting; sketch)
- D. 352, Duet "Licht und Liebe" ['Liebe ist ein süßes Licht'] for soprano, tenor and piano, Nachtgesang (1816?)
- D. 387, Cantata "Die Schlacht" ['Schwer und dumpfig'] for unspecified soloists, choir and piano (1816, 2nd setting; sketch)
- D. 439, Quartet "An die Sonne" ['O Sonne, Königin der Welt'] for soprano, alto, tenor, bass and piano (1816)
- D. 609, Quartet "Die Geselligkeit" ['Wer Lebenslust fühlet'] for soprano, alto, tenor, bass and piano, Lebenslust (1818, 2nd part of the 1st verse, "im traulichen Kreise" was formerly D. 665)
- D. 642, Quartet "Viel tausend Sterne prangen" ['Viel tausend Sterne prangen'] for soprano, alto, tenor, bass and piano (1812?)
- D. 725, Duet "Linde Weste wehen" for mezzo-soprano, tenor and piano (1821, fragment)
- D. 826, Quartet "Der Tanz" ['Es redet und träumet die Jugend so viel'] for soprano, alto, tenor, bass and piano (1828)
- D. 875A, Chorus "Die Allmacht" ['Groß ist Jehova der Herr!'] for mixed choir and piano (1826, 2nd setting; sketch)
- D. 920, Cantata "Ständchen" ['Zögernd leise, in des Dunkels nächt'ger Hülle'] for alto, men's choir and piano, Notturno (1827, 1st version)
- D. 936, Cantata "Kantate für Irene Kiesewetter" ['Al par del ruscelletto chiaro'] for two tenors, two basses, mixed choir and piano duet (1827, also appears as "Kantate zur Feier der Genesung der Irene Kiesewetter")
- D. 954, Cantata "Glaube, Hoffnung und Liebe" ['Gott, laß die Glocke glücklich steigen']; version for two tenors, two basses, mixed choir and piano (1828)
- D Anh. I,24, Cantata "Kantate auf den Vater" ['?'] for unknown voices and piano (?) (1816, lost)

==== Part songs for mixed ensemble a cappella ====
- D. 329A, Canon "Das Grab" ['Das Grab ist tief und stille'] for mixed choir (1815, 1st setting; sketch)
- D. 440, Chorus "Chor der Engel" ['Christ ist erstanden'] for mixed choir (1816)
- D. 643A, Quartet "Das Grab" ['Das Grab ist tief und stille'] for soprano, alto, tenor and bass (1819, 5th setting)

=== Part songs for only male or only female voices ===
==== Part songs for male or female ensemble and piano ====
- D. 169, Chorus "Trinklied vor der Schlacht" ['Schlacht, du brichst an!'] for double unison choir and piano (1815)
- D. 170, Cantata "Schwertlied" ['Du Schwert an meiner Linken'] for voice, unison choir and piano (1815)
- D. 183, Cantata "Trinklied" ['Ihr Freunde und du gold'ner Wein'] for voice, unison choir and piano (1815)
- D. 330, Chorus "Das Grab" ['Das Grab ist tief und stille'] for unison choir and piano (1815, 2nd setting; scoring also possible for choir and piano)
- D. 442, Chorus "Das große Halleluja" ['Ehre sei dem Hocherhabnen']; version for choir and piano (1816)
- D. 443, Chorus "Schlachtlied" ['Mit unserm Arm ist nichts getan']; version for choir and piano, Schlachtgesang (1816, 1st setting)
- D. 521, Chorus "Jagdlied" ['Trarah! Trarah! Wir kehren daheim']; version for unison choir and piano (1817)
- D. 542, Duet "Antigone und Oedip" ['Ihr hohen Himmlischen'] for two voices and piano (1817, modified version with changes by Johann Michael Vogl)
- D. 545, Duet "Der Jüngling und der Tod" ['Die Sonne sinkt, o könnt ich'] for two voices and piano (1817, 1st version)

==== Part songs for male or female ensemble a cappella ====
- D. 61, Canon "Ein jugendlicher Maienschwung" ['Ein jugendlicher Maienschwung'] for three voices (1813)
- D. 69, Canon "Dreifach ist der Schritt der Zeit (Spruch des Konfuzius)" ['Dreifach ist der Schritt der Zeit'] for three voices (1813, 2nd setting)
- D. 130, Canon "Der Schnee Zerrinnt" ['Der Schnee zerrinnt, der Mai beginnt'] for three voices (1815?, 1st setting)
- D. 131, Canon "Lacrimoso son io" ['Lacrimoso son io'] for three voices (1815?, 1st anD. 2nd versions; 2nd version titled "Lacrimosa son io" ['Lacrimosa son io'])
- D. 199, Duet "Mailied" ['Grüner wird die Au']; version for two voices (1815, 2nd setting)
- D. 202, Duet "Mailied" ['Der Schnee zerrinnt, der Mai beginnt']; version for two voices (1815; 2nd setting of D. 130, with a different title)
- D. 203, Duet "Der Morgenstern" ['Stern der Liebe, Glanzgebilde!']; version for two voices (1815, 2nd setting)
- D. 204, Duet "Jägerlied" ['Frisch auf, ihr Jäger']; version for two voices (1815)
- D. 205, Duet "Lützows wilde Jagd" ['Was glänzt dort vom Walde im Sonnenschein?']; version for two voices (1815)
- D. 244, Canon "Willkommen, lieber schöner Mai" ['Willkommen, lieber schöner Mai'] for three voices (1815?, 1st anD. 2nd versions)
- D. 253, Duet "Punschlied. Im Norden zu singen" ['Auf der Berge freien Höhen'] for two voices (1815, 2nd version)
- D. 357, Canon "Gold'ner Schein" ['Gold'ner Schein, deckt den Hain'] for three voices (1816)
- D. 873, Canon ["?"] ['?'] in A major for six voices (1826?, sketch without text)
- D. 988, Canon "Liebe säuseln die Blätter" ['Liebe säuseln die Blätter'] for three voices (1815?)
- D deest, Canon "Canon a trè" ['?'] in B-flat major for three voices (1816? fragment)
- D deest, Trio "?" ['?'] in D major for unspecified voices (date unknown, fragment without text)

==== Part songs for male ensemble and piano ====
- D. 75, Cantata "Trinklied" ['Freunde, sammelt euch im Kreise'] for bass, men's choir and piano (1813)
- D. 140, Trio "Klage um Ali Bey" ['Laßt mich! Laßt mich! Ich will klagen'] for two tenors, bass and piano (1815, 1st version)
- D. 267, Quartet "Trinklied" ['Auf! Jeder sei nun froh und sorgenfrei!'] for two tenors, two basses and piano (1815)
- D. 268, Quartet "Bergknappenlied" ['Hinab, ihr Brüder, in den Schacht!'] for two tenors, two basses and piano (1815)
- D. 269, Trio "Das Leben" ['Das Leben ist ein Traum'] for tenor, two basses and piano (1815, 1st version)
- D. 277, Trio "Punschlied" ['Vier Elemente, inning gesellt'] for two tenors, bass and piano (1815)
- D. 356, Quartet "Trinklied" ['Funkelnd im Becher so helle, so hold'] for two tenors, two basses and piano (1816, fragment)
- D. 513, Quartet "La pastorella al prato" ['La pastorella al prato'] for two tenors, two basses and piano, La Pastorella (1817?, 1st setting)
- D. 569, Chorus "Das Grab" ['Das Grab ist tief und stille'] for unison men's choir and piano (1817, 4th setting)
- D. 705, Quartet "Gesang der Geister über den Wassern" ['Des Menschen Seele gleicht dem Wasser'] for two tenors, two basses and piano (1820, 3rd setting; sketch)
- D. 710, Quartet "Im Gegenwärtigen Vergangenes" ['Ros und Lilie morgentaulich'] for two tenors, two basses and piano (1821?)
- D. 822, Cantata "Lied eines Kriegers" ['Des stolzen Männerlebens schönste Zeichen'] for bass, unison men's choir and piano (1824)
- D. 865, Quartet "Widerspruch" ['Wenn ich durch Busch und Zweig'] for two tenors, two basses and piano (1828, 1st version)

==== Part song for male ensemble and guitar ====
- D. 80, Trio "Zur Namensfeier meines Vaters" ['Ertöne, Leier, zur Festesfeier!'] for two tenors, bass and guitar (1813)

==== Part songs for male ensemble a cappella ====
- D. 38, Trio "Totengräberlied" ['Grabe, Spaten, grabe!'] for two tenors and bass (1813?, 1st setting)
- D. 43, Trio "Dreifach ist der Schritt der Zeit (Spruch des Konfuzius)" ['Dreifach ist der Schritt der Zeit'] for two tenors and bass (1813, 1st setting)
- D. 51, Trio "Unendliche Freude durchwallet das Herz" ['Unendliche Freude durchwallet das Herz'] for two tenors and bass (1813, 1st setting)
- D. 53, Trio "Vorüber die stöhnende Klage" ['Vorüber, vorüber die stöhnende Klage'] for two tenors and bass (1813)
- D. 54, Canon "Unendliche Freude durchwallet das Herz" ['Unendliche Freude durchwallet das Herz'] for three basses (1813, 2nd setting)
- D. 55, Trio "Selig durch die Liebe" ['Selig durch die Liebe Götter'] for two tenors and bass (1813)
- D. 57, Trio "Hier strecket der wallende Pilger" ['Hier strecket der wallende Pilger'] for two tenors and bass (1813)
- D. 58, Trio "Dessen Fahne Donnerstürme wallte" ['Dessen Fahne Donnerstürme wallte'] for two tenors and bass (1813)
- D. 60, Trio "Hier umarmen sich getreue Gatten" ['Hier umarmen sich getreue Gatten'] for two tenors and bass (1813)
- D. 62, Trio "Thronend auf erhabnem Sitz" ['Thronend auf erhabnem Sitz'] for two tenors and bass (1813)
- D. 63, Trio "Wer die steile Sternenbahn" ['Wer die steile Sternenbahn'] for two tenors and bass (1813)
- D. 64, Trio "Majestät'sche Sonnenrosse" ['Majestät'sche Sonnenrosse'] for two tenors and bass (1813)
- D. 65, Canon "Schmerz verzerret ihr Gesicht" ['Schmerz verzerret ihr Gesicht'] for two tenors and bass (1813, sketch)
- D. 67, Trio "Frisch atmet des Morgens lebendiger Hauch" ['Frisch atmet des Morgens lebendiger Hauch'] for two tenors and bass (1813)
- D. 70, Trio "Dreifach ist der Schritt der Zeit (Spruch des Konfuzius)" ['Dreifach ist der Schritt der Zeit'] for two tenors and bass (1813, 3rd setting; fragment)
- D. 71, Trio "Die zwei Tugendwege" ['Zwei sind der Wege'] for two tenors and bass (1813)
- D. 88, Canon "Verschwunden sind die Schmerzen" ['Verschwunden sind die Schmerzen'] for two tenors and bass (1813)
- D. 129, Trio "Mailied" ['Grüner wird die Au und der Himmel'] for two tenors and bass (1815?, 1st setting)
- D. 147, Trio "Bardengesang" ['Rolle, du strömigter Carun'] for two tenors and bass (1816?)
- D. 242, Trio "Trinklied im Winter" ['Das Glas gefüllt!'] for two tenors and bass (1815, 1st setting; D deest is the 2nd setting, with a different title)
- D. 243, Trio "Frühlingslied" ['Die Luft ist blau, das Tal ist grün'] for two tenors and bass (1815, 1st setting)
- D. 331, Quartet "Der Entfernten" ['Wohl denk' ich allenthalben'] for two tenors and two basses (ca. 1816, 1st setting; setting identical to the one originally catalogued as D. 332)
- D. 337, Quartet "Die Einsiedelei" ['Es rieselt klar und wehend ein Quell'] for two tenors and two basses (ca. 1816, 1st setting)
- D. 338, Quartet "An den Frühling" ['Willkommen, schöner Jüngling!'] for two tenors and two basses (ca. 1816, 2nd setting)
- D. 364, Quartet "Fischerlied" ['Das Fischergewerbe gibt rüstigen Mut'] for two tenors and two basses (1816 or 1817?, 2nd setting)
- D. 377, Chorus "Das Grab" ['Das Grab ist tief und stille'] for men's choir and piano (1816, 3rd setting)
- D. 407, Cantata "Beitrag zur fünfzigjährigen Jubelfeier des Herrn von Salieri" for two tenors, two basses and piano (1816)

I. Quartet "Gütigster, Bester! Weisester Größter!" for two tenors and two basses (1st anD. 2nd settings; 2nd setting [formerly D. 441] for two tenors, bass and piano)
II. Aria "So Güt' als Weisheit strömen mild" for tenor and piano
III. Canon "Unser aller Großpapa, bleibe noch recht lange da" for three voices

- D. 423, Trio "Andenken" ['Ich denke dein, wenn durch den Hain'] for two tenors and bass (1816, 2nd setting)
- D. 424, Trio "Erinnerungen" ['Am Seegestad, in lauen Vollmondnächten'] for two tenors and bass (1816, 2nd setting)
- D. 425, Trio "Lebenslied" ['Kommen und scheiden, suchen und meiden'] for two tenors and bass (1816, lost; see also D Anh. I,23)
- D. 426, Trio "Trinklied (Herr Bacchus ist ein braver Mann)" ['Herr Bacchus ist ein braver Mann'] for two tenors and bass (1816, lost)
- D. 427, Trio "Trinklied im Mai" ['Bekränzet die Tonnen'] for two tenors and bass (1816)
- D. 428, Trio "Widerhall" ['Auf ewig dein, wenn Berg und Meere trennen'] for two tenors and bass (1816)
- D. 494, Quintet "Der Geistertanz" ['Die bretterne Kammer der Toten erbebt'] for two tenors and three basses (1816, 4th setting)
- D. 538, Quartet "Gesang der Geister über den Wassern" ['Des Menschen Seele gleicht dem Wasser'] for two tenors and two basses (1817, 2nd setting)
- D. 572, Quartet "Lied im Freien" ['Wie schön ist's im Freien'] for two tenors and two basses (1817)
- D. 598, Quartet "Das Dörfchen" ['Ich rühme mir mein Dörfchen hier'] for two tenors and two basses (1817, 1st version; sketch without a piano part)
- D. 635, Quartet "Leise, leise laßt uns singen" ['Leise, leise laßt uns singen'] for two tenors and two basses, Ruhe (1819)
- D. 656, Quintet "Sehnsucht" ['Nur wer die Sehnsucht kennt'] for two tenors and three basses (1819, 4th setting)
- D. 657, Quartet "Ruhe, schönstes Glück der Erde" ['Ruhe, schönstes Glück der Erde'] for two tenors and two basses (1819)
- D. 709, Quartet "Frühlingsgesang" ['Schmücket die Locken mit duftigen Kränzen'] for two tenors and two basses (before 1822, 1st setting)
- D. 778B, Quartet "Ich hab' in mich gesogen" ['Ich hab' in mich gesogen den Frühling treu und lieb'] for two tenors and two basses (1827?, sketch)
- D. 873A, Quartet "Nachklänge" ['?'] for two tenors and two basses (?) (1826?, sketch without text)
- D. 893, Quartet "Grab und Mond" ['Silberblauer Mondenschein fällt herab'] for two tenors and two basses (1826)
- D. 901, Quartet "Wein und Liebe" ['Liebchen und der Saft der Reben'] for two tenors and two basses (1827)
- D. 914, Quartet "Frühlingslied" ['Geöffnet sind des Winters Riegel'] for two tenors and two basses (1827, 1st setting)
- D. 916, Quartet "Das stille Lied" ['Schweige nur, süßer Mund'] for two tenors and two basses (1827, sketch)
- D Anh. I,18, Trio or Quartet "Lied beim Rundetanz" ['Auf, es dunkelt, silbern funkelt'] for two tenors and bass or two tenors and two basses [formerly D. 132] (1815 or 1816, fragment)
- D Anh. I,19, Trio or Quartet "Lied im Freien" ['Wie schön ist's im Freien'] for two tenors and bass or two tenors and two basses [formerly D. 133] (1815 or 1816, fragment)
- D Anh. I,20, Trio or Quartet "Amors Macht" ['Wo Amors Flügel weben'] for two tenors and bass or two tenors and two basses [formerly D. 339] (1815 or 1816, fragment)
- D Anh. I,21, Trio or Quartet "Badelied" ['Zur Elbe, zur Elbe, des Äthers Gewölbe'] for two tenors and bass or two tenors and two basses [formerly D. 340] (1815 or 1816, fragment)
- D Anh. I,22, Trio or Quartet "Sylphen" ['Was unterm Monde gleicht uns Sylphen flink und leicht'] for two tenors and bass or two tenors and two basses [formerly D. 341] (1815 or 1816, fragment)
- D Anh. I,23, Trio or Quartet "Lebenslied" ['Kommen und scheiden, suchen und meiden'] for two tenors and bass or two tenors and two basses (1815 or 1816, fragment; see also D. 425)

==== Part songs for female ensemble and piano ====
- D. 140, Chorus "Klage um Ali Bey" ['Laßt mich! Laßt mich! Ich will klagen'] for women's choir and piano (1815, 1st version)
- D. 269, Trio "Das Leben" ['Das Leben ist ein Traum'] for two sopranos, alto and piano (1815, 2nd version)

== Lieder ==
Lieder for a single voice soloist as included in Series IV of the New Schubert Edition and/or Series XX of Franz Schubert's Works. Note however that these editions include a few Part songs characterized as Lied.

=== Lieder with an opus number ===
==== Lieder published during Schubert's lifetime ====
===== Op. 1 – "Erlkönig" =====
- D. 328, Song "Erlkönig" ['Wer reitet so spät durch Nacht und Wind?'] for voice and piano (1815, 4th version). Lyrics by Johann Wolfgang von Goethe.

===== Op. 2 – "Gretchen am Spinnrade" =====
- D. 118, Song "Gretchen am Spinnrade" ['Meine Ruh' ist hin, mein Herz ist schwer'] for voice and piano (1814). Lyrics by Johann Wolfgang von Goethe.

===== Op. 3 =====
- No. 1 D. 121, Song "Schäfers Klagelied" ['Da droben auf jenem Berge'] for voice and piano (1814, 1st version). Lyrics by Johann Wolfgang von Goethe.
- No. 2 D. 216, Song "Meeres Stille" ['Tiefe Stille herrscht im Wasser'] for voice and piano (1815, 2nd setting). Lyrics by Johann Wolfgang von Goethe.
- No. 3 D. 257, Song "Heidenröslein" ['Sah ein Knab' ein Röslein stehn'] for voice and piano (1815). Lyrics by Johann Wolfgang von Goethe.
- No. 4 D. 368, Song "Jägers Abendlied" ['Im Felde schleich' ich still und wild'] for voice and piano (1816?, 2nd setting). Lyrics by Johann Wolfgang von Goethe.

===== Op. 4 =====
- No. 1 D. 489, Song "Der Wanderer" ['Ich komme vom Gebirge her'] for voice and piano, Der Unglückliche (1816, 3rd version [formerly D. 493]). Lyrics by Schmidt von Lübeck.
- No. 2 D. 685, Song "Morgenlied" ['Eh' die Sonne früh aufersteht'] for voice and piano (1820). Lyrics by Werner.
- No. 3 D. 224, Song "Wandrers Nachtlied I" ['Der du von dem Himmel bist'] for voice and piano (1815). Lyrics by Johann Wolfgang von Goethe.

===== Op. 5 =====
- No. 1 D. 138, Song "Rastlose Liebe" ['Dem Schnee, dem Regen, dem Wind entgegen'] for voice and piano (1815, 1st version). Lyrics by Johann Wolfgang von Goethe.
- No. 2 D. 162, Song "Nähe des Geliebten" ['Ich denke dein, wenn mir der Sonne Schimmer'] for voice and piano (1815, 2nd version). Lyrics by Johann Wolfgang von Goethe.
- No. 3 D. 225, Song "Der Fischer" ['Das Wasser rauscht', das Wasser schwoll'] for voice and piano (1815, 2nd version). Lyrics by Johann Wolfgang von Goethe.
- No. 4 D. 226, Song "Erster Verlust" ['Ach, wer bringt die schönen Tage'] for voice and piano (1815). Lyrics by Johann Wolfgang von Goethe.
- No. 5 D. 367, Song "Der König in Thule" ['Es war ein König in Thule'] for voice and piano (1816). Lyrics by Johann Wolfgang von Goethe.

===== Op. 6 =====
- No. 1 D. 541, Song "Memnon" ['Den Tag hindurch nur einmal mag ich sprechen'] for voice and piano (1817). Lyrics by Johann Mayrhofer.
- No. 3 D. 504, Song "Am Grabe Anselmos" ['Daß ich dich verloren habe'] for voice and piano (1816, 1st version). Lyrics by Claudius.

===== Op. 7 =====
- No. 1 D. 514, Song "Die abgeblühte Linde" ['Wirst du halten, was du schwurst'] for voice and piano (1817?). Lyrics by Széchénye.
- No. 2 D. 515, Song "Der Flug der Zeit" ['Es floh die Zeit im Wirbelfluge'] for voice and piano (1817?). Lyrics by Széchénye.
- No. 3 D. 531, Song "Der Tod und das Mädchen" ['Vorüber, ach vorüber'] for voice and piano (1817). Lyrics by Claudius.

===== Op. 8 =====
- No. 1 D. 702, Song "Der Jüngling auf dem Hügel" ['Ein Jüngling auf dem Hügel'] for voice and piano (1820). Lyrics by H. Hüttenbrenner.
- No. 2 D. 516, Song "Sehnsucht" ['Der Lerche wolkennahe Lieder'] for voice and piano (1816?). Lyrics by Johann Mayrhofer.
- No. 3 D. 586, Song "(Am) Erlafsee" ['Mir ist so wohl, so weh''] for voice and piano (1817). Lyrics by Johann Baptist Mayrhofer.
- No. 4 D. 539, Song "Am Strome" ['Ist mir's doch, als sei mein Leben'] for voice and piano (1817). Lyrics by Johann Baptist Mayrhofer.

===== Op. 12 – Gesänge des Harfners aus "Wilhelm Meister" =====
Lyrics by Johann Wolfgang von Goethe.

- D. 478, Song cycle Gesänge des Harfners aus "Wilhelm Meister" for voice and piano (1822)

1. "Wer sich der Einsamkeit ergibt", Harfenspieler I (1822?, 2nd setting; 2nd version)
2. "Wer nie sein Brot mit Tränen aß", Harfenspieler III [formerly D. 480] (1822, 3rd setting)
3. "An die Türen will ich schleichen", Harfenspieler II [formerly D. 479] (1822?, 2nd version)

===== Op. 13 =====
- No. 1 D. 517, Song "Der Schäfer und der Reiter" ['Ein Schäfer saß im Grünen'] for voice and piano (1817). Lyrics by Fouqué.
- No. 2 D. 711, Song "Lob der Tränen" ['Laue Lüfte, Blumendüfte'] for voice and piano (1818?, 2nd version). Lyrics by A. W. Schlegel.
- No. 3 D. 524, Song "Der Alpenjäger" ['Auf hohen Bergesrücken'] for voice and piano (1817, 3rd version). Lyrics by Johann Mayrhofer.

===== Op. 14 =====
- No. 1 D. 720, Song "Suleika I" ['Was bedeutet die Bewegung?'] for voice and piano (1821, 2nd version). Lyrics by Johann Wolfgang von Goethe.
- No. 2 D. 719, Song "Geheimes" ['Über meines Liebchens Äugeln'] for voice and piano (1821). Lyrics by Johann Wolfgang von Goethe.

===== Op. 19 =====
- No. 1 D. 369, Song "An Schwager Kronos" ['Spute dich, Kronos!'] for voice and piano (1816). Lyrics by Johann Wolfgang von Goethe.
- No. 2 D. 161, Song "An Mignon" ['Über Tal und Fluß getragen'] for voice and piano (1815, 2nd version). Lyrics by Johann Wolfgang von Goethe.
- No. 3 D. 544, Song "Ganymed" ['Wie im Morgenglanze'] for voice and piano (1817). Lyrics by Johann Wolfgang von Goethe.

===== Op. 20 =====
- No. 1 D. 741, Song "Sei mir gegrüßt" ['O du Entriß'ne mir'] for voice and piano (1821–1822). Lyrics by Rückert.
- No. 2 D. 686, Song "Frühlingsglaube" ['Die linden Lüfte sind erwacht'] for voice and piano (1820, 3rd version). Lyrics by Uhland.
- No. 3 D. 552, Song "Hänflings Liebeswerbung" ['Ahidi! ich liebe'] for voice and piano (1817, 2nd version). Lyrics by Friedrich Kind.

===== Op. 21 =====
- No. 1 D. 553, Song "Auf der Donau" ['Auf der Wellen Spiegel'] for bass and piano (1817). Lyrics by Johann Mayrhofer.
- No. 2 D. 536, Song "Der Schiffer" ['Im winde, im Sturme'] for bass and piano (1817?, 2nd version). Lyrics by Johann Mayrhofer.
- No. 3 D. 525, Song "Wie Ulfru fischt" ['Der Angel zuckt, die Rute bebt'] for bass and piano (1817, 2nd version). Lyrics by Johann Mayrhofer.

===== Op. 22 =====
- No. 1 D. 771, Song "Der Zwerg" ['Im trüben Licht verschwinden schon die Berge'] for voice and piano (1822?). Lyrics by M. von Collin.
- No. 2 D. 772, Song "Wehmut" ['Wenn ich durch Wald und Fluren geh''] for voice and piano (1822 or 1823?). Lyrics by M. von Collin.

===== Op. 23 =====
- No. 1 D. 751, Song "Die Liebe hat gelogen" ['Die Liebe hat gelogen, die Sorge lastet schwer'] for voice and piano (1822). Lyrics by Platen.
- No. 2 D. 743, Song "Selige Welt" ['Ich treibe auf des Lebens Meer'] for bass and piano (1822?). Lyrics by Senn.
- No. 3 D. 744, Song "Schwanengesang" ['Wie klag' ich's aus das Sterbegefühl'] for voice and piano (1822?). Lyrics by Senn.
- No. 4 D. 761, Song "Schatzgräbers Begehr" ['In tiefster Erde ruht ein alt Gesetz'] for voice and piano (1822, 2nd version). Lyrics by Schober.

===== Op. 24 =====
- No. 1 D. 583, Song "Gruppe aus dem Tartarus" ['Horch, wie Murmeln des empörten Meeres'] for voice and piano (1817, 2nd setting). Lyrics by Schiller.
- No. 2 D. 527, Song "Schlaflied" ['Es mahnt der Wald, es ruft der Strom'] for voice and piano, Abendlied or Schlummerlied (1817, 2nd version). Lyrics by Johann Mayrhofer.

===== Op. 25 – Die schöne Müllerin =====
- D. 795, Song cycle Die schöne Müllerin for voice and piano (1823). Lyrics by Wilhelm Müller.

1. "Das Wandern" ['Das Wandern ist des Müllers Lust']
2. "Wohin?" ['Ich hört' ein Bächlein rauschen']
3. "Halt!" ['Eine Mühle seh' ich blinken']
4. "Danksagung an den Bach" ['War es also gemeint']
5. "Am Feierabend" ['Hätt' ich tausend Arme zu rühren']
6. "Der Neugierige" ['Ich frage keine Blume']
7. "Ungeduld" ['Ich schnitt' es gern in alle Rinden ein']
8. "Morgengruß" ['Guten Morgen, schöne Müllerin']
9. "Des Müllers Blumen" ['Am Bach viel kleine Blumen stehn'']
10. "Tränenregen" ['Wir saßen so traulich beisammen']
11. "Mein!" ['Bächlein, laß dein Rauschen sein']
12. "Pause" ['Meine Laute hab' ich gehängt an die Wand']
13. "Mit dem grünen Lautenbande" ['Schad' um das schöne grüne Band']
14. "Der Jäger" ['Was sucht denn der Jäger']
15. "Eifersucht und Stolz" ['Wohin so schnell']
16. "Die liebe Farbe" ['In Grün will ich mich kleiden']
17. "Die böse Farbe" ['Ich möchte zieh'n in die Welt hinaus']
18. "Trockne Blumen" ['Ihr Blümlein alle']
19. "Der Müller und der Bach" ['Wo ein treues Herze']
20. "Des Baches Wiegenlied" ['Gute Ruh', gute Ruh'']

===== Op. 31 – "Suleika II" =====
- D. 717, Song "Suleika II" ['Ach um deine feuchten Schwingen'] for voice and piano (1821). Lyrics by Johann Wolfgang von Goethe.

===== Op. 32 – "Die Forelle" =====
- D. 550, Song "Die Forelle" ['In einem Bächlein helle'] for voice and piano (1816–1821, 4th version). Lyrics by Christian Daniel Schubart.

===== Op. 36 =====
- No. 1 D. 707, Song "Der zürnenden Diana" ['Ja, spanne nur den Bogen'] for voice and piano (1820, 2nd version)
- No. 2 D. 672, Song "Nachtstück" ['Wenn über Berge sich der Nebel breitet'] for voice and piano (1819, 2nd version)

===== Op. 37 =====
- No. 1 D. 794, Song "Der Pilgrim" ['Noch in meines Lebens Lenze'] for voice and piano (1823, 2nd version)
- No. 2 D. 588, Song "Der Alpenjäger" ['Willst du nicht das Lämmlein hüten?'] for voice and piano (1817, 2nd version)

===== Op. 38 – "Der Liedler" =====
- D. 209, Song "Der Liedler" ['Gib, Schwester, mir die Harf herab'] for voice and piano (1815)

===== Op. 39 – "Sehnsucht" =====
- D. 636, Song "Sehnsucht" ['Ach, aus dieses Tales Gründen'] for voice and piano (1821?, 2nd setting; 3rd version)

===== Op. 41 – "Der Einsame" =====
- D. 800, Song "Der Einsame" ['Wenn meine Grillen schwirren'] for voice and piano (1825)

===== Op. 43 =====
- No. 1 D. 828, Song "Die junge Nonne" ['Wie braust durch die Wipfel'] for voice and piano (1825)
- No. 2 D. 827, Song "Nacht und Träume" ['Heil'ge Nacht, du sinkest nieder!'] for voice and piano (1823, 2nd version)

===== Op. 44 – "An die untergehende Sonne" =====
- D. 457, Song "An die untergehende Sonne" ['Sonne, du sinkst'] for voice and piano (1816 sketch, finisheD. 1817)

===== Op. 52 =====
Sieben Gesänge aus Walter Scotts Fräulein am See

- No. 1 D. 837, Song "Ellens Gesang I" ['Raste, Krieger, Krieg ist aus'] for voice and piano (1825)
- No. 2 D. 838, Song "Ellens Gesang II" ['Jäger, ruhe von der Jagd!'] for voice and piano (1825)
- No. 5 D. 846, Song "Normans Gesang" ['Die Nacht bricht bald herein'] for voice and piano (1825)
- No. 6 D. 839, Song "Ellens Gesang III (Hymne an die Jungfrau)" ['Ave Maria! Jungfrau mild'] for voice and piano, Ave Maria or Hymne an die Jungfrau (1825)
- No. 7 D. 843, Song "Lied des gefangenen Jägers" ['Mein Roß so müd'] for voice and piano (1825)

===== Op. 56 =====
- No. 1 D. 767, Song "Willkommen und Abschied" ['Es schlug mein Herz'] for voice and piano (1822, 2nd version)
- No. 2 D. 737, Song "An die Leier" ['Ich will von Atreus Söhnen'] for voice and piano (1822 or 1823?)
- No. 3 D. 738, Song "Im Haine" ['Sonnenstrahlen durch die Tannen'] for voice and piano (1822 or 1823?)

===== Op. 57 =====
- No. 1 D. 633, Song "Der Schmetterling" ['Wie soll ich nicht tanzen'] for voice and piano (1819 anD. 1823?)
- No. 2 D. 634, Song "Die Berge" ['Sieht uns der Blick gehoben'] for voice and piano (1819 anD. 1823?)
- No. 3 D. 193, Song "An den Mond" ['Geuß, lieber Mond, geuß deine Silberflimmer'] for voice and piano (1815, 2nd version)

===== Op. 58 =====
- No. 1 D. 312, Song "Hektors Abschied" ['Will sich Hektor ewig von mir wenden'] for voice and piano (1815, 2nd version)
- No. 2 D. 113, Song "An Emma" ['Weit in nebelgrauer Ferne'] for voice and piano (1814, 3rd version)
- No. 3 D. 191, Song "Des Mädchens Klage" ['Der Eichwald braust'] for voice and piano (1815, 2nd setting; 2nd version)

===== Op. 59 =====
- No. 1 D. 756, Song "Du liebst mich nicht" ['Mein Herz ist zerrissen, du liebst mich nicht!'] for voice and piano (1822, 2nd version)
- No. 2 D. 775, Song "Daß sie hier gewesen" ['Daß der Ostwind Düfte hauchet'] for voice and piano (1823?)
- No. 3 D. 776, Song "Du bist die Ruh" ['Du bist die Ruh, der Friede mild'] for voice and piano (1823)
- No. 4 D. 777, Song "Lachen und Weinen" ['Lachen und Weinen zu jeglicher Stunde'] for voice and piano (1823)

===== Op. 60 =====
- No. 1 D. 778, Song "Greisengesang" ['Der Frost hat mir bereifet'] for bass and piano (1823, 3rd version)
- No. 2 D. 801, Song "Dithyrambe" ['Nimmer, das glaub mir, erscheinen die Götter'] for bass and piano (pub. 1826, 2nd setting; 2nd version)

===== Op. 62 =====
- D. 877, Song cycle Gesänge aus "Wilhelm Meister" (1826)

2. "Lied der Mignon" ['Heiß mich nicht reden, heiß mich schweigen'] for voice and piano (2nd setting)
3. "Lied der Mignon" ['So laßt mich scheinen, bis ich werde'] for voice and piano (3rd setting)
4. "Lied der Mignon" ['Nur wer die Sehnsucht kennt'] for voice and piano (6th setting)

===== Op. 65 =====
- No. 1 D. 360, Song "Lied eines Schiffers an die Dioskuren" ['Dioskuren, Zwillingssterne'] for voice and piano (1816)
- No. 2 D. 649, Song "Der Wanderer" ['Wie deutlich des Mondes Licht'] for voice and piano (1819, 2nd version)
- No. 3 D. 753, Song "Heliopolis I" ['Im kalten, rauhen Norden ist Kunde mir geworden'] for voice and piano, Aus Heliopolis I or Im Hochgebirge (1822)

===== Op. 68 – "Der Wachtelschlag" =====
- D. 742, Song "Der Wachtelschlag" ['Ach! mir schallt's dorten so lieblich hervor'] for voice and piano (pub. 1822)

===== Op. 71 – "Drang in die Ferne" =====
- D. 770, Song "Drang in die Ferne" ['Vater, du glaubst es nicht'] for voice and piano (1823)

===== Op. 72 – "Auf dem Wasser zu singen" =====
- D. 774, Song "Auf dem Wasser zu singen" ['Mitten im Schimmer der spiegelnden Wellen'] for voice and piano (1823)

===== Op. 73 – "Die Rose" =====
- D. 745, Song "Die Rose" ['Es lockte schöne Wärme'] for voice and piano (1822, 1st version)

===== Op. 79 =====
- No. 1 D. 851, Song "Das Heimweh" ['Ach, der Gebirgssohn'] for voice and piano (1825, 2nd version)
- No. 2 D. 852, Song "Die Allmacht" ['Groß ist Jehovah, der Herr'] for voice and piano (1825, 1st setting)

===== Op. 80 =====
- No. 1 D. 870, Song "Der Wanderer an den Mond" ['Ich auf der Erd', am Himmel du'] for voice and piano (1826)
- No. 2 D. 871, Song "Das Zügenglöcklein" ['Kling die Nacht durch, klinge'] for voice and piano (1826, 2nd version)
- No. 3 D. 880, Song "Im Freien" ['Draußen in der weiten Nacht'] for voice and piano (1826)

===== Op. 81 =====
- No. 1 D. 904, Song "Alinde" ['Die Sonne sinkt in's tiefe Meer'] for voice and piano (1827)
- No. 2 D. 905, Song "An die Laute" ['Leiser, leiser, kleine Laute'] for voice and piano (1827)

===== Op. 83 =====
- D. 902, Three songs "Drei Gesänge" for bass and piano (1827)

1. "L'incanto degli occhi; Die Macht der Augen" ['Da voi, cari lumi'; 'Nur euch, schöne Sterne'] (2nd setting)
2. "Il traditor deluso; Der getäuschte Verräter" ['Ahimè, io tremo!'; 'Weh mir, ich bebe!']
3. "Il modo di prender moglie; Die Art ein Weib zu nehmen" ['Orsù! non ci pensiamo'; 'Wohlan! und ohne Zagen']

===== Op. 85 =====
- No. 1 D. 830, Song "Lied der Anne Lyle" ['Wärst du bei mir im Lebenstal'] for voice and piano (1825?)
- No. 2 D. 831, Song "Gesang der Norna" ['Mich führt mein Weg wohl meilenlang'] for voice and piano (1825)

===== Op. 86 – "Romanze des Richard Löwenherz" =====
- D. 907, Song "Romanze des Richard Löwenherz" ['Großer Taten tat der Ritter fern im heiligen Lande viel'] for voice and piano (1826?, 2nd version)

===== Op. 87 =====
- No. 1 D. 713, Song "Der Unglückliche" ['Die Nacht bricht an'] for voice and piano (1821, 2nd version)
- No. 2 D. 637, Song "Hoffnung" ['Es reden und träumen die Menschen viel'] for voice and piano (ca. 1819, 2nd setting)
- No. 3 D. 638, Song "Der Jüngling am Bache" ['An der Quelle saß der Knabe'] for voice and piano (1819, 3rd setting; 2nd version)

===== Op. 88 =====
- No. 1 D. 856, Song "Abendlied für die Entfernte" ['Hinaus mein Blick, hinaus ins Tal'] for voice and piano (1825)
- No. 2 D. 595, Song "Thekla (eine Geisterstimme)" ['Wo ich sei und wo mich hingewendet'] for voice and piano (1817, 2nd setting; 2nd version)
- No. 3 D. 862, Song "Um Mitternacht" ['Keine Stimme hör' ich schallen'] for voice and piano (1825 anD. 1826?, 2nd version)
- No. 4 D. 547, Song "An die Musik" ['Du holde Kunst'] for voice and piano (1817, 2nd version)

===== Op. 89 – Winterreise =====
- D. 911, Song cycle Winterreise for voice and piano (1827). Lyrics by Wilhelm Müller.

1. "Gute Nacht" ['Fremd bin ich eingezogen']
2. "Die Wetterfahne" ['Der Wind spielt mit der Wetterfahne']
3. "Gefror'ne Tränen" ['Gefror'ne Tropfen fallen']
4. "Erstarrung" ['Ich such' im Schnee vergebens']
5. "Der Lindenbaum" ['Am Brunnen vor dem Tore']
6. "Wasserflut" ['Manche Trän' aus meinen Augen']
7. "Auf dem Flusse" ['Der du so lustig rauschtest'] (2nd version)
8. "Rückblick" ['Es brennt mir unter beiden Sohlen']
9. "Irrlicht" ['In die tiefsten Felsengründe']
10. "Rast" ['Nun merk' ich erst, wie müd ich bin'] (2nd version)
11. "Frühlingstraum" ['Ich träumte von bunten Blumen'] (2nd version)
12. "Einsamkeit" ['Wie eine trübe Wolke']
13. "Die Post" ['Von der Straße her ein Posthorn klingt']
14. "Der greise Kopf" ['Der Reif hat einen weißen Schein']
15. "Die Krähe" ['Eine Krähe war mit mir aus der Stadt gezogen']
16. "Letzte Hoffnung" ['Hie und da ist an den Bäumen']
17. "Im Dorfe" ['Es bellen die Hunde']
18. "Der stürmische Morgen" ['Wie hat der Sturm zerrissen']
19. "Täuschung" ['Ein Licht tanzt freundlich vor mir her']
20. "Der Wegweiser" ['Was vermeid' ich denn die Wege']
21. "Das Wirtshaus" ['Auf einen Totenacker hat mich mein Weg gebracht']
22. "Mut" ['Fliegt der Schnee mir ins Gesicht'] (2nd version)
23. "Die Nebensonnen" ['Drei Sonnen sah ich'] (2nd version)
24. "Der Leiermann" ['Drüben hinterm Dorfe steht ein Leiermann']

===== Op. 92 =====
- No. 1 D. 764, Song "Der Musensohn" ['Durch Feld und Wald zu schweifen'] for voice and piano (1822, 2nd version)
- No. 2 D. 543, Song "Auf dem See" ['Und frische Nahrung'] for voice and piano (1817, 2nd version)
- No. 3 D. 142, Song "Geistes-Gruß" ['Hoch auf dem alten Turme'] for voice and piano (1815 or 1816, 6th version)

===== Op. 93 =====
- No. 1 D. 834, Song "Im Walde" ['Ich wandre über Berg und Tal'] for voice and piano (1825, 2nd version)
- No. 2 D. 853, Song "Auf der Bruck" ['Frisch trabe sonder Ruh und Rast'] for voice and piano (1825, 2nd version)

===== Op. 95 – Vier Refrainlieder =====
- D. 866, Song cycle Vier Refrainlieder for voice and piano (1828?)

1. "Die Unterscheidung" ['Die Mutter hat mich jüngst gescholten']
2. "Bei dir allein" ['Bei dir allein empfind ich, daß ich lebe']
3. "Die Männer sind méchant" ['Du sagtest mir es, Mutter']
4. "Irdisches Glück" ['So mancher sieht mit finstrer Miene']

===== Op. 96 =====
- No. 1 D. 939, Song "Die Sterne" ['Wie blitzen die Sterne so hell durch die Nacht'] for voice and piano (1828)
- No. 2 D. 909, Song "Jägers Liebeslied" ['Ich schieß' den Hirsch im grünen Forst'] for voice and piano (1827)
- No. 3 D. 768, Song "Wandrers Nachtlied" ['Über allen Gipfeln ist Ruh'] for voice and piano (1824)
- No. 4 D. 881, Song "Fischerweise" ['Den Fischer fechten Sorgen und Gram und Leid nicht an'] for voice and piano (1826, 2nd version)

===== Op. 97 =====
- D. 955, Song "Glaube, Hoffnung und Liebe" ['Glaube, hoffe, liebe!'] for voice and piano (1828)

===== Op. 98 =====
- No. 1 D. 497, Song "An die Nachtigall" ['Er liegt und schläft'] for voice and piano (1816)
- No. 2 D. 498, Song "Wiegenlied" ['Schlafe, schlafe, holder süßer Knabe'] for voice and piano (1816)
- No. 3 D. 573, Song "Iphigenia" ['Blüht denn hier an Tauris Strande'] for voice and piano (1817, 3rd version)

===== Op. 105 =====
- No. 1 D. 865, Song "Widerspruch" ['Wenn ich durch Busch und Zweig'] for voice and piano (1828, 2nd version)
- No. 2 D. 867, Song "Wiegenlied" ['Wie sich der Äuglein kindlicher Himmel'] for voice and piano (1826 or 1827)
- No. 3 D. 878, Song "Am Fenster" ['Ihr lieben Mauern hold und traut'] for voice and piano (1826)
- No. 4 D. 879, Song "Sehnsucht" ['Die Scheibe friert, der Wind ist rauh'] for voice and piano (1826)

===== Op. 106 =====
- No. 1 D. 922, Song "Heimliches Lieben" ['O du, wenn deine Lippen mich berühren'] for voice and piano (1827, 2nd version)
- No. 2 D. 926, Song "Das Weinen" ['Gar tröstlich kommt geronnen'] for voice and piano (1827–1828)
- No. 3 D. 927, Song "Vor meiner Wiege" ['Das also, das ist der enge Schrein'] for voice and piano (1827–1828)
- No. 4 D. 891, Song "An Sylvia" ['Was ist Silvia, saget an'] for voice and piano, Gesang (1826)

===== Op. 108 =====
- No. 1 D. 884, Song "Über Wildemann" ['Die Winde sausen am Tannenhang'] for voice and piano (1826)
- No. 2 D. 758, Song "Todesmusik" ['In des Todes Feierstunde'] for voice and piano (1822, 2nd version)
- No. 3 D. 229, Song "Die Erscheinung" ("Erinnerung") ['Ich lag auf grünen Matten'] for voice and piano (1815)

==== Lieder published posthumously ====
===== Op. posth. 101 =====
- No. 1 D. 882, Song "Im Frühling" ['Still sitz' ich an des Hügels Hang'] for voice and piano (1826, 2nd version)
- No. 2 D. 833, Song "Der blinde Knabe" ['O sagt, ihr Lieben, mir einmal'] for voice and piano (1825, 2nd version)
- No. 3 D. 546, Song "Trost im Liede" ['Braust des Unglücks Sturm empor'] for voice and piano (1817, 2nd version)

===== Op. posth. 109 =====
- No. 1 D. 361, Song "Am Bach im Frühling" ['Du brachst sie nun, die kalte Rinde'] for voice and piano (1816, 1st version)
- No. 2 D. 143, Song "Genügsamkeit" ['Dort raget ein Berg aus den Wolken her'] for voice and piano (1815)
- No. 3 D. 530, Song "An eine Quelle" ['Du kleine grünumwachs'ne Quelle'] for voice and piano (1817)

===== Op. posth. 110 – "Der Kampf" =====
- D. 594, Song "Der Kampf" ['Nein, länger werd' ich diesen Kampf nicht kämpfen'] for bass and piano (1817)

===== Op. posth. 111 =====
- No. 2 D. 395, Song "Lebens-Melodien" ['Auf den Wassern wohnt mein stilles Leben'] for voice and piano (1816)
- No. 3 D. 391, Song "Die vier Weltalter" ['Wohl perlet im Glase'] for voice and piano (1816)

===== Op. posth. 115 =====
- No. 1 D. 917, Song "Das Lied im Grünen" ['Ins Grüne, ins Grüne, da lockt uns der Frühling'] for voice and piano (1827)
- No. 2 D. 260, Song "Wonne der Wehmut" ['Trocknet nicht, trocknet nicht, Tränen der ewigen Liebe'] for voice and piano (1815)
- No. 3 D. 410, Song "Sprache der Liebe" ['Laß dich mit gelinden Schlägen rühren'] for voice and piano (1816)

===== Op. posth. 116 – "Die Erwartung" =====
- D. 159, Song "Die Erwartung" ['Hör' ich das Pförtchen nicht gehen?'] for voice and piano (1816, 2nd version)

===== Op. posth. 117 – "Der Sänger" =====
- D. 149, Song "Der Sänger" ['Was hör' ich draußen vor dem Tor'] for voice and piano (1815, 2nd version)

===== Op. posth. 118 =====
- No. 1 D. 233, Song "Geist der Liebe" ['Wer bist du, Geist der Liebe'] for voice and piano (1815)
- No. 2 D. 221, Song "Der Abend" ['Der Abend blüht'] for voice and piano (1815)
- No. 3 D. 234, Song "Tischlied" ['Mich ergreift, ich weiß nicht wie, himmlisches Behagen'] for voice and piano (1815)
- No. 4 D. 248, Song "Lob des Tokayers" ['O köstlicher Tokayer, o königlicher Wein'] for voice and piano (1815)
- No. 5 D. 270, Song "An die Sonne" ['Sinke, liebe Sonne'] for voice and piano (1815)
- No. 6 D. 247, Song "Die Spinnerin" ['Als ich still und ruhig spann'] for voice and piano (1815)

===== Op. posth. 119 – "Auf dem Strom" =====
- D. 943, Song "Auf dem Strom" ['Nimm die letzten Abschiedsküsse'] for voice, horn (or violoncello) and piano (1828)

===== Op. posth. 123 – "Viola" =====
- D. 786, Song "Viola" ['Schneeglöcklein, o Schneeglöcklein'] for voice and piano (1823)

===== Op. posth. 124 =====
- D. 857, Two songs "Zwei Szenen aus dem Schauspiel Lacrimas" for voice and piano (1825)

1. "Lied der Delphine" ['Ach, was soll ich beginnen vor Liebe?']
2. "Lied des Florio" ['Nun, da Schatten niedergleiten']

===== Op. posth. 126 – "Ballade" =====
- D. 134, Song "Ballade" ['Ein Fräulein schaut vom hohen Turm'] for voice and piano (1815?)

===== Op. posth. 129 – "Der Hirt auf dem Felsen" =====
- D. 965, Song "Der Hirt auf dem Felsen" ['Wenn auf dem höchsten Fels ich steh'] for voice, clarinet and piano (1828)

===== Op. posth. 130 – "Das Echo" =====
- D. 990C, Song "Das Echo" ['Herzliebe gute Mutter, o grolle nicht mit mir'] for voice and piano [formerly D. 868] (1828?)

===== Op. posth. 131 =====
- No. 1 D. 141, Song "Der Mondabend" ['Rein und freundlich lacht der Himmel'] for voice and piano (1815)
- No. 3 D. 23, Song "Klaglied" ['Meine Ruh' ist dahin'] for voice and piano (1812)

===== Op. posth. 165 =====
- No. 1 D. 673, Song "Die Liebende schreibt" ['Ein Blick von deinen Augen'] for voice and piano (1819, 2nd version)
- No. 2 D. 670, Song "Die Sternennächte" ['In monderhellten Nächten'] for voice and piano (1819, 2nd version)
- No. 3 D. 155, Song "Das Bild" ['Ein Mädchen ist's'] for voice and piano (1815)
- No. 4 D. 230, Song "Die Täuschung" ['Im Erlenbusch, im Tannerhain'] for voice and piano (1815)
- No. 5 D. 923, Song "Eine altschottische Ballade" ['Dein Schwert, wie ist's von Blut so rot'] for male voice, female voice and piano, Edward (1827, 1st version)

===== Op. posth. 172 =====
- No. 1 D. 213, Song "Der Traum" ['Mir träumt' ich war ein Vögelein'] for voice and piano (1815)
- No. 2 D. 214, Song "Die Laube" ['Nimmer werd' ich, nimmer dein vergessen'] for voice and piano (1815)
- No. 3 D. 196, Song "An die Nachtigall" ['Geuß nicht so laut der liebentflammten Lieder'] for voice and piano (1815)
- No. 4 D. 231, Song "Das Sehnen" ['Wehmut, die mich hüllt'] for voice and piano (1815)
- No. 5 D. 283, Song "An den Frühling" ['Willkommen, schöner Jüngling!'] for voice and piano (1815, 1st setting)
- No. 6 D. 691, Song "Die Vögel" ['Wie lieblich und fröhlich'] for voice and piano (1820)

===== Op. posth. 173 =====
- No. 1 D. 195, Song "Amalia" ['Schön wie Engel voll Walhallas Wonne'] for voice and piano (1815)
- No. 2 D. 793, Song "Das Geheimnis" ['Sie konnte mir kein Wörtchen sagen'] for voice and piano (1823, 2nd setting)
- No. 3 D. 177, Song "Vergebliche Liebe" ['Ja, ich weiß es, diese treue Liebe'] for voice and piano (1815)
- No. 4 D. 731, Song "Der Blumen Schmerz" ['Wie tönt es mir so schaurig'] for voice and piano (1821)
- No. 5 D. 519, Song "Die Blumensprache" ['Es deuten die Blumen des Herzens Gefühle'] for voice and piano (1817?)
- No. 6 D. 627, Song "Das Abendrot" ['Du heilig, glühend Abendrot!'] for bass and piano (1818)

=== Lieder with orchestral accompaniment ===
- D. 535, Song "Lied (Brüder, schrecklich brennt die Träne)" ['Brüder, schrecklich brennt die Träne'] for soprano and small orchestra (1817)

=== Lieder with chamber ensemble accompaniment ===
- D. 81, Song "Auf den Sieg der Deutschen" ['Verschwunden sind die Schmerzen'] for voice, two violins and violoncello (1813)
- D. 83, Song "Zur Namensfeier des Herrn Andreas Siller" ['Des Phöbus Strahlen'] for voice, violin and harp (1813)

=== Lieder with piano accompaniment ===
==== Lieder for soprano and piano ====
- D. 42, Aria "Misero pargoletto" ['Misero pargoletto'] for soprano and piano (1813?, 1st setting: 1st anD. 2nd versions – both fragments, in addition to a 2nd setting)
- D. 78, Aria "Son fra l'onde" ['Son fra l'onde in mezzo al mare'] for soprano and piano (1813)
- D. 510, Aria "Vedi quanto adoro" ['Vedi quanto adoro'] for soprano and piano (1816, 1st, 2nd, 3rd anD. 4th versions; also appears as "Vedi quanto t'adoro")
- D. 528, Arietta "La pastorella al prato" ['La pastorella al prato'] for soprano and piano, La Pastorella (1817, 2nd setting)
- D. 990E, Aria "L'incanto degli occhi" ['Da voi, cari lumi'] for soprano and piano (1816?, 1st setting; fragment)
- D. 990F, Aria "Ombre amene" ['Ombre amene'] for soprano and piano, La serenata (1816?, fragment; originally, the Deutsch catalogue incorrectly listed this entry as an early version of the song "Il traditor deluso")

==== Lieder for bass and piano ====
- D. 1A, Song "Gesang in c" ['?'] for bass and piano (before 1810, fragment without text)
- D. 44, Song "Totengräberlied" ['Grabe, Spaten, grabe!'] for bass and piano (1813, 2nd setting)
- D. 52, Song "Sehnsucht" ['Ach, aus dieses Tales Gründen'] for bass and piano (1813, 1st setting)
- D. 76, Aria "Pensa, che questo istante" ['Pensa, che questo istante'] for bass and piano (1813, 1st anD. 2nd versions)
- D. 77, Song "Der Taucher" ['Wer wagt es, Rittersmann oder Knapp'] for bass and piano (1813–1815, 1st anD. 2nd versions; 2nd version was formerly D. 111)
- D. 104, Song "Die Befreier Europas in Paris" ['Sie sind in Paris!'] for bass and piano (1814, 1st, 2nd anD. 3rd versions)
- D. 518, Song "An den Tod" ['Tod, du Schrecken der Natur'] for bass and piano (1816 or 1817)
- D. 524, Song "Der Alpenjäger" ['Auf hohen Bergesrücken'] for bass and piano (1817, 2nd version)
- D. 525, Song "Wie Ulfru fischt" ['Der Angel zuckt, die Rute bebt'] for bass and piano (1817, 1st version)
- D. 526, Song "Fahrt zum Hades" ['Der Nachen dröhnt'] for bass and piano (1817)
- D. 536, Song "Der Schiffer" ['Im winde, im Sturme befahr' ich den Fluß'] for bass and piano (1817?, 1st version)
- D. 565, Song "Der Strom" ['Mein Leben wälzt sich murrend fort'] for bass and piano (1817?)
- D. 674, Song "Prometheus" ['Bedecke deinen Himmel, Zeus'] for bass and piano (1819)
- D. 716, Song "Grenzen der Menschheit" ['Wenn der uralte heilige Vater'] for bass and piano (1821)
- D. 721, Song "Mahomets Gesang" ['Seht den Felsenquell'] for bass and piano (1821, 2nd setting; fragment)
- D. 754, Song "Heliopolis II" ['Fels auf Felsen hingewälzet'] for bass and piano, Aus Heliopolis II (1822)
- D. 778, Song "Greisengesang" ['Der Frost hat mir bereifet'] for bass and piano (1823, 1st anD. 2nd versions)
- D. 778A, Song "Die Wallfahrt" ['Meine Tränen im Bußgewand'] for bass and piano (1823?)
- D. 785, Song "Der zürnende Barde" ['Wer wagt's, wer wagt's'] for bass and piano (1823)
- D. 801, Song "Dithyrambe" ['Nimmer, das glaub mir, erscheinen die Götter'] for bass and piano (pub. 1826, 2nd setting; 1st version)
- D. 805, Song "Der Sieg" ['O unbewölktes Leben'] for bass and piano (1824)

==== Lieder for any voice type and piano ====
===== D. 1 to D. 100 =====
- D. 5, Song "Hagars Klage" ['Hier am Hügel heißen Sandes'] for voice and piano (1811)
- D. 6, Song "Des Mädchens Klage" ['Der Eichwald brauset'] for voice and piano (1811 or 1812, 1st setting)
- D. 7, Song "Leichenfantasie" ['Mit erstorbnem Scheinen'] for voice and piano (1811)
- D. 10, Song "Der Vatermörder" ['Ein Vater starb von des Sohnes Hand'] for voice and piano (1811)
- D. 15, Song "Der Geistertanz" ['Die bretterne Kammer der Toten erbebt'] for voice and piano (ca. 1812, 1st setting; fragment)
- D. 15A, Song "Der Geistertanz" ['Die bretterne Kammer der Toten erbebt'] for voice and piano [formerly D. 15] (ca. 1812, 2nd setting; fragment)
- D. 30, Song "Der Jüngling am Bache" ['An der Quelle saß der Knabe'] for voice and piano (1812, 1st setting)
- D. 39, Song "Lebenstraum" ['Ich saß an einer Tempelhalle'] for voice and piano (1810?, sketch; also appears as "Ich saß an einer Tempelhalle")
- D. 50, Song "Die Schatten" ['Freunde, deren Grüfte sich schon bemoosten!'] for voice and piano (1813)
- D. 59, Song "Verklärung" ['Lebensfunke, vom Himmel erglüht'] for voice and piano (1813)
- D. 73, Song "Thekla (eine Geisterstimme)" ['Wo ich sei, und wo mich hingewendet'] for voice and piano (1813, 1st setting)
- D. 93, Song cycle Don Gayseros for voice and piano (1815?)

1. "Don Gayseros I" ['Don Gayseros, wunderlicher, schöner Ritter']
2. "Don Gayseros II" ['Nächtens klang die süße Laute'] (fragment)
3. "Don Gayseros III" ['An dem jungen Morgenhimmel'] (fragment)

- D. 95, Song "Adelaide" ['Einsam wandelt dein Freund'] for voice and piano (1814)
- D. 97, Song "Trost. An Elisa" ['Lehnst du deine bleichgehärmte Wange'] for voice and piano (1814)
- D. 98, Song "Erinnerungen" ['Am Seegestad, in lauen Vollmondnächten'] for voice and piano (1814, 1st setting; 2 versions; 1st version is a fragment)
- D. 99, Song "Andenken" ['Ich denke dein, wenn durch den Hain'] for voice and piano (1814, 1st setting)
- D. 100 Song "Geisternähe" ['Der Dämm'rung Schein durchblinkt den Hain'] for voice and piano (1814)

===== D. 101 to D. 200 =====
- D. 101, Song "Erinnerung" ("Todtenopfer") ['Kein Rosenschimmer leuchtet'] for voice and piano (1814)
- D. 102, Song "Die Betende" ['Laura betet!'] for voice and piano (1814)
- D. 107, Song "Lied aus der Ferne" ['Wenn in des Abends letztem Scheine'] for voice and piano (1814, 1st anD. 2nd versions)
- D. 108, Song "Der Abend" ['Purpur malt die Tannenhügel'] for voice and piano (1814)
- D. 109, Song "Lied der Liebe" ['Durch Fichten am Hügel'] for voice and piano (1814)
- D. 113, Song "An Emma" ['Weit in nebelgrauer Ferne'] for voice and piano (1814; 1st anD. 2nd versions, in addition to a modifieD. 3rd version)
- D. 114, Song "Romanze" ['Ein Fräulein klagt' im finstern Turm'] for voice and piano (1814; 1st anD. 2nd versions, in addition to a variant of the 1st version)
- D. 115, Song "An Laura, als sie Klopstocks Auferstehungslied sang" ['Herzen, die gen Himmel sich erheben'] for voice and piano (1814)
- D. 116, Song "Der Geistertanz" ['Die bretterne Kammer der Toten erbebt'] for voice and piano (1814, 3rd setting)
- D. 117, Song "Das Mädchen aus der Fremde" ['In einem Tal bei armen Hirten'] for voice and piano (1814, 1st setting)
- D. 119, Song "Nachtgesang" ['O! gieb, vom weichen Pfühle'] for voice and piano (1814)
- D. 120, Song "Trost in Tränen" ['Wie kommt's, daß du so traurig bist'] for voice and piano (1814)
- D. 121, Song "Schäfers Klagelied" ['Da droben auf jenem Berge'] for voice and piano (1814, 2nd version)
- D. 122, Song "Ammenlied" ['Am hohen, hohen Turm'] for voice and piano (1814)
- D. 123, Song "Sehnsucht" ['Was zieht mir das Herz so?'] for voice and piano (1814)
- D. 124, Song "Am See" ['Sitz' ich im Gras am glatten See'] for voice and piano (1814, 1st anD. 2nd versions; 1st version is a fragment)
- D 126, Song "Szene aus Faust" ['Wie anders, Gretchen, war dir's'] for voice and piano (1814, 1st anD. 2nd versions)
- D. 138, Song "Rastlose Liebe" ['Dem Schnee, dem Regen, dem Wind entgegen'] for voice and piano (1815, 2nd version)
- D. 142, Song "Geistes-Gruß" ['Hoch auf dem alten Turme'] for voice and piano (1815 or 1816; 1st, 2nd, 3rd, 4th anD. 5th versions)
- D. 144, Song "Romanze" ['In der Väter Hallen ruhte'] for voice and piano (1816, sketch)
- D. 149, Song "Der Sänger" ['Was hör' ich draußen vor dem Tor'] for voice and piano (1815, 1st version)
- D. 150, Song "Lodas Gespenst" ['Der bleiche, kalte Mond erhob sich in Osten'] for voice and piano (1816)
- D. 151, Song "Auf einen Kirchhof" ['Sei gegrüßt, geweihte Stille'] for voice and piano (1815)
- D. 152, Song "Minona" ['Wie treiben die Wolden so finster und schwer'] for voice and piano (1815)
- D. 153, Song "Als ich sie erröten sah" ['All' mein Wirken, all' mein Leben'] for voice and piano (1815)
- D. 159, Song "Die Erwartung" ['Hör' ich das Pförtchen nicht gehen?'] for voice and piano (1816, 1st version)
- D. 160, Song "Am Flusse" ['Verfließet, vielgeliebte Lieder'] for voice and piano (1815, 1st setting)
- D. 161, Song "An Mignon" ['Über Tal und Fluß getragen'] for voice and piano (1815, 1st version)
- D. 162, Song "Nähe des Geliebten" ['Ich denke dein, wenn mir der Sonne Schimmer'] for voice and piano (1815, 1st version)
- D. 163, Song "Sängers Morgenlied" ['Süßes Licht! aus goldenen Pforten'] for voice and piano (1815, 1st setting)
- D. 164, Song "Liebesrausch" ['Glanz des Guten und des Schönen strahlt mir dein hohes Bild'] for voice and piano (1815, 1st setting; fragment)
- D. 165, Song "Sängers Morgenlied" ['Süßes Licht! aus goldenen Pforten'] for voice and piano (1815, 2nd setting)
- D. 166, Song "Amphiaraos" ['Vor Thebens siebenfach gähnenden Toren'] for voice and piano (1815)
- D. 171, Song "Gebet während der Schlacht" ['Vater, ich rufe dich!'] for voice and piano (1815, 2 versions)
- D. 172, Song "Der Morgenstern" ['Stern der Liebe, Glanzgebilde!'] for voice and piano (1815, 1st setting; sketch)
- D. 174, Song "Das war ich" ['Jüngst träumte mir'] for voice and piano (1815, 1st anD. 2nd versions; 2nd version is a sketch)
- D. 176, Song "Die Sterne" ['Was funkelt ihr so mild mich an?'] for voice and piano (1815)
- D. 177A, Song "Am ersten Mai" ['Ich ging mit ihr im Freien'] for voice and piano (before 1821, lost)
- D. 179, Song "Liebesrausch" ['Dir, Mädchen, schlägt mit leisem Beben'] for voice and piano (1815, 2nd setting)
- D. 180, Song "Sehnsucht der Liebe" ['Wie die Nacht mit heil'gem Beben'] for voice and piano (1815)
- D. 182, Song "Die erste Liebe" ['Die erste Liebe füllt das Herz'] for voice and piano (1815)
- D. 186, Song "Die Sterbende" ['Heil! dies ist die letzte Zähre'] for voice and piano (1815)
- D. 187, Song "Stimme der Liebe" ['Abendgewölke schweben hell'] for voice and piano (1815, 1st setting)
- D. 188, Song "Naturgenuß" ['Im Abendschimmer wallt der Quell'] for voice and piano (1815, 1st setting)
- D. 190, Singspiel "Der vierjährige Posten" (1815)

5. Arie: Gott! Gott! höre meine Stimme (version for voice and piano)

- D. 191, Song "Des Mädchens Klage" ['Der Eichwald braust'] for voice and piano (1815, 2nd setting; 1st version)
- D. 192, Song "Der Jüngling am Bache" ['An der Quelle saß der Knabe'] for voice and piano (1815, 2nd setting)
- D. 193, Song "An den Mond" ['Geuß, lieber Mond, geuß deine Silberflimmer'] for voice and piano (1815, 1st version)
- D. 194, Song "Die Mainacht" ['Wann der silberne Mond'] for voice and piano (1815)
- D. 197, Song "An die Apfelbäume, wo ich Julien erblickte" ['Ein heilig Säuseln und ein Gesangeston'] for voice and piano (1815)
- D. 198, Song "Seufzer" ['Die Nachtigall singt überall'] for voice and piano (1815)

===== D. 201 to D. 300 =====
- D. 201, Song "Auf den Tod einer Nachtigall" ['Sie ist dahin, die Maienlieder tönte'] for voice and piano (1815, 1st setting; sketch)
- D. 204A, Song "Das Traumbild" ['?'] for voice and piano (1815, lost)
- D. 206, Song "Liebeständelei" ['Süßes Liebchen, komm zu mir!'] for voice and piano (1815)
- D. 207, Song "Der Liebende" ['Beglückt, beglückt, wer dich erblickt'] for voice and piano (1815)
- D. 208, Song "Die Nonne" ['Es liebt' in Welschland irgendwo'] for voice and piano (1815, 1st anD. 2nd versions; 1st version is a fragment; 2nd version was formerly D. 212)
- D. 210, Song "Die Liebe" ['Freudvoll und leidvoll, gedankenvoll sein'] for voice and piano, Klärchens Lied (1815)
- D. 211, Song "Adelwold und Emma" ['Hoch, und ehern schier von Dauer'] for voice and piano (1815)
- D. 215, Song "Jägers Abendlied" ['Im Felde schleich' ich still und wild'] for voice and piano (1815, 1st setting)
- D. 215A, Song "Meeres Stille" ['Tiefe Stille herrscht im Wasser'] for voice and piano (1815, 1st setting)
- D. 217, Song "Kolmas Klage" ['Rund um mich Nacht'] for voice and piano (1815)
- D. 218, Song "Grablied" ['Er fiel den Tod fürs Vaterland'] for voice and piano (1815)
- D. 219, Song "Das Finden" ['Ich hab' ein Mädchen funden'] for voice and piano (1815)
- D. 222, Song "Lieb Minna" ['Schwüler Hauch weht mir herüber'] for voice and piano (1815, also appears as "Lieb Minna. Romanze")
- D. 225, Song "Der Fischer" ['Das Wasser rauscht', das Wasser schwoll'] for voice and piano (1815, 1st version and modifieD. 2nd version with changes by Johann Michael Vogl)
- D. 227, Song "Idens Nachtgesang" ['Vernimm es, Nacht'] for voice and piano (1815)
- D. 228, Song "Von Ida" ['Der Morgen blüht, der Osten glüht'] for voice and piano (1815)
- D. 235, Song "Abends unter der Linde" ['Woher, o namenloses Sehnen'] for voice and piano (1815, 1st setting)
- D. 237, Song "Abends unter der Linde" ['Woher, o namenloses Sehnen'] for voice and piano (1815, 2nd setting; 2 versions)
- D. 238, Song "Die Mondnacht" ['Siehe, wie die Mondesstrahlen'] for voice and piano (1815)
- D. 240, Song "Huldigung" ['Ganz verloren, ganz versunken in dein Anschaun'] for voice and piano (1815)
- D. 241, Song "Alles um Liebe" ['Was ist es, das die Seele füllt?'] for voice and piano (1815)
- D. 246, Song "Die Bürgschaft" ['Zu Dionys, dem Tyrannen'] for voice and piano (1815)
- D. 250, Song "Das Geheimnis" ['Sie konnte mir kein Wörtchen sagen'] for voice and piano (1815, 1st setting)
- D. 251, Song "Hoffnung" ['Es reden und träumen die Menschen viel'] for voice and piano (1815, 1st setting)
- D. 252, Song "Das Mädchen aus der Fremde" ['In einem Tal bei armen Hirten'] for voice and piano (1815, 2nd setting)
- D. 253, Song "Punschlied. Im Norden zu singen" ['Auf der Berge freien Höhen'] for voice and piano (1815, 1st version)
- D. 254, Song "Der Gott und die Bajadere" ['Mahadöh, der Herr der Erde'] for voice and piano (1815, also appears as "Der Gott und die Bajadere. Indische Legende")
- D. 255, Song "Der Rattenfänger" ['Ich bin der wohlbekannte Sänger'] for voice and piano (1815)
- D. 256, Song "Der Schatzgräber" ['Arm am Beutel, krank am Herzen'] for voice and piano (1815)
- D. 258, Song "Bundeslied" ['In allen guten Stunden'] for voice and piano (1815)
- D. 259, Song "An den Mond" ['Fullest wieder Busch und Tal'] for voice and piano (1815, 1st setting)
- D. 261, Song "Wer kauft Liebesgötter?" ['Von allen schönen Waren'] for voice and piano (1815, 2 versions)
- D. 262, Song "Die Fröhlichkeit" ['Wess' Adern leichtes Blut durchspringt'] for voice and piano (1815)
- D. 263, Song "Cora an die Sonne" ['Nach so vielen trüben Tagen'] for voice and piano (1815)
- D. 264, Song "Der Morgenkuß" ['Durch eine ganze Nacht sich nah zu sein'] for voice and piano (1815, 1st anD. 2nd versions)
- D. 265, Song "Abendständchen. An Lina" ['Sei sanft wie ihre Seele'] for voice and piano (1815)
- D. 266, Song "Morgenlied" ['Willkommen, rotes Morgenlicht!'] for voice and piano (1815)
- D. 271, Song "Der Weiberfreund" ['Noch fand von Evens Töchterscharen ich keine'] for voice and piano (1815)
- D. 272, Song "An die Sonne" ['Königliche Morgensonne'] for voice and piano (1815)
- D. 273, Song "Lilla an die Morgenröte" ['Wie schön bist du, du güldne Morgenröte'] for voice and piano (1815)
- D. 274, Song "Tischlerlied" ['Mein Handwerk geht durch alle Welt'] for voice and piano (1815, 1st anD. 2nd versions)
- D. 275, Song "Totenkranz für ein Kind" ['Sanft wehn, im Hauch der Abendluft'] for voice and piano (1815)
- D. 276, Song "Abendlied" ['Groß und rotenflammet'] for voice and piano (1815)
- D. 278, Song "Ossians Lied nach dem Falle Nathos" ['Beugt euch aus euren Wolken nieder'] for voice and piano (1815; 1st, 2nd anD. 3rd versions; 1st version is a fragment)
- D. 280, Song "Das Rosenband" ['Im Frühlingsgarten fand ich sie'] for voice and piano (1815)
- D. 281, Song "Das Mädchen von Inistore" ['Mädchen Inistores, wein auf dem Felsen'] for voice and piano (1815, 1st anD. 2nd versions)
- D. 282, Song "Cronnan" ['Ich sitz' bei der moosigten Quelle'] for voice and piano (1815, 1st anD. 2nd versions)
- D. 284, Song "Lied (Es ist so angenehm)" ['Es ist so angenehm, so süß'] for voice and piano (1815)
- D. 285, Song "Furcht der Geliebten/An Cidli" ['Cidli, du weinest'] for voice and piano (1815, 1st anD. 2nd versions)
- D. 286, Song "Selma und Selmar" ['Weine du nicht'] for voice and piano (1815, 1st anD. 2nd versions)
- D. 287, Song "Vaterlandslied" ['Ich bin ein deutsches Mädchen'] for voice and piano (1815, 1st anD. 2nd versions)
- D. 288, Song "An Sie" ['Zeit, Verkündigerin der besten Freuden'] for voice and piano (1815)
- D. 289, Song "Die Sommernacht" ['Wenn der Schimmer von dem Monde'] for voice and piano (1815, 1st anD. 2nd versions)
- D. 290, Song "Die frühen Gräber" ['Willkommen, o silberner Mond'] for voice and piano (1815)
- D. 291, Song "Dem Unendlichen" ['Wie erhebt sich das Herz'] for voice and piano (1815, 1st, 2nd anD. 3rd versions)
- D. 293, Song "Shilric und Vinvela" ['Mein Geliebter ist ein Sohn des Hügels'] for voice and piano (1815, 1st anD. 2nd versions)
- D. 295, Song "Hoffnung" ['Schaff, das Tagwerk meiner Hände'] for voice and piano (1815 or 1816?, 1st anD. 2nd versions)
- D. 296, Song "An den Mond" ['Füllest wieder Busch und Tal'] for voice and piano (1815 or 1816?, 2nd setting)
- D. 297, Song "Augenlied" ['Süße Augen, klare Bronnen!'] for voice and piano (1817?, 1st anD. 2nd versions, in addition to a modifieD. 2nd version)
- D. 298, Song "Liane" ['Hast du Lianen nicht gesehen?'] for voice and piano (1815)
- D. 300, Song "Der Jüngling an der Quelle" ['Leise, rieselnder Quell'] for voice and piano (1816 or 1817)

===== D. 301 to D. 400 =====
- D. 301, Song "Lambertine" ['O Liebe, die mein Herz erfüllet'] for voice and piano (1815)
- D. 302, Song "Labetrank der Liebe" ['Wenn im Spiele leiser Töne'] for voice and piano (1815)
- D. 303, Song "An die Geliebte" ['O, daß ich dir vom stillen Auge'] for voice and piano (1815)
- D. 304, Song "Wiegenlied" ['Schlumm're sanft! Noch an dem Mutterherzen'] for voice and piano (1815)
- D. 305, Song "Mein Gruß an den Mai" ['Sei mir gegrüßt, o Mai'] for voice and piano (1815)
- D. 306, Song "Skolie" ['Laßt im Morgenstrahl des Mai'n'] for voice and piano (1815)
- D. 307, Song "Die Sternenwelten" ['Oben drehen sich die großen unbekannten Welten dort'] for voice and piano (1815)
- D. 308, Song "Die Macht der Liebe" ['Überall, wohin mein Auge blicket'] for voice and piano (1815)
- D. 309, Song "Das gestörte Glück" ['Ich hab' ein hießes junges Blut'] for voice and piano (1815)
- D. 310, Song "Sehnsucht" ['Nur wer die Sehnsucht kennt'] for voice and piano (1815, 1st setting; 1st anD. 2nd versions)
- D. 311, Song "An den Mond" ['?'] for voice and piano (1815?, sketch without text)
- D. 312, Song "Hektors Abschied" ['Will sich Hektor ewig von mir wenden'] for voice and piano (1815, 1st version)
- D. 313, Song "Die Sterne" ['Wie wohl ist mir im Dunkeln!'] for voice and piano (1815)
- D. 314, Song "Nachtgesang" ['Tiefe Feier schauert um die Welt'] for voice and piano (1815, 1st anD. 2nd versions)
- D. 315, Song "An Rosa I" ['Warum bist du nicht hier'] for voice and piano (1815, 1st anD. 2nd versions)
- D. 316, Song "An Rosa II" ['Rosa, denskt du an mich?'] for voice and piano (1815, 1st anD. 2nd versions)
- D. 317, Song "Idens Schwanenlied" ['Wie schaust du aus dem Nebelflor'] for voice and piano (1815, 1st anD. 2nd versions)
- D. 318, Song "Schwangesang" ['Endlich stehn die Pforten offen'] for voice and piano (1815)
- D. 319, Song "Luisens Antwort" ['Wohl weinen Gottes Engel'] for voice and piano (1815, 1st anD. 2nd versions)
- D. 320, Song "Der Zufriedene" ['Zwar schuf das Glück hienieden'] for voice and piano (1815)
- D. 321, Song "Mignon" ['Kennst du das Land'] for voice and piano (1815, 1st anD. 2nd versions)
- D. 322, Song "Hermann und Thusnelda" ['Ha, dort kömmt er'] for voice and piano (1815, 1st anD. 2nd versions)
- D. 323, Song "Klage der Ceres" ['Ist der holde Lenz erschienen?'] for voice and piano (1816; the last part, "O so laßt euch froh begrüssen" was formerly D. 991; original version, in addition to both a variant of mm. 142–203 and a modified version)
- D. 325, Song "Harfenspieler" ['Wer sich der Einsamkeit ergibt'] for voice and piano (1815, 1st setting)
- D. 327, Song "Lorma" ['Lorma saß in der Halle von Aldo'] for voice and piano (1815, 1st setting; fragment)
- D. 328, Song "Erlkönig" ['Wer reitet so spät durch Nacht und Wind?'] for voice and piano (1815, 1st, 2nd anD. 3rd versions)
- D. 329, Song "Die drei Sänger" ['Der König saß beim frohen Mahle'] for voice and piano (1815, fragment)
- D. 342, Song "An mein Klavier" ['Sanftes Klavier, welche Entzückungen schaffest du mir'] for voice and piano, Seraphine an ihr Klavier (ca. 1816)
- D. 343, Song "Am Tage Aller Seelen" ['Ruhn in Frieden alle Seelen'] for voice and piano, Litanei auf das Fest Aller Seelen (1816, 1st anD. 2nd versions)
- D. 344, Song "Am ersten Maimorgen" ['Heute will ich fröhlich sein'] for voice and piano (1816?)
- D. 350, Song "Der Entfernten" ['Wohl denk' ich allenthalben'] for voice and piano (1816?, 2nd setting)
- D. 351, Song "Fischerlied" ['Das Fischergewerbe gibt rüstigen Mut'] for voice and piano (1816?, 1st setting)
- D. 358, Song "Die Nacht" ['Du verstörst uns nicht, o Nacht!'] for voice and piano (1816, 1st anD. 2nd versions)
- D. 359, Song "Sehnsucht" ['Nur wer die Sehnsucht kennt'] for voice and piano, Lied der Mignon (1816, 2nd setting)
- D. 361, Song "Am Bach im Frühling" ['Du brachst sie nun, die kalte Rinde'] for voice and piano (1816, 2nd version)
- D. 362, Song "Zufriedenheit" ['Ich bin vergnügt'] for voice and piano (1816?, 1st setting)
- D. 363, Song "An Chloen" ['Die Munterkeit ist meinen Wangen'] for voice and piano (1816, fragment)
- D. 368, Song "Jägers Abendlied" ['Im Felde schleich' ich still und wild'] for voice and piano (1816?, 2nd setting; modified version with changes by Johann Michael Vogl)
- D. 371, Song "Klage" ['Trauer umfließt mein Leben'] for voice and piano (1816, 1st anD. 2nd versions; 1st version [formerly D. 292] is a sketch)
- D. 372, Song "An die Natur" ['Süße, heilige Natur'] for voice and piano (1816, 1st anD. 2nd versions)
- D. 373, Song "Lied (Mutter geht durch ihre Kammern)" ['Mutter geht durch ihre Kammern'] for voice and piano (1816?)
- D. 375, Song "Der Tod Oskars" ['Warum öffnest du wieder'] for voice and piano (1816)
- D. 376, Song "Lorma" ['Lorma saß in der Halle von Aldo'] for voice and piano (1816, 2nd setting; fragment)
- D. 381, Song "Morgenlied" ['Die frohe, neubelebte Flur'] for voice and piano (1816)
- D. 382, Song "Abendlied" ['Sanft glänzt die Abendsonne'] for voice and piano (1816)
- D. 388, Song "Laura am Klavier" ['Wenn dein Finger durch die Saiten meistert'] for voice and piano (1816, 1st anD. 2nd versions)
- D. 389, Song "Des Mädchens Klage" ['Der Eichwald braust'] for voice and piano (1816, 3rd setting)
- D. 390, Song "Entzückung an Laura" ['Laura, über diese Welt'] for voice and piano (1816, 1st setting)
- D. 392, Song "Pflügerlied" ['Arbeitsam und wacker'] for voice and piano (1816)
- D. 393, Song "Die Einsiedelei" ['Es rieselt, klar und wehend'] for voice and piano (1816, 2nd setting)
- D. 394, Song "An die Harmonie" ['Schöpferin beseelter Töne!'] for voice and piano, Gesang an die Harmonie (1816)
- D. 396, Song "Gruppe aus dem Tartarus" ['Horch, wie Murmeln des empörten Meeres'] for voice and piano (1816, 1st setting; fragment)
- D. 397, Song "Ritter Toggenburg" ['Ritter, treue Schwesterliebe'] for voice and piano (1816, 1st anD. 2nd versions)
- D. 398, Song "Frühlingslied" ['Die Luft ist blau'] for voice and piano (1816, 2nd setting)
- D. 399, Song "Auf den Tod einer Nachtigall" ['Sie ist dahin'] for voice and piano (1816, 2nd setting)
- D. 400, Song "Die Knabenzeit" ['Wie glücklich, wem das Knabenkleid'] for voice and piano (1816)

===== D. 401 to D. 500 =====
- D. 401, Song "Winterlied" ['Keine Blumen blühn'] for voice and piano (1816)
- D. 402, Song "Der Flüchtling" ['Frisch atmet des Morgens lebendiger Hauch'] for voice and piano (1816)
- D. 403, Song "Lied (In's stille Land)" ['In's stille Land'] for voice and piano (1816, 1st, 2nd, 3rd anD. 4th versions; the 1st edition of the 1st version has a four-measure introduction composed by Anton Diabelli)
- D. 404, Song "Die Herbstnacht" ['Mit leisen Harfentönen'] for voice and piano, Die Wehmuth (1816, 1st anD. 2nd versions)
- D. 405, Song "Der Herbstabend" ['Abendglockenhalle zittern'] for voice and piano (1816, 1st anD. 2nd versions)
- D. 406, Song "Abschied von der Harfe" ['Noch einmal tön, o Harfe'] for voice and piano (1816, 1st anD. 2nd versions)
- D. 409, Song "Die verfehlte Stunde" ['Quälend ungestilltes Sehnen'] for voice and piano (1816, 1st anD. 2nd versions)
- D. 411, Song "Daphne am Bach" ['Ich hab' ein Bächlein funden'] for voice and piano (1816)
- D. 412, Song "Stimme der Liebe (Meine Selinde)" ['Meine Selinde'] for voice and piano (1816, 1st anD. 2nd versions)
- D. 413, Song "Entzückung" ['Tag voll Himmel!'] for voice and piano (1816)
- D. 414, Song "Geist der Liebe" ['Der Abend schleiert Flur und Hain'] for voice and piano (1816, 1st setting)
- D. 415, Song "Klage" ['Die Sonne steigt, die Sonne sinkt'] for voice and piano (1816)
- D. 416, Song "Lied in der Abwesenheit" ['Ach, mir ist das Herz so schwer'] for voice and piano (1816, fragment)
- D. 418, Song "Stimme der Liebe (Abendgewölke)" ['Abendgewölke schweben hell'] for voice and piano, Abendgewölke (1816, 2nd setting)
- D. 419, Song "Julius an Theone" ['Nimmer, nimmer darf ich dir gestehen'] for voice and piano (1816)
- D. 429, Song "Minnelied" ['Holder klingt der Vogelsang'] for voice and piano (1816)
- D. 430, Song "Die frühe Liebe" ['Schon im bunten Knabenkleide'] for voice and piano (1816, 1st anD. 2nd versions)
- D. 431, Song "Blumenlied" ['Es ist ein halbes Himmelreich'] for voice and piano (1816)
- D. 432, Song "Der Leidende" ['Nimmer trag' ich langer'] for voice and piano, Klage (1816, 1st, 2nd anD. 3rd versions)
- D. 433, Song "Seligkeit" ['Freuden sonder Zahl'] for voice and piano (1816)
- D. 434, Song "Erntelied" ['Sicheln Schallen, Ähren fallen'] for voice and piano (1816)
- D. 436, Song "Klage" ['Dein Silber schien durch Eichengrün'] for voice and piano (1816; 1st anD. 2nd versions, in addition to a variant of the 1st version; 2nd version was formerly D. 437)
- D. 442, Song "Das große Halleluja" ['Ehre sei dem Hocherhabnen']; version for voice and piano (1816)
- D. 443, Song "Schlachtlied" ['Mit unserm Arm ist nichts getan']; version for voice and piano, Schlachtgesang (1816, 1st setting)
- D. 444, Song "Die Gestirne" ['Es tönet sein Lob'] for voice and piano (1816)
- D. 445, Song "Edone" ['Dein süßes Bild, Edone'] for voice and piano (1816)
- D. 446, Song "Die Liebesgötter" ['Cypris, meiner Phyllis gleich'] for voice and piano (1816)
- D. 447, Song "An den Schlaf" ['Komm und senke die umflorten Schwingen'] for voice and piano (1816)
- D. 448, Song "Gott im Frühlinge" ['In seinem schimmernden Gewand'] for voice and piano (1816, 1st anD. 2nd versions)
- D. 449, Song "Der gute Hirt" ['Was sorgest du?'] for voice and piano (1816, original and modified versions)
- D. 450, Song "Fragment aus dem Aeschylus" ['So wird der Mann'] for voice and piano (1816, 1st anD. 2nd versions)
- D. 454, Song "Grablied auf einen Soldaten" ['Zieh hin, du braver Krieger du!'] for voice and piano (1816)
- D. 455, Song "Freude der Kinderjahre" ['Freude, die im frühen Lenze'] for voice and piano (1816)
- D. 456, Song "Das Heimweh (Oft in einsam stillen Stunden)" ['Oft in einsam stillen Stunden'] for voice and piano (1816)
- D. 458, Song "Aus Diego Manazares. Ilmerine" ['Wo irrst du durch einsame Schatten'] for voice and piano (1816, also appears as "Aus Diego Manzanares")
- D. 462, Song "An Chloen" ['Bei der Liebe reinsten Flammen'] for voice and piano (1816)
- D. 463, Song "Hochzeit-Lied" ['Will singen euch im alten Ton'] for voice and piano (1816)
- D. 464, Song "In der Mitternacht" ['Todesstille deckt das Tal'] for voice and piano (1816)
- D. 465, Song "Trauer der Liebe" ['Wo die Taub' in stillen Buchen'] for voice and piano (1816, 1st anD. 2nd versions)
- D. 466, Song "Die Perle" ['Es ging ein Mann zur Frühlingszeit'] for voice and piano (1816)
- D. 467, Song "Pflicht und Liebe" ['Du, der ewig um mich trauert'] for voice and piano (1816, fragment)
- D. 468, Song "An den Mond" ['Was schauest du so hell'] for voice and piano (1816)
- D. 469, Song "Mignon (So laßt mich scheinen, bis ich werde)" ['So laßt mich scheinen, bis ich werde'] for voice and piano (1816, 1st setting; 1st anD. 2nd versions; both are fragments)
- D. 473, Song "Liedesend" ['Auf seinem gold'nen Throne'] for voice and piano (1816, 1st anD. 2nd versions)
- D. 474, Song "Lied des Orpheus, als er in die Hölle ging" ['Wälze dich hinweg'] for voice and piano (1816, 1st anD. 2nd versions)
- D. 475, Song "Abschied" ['Über die Berge zieht ihr fort'] for voice and piano (1816, also appears as "Abschied. Nach einer Wallfahrts-Arie bearbeitet")
- D. 476, Song "Rückweg" ['Zum Donaustrom, zur Kaiserstadt'] for voice and piano (1816)
- D. 477, Song "Alte Liebe rostet nie" ['Alte Liebe rostet nie'] for voice and piano (1816)
- D. 478, Song cycle Gesänge des Harfners aus "Wilhelm Meister" for voice and piano

1. "Wer sich der Einsamkeit ergibt", Harfenspieler I (1816, 2nd setting; 1st version and modifieD. 2nd version)
2. "Wer nie sein Brot mit Tränen aß", Harfenspieler III [formerly D. 480] (1816; 1st anD. 2nd settings, in addition to a modified version of the 3rd setting)
3. "An die Türen will ich schleichen", Harfenspieler II [formerly D. 479] (1816, 1st version and modifieD. 2nd version)

- D. 481, Song "Sehnsucht" ['Nur wer die Sehnsucht kennt'] for voice and piano, Lied der Mignon (1816, 3rd setting)
- D. 482, Song "Der Sänger am Felsen" ['Klage, meine Flöte, klage'] for voice and piano (1816)
- D. 483, Song "Lied (Ferne von der großen Stadt)" ['Ferne von der großen Stadt'] for voice and piano (1816)
- D. 484, Song "Gesang der Geister über den Wassern" ['Des Menschen Seele gleicht dem Wasser'] for voice and piano (1816, 1st setting; fragment)
- D. 489, Song "Der Wanderer" ['Ich komme vom Gebirge her'] for voice and piano, Der Unglückliche (1816, 1st anD. 2nd versions; 2nd version was formerly D. 493)
- D. 490, Song "Der Hirt" ['Du Turm, zu meinem Leide'] for voice and piano (1816)
- D. 491, Song "Geheimnis" ['Sag an, wer lehrt dich Lieder'] for voice and piano (1816)
- D. 492, Song "Zum Punsche" ['Woget brausend, Harmonien'] for voice and piano (1816)
- D. 495, Song "Abendlied der Fürstin" ['Der Abend rötet nun das Tal'] for voice and piano (1816)
- D. 496, Song "Bei dem Grabe meines Vaters" ['Friede sei um diesen Grabstein her!'] for voice and piano (1816)
- D. 496A, Song "Klage um Ali Bey" ['Laßt mich! Laßt mich! ich will klagen'] for voice and piano (1816, 2nd version)
- D. 499, Song "Abendlied" ['Der Mond is aufgegangen'] for voice and piano (1816)
- D. 500, Song "Phidile" ['Ich war erst sechzehn Sommer alt'] for voice and piano (1816)

===== D. 501 to D. 600 =====
- D. 501, Song "Zufriedenheit" ['Ich bin vergnügt'] for voice and piano (1816, 2nd setting; 1st anD. 2nd versions)
- D. 502, Song "Herbstlied" ['Bunt sind schon die Wälder'] for voice and piano (1816)
- D. 503, Song "Mailied" ['Grüner wird die Au'] for voice and piano (1816, 3rd setting)
- D. 504, Song "Am Grabe Anselmos" ['Daß ich dich verloren habe'] for voice and piano (1816, 2nd version)
- D. 507, Song "Skolie" ['Mädchen entsiegelten, Brüder, die Flaschen'] for voice and piano (1816)
- D. 508, Song "Lebenslied" ['Kommen und Scheiden'] for voice and piano (1816)
- D. 509, Song "Leiden der Trennung" ['Vom Meere trennt sich die Welle'] for voice and piano (1816, 1st anD. 2nd versions)
- D. 513A, Song "Nur wer die Liebe kennt" ['Nur wer die Liebe kennt'] for voice and piano (1817?, sketch)
- D. 520, Song "Frohsinn" ['Ich bin von lockerem Schlage'] for voice and piano (1817, 1st anD. 2nd versions)
- D. 521, Song "Jagdlied" ['Trarah! Trarah! Wir kehren daheim']; version for voice and piano (1817)
- D. 522, Song "Die Liebe" ['Wo weht der Liebe hoher Geist?'] for voice and piano (1817)
- D. 523, Song "Trost" ['Nimmer lange weil' ich hier'] for voice and piano (1817)
- D. 524, Song "Der Alpenjäger" ['Auf hohen Bergesrücken'] for voice and piano (1817, 1st version)
- D. 527, Song "Schlaflied" ['Es mahnt der Wald'] for voice and piano, Abendlied or Schlummerlied (1817, 1st version)
- D. 532, Song "Das Lied vom Reifen" ['Seht meine lieben Bäume an'] for voice and piano (1817, fragment)
- D. 533, Song "Täglich zu singen" ['Ich danke Gott und freue mich'] for voice and piano (1817)
- D. 534, Song "Die Nacht" ['Die Nacht ist dumpfig und finster'] for voice and piano (1817)
- D. 540, Song "Philoktet" ['Da sitz' ich ohne Bogen'] for voice and piano (1817)
- D. 543, Song "Auf dem See" ['Und frische Nahrung'] for voice and piano (1817, 1st version)
- D. 545, Song "Der Jüngling und der Tod" ['Die Sonne sinkt, o könnt ich'] for voice and piano (1817, 2nd version)
- D. 546, Song "Trost im Liede" ['Braust des Unglücks Sturm empor'] for voice and piano (1817, 1st version)
- D. 547, Song "An die Musik" ['Du holde Kunst'] for voice and piano (1817, 1st version)
- D. 548, Song "Orest" ['Ist dies Tauris'] for voice and piano (1817, also appears as "Orest auf Tauris")
- D. 549, Song "Mahomets Gesang" ['Seht den Felsenquell'] for voice and piano (1817, 1st setting; fragment)
- D. 550, Song "Die Forelle" ['In einem Bächlein helle'] for voice and piano (1816–1821, 1st, 2nd, 3rd anD. 5th versions)
- D. 551, Song "Pax vobiscum" ['Der Friede sei mit euch!'] for voice and piano (1817)
- D. 552, Song "Hänflings Liebeswerbung" ['Ahidi! ich liebe'] for voice and piano (1817, 1st version)
- D. 554, Song "Uraniens Flucht" ['Laßt uns, ihr Himmlischen, ein Fest begehen!'] for voice and piano (1817)
- D. 555, Song ["?"] ['?'] for voice and piano "Liedentwurf in a" (1817?, sketch without text)
- D. 558, Song "Liebhaber in allen Gestalten" ['Ich wollt', ich wär' ein Fisch'] for voice and piano (1817)
- D. 559, Song "Schweizerlied" ['Uf'm Bergli bin i g'sässe'] for voice and piano (1817)
- D. 560, Song "Der Goldschmiedsgesell" ['Es ist doch meine Nachbarin'] for voice and piano (1817)
- D. 561, Song "Nach einem Gewitter" ['Auf den Blumen'] for voice and piano (1817)
- D. 562, Song "Fischerlied" ['Das Fischergewerbe gibt rüstigen Mut!'] for voice and piano (1817, 3rd setting)
- D. 563, Song "Die Einsiedelei" ['Es rieselt, klar und wehend'] for voice and piano (1817, 3rd setting)
- D. 564, Song "Gretchen im Zwinger" ['Ach neige, du Schmerzensreiche'] for voice and piano, Gretchens Bitte (1817, fragment)
- D. 573, Song "Iphigenia" ['Blüht denn hier an Tauris Strande'] for voice and piano (1817, 1st anD. 2nd versions)
- D. 577, Song "Entzückung an Laura" ['Laura, Laura, über diese Welt'] for voice and piano (1817, 2nd setting; 2 fragments of a sketch)
- D. 578, Song "Abschied" ['Lebe wohl! Du lieber Freund!'] for voice and piano (1817)
- D. 579, Song "Der Knabe in der Wiege" ['Er schläft so süß'] for voice and piano (1817, 1st anD. 2nd versions; 2nd version is a fragment)
- D. 579A, Song "Vollendung" ['Wenn ich einst das Ziel errungen habe'] for voice and piano [formerly D. 989] (1817)
- D. 579 B, Song "Die Erde" ['Wenn sanft entzückt mein Auge sieht'] for voice and piano [formerly D. 989A] (1817)
- D. 584, Song "Elysium" ['Vorüber die stöhnende Klage!'] for voice and piano (1817)
- D. 585, Song "Atys" ['Der Knabe seufzt übers grüne Meer'] for voice and piano (1817)
- D. 587, Song "An den Frühling" ['Willkommen, schöner Jüngling!'] for voice and piano (1817, 3rd setting; 1st anD. 2nd versions; 2nd version was formerly D. 245)
- D. 588, Song "Der Alpenjäger" ['Willst du nicht das Lämmlein hüten?'] for voice and piano (1817, 1st version)
- D. 595, Song "Thekla (eine Geisterstimme)" ['Wo ich sei und wo mich hingewendet'] for voice and piano (1817, 2nd setting; 1st version)
- D. 596, Song "Lied eines Kindes" ['Lauter Freude fühl' ich'] for voice and piano (1817, fragment)

===== D. 601 to D. 700 =====
- D. 611, Song "Auf der Riesenkoppe" ['Hoch auf dem Gipfel deiner Gebirge'] for voice and piano (1818)
- D. 614, Song "An den Mond in einer Herbstnacht" ['Freundlich ist dein Antlitz'] for voice and piano (1818)
- D. 616, Song "Grablied für die Mutter" ['Hauche milder, Abendluft'] for voice and piano (1818)
- D. 620, Song "Einsamkeit" ['Gib mir die Fülle der Einsamkeit!'] for voice and piano (1818)
- D. 622, Song "Der Blumenbrief" ['Euch Blümlein will ich senden'] for voice and piano (1818)
- D. 623, Song "Das Marienbild" ['Sei gegrüßt, du Frau der Huld'] for voice and piano (1818)
- D. 626, Song "Blondel zu Marien" ['In düstrer Nacht'] for voice and piano (1818)
- D. 628, Song "Sonett" ['Apollo, lebet noch dein hold Verlangen'] for voice and piano, Sonett I (1818)
- D. 629, Song "Sonett" ['Allein, nachdenklich, wie gelähmt vom Krampfe'] for voice and piano, Sonett II (1818)
- D. 630, Song "Sonett" ['Nunmehr, da Himmel, Erde schweigt'] for voice and piano, Sonett III (1818)
- D. 631, Song "Blanka" ['Wenn mich einsam Lüfte fächeln'] for voice and piano, Das Mädchen (1818)
- D. 632, Song "Vom Mitleiden Mariä" ['Als bei dem Kreuz Maria stand'] for voice and piano (1818)
- D. 636, Song "Sehnsucht" ['Ach, aus dieses Tales Gründen'] for voice and piano (1821?, 2nd setting; 1st anD. 2nd versions)
- D. 638, Song "Der Jüngling am Bache" ['An der Quelle saß der Knabe'] for voice and piano (1819, 3rd setting; 1st version)
- D. 639, Song "Widerschein" ['Fischer harrt am Brückenbogen'] for voice and piano (1820, 1st anD. 2nd versions; 2nd version ['Harrt ein Fischer auf der Brücke'] was formerly D. 949)
- D. 645, Song "Abend" ['Wie ist es denn, daß trüb und schwer'] for voice and piano (1819, fragment of a sketch)
- D. 646, Song "Die Gebüsche" ['Es wehet kühl und leise'] for voice and piano (1819)
- D. 649, Song "Der Wanderer" ['Wie deutlich des Mondes Licht zu mir spricht'] for voice and piano (1819, 1st version)
- D. 650, Song "Abendbilder" ['Still beginnt's im Hain zu tauen'] for voice and piano (1819)
- D. 651, Song "Himmelsfunken" ['Der Odem Gottes weht'] for voice and piano (1819)
- D. 652, Song "Das Mädchen" ['Wie so innig, möcht ich sagen'] for voice and piano (1819, 1st anD. 2nd versions)
- D. 653, Song "Bertas Lied in der Nacht" ['Nacht umhüllt mit wehendem Flügel'] for voice and piano (1819)
- D. 654, Song "An die Freunde" ['Im Wald, im Wald, da grabt mich ein'] for voice and piano (1819)
- D. 658, Song "Geistliches Lied" ['Ich sehe dich in tausend Bildern'] for voice and piano [formerly "Marie"] (1819?)
- D. 659, Song "Hymne" ['Wenige wissen das Geheimnis der Liebe'] for voice and piano (1819; also appears as "Hymne I")
- D. 660, Song "Geistliches Lied" ['Wenn ich ihn nur habe'] for voice and piano (1819; also appears as "Hymne II")
- D. 661, Song "Geistliches Lied" ['Wenn alle untreu werden'] for voice and piano (1819; also appears as "Hymne III")
- D. 662, Song "Geistliches Lied" ['Ich sag' es jedem, daß er lebt'] for voice and piano (1819; also appears as "Hymne IV")
- D. 663, Hymn "Der 13. Psalm" ['Ach Herr, wie lange willst du mein so ganz vergessen?'] for voice and piano (1819, fragment)
- D. 669, Song "Beim Winde" ['Es traümen die Wolken'] for voice and piano (1819)
- D. 670, Song "Die Sternennächte" ['In monderhellten Nächten'] for voice and piano (1819, 1st version)
- D. 671, Song "Trost" ['Hörnerklänge rufen klangend'] for voice and piano (1819)
- D. 672, Song "Nachtstück" ['Wenn über Berge sich der Nebel breitet'] for voice and piano (1819, 1st version)
- D. 673, Song "Die Liebende schreibt" ['Ein Blick von deinen Augen'] for voice and piano (1819, 1st version)
- D. 677, Song "Strophe aus Die Götter Griechenlands" ['Schöne Welt, wo bist du?'] for voice and piano (1819, 1st anD. 2nd versions)
- D. 682, Song "Über allen Zauber Liebe" ['Sie hüpfte mit mir auf grünem Plan'] for voice and piano (1820 anD. 1824, fragment)
- D. 684, Song "Die Sterne" ['Du staunest, o Mensch'] for voice and piano (1820)
- D. 686, Song "Frühlingsglaube" ['Die linden Lüfte sind erwacht'] for voice and piano (1820, 1st anD. 2nd versions)
- D. 687, Song "Nachthymne" ['Hinüber wall' ich'] for voice and piano (1820)
- D. 688, Song cycle Vier Canzonen for voice and piano (1820)

1. "Non t'accostar all'urna"
2. "Guarda, che bianca luna"
3. "Da quel sembiante appresi"
4. "Mio ben, ricordati"

- D. 690, Song "Abendröte" ['Tiefer sinket schon die Sonne'] for voice and piano (1823)
- D. 692, Song "Der Knabe" ['Wenn ich nur ein Vöglein wäre'] for voice and piano (1820)
- D. 693, Song "Der Fluß" ['Wie rein Gesang sich windet'] for voice and piano (1820)
- D. 694, Song "Der Schiffer" ['Friedlich lieg' ich hingegossen'] for voice and piano (1820)
- D. 695, Song "Namenstagslied" ['Vater, schenk' mir diese Stunde'] for voice and piano (1820?)
- D. 698, Song "Des Fräuleins Liebeslauschen" ['Hier unten steht ein Ritter'] for voice and piano (1820)
- D. 699, Song "Der entsühnte Orest" ['Zu meinen Füßen brichst du dich'] for voice and piano (1820)
- D. 700, Song "Freiwilliges Versinken" ['Wohin? o Helios!'] for voice and piano (1820)

===== D. 701 to D. 800 =====
- D. 707, Song "Der zürnenden Diana" ['Ja, spanne nur den Bogen'] for voice and piano (1820, 2nd version, dedicated to Cathinka Buchwieser)
- D. 708, Song "Im Walde" ['Windes Rauschen, Gottes Flügel'] for voice and piano, Waldesnacht (1820)
- D. 711, Song "Lob der Tränen" ['Laue Lüfte, Blumendüfte'] for voice and piano (1818?, 1st version)
- D. 712, Song "Die gefangenen Sänger" ['Hörst du von den Nachtigallen'] for voice and piano (1821)
- D. 713, Song "Der Unglückliche" ['Die Nacht bricht an'] for voice and piano (1821, 1st version)
- D. 715, Song "Versunken" ['Voll Locken kraus ein Haupt so rund'] for voice and piano (1821, 1st anD. 2nd versions)
- D. 720, Song "Suleika I" ['Was bedeutet die Bewegung?'] for voice and piano (1821, 1st version)
- D. 726, Song "Mignon I" ['Heiß mich nicht reden, heiß mich schweigen'] for voice and piano (1821, 1st setting)
- D. 727, Song "Mignon II" ['So laßt mich scheinen, bis ich werde'] for voice and piano (1821, 2nd setting)
- D. 728, Song "Johanna Sebus" ['Der Damm zerreißt'] for voice and piano (1821, fragment)
- D. 732, Opera "Alfonso und Estrella" (1821–1822)

8. Arie: Doch im Getümmel der Schlacht (version for voice and piano)
13. Arie: Wenn ich dich, Holde, sehe (version for voice and piano)

- D. 736, Song "Ihr Grab" ['Dort ist ihr Grab'] for voice and piano (1822?)
- D. 745, Song "Die Rose" ['Es lockte schöne Wärme'] for voice and piano (1822, 2nd version)
- D. 746, Song "Am See" ['In des Sees Wogenspiele'] for voice and piano (1822 or 1823?)
- D. 749, Song "Herrn Josef Spaun, Assessor in Linz" ['Und nimmer schreibst du?'] for voice and piano (1822)
- D. 752, Song "Nachtviolen" ['Nachtviolen, Nachtviolen'] for voice and piano (1822)
- D. 756, Song "Du liebst mich nicht" ['Mein Herz ist zerrissen, du liebst mich nicht!'] for voice and piano (1822, 1st version)
- D. 758, Song "Todesmusik" ['In des Todes Feierstunde'] for voice and piano (1822, 1st version)
- D. 761, Song "Schatzgräbers Begehr" ['In tiefster Erde ruht ein alt Gesetz'] for voice and piano (1822, 1st version)
- D. 762, Song "Schwestergruß" ['Im Mondenschein' wall' ich auf und ab'] for voice and piano (1822)
- D. 764, Song "Der Musensohn" ['Durch Feld und Wald zu schweifen'] for voice and piano (1822, 1st version)
- D. 765, Song "An die Entfernte" ['So hab' ich wirklich dich verloren?'] for voice and piano (1822)
- D. 766, Song "Am Flusse" ['Verfließest, vielgeliebte Lieder'] for voice and piano (1822, 2nd setting)
- D. 767, Song "Willkommen und Abschied" ['Es schlug mein Herz'] for voice and piano (1822, 1st version)
- D. 788, Song "Lied (Des Lebens Tag ist schwer und schwül)" ['Des Lebens Tag ist schwer und schwül'] for voice and piano, Die Mutter Erde (1823)
- D. 789, Song "Pilgerweise" ['Ich bin ein Waller auf der Erde'] for voice and piano (1823)
- D. 792, Song "Vergißmeinnicht" ['Als der Frühling'] for voice and piano (1823)
- D. 794, Song "Der Pilgrim" ['Noch in meines Lebens Lenze'] for voice and piano (1823, 1st version)
- D. 795, Song cycle Die schöne Müllerin for voice and piano (1823)

11. "Mein!" ['Bächlein, laß dein Rauschen sein'] (modified version)
13. "Mit dem grünen Lautenbande" ['Schad' um das schöne grüne Band'] (modified version)
18. "Trockne Blumen" ['Ihr Blümlein alle'] (modified version)
19. "Der Müller und der Bach" ['Wo ein treues Herze'] (modified version)

- D. 799, Song "Im Abendrot" ['Oh, wie schön ist deine Welt'] for voice and piano (1824 or 1825, 1st anD. 2nd versions)

===== D. 801 to D. 900 =====
- D. 805, Song "Der Sieg" ['O unbewölktes Leben!'] for voice and piano (1824)
- D. 806, Song "Abendstern" ['Was weilst du einsam an dem Himmel'] for voice and piano (1824)
- D. 807, Song "Auflösung" ['Verbirg dich, Sonne'] for voice and piano (1824)
- D. 808, Song "Gondelfahrer" ['Es tanzen Mond und Sterne'] for voice and piano (1824, 1st setting)
- D. 827, Song "Nacht und Träume" ['Heil'ge Nacht, du sinkest nieder!'] for voice and piano (1823, 1st version)
- D. 829, Melodrama "Leb' wohl du schöne Erde" ['Leb' wohl du schöne Erde'] for spoken voice and piano (1826, also appears as "Abschied" or "Abschied von der Erde")
- D. 832, Song "Des Sängers Habe" ['Schlagt mein ganzes Glück in Splitter'] for voice and piano (1825)
- D. 833, Song "Der blinde Knabe" ['O sagt, ihr Lieben, mir einmal'] for voice and piano (1825, 1st version and modifieD. 2nd version)
- D. 834, Song "Im Walde" ['Ich wandre über Berg und Tal'] for voice and piano (1825, 1st version)
- D. 842, Song "Totengräbers Heimwehe" ['O Menschheit, o Leben, was soll's?'] for voice and piano (1825)
- D. 851, Song "Das Heimweh" ['Ach, der Gebirgssohn'] for voice and piano (1825, 1st version)
- D. 852, Song "Die Allmacht" ['Groß ist Jehova, der Herr'] for voice and piano (1825, 1st setting; modified version)
- D. 853, Song "Auf der Bruck" ['Frisch trabe sonder Ruh' und Rast'] for voice and piano (1825, 1st version)
- D. 854, Song "Fülle der Liebe" ['Ein sehnend Streben teilt mir das Herz'] for voice and piano (1825)
- D. 855, Song "Wiedersehn" ['Der Frühlingssonne holdes Lächeln'] for voice and piano (1825)
- D. 860, Song "An mein Herz" ['O Herz, sei endlich stille'] for voice and piano (1825)
- D. 861, Song "Der liebliche Stern" ['Ihr Sternlein, still in der Höhe'] for voice and piano (1825)
- D. 862, Song "Um Mitternacht" ['Keine Stimme hör' ich schallen'] for voice and piano (1825 anD. 1826?, 1st version)
- D. 863, Song "An Gott" ['Kein Auge hat dein Angesicht geschaut'] for voice and piano (1827 or earlier, lost)
- D. 864, Song "Das Totenhemdchen" ['Starb das Kindlein'] for voice and piano (after 1824, lost)
- D. 869, Song "Totengräber-Weise" ['Nicht so düster und so bleich'] for voice and piano (1826)
- D. 871, Song "Das Zügenglöcklein" ['Kling die Nacht durch, klinge'] for voice and piano (1826, 1st version)
- D. 874, Song "O Quell, was strömst du rasch und wild" ['O Quell, was strömst du rasch und wild'] for voice and piano (1826?, sketch)
- D. 876, Song "Im Jänner 1817" ['Ich bin von aller Ruh' geschieden'] for voice and piano, Tiefes Leid (1826)
- D. 877, Song cycle Gesänge aus "Wilhelm Meister" (1826)

2. "Lied der Mignon" ['Heiß mich nicht reden, heiß mich schweigen'] for voice and piano (2nd setting, modified version)

- D. 881, Song "Fischerweise" ['Den Fischer fechten Sorgen und Gram und Leid nicht an'] for voice and piano (1826, 1st version)
- D. 882, Song "Im Frühling" ['Still sitz' ich an des Hügels Hang'] for voice and piano (1826, 1st version)
- D. 883, Song "Lebensmut" ['O wie dringt das junge Leben'] for voice and piano (1826)
- D. 888, Song "Trinklied" ['Bacchus, feister Fürst des Weins'] for voice and piano (1826)
- D. 889, Song "Ständchen" ['Horch, horch! die Lerch im Ätherblau'] for voice and piano (1826)
- D. 890, Song "Hippolits Lied" ['Laßt mich, ob ich auch still verglüh'] for voice and piano (1826)
- D. 891, Song "An Sylvia" ['Was ist Sylvia?'] for voice and piano (1826)
- D. 896, Song "Fröhliches Scheiden" ['Gar fröhlich kann ich scheiden'] for voice and piano (1827–1828, sketch)
- D. 896A, Song "Sie in jedem Liede" ['Nehm ich die Harfe'] for voice and piano (1827–1828, sketch)
- D. 896B, Song "Wolke und Quelle" ['Auf meinen heimischen Bergen'] for voice and piano (1827–1828, sketch)

===== D. 901 to D. 998 =====
- D. 906, Song "Der Vater mit dem Kind" ['Dem Vater liegt das kind in Arm'] for voice and piano (1827)
- D. 907, Song "Romanze des Richard Löwenherz" ['Großer Taten tat der Ritter fern im heiligen Lande viel'] for voice and piano (1826?, 1st version)
- D. 910, Song "Schiffers Scheidelied" ['Die Wogen am Gestade schwellen'] for voice and piano (1827)
- D. 911, Song cycle Winterreise for voice and piano (1827)

7. "Auf dem Flusse" ['Der du so lustig rauschtest'] (1st version)
10. "Rast" ['Nun merk' ich erst, wie müd ich bin'] (1st version)
11. "Frühlingstraum" ['Ich träumte von bunten Blumen'] (1st version)
22. "Mut" ['Fliegt der Schnee mir ins Gesicht'] (1st version)
23. "Die Nebensonnen" ['Drei Sonnen sah ich'] (1st version)

- D. 916A, Song ["?"] ['?'] for voice and piano "Liedentwurf in C" (1827?, sketch without text)
- D. 919, Song "Frühlingslied" ['Geöffnet sind des Winters Riegel'] for voice and piano (1827?, 2nd setting)
- D. 922, Song "Heimliches Lieben" ['O du, wenn deine Lippen mich berühren'] for voice and piano (1827, 1st version)
- D. 923, Song "Eine altschottische Ballade" ['Dein Schwert, wie ist's von Blut so rot'] for voice and piano, Edward (1827; 2nd version in addition to 3rd version for male voice, female voice and piano)
- D. 931, Song "Der Wallensteiner Lanzknecht beim Trunk" ['He! schenket mir im Helme ein!'] for voice and piano (1827)
- D. 932, Song "Der Kreuzzug" ['Ein Münich steht in seiner Zell'] for voice and piano (1827)
- D. 933, Song "Des Fischers Liebesglück" ['Dort blinket durch Weiden'] for voice and piano (1827)
- D. 937, Song "Lebensmut" ['Fröhlicher Lebensmut braust in dem raschen Blut'] for voice and piano (1828?, fragment)
- D. 938, Song "Der Winterabend" ['Es ist so still, so heimlich um mich'] for voice and piano (1828)
- D. 945, Song "Herbst" ['Es rauschen die Winde so herbstlich und kalt'] for voice and piano (1828)
- D. 957, Song cycle 13 Lieder nach Gedichten von Rellstab und Heine for voice and piano (1828, also appears as "Schwanengesang")

1. "Liebesbotschaft" ['Rauschendes Bächlein, so silber und hell']
2. "Kriegers Ahnung" ['In tiefer Ruh liegt um mich her']
3. "Frühlingssehnsucht" ['Säuselnde Lüfte wehen so mild']
4. "Ständchen" ['Leise flehen meine Lieder'], Serenade (original and modified versions)
5. "Aufenthalt" ['Rauschender Strom, brausender Wald']
6. "In der Ferne" ['Wehe dem Fliehenden']
7. "Abschied" ['Ade! du muntre, du fröhliche Stadt']
8. "Der Atlas" ['Ich unglückselger Atlas']
9. "Ihr Bild" ['Ich stand in dunkeln Träumen']
10. "Das Fischermädchen" ['Du schönes Fischermädchen']
11. "Die Stadt" ['Am fernen Horizonte']
12. "Am Meer" ['Das Meer erglänzte weit hinaus']
13. "Der Doppelgänger" ['Still ist die Nacht, es ruhen die Gassen']

- D. 965A, Song "Die Taubenpost" ['Ich hab' eine Brieftaub in meinem Sold'] for voice and piano [formerly D. 957 No. 14] (1828)
- D. 990, Song "Der Graf von Habsburg" ['Zu Aachen in seiner Kaiserpracht'] for voice and piano (date unknown)
- D. 990A, Song "Kaiser Maximilian auf der Martinswand" ['Hinauf! hinauf! in Sprung und Lauf'] for voice and piano (date unknown, also appears as "Kaiser Maximilian auf der Martinswand in Tirol")
- D. 990B, Song "Augenblicke im Elysium" ['Vor der in Ehrfurcht all mein Wesen kniet'] for voice and piano [formerly D. 582] (date unknown, lost)
- D. 990D, Song "Die Schiffende" ['Sie wankt dahin; die Abendwinde spielen'] for voice and piano (1815?, lost)

===== Appendix and missing works =====
- D Anh. II,3, Arrangement of Two Arias from the Opera Echo et Narcisse ['Rien de la nature'; 'O combats, o désordre extrème!'] for voice and piano (1816, compositions by Christoph Willibald Gluck)
- D deest, Song "?" ['?'] improvised for a play for voice and piano (1815?, lost?; possibly identical to D. 284)
- D deest, Song "?" ['?'] in C major for voice and piano (1816, fragment)
- D deest, Song "Winterlied" ['Das Glas gefüllt!'] for voice and piano, Winterabend (after 1820; 2nd setting of D. 242, with a different title; also appears unofficially listed as D. 242A or D. 324A)
- D deest, Song "?" ['?'] for voice and piano (ca. 1827, fragment; lost)

== Vocal composition exercises ==
- D. 17, Composition exercises on "Quell' innocente figlio" ['Quell' innocente figlio'] for various vocal ensembles, Arie dell' Angelo (1812?, also appears as "Aria dell' Angelo"; 9 settings; No. 1 Solo for soprano; No. 2 Duo for two sopranos; No. 3 Trio for soprano, alto and tenor; No. 4 Quartet for soprano, alto, tenor and bass; No. 5 Trio for soprano, alto and tenor; No. 6 Trio for soprano, alto and tenor; No. 7 Quartet for soprano, alto, tenor and bass; No. 8 Quartet for soprano, alto, tenor and bass; No. 9 Quartet for soprano, alto, tenor and bass)
- D. 33, Composition exercises on "Entra l'uomo allor che nasce" ['Entra l'uomo allor che nasce'] for various vocal ensembles, Aria di Abramo (1812, also appears as "Aria di Abramo"; 6 settings; No. 1 for soprano; No. 2 Duo for soprano and alto; No. 3 Trio for soprano, alto and tenor; No. 4 Quartet for soprano, alto, tenor and bass; No. 5 Quartet for soprano, alto, tenor and bass; No. 6 Quartet for soprano, alto, tenor and bass)
- D. 34, Composition exercises on "Te solo adoro" ['Te solo adoro'] for soprano, alto, tenor and bass (1812, 2 settings; 2nd setting is a fragment)
- D. 35, Composition exercises on "Serbate, o Dei custodi" ['Serbate, o Dei custodi'] for various vocal ensembles (1812, 3 settings; No. 1 Quartet for soprano, alto tenor and bass; No. 2 Chorus for mixed choir; No. 3 Solo for tenor)
- D. 619, Vocal exercises for two voices and figured bass "Singübungen" (1818, figured bass usually realized for piano)
- D deest, Canon ["?"] ['?'] in C major for five voices (1826?)

== Vocal works, fragments and sketches of unknown genre ==
- D. 988A, Accompaniment part in B-flat major for piano (after 1820, fragment; for a multi-part vocal composition?)
- D deest, Sketch of a composition "?" ['?'] for unspecified voices and orchestra (1811?, sketch)
- D deest, Aria "?" ['?'] for bass and piano (?) (1812, sketch; also appears as "Allegretto in D major")
- D deest, Vocal composition "?" ['?'] for mixed choir (?) (1818?, fragment without text)
- D deest, Accompaniment for a vocal composition "?" ['?'] (1821?, fragment)
- D deest, Vocal composition "?" ['?'] for unspecified voices (1821?, fragment)
- D deest, Fragment of a cantata (?) "?" ['?'] for unspecified soloists, choir and orchestra (date unknown, fragment without text)
- D deest, Song (?) "...doch stärker ist die Mutterliebe" ['?'] for voice (?) and orchestra (date unknown, fragment; lost)
- D deest, Song (?) or piano piece (?) "Lieder für das Pianoforte" ['?'] for voice (?) and/or piano (?) (date unknown, lost)

== Spurious works ==
- D Anh. I,25, Cantata "Drum Schwester und Brüder" ['Drum Schwester und Brüder singt fröhliche Lieder'] for voice (?), choir, violin, violoncello and other unknown instruments (1819, fragment; only violin and violoncello parts are extant)
- D Anh. I,26, Trio or Quartet "Sturmbeschwörung" ['Nirgends Rettung, nirgends Land'] for two sopranos and alto (?) or two sopranos and two altos (?) (date unknown, fragment; only one soprano part is extant)
- D Anh. I,28, Song "Klage (Nimmer länger trag ich)" ['Nimmer länger trag ich dieser Leiden Last'] for voice and piano, Nimmer länger trag ich [formerly D. 512] (ca. 1817, presumably not by Schubert)
- D Anh. I,29, Song " Kaiser Ferdinand II." ['Was reget die Stadt sich in freudiger Hast?'] for voice and piano (1809?, doubtful)
- D deest, Trio "Scherz-Terzett" ['Mala musica, bona musica?'] for three altos (1812, doubtful)
- D deest, Song "Die Nacht" ['Die Nacht bricht an, mit leisen Lüften sinket'] for voice and guitar (after 1816?, doubtful; accompaniment part by Franz Xaver Baron von Schlechta; voice part by Schubert?)
- D deest, Song (?) "Seliges Genügen" ['?'] for unspecified voice(s)/instrument(s) (date unknown, lost)

== Vocal works in the catalogue by other composers ==
- D Anh. I,27, Song "Drei Chöre mit Bläsern" ['Lieblich ist, wenn sanftes Grau; Leb wohl, geliebte Freundin; O Zeit, wie manchen herben Schmerz'] for male choir, two horns and two bassoons (date unknown, fragment; not by Schubert)
- D Anh. I,30, Song "Mein Frieden" ['Ferne, ferne flammen helle Sterne'] for voice and piano (pub. 1823, composition by Franz Anton Schubert)
- D Anh. I,31, Song "Adieu! (Lebe wohl!)" ['Voici l'instant suprême; Schon naht, um uns zu scheiden'] for voice and piano (pub. 1824, composition by August Heinrich von Weyrauch)
- D Anh. III,1, Nine Canons "Neun Kanons" ['Es packe dich das Glück beim Kragen; Vom Glück sei alles dir beschert; Glück fehl dir vor allem; Wohlsein und Freude; Drum habe Dank, o Vater Hayden; Adam hat siebn Söhn; Cato, Plato, Cicero; Was i beim Tag mit der Leiern gwinn; Alleluia'] for four or more voices (ca. 1810 copy; compositions by Michael Haydn, Joseph Haydn, Josef Otter, Wolfgang Amadeus Mozart and anonymous composers)
- D Anh. III,2, Song "Die Teilung der Erde" ['Nehmt hin die Welt! rief Zeus aus seinen Höhen'] for voice and piano (ca. 1810 copy; composition by Franz de Paula Roser)
- D Anh. III,4, Canon "Kanon (Hoffnung Kind des Himmels)" ['Hoffnung Kind des Himmels'] from the Singspiel "Elbondocani" for two sopranos, tenor, bass and piano (1813? copy; composition by Johann Rudolf Zumsteeg)
- D Anh. III,5, Trio "Chor der Derwische" ['Ein Gott, ein wahrer Gott ist nur'] for two tenors and bass (1813? copy; composition by Johann Rudolf Zumsteeg)
- D Anh. III,7, Scene "Monolog aus Goethes Iphigenie" ['Heraus in eure Schatten'] for voice, women's choir and piano ['Heraus in eure Schatten'] (1815 copy; composition by Johann Friedrich Reichardt)
- D Anh. III,9, Song "Deutsches Hochamt (Hier liegt vor deiner Majestät)" for voice and organ (copy of the organ part lost; composition by Michael Haydn)
- D Anh. III,11, Canon "Laß immer in der Jugend Glanz" ['Laß immer in der Jugend Glanz'], K. 410/Anh. 134/440d/484d (score), for two voices [formerly D. 92] (copy lost; composition by Wolfgang Amadeus Mozart)
- D Anh. III,12, Canon "Selig alle, die im Herrn entschliefen" ['Selig alle, die im Herrn entschliefen'], K. 382b, for two voices [formerly D. 127] (copy lost; composition by Wolfgang Amadeus Mozart)
- D Anh. III,13, Song "Abendlied unterm gestirnten Himmel" ['Wenn die Sonne niedersinket'], WoO 150, for voice and piano (1820 copy; composition by Ludwig van Beethoven)

== Sources ==
- Franz Schubert's Works (various editors and editions)
- Schubert Thematic Catalogue (various editions)
- Neue Schubert-Ausgabe (various editors and publication dates)
- Eva Badura-Skoda and Peter Branscombe. Schubert Studies: Problems of Style and Chronology. Cambridge University Press, 1982. Reprint 2008. ISBN 0521088720 ISBN 9780521088725 ISBN 9780521226066
- Brian Newbould. Schubert: The Music and the Man. University of California Press, 1999. ISBN 0520219570 ISBN 9780520219571
- Reed, John (1997). The Schubert Song Companion. Manchester University Press. ISBN 1-901341-00-3.
- Reinhard Van Hoorickx. "Franz Schubert (1797–1828) List of the Dances in Chronological Order" in Revue belge de Musicologie/Belgisch Tijdschrift voor Muziekwetenschap, Vol. 25, No. 1/4, pp. 68–97, 1971
- Reinhard Van Hoorickx. "Thematic Catalogue of Schubert's Works: New Additions, Corrections and Notes" in Revue belge de Musicologie/Belgisch Tijdschrift voor Muziekwetenschap, Vol. 28/30, pp. 136–171, 1974–1976.
