= Georg Philipp Schmidt von Lübeck =

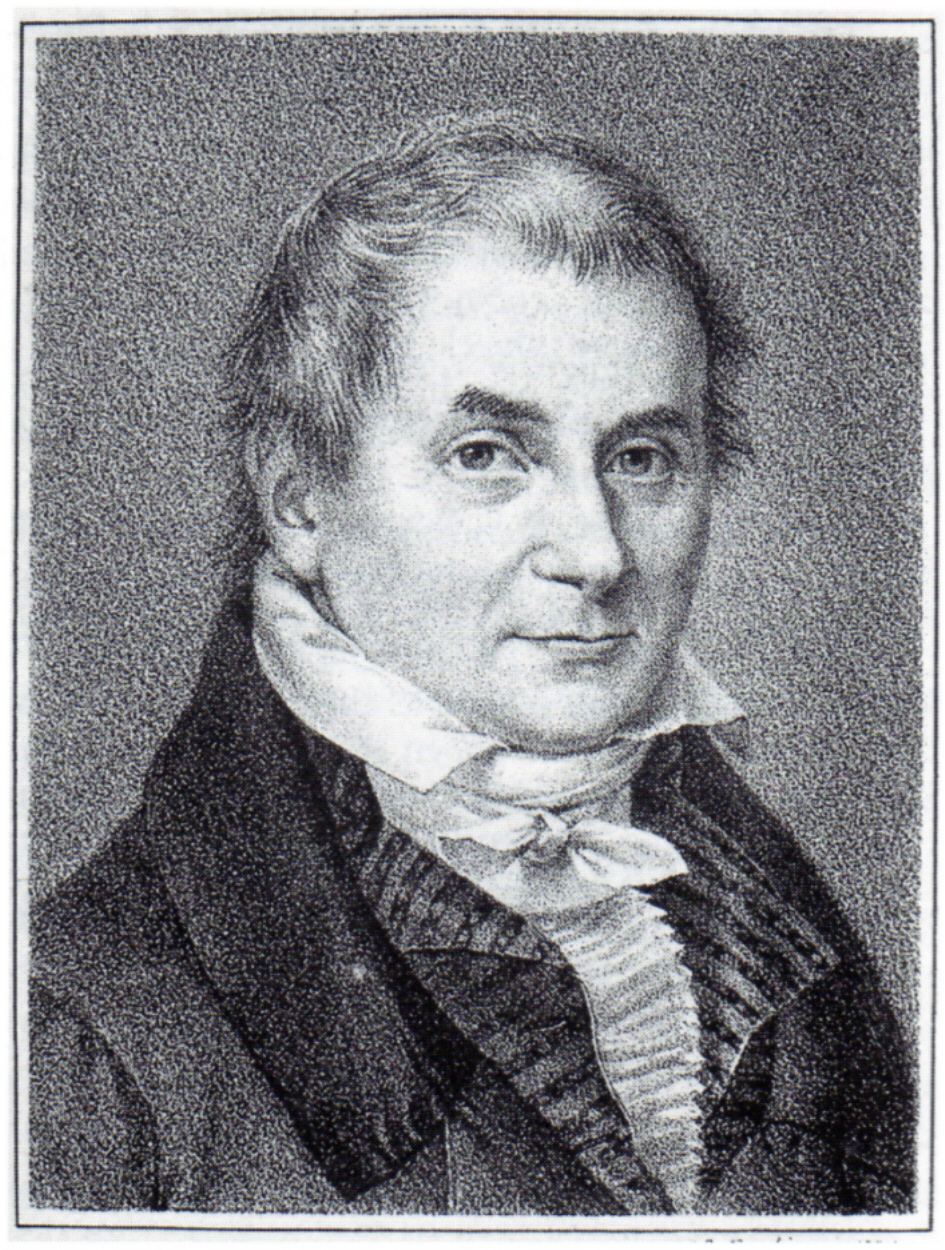
Georg Philipp Schmidt von Lübeck

Georg Philipp Schmidt von Lübeck (January 1, 1766 – October 28, 1849) was a German poet.

He was born in Lübeck as member of a merchant family with long tradition. He studied law in Jena and Göttingen 1786 to 1790, then he changed to theology and in the end to medicine. In Jena he made friends with the writers Sophie Mereau and Johann Gottfried Herder. After some journeys through Germany he worked as civil servant for the Danish government until 1829.

His most famous poem is Der Wanderer. It was set to music by Franz Schubert.
