= List of compositions by Franz Schubert (1816) =

Franz Schubert's compositions of 1816 are mostly in the Deutsch catalogue (D) range D 331–510, and include:

- Instrumental works:
  - Symphony No. 4, D 417
  - Symphony No. 5, D 485
  - Rondo in A major for Violin and Strings, D 438
  - Adagio and Rondo concertante in F major, D 487
  - String Quartet No. 11, D 353
  - String Trio, D 471
  - Piano Sonata in E major, D 459
- Vocal music:
  - Mass No. 4, D 452
  - Magnificat, D 486
  - Stabat Mater in F minor, D 383
  - Gesänge des Harfners aus "Wilhelm Meister", D 478
  - "Sehnsucht", D 359
  - "Der König in Thule", D 367
  - "Mignon", D 469
  - "Sehnsucht", D 481
  - "Der Wanderer", D 489
  - "Wiegenlied", D 498

== Table ==
=== Legend ===
Legend to the table
column		content
1	D '51	Deutsch number in the first version of the Deutsch catalogue (1951)
2	D utd	most recent (utd = up to date) Deutsch catalogue number; the basic collation of the list is according to these numbers – whether or not the possibility to adjust the sorting according to the content of other columns is available depends on the device with which the table is displayed.
3	Op. pbl	Opus number (Op.; p indicates Post. = posthumous) and date of first publication (pbl; between brackets; when there is more than one date the earlier dates indicate partial publications). The column sorts to Opus number, then (earliest of) the publication date(s)
4	AGA	Alte Gesamt-Ausgabe = Franz Schubert's Werke: Kritisch durchgesehene Gesammtausgabe. Indicates genre/instrumentation: Series I: Symphonien (Nos. 1-8) (Johannes Brahms, 1884); Series II: Overtüren und Andere Orchesterwerke (Johann Nepomuk Fuchs, 1886); Series III: Oktette (Nos. 1-3) and IV: Streichquintett (Eusebius Mandyczewski, 1889); Series V: Streichquartette (Nos. 1-15) (Joseph Hellmesberger and Eusebius Mandyczewski, 1890); Series VI: Trio für Streichinstrumente (Eusebius Mandyczewski, 1892); Series VII: Trios, Quartets and Quintets with Piano and VIII: Pianoforte und Ein Instrument (Ignaz Brüll, 1886); Series IX: Pianoforte zu vier Händen (Anton Door, 1888); Series X: Sonaten für Pianoforte (Julius Epstein, 1888); Series XI: Fantasie, Impromptus und andere Stücke für Pianoforte (Julius Epstein, 1888); Series XII: Tänze für Pianoforte (Nos. 1-31) (Julius Epstein, 1889); Series XIII: Messen (Nos. 1-7) (Eusebius Mandyczewski, 1887); Series XIV: Kleinere Kirchenmusikwerke (Nos. 1-22) (Eusebius Mandyczewski, 1888); Series XV: Dramatische Musik (Johann Nepomuk Fuchs, 1893); Series XVI: Werke für Männerchor (Nos. 1-46) (Eusebius Mandyczewski, 1891); Series XVII: Werke für gemischten Chor (Nos. 1-19) (Josef Gänsbacher, Eusebius Mandyczewski, 1892); Series XVIII: Werke für Drei und mehr Frauenstimmen mit Pianoforte-Begleitung (Nos. 1-6) (Josef Gänsbacher, Eusebius Mandyczewski, 1891); Series XIX: Kleine Gesangswerke (Nos. 1-36) (Josef Gänsbacher and Eusebius Mandyczewski, 1892); Series XX: Sämtliche einstimmige Lieder und Gesänge (Eusebius Mandyczewski, 1894-1895); Series XXI: Supplement (Eusebius Mandyczewski, 1897); 1. Instrumentalmusik No. 1-5; 2. Instrumentalmusik No. 6-13; 3. Instrumentalmusik No. 14-; 4. Gesangsmusik; Series XXII: Revisionsbericht
5	NSA	NGA/NSA/NSE = New Schubert Edition, also indicates genre/instrumentation: Series I: Church Music; Series II: Stage Works; Series III: Part Songs; Series IV: Lieder; Series V: Orchestral Works; Series VI: Chamber Music; 1. Octet and Nonet; 2. String Quintet; 3. String Quartets I; 4. String Quartets II; 5. String Quartets III; 6. String Trios; 7. Works for Piano and several instruments; 8. Works for Piano and one instrument; 9. Dances for several instruments; Series VII: Piano Music; 1. Works for Piano Four Hands; 2. Works for Piano Two Hands; Series VIII: Supplement, 2. Schubert's Studies
6	Name	unique name, with, if available, a link to the relevant encyclopedia article; sorts by name with initial definite ("Der", "Die", "Das", ...) or indefinite ("Ein", "A", ...) articles, and numbers, moved after the expression they qualify: e.g. "Die Hoffnung, ..." sorts as "Hoffnung, Die, ..." – "Thirty Minuets ..." sorts as "Minuets, 30, ...".
7	Key / incipit	incipit mostly for songs (linking to lyrics and their translation, for instance at The LiederNet Archive, when available), other compositions by key, except for Schubert's stage works: type of composition in brackets.
8	Date	(presumed) date of composition, or, for copies and arrangements, date of Schubert's autograph. Sorts to earliest possible date of completion, unlike the chronology of the Deutsch catalogue that generally collates according to earliest date associated with the composition: e.g. Schubert started the composition of his 3rd String Quartet on 19 November 1812 and completed it on 21 February 1813 – in the Deutsch catalogue the composition is grouped with other compositions from 1812: when using the sort function of the 8th column the composition is grouped with compositions completed in 1813
9	Additional info	may include: Information about the text (lyrics, libretto) of vocal compositions: e.g., "Text by [text author]", "Text: [standard lyrics]", "... from [literary work]"; "other settings: D ..." indicates Schubert's other settings of the same text; for fields starting with "Text ..." this column sorts by text author (last name, first name—or pen name when such name is more established), then incipit of the lyrics (alternatively, when the incipit is rarely used, title of the work); Information about the authenticity of the composition: the work is without doubt Schubert's unless when marked as "Doubtful", "Spurious?" or "Spurious" (in the last case columns 3–8 give no further information about the composition); Forces needed for performance ("For ..."): may be omitted when the type of composition makes the instrumentation clear (e.g. String Quartet → two violins, viola and cello), and, for vocal music, when the setting is for voice and piano; "s", "a", "t" and "b" refer to a single soprano, alto, tenor and bass singer respectively, while "S", "A", "T" and "B" to choral parts for the same types of singers (see SATB).; Specifications regarding movements (e.g. "Allegro – Minuet – Rondo") or sections (e.g. "No. 1 ..."); Information about the completeness of the extant work: the work is considered complete as extant unless when marked "Sketch", "Incomplete", "Unfinished", "Fragment" or "Lost"; Information about versions (e.g. "Two versions: ...")

=== List ===
Compositions by Franz Schubert listed in the Deutsch catalogue for 1816
D '51	D utd	Op. pbl	AGA	NSA	Name	Key / incipit	Date	Additional info
331; 332	331	(1866)	XVI; No. 38	III, 4 No. 31	Der Entfernten, D 331	Wohl denk' ich allenthalben	c. 1816	Text by Salis-Seewis (other setting: D 350); For ttbb; Identical to former D 332
333	796				Laß dein Vertrauen nicht schwinden			Part of D 796 No. 21
334	334	(1897)	XXI, 3 No. 24	VII/2, 4	Minuet with Trio, D 334	A major (minuet) / E major (trio)	before fall 1815	For piano
335	335	(1897)	XXI, 3 No. 25	VII/2, 6	Minuet with two Trios	E major	1813?	For piano
337	337	(1860)	XVI; No. 39	III, 4 No. 32	Die Einsiedelei, D 337, a.k.a. Lob der Einsamkeit	Es rieselt klar und wehend ein Quell	c. 1816	Text by Salis-Seewis (other settings: D 393 and 563); For ttbb
338	338	(1891)	XVI; No. 40	III, 4 No. 33	An den Frühling, D 338	Willkommen, schöner Jüngling!	c. 1816	Text by Schiller (other settings: D 283 and 587); For ttbb
342	342	(1885)	XX, 4 No. 238	IV, 10	An mein Klavier a.k.a. Seraphine an ihr Klavier	Sanftes Klavier, welche Entzückungen schaffest du mir	c. 1816	Text by Schubart
343	343	(1831)	XX, 5 No. 342	IV, 10	Am Tage Aller Seelen a.k.a. Litanei auf das Fest Aller Seelen	Ruh'n in Frieden alle Seelen	August; 1816	Text by Jacobi; Two versions: 1st, in AGA, publ. in 1831
344	344			IV, 10	Am ersten Maimorgen	Heute will ich fröhlich sein	1816?	Text by Claudius
345	345	(1897)	XXI, 1 No. 3	V, 7 No. 1	Violin Concerto, a.k.a. Konzertstück (Concert Piece)	D major	1816	Adagio, Allegro
346	346	(1897)	XXI, 3 No. 17	VII/2, 4 Anh.	Allegretto, D 346	C major	1816?	For piano; Fragment; 4th movement of D 279?
347	347	(1897)	XXI, 3 No. 18	VII/2, 4 Anh.	Allegro moderato, D 347	C major	1813?	For piano; Fragment
348	348	(1897)	XXI, 3 No. 19	VII/2, 4 Anh.	Andantino, D 348	C major	1816?	For piano; Fragment
349	349	(1897)	XXI, 3 No. 21	VII/2, 4 Anh.	Adagio, D 349	C major	1816?	For piano; Fragment
350	350	(1885)	XX, 4 No. 203	IV, 10	Der Entfernten, D 350	Wohl denk' ich allenthalben	1816?	Text by Salis-Seewis (other setting: D 331)
351	351	(1895)	XX, 4 No. 204	IV, 11	Fischerlied, D 351	Das Fischergewerbe gibt rüstigen Mut	1816?	Text by Salis-Seewis (other settings: D 364 and 562)
352	352	(1847)	XX, 4 No. 286	III, 2b No. 21	Licht und Liebe a.k.a. Nachtgesang	Liebe ist ein süßes Licht	1816?	Text by Collin, M. C.; For st and piano
353	353	125p,2 (1840)	V No. 11	VI, 4 No. 12	String Quartet No. 11	E major	1816	Allegro con fuoco – Andante – Minuet – Rondo
354	354	(1930)		VI, 9	Four Komische Ländler	D major	January; 1816	For two violins
355	355	(1928)		VI, 9	Eight Ländler, D 355	F♯ minor	January; 1816	For violin(?)
356	356	(1844)		III, 3 Anh. II No. 3	Trinklied, D 356	Funkelnd im Becher so helle, so hold	1816	For vocal soloist, TTBB and piano; Piano part lost (by Czerny in 1844 ed.)
357	357	(1892)	XIX; No. 24	III, 4 No. 35; VIII, 2 No. 28	Goldner Schein	Goldner Schein deckt den Hain	1/5/1816	Text by Matthisson; Canon for three voices
358	358	(1849)	XX, 4 No. 235	IV, 10	Die Nacht, D 358	Du verstörst uns nicht, o Nacht!	1816	Text by Uz
359	359	(1872)	XX, 4 No. 260	IV, 3	Sehnsucht, D 359 a.k.a. Lied der Mignon	Nur wer die Sehnsucht kennt	1816	Text by Goethe, from Wilhelm Meister's Apprenticeship (other settings: D 310, 481, 656 and 877 Nos. 1 & 4)
360	360	65,1 (1826)	XX, 4 No. 268	IV, 3	Lied eines Schiffers an die Dioskuren	Dioskuren, Zwillingssterne	1816	Text by Mayrhofer
361	361	109p,1 (1829)	XX, 4 No. 272	IV, 10	Am Bach im Frühling	Du brachst sie nun, die kalte Rinde	1816	Text by Schober; Piano intro probably not by Schubert
362	362	(1895)	XX, 4 No. 280	IV, 11	Zufriedenheit, D 362, a.k.a. Lied	Ich bin vergnugt	1815 or 1816?	Text by Claudius (other setting: D 501)
363	363			IV, 10	An Chloen, D 363	Die Munterkeit ist meinen Wangen	1816	Text by Uz; Fragment
364	364	(1897)	XXI, 4 No. 35	III, 4 No. 34	Fischerlied, D 364	Das Fischergewerbe gibt rüstigen Mut	1816 or 1817?	Text by Salis-Seewis (other settings: D 351 and 562); For ttbb
365	365	9 (1821)	XII; No. 1	VII/2, 6 & 7a	36 Original Dances a.k.a. Erste Walzer	Various keys	c. Mar. 1818– Jul. 1821	For piano; No. 2 publ. in 1826 as Beethoven's (Kinksky Anh. 14 No. 1)
366	366	(1824) (1869)	XII; No. 10	VII/2, 6 & 7a	17 Ländler, D 366	Various keys	c. Jul. 1824– Nov. 1824	For piano; Nos. 6 and 17 publ. in 1824; No. 7 partly reappears in D 618 and No. 17 in D 814
367	367	5,5 (1821)	XX, 4 No. 261	IV, 1a	Der König in Thule	Es war ein König in Thule	early 1816	Text by Goethe, from Faust I, 8
368	368	3,4 (1821)	XX, 4 No. 262	IV, 1a	Jägers Abendlied, D 368	Im Felde schleich ich, still und wild	early 1816?	Text by Goethe (other setting: D 215)
369	369	19,1 (1825)	XX, 4 No. 263	IV, 1a	An Schwager Kronos	Spute dich, Kronos!	1816	Text by Goethe
370	370	(1930)		VI, 9	Nine Ländler, D 370	D major	January; 1816	For violin?; No. 7 reused in D 378 No. 6
371; 292	371	(1872)	XX, 4 No. 185	IV, 10	Klage, D 371	Trauer umfließt mein Leben	January; 1816	Two versions: 1st, a sketch, was D 292
372	372	(1895)	XX, 4 No. 183	IV, 10	An die Natur	Süße, heilige Natur	15/1/1816	Text by Stolberg-Stolberg
373	373	(1895)	XX, 4 No. 184	IV, 10	Lied, D 373	Mutter geht durch ihre Kammern	15/1/1816?	Text by Motte Fouqué, from Undine
374	374	(1902)		VI, 9	11 Ländler, D 374	B♭ major	February; 1816?	For violin; Nos. 1–3, 5, 7 and 11 reused in Nos. 1–5 and 7 of D 378; No. 2 also partly in D 146 No. 10
375	375	(1830)	XX, 4 No. 187	IV, 10	Der Tod Oskars	Warum öffnest du wieder	February; 1816	Text by Macpherson (Ossian), transl. by E. Baron de Harold
376	376	(1895)	XX, 10; No. 592	IV, 10	Lorma, D 376	Lorma saß in der Halle von Aldo	10/2/1816	Text by Macpherson (Ossian), from The Battle of Lora, transl. by E. Baron de Harold (other setting: D 327); Fragment
377	377	(1872)	XX, 4 No. 186	III, 3 No. 21; Anh. I No. 3	Das Grab, D 377	Das Grab ist tief und stille	11/2/1816	Text by Salis-Seewis (other settings: D 329A, 330, 569 and 643A); For TTBB and piano
378	378	(1889)	XII; No. 12	VII/2, 6	Eight Ländler, D 378	B♭ major	13/2/1816	For piano; Nos. 1–5 and 7 reuse D 374 Nos. 1–3, 7, 11 and 5; No. 2 partly in D 146 No. 10; No. 6 reuses D 370 No. 7
379	379	(1859)	XIV No. 17	I, 9 No. 13 & Anh. 2	Deutsches Salve Regina (German Salve Regina)	Sei, Mutter der Barmherzigkeit; F major	21/2/1816	Text: after Salve Regina; For SATB and organ
380	380	(1897) (1956) (1989)	XXI, 2 No. 28	VII/2, 6	Three Minuets, each with Two Trios	E major (No. 1); A major (No. 2); C major (No. 3)	22/2/1816	For piano; AGA only Nos. 1–2; Start of No. 3, a fragment (1st trio incomplete, 2nd trio missing), reused in D 557
381	381	(1895)	XX, 4 No. 189	IV, 10	Morgenlied, D 381	Die frohe, neubelebte Flur	24/2/1816	
382	382	(1895)	XX, 4 No. 190	IV, 10	Abendlied, D 382	Sanft glänzt die Abendsonne	24/2/1816	
383; 992	383	(1888)	XIV No. 13	I, 7	Stabat Mater, D 383, a.k.a. Deutsches Stabat Mater (German Stabat Mater)	Jesus Christus schwebt am Kreuze; F minor	started 28/2/1816	Text by Klopstock after Stabat Mater; For stbSATB and orchestra; Sketch for Nos. 5–6 was D 992
384	384	137p,1 (1836)	VIII; No. 2	VI, 8 No. 1 & anh. 1	Violin Sonata, D 384, a.k.a. Sonatina No. 1	D major	March 1816	Allegro molto (+early version in NSA) – Andante – Allegro vivace
385	385	137p,2 (1836)	VIII; No. 3	VI, 8 No. 2	Violin Sonata, D 385, a.k.a. Sonatina No. 2	A minor	March 1816	Allegro moderato – Andante – Minuet – Allegro
386	386	(1833)	XIV No. 20	I, 9 No. 12 & Anh. 1	Salve Regina, D 386	B♭ major Salve Regina	early 1816	Text: Salve Regina (other settings: D 27, 106, 223, 676 and 811); For SATB
387	387	(1897)	XXI, 4 No. 44	III, 2b Anh. No. 4b	Die Schlacht, D 387	Schwer und dumpfig	March 1816	Text by Schiller (other setting: D 249); Sketch for vocal soloists, choir and piano; Music partly in D 249 and 602 No. 1
388	388	(1895)	XX, 4 No. 193	IV, 10	Laura am Klavier	Wenn dein Finger durch die Saiten meistert	March 1816	Text by Schiller; Two versions
389	389	(1873)	XX, 4 No. 194	IV, 3	Des Mädchens Klage, D 389	Der Eichwald brauset	March 1816	Text by Schiller, from Wallenstein: Die Piccolomini III, 7 (other settings: D 6 and 191)
390	390	(1895)	XX, 4 No. 195	IV, 10	Entzückung an Laura, D 390	Laura, über diese Welt	March 1816	Text by Schiller (other setting: D 577)
391	391	111p,3 (1829)	XX, 4 No. 196	IV, 10	Die vier Weltalter	Wohl perlet im Glase	March 1816	Text by Schiller
392	392	(1895)	XX, 4 No. 197	IV, 10	Pflügerlied	Arbeitsam und wacker	March 1816	Text by Salis-Seewis
393	393	(1845)	XX, 4 No. 198	IV, 11	Die Einsiedelei, D 393	Es rieselt klar und wehend ein Quell	March 1816	Text by Salis-Seewis (other settings: D 337 and 563)
394	394	(1895)	XX, 4 No. 199	IV, 10	An die Harmonie a.k.a. Gesang an die Harmonie	Schöpferin beseelter Töne!	March 1816	Text by Salis-Seewis
395	395	111p,2 (1829)	XX, 4 No. 205	IV, 10	Lebensmelodien	Auf den Wassern wohnt mein stilles Leben	March 1816	Text by Schlegel, A. W.
396	396	(1975)		IV, 2 Anh. No. 1	Gruppe aus dem Tartarus, D 396	Horch, wie Murmeln des empörten Meeres	March 1816	Text by Schiller (other settings: D 65 and 583); Fragment
397	397	(1832)	XX, 4 No. 191	IV, 10	Ritter Toggenburg	Ritter, treue Schwesterliebe	13/3/1816	Text by Schiller
398	398	(1887)	XX, 4 No. 217	IV, 10	Frühlingslied, D 398	Die Luft ist blau	13/5/1816	Text by Hölty (other setting: D 243)
399	399	(1895)	XX, 4 No. 218	IV, 10	Auf den Tod einer Nachtigall, D 399	Sie ist dahin, die Maienlieder tönte	13/5/1816	Text by Hölty (other setting: D 201)
400	400	(1895)	XX, 4 No. 219	IV, 10	Die Knabenzeit	Wie glücklich, wem das Knabenkleid	13/5/1816	Text by Hölty
401	401	(1895)	XX, 4 No. 220	IV, 10	Winterlied, D 401	Keine Blumen blühn	13/5/1816	Text by Hölty
402	402	(1872)	XX, 4 No. 192	IV, 10	Der Flüchtling	Frisch atmet des Morgens lebendiger Hauch	18/3/1816	Text by Schiller (other setting: D 67)
403	403	(1845) (1895)	XX, 4 No. 201	IV, 10	Lied, D 403	In's stille Land	27/3/1816	Text by Salis-Seewis; Four versions: 1st, publ. in 1845, and 2nd in AGA; Music partly reappears in D 877 No. 4
404	404	(1885)	XX, 4 No. 200	IV, 10	Die Herbstnacht a.k.a. Die Wehmuth	Mit leisen Harfentönen	March 1816	Text by Salis-Seewis
405	405	(1895)	XX, 4 No. 202	IV, 10	Der Herbstabend	Abendglockenhalle zittern	April 1816	Text by Salis-Seewis; Two versions: 1st in AGA
406	406	(1887)	XX, 4 No. 208	IV, 10	Abschied von der Harfe	Noch einmal tön, o Harfe	March 1816	Text by Salis-Seewis
407; 441	407	(1891) (1892)	XVI; No. 44; XIX; No. 5	III, 3 No. 22; Anh. IV No. 3 VIII, 2 No. 31	Beitrag zur fünfzigjährigen Jubelfeier des Herrn von Salieri	Gütigster, Bester! Weisester Größter! – So Güt’ als Weisheit strömen mild – Unser aller Großpapa, bleibe noch recht lange da	before 16/6/1816	Text by Schubert; Quartet for ttbb (variant for ttb and piano: formerly D 441) – Aria for t and piano – Canon for three voices
408	408	137p,3 (1836)	VIII; No. 4	VI, 8 No. 3	Violin Sonata, D 408, a.k.a. Sonatina No. 3	G minor	April 1816	Allegro giusto – Andante – Minuet – Allegro moderato
409	409	(1872)	XX, 4 No. 206	IV, 10	Die verfehlte Stunde	Quälend ungestilltes Sehnen	April 1816	Text by Schlegel, A. W.
410	410	115p,3 (1829)	XX, 4 No. 207	IV, 10	Sprache der Liebe	Laß dich mit gelinden Schlägen rühren	April 1816	Text by Schlegel, A. W.
411	411	(1887)	XX, 4 No. 209	IV, 10	Daphne am Bach	Ich hab' ein Bächlein funden	April 1816	Text by Stolberg-Stolberg
412	412	(1838)	XX, 4 No. 210	IV, 10	Stimme der Liebe, D 412	Meine Selinde	April 1816	Text by Stolberg-Stolberg; Two versions: 2nd in AGA
413	413	(1895)	XX, 4 No. 211	IV, 10	Entzückung	Tag voll Himmel!	April 1816	Text by Matthisson
414	414	(1895)	XX, 4 No. 212	IV, 10	Geist der Liebe, D 414	Der Abend schleiert Flur und Hain	April 1816	Text by Matthisson (other setting: D 747)
415	415	(1895)	XX, 4 No. 213	IV, 10	Klage, D 415	Die Sonne steigt, die Sonne sinkt	April 1816	Text by Matthisson
416	416	(1825)		IV, 10	Lied in der Abwesenheit	Ach, mir ist das Herz so schwer	April 1816	Text by Stolberg-Stolberg; Fragment
417	417	(1884)	I, 2 No. 4	V, 2 No. 4	Symphony No. 4 Tragic	C minor	completed 27/4/1816	Adagio molto, Allegro vivace – Andante – Minuet – Allegro
418	418	(1895)	XX, 4 No. 214	IV, 10	Stimme der Liebe, D 418	Abendgewölke schweben hell	29/4/1816	Text by Matthisson (other setting: D 187)
419	419	(1895)	XX, 4 No. 215	IV, 10	Julius an Theone	Nimmer, nimmer darf ich dir gestehen	30/4/1816	Text by Matthisson
420	420	(1871)	XII; No. 11	VII/2, 7a	Twelve German Dances, D 420	Various keys	1816	For piano; No. 10 reappears in D 679 No. 1
421	421	(1889)	XII; No. 27	VII/2, 6	Six Écossaises, D 421	Various keys	May 1816	For piano; No. 1 after D 145 Écoss. No. 5
422	422	16,2 (1823)	XVI; No. 8	III, 3 No. 23	Naturgenuß, D 422	Im Abendschimmer wallt der Quell	1822?	Text by Matthisson (other setting: D 188); For ttbb and piano
423	423	(1974)		III, 4 No. 36	Andenken, D 423	Ich denke dein wenn durch den Hain	May 1816	Text by Matthisson (other setting: D 99); For ttb
424	424	(1974)		III, 4 No. 37	Erinnerungen, D 424	Am Seegestad, in lauen Vollmondsnächten	May 1816	Text by Matthisson (other setting: D 98); For ttb
425	425				Lebensbild		May 1816	Lost: may be related to D Anh. I/23 with the same lyrics as D 508; For ttb
426	426			III, 4	Trinklied, D 426	Herr Bacchus ist ein braver Mann	May 1816	Lost; Text by Bürger; For ttb
427	427	(1892)	XIX; No. 17	III, 4 No. 38	Trinklied im Mai	Bekränzet die Tonnen	May 1816	Text by Hölty; For ttb
428	428	(1974)		III, 4 No. 39	Widerhall	Auf ewig dein, wenn Berg und Meere trennen	May 1816	Text by Matthisson; For ttb
429	429	(1885)	XX, 4 No. 221	IV, 10	Minnelied	Holder klingt der Vogelsang	May 1816	Text by Hölty
430	430	(1895)	XX, 4 No. 222	IV, 10	Die frühe Liebe	Schon im bunten Knabenkleide	May 1816	Text by Hölty; Two versions: 1st in AGA
431	431	(1887)	XX, 4 No. 223	IV, 10	Blumenlied	Es ist ein halbes Himmelreich	May 1816	Text by Hölty
432	432	(1850) (1895)	XX, 4 No. 224	IV, 10	Der Leidende a.k.a. Klage, D 432	Nimmer trag' ich langer	May 1816	Other setting: D Anh. I/28; Two versions: 1st publ. in 1850
433	433	(1895)	XX, 4 No. 225	IV, 10	Seligkeit	Freuden sonder Zahl	May 1816	Text by Hölty
434	434	(1850)	XX, 4 No. 226	IV, 10	Erntelied	Sicheln schallen, Ähren fallen	May 1816	Text by Hölty
435	435	(1893)	XV, 7 No. 13	II, 13; III, 4 No. 30	Die Bürgschaft, D 435	(Opera in three acts)	started 2/5/1816	For four sopranos, three tenors, three basses, two baritones, SATB and orchestra; Unfinished: Nos. 1–9 (Act I) – Nos. 10–14 (Act II, No. 13 in NSA III, 4, No. 14 reuses part of D 246) – Nos. 15–16 (Act III, No. 16 is fragment)
436; 437	436	(1850)	XX, 4 No. 216	IV, 10	Klage, D 436	Dein Silber schien durch Eichengrün	12/5/1816	Text by Hölty; Two versions: 1st publ. in 1850 – 2nd was D 437
438	438	(1897)	XXI, 1 No. 4	V, 7 No. 2	Rondo, D 438	A major	June 1816	For violin and string orchestra
439	439	(1872)	XVII; No. 12	III, 2a No. 8	An die Sonne, D 439	O Sonne, Königin der Welt	June 1816	Text by Uz; For satb and piano
440	440	(1839)	XVII; No. 18	III, 2a No. 9	Chor der Engel	Christ ist erstanden	June 1816	Text by Goethe, from Faust I, 1; For SATB
441	407							See D 407
442	442	(1847)	XX, 4 No. 227	III, 3 No. 7 Anh. I No. 4 IV, 10	Das große Halleluja	Ehre sei dem Hocherhabnen	June 1816	Text by Klopstock; For voice(s?) and piano
443	443	(1895)	XX, 4 No. 228	III, 3 No. 8 Anh. I No. 5 IV, 10	Schlachtlied, D 443, a.k.a. Schlachtgesang	Mit unserm Arm ist nichts getan	June 1816	Text by Klopstock, from Oden (other setting: D 912); For voice(s?) and piano
444	444	(1831)	XX, 4 No. 229	IV, 10	Die Gestirne	Es tönet sein Lob	June 1816	Text by Klopstock, from Oden
445	445	(1837)	XX, 4 No. 230	IV, 10	Edone	Dein süßes Bild, Edone	June 1816	Text by Klopstock, from Oden
446	446	(1887)	XX, 4 No. 231	IV, 10	Die Liebesgötter	Cypris, meiner Phyllis gleich	June 1816	Text by Uz
447	447	(1895)	XX, 4 No. 232	IV, 10	An den Schlaf	Komm und senke die umflorten Schwingen	June 1816	
448	448	(1887)	XX, 4 No. 233	IV, 10	Gott im Frühlinge	In seinem schimmernden Gewand	June 1816	Text by Uz; Two versions: 1st, publ. in 1887, in AGA
449	449	(1872)	XX, 4 No. 234	IV, 10	Der gute Hirt	Was sorgest du?	June 1816	Text by Uz
450	450	(1832) (1895)	XX, 4 No. 236	IV, 10	Fragment from Aeschylus	So wird der Mann	June 1816	Text by Mayrhofer after Aeschylus' Eumenides (Oresteia III); Two versions: 2nd publ. in 1832
451	451				Prometheus, D 451	Hervor aus Buschen und Baumen	17/6/1816	Text by Draexler von Carin; Lost; Cantata for soprano, bass, choir and orchestra
452; 961	452	48 (1825) (1829)	XIII, 1 No. 4	I, 2	Mass No. 4	C major Kyrie – Gloria – Credo – Sanctus & Benedictus – Agnus Dei	Jun. 1816– Oct. 1828	Text: Mass ordinary (other settings: D 24E, 31, 45, 49, 56, 66, 105, 167, 324, 678, 755 and 950); For satbSATB and orchestra; 2nd setting of "Benedictus", publ. in 1829, was D 961
453	453			I, 5 Anh.	Requiem	C minor Introitus – Kyrie	July 1816	Fragment; For SATB and orchestra
454	454	(1872)	XX, 4 No. 239	IV, 10	Grablied auf einen Soldaten	Zieh hin, du braver Krieger du!	July 1816	Text by Schubart
455	455	(1887)	XX, 4 No. 240	IV, 10	Freude der Kinderjahre	Freude, die im frühen Lenze	July 1816	Text by Köpken
456	456	(1887)	XX, 4 No. 241	IV, 10	Das Heimweh, D 456	Oft in einsam stillen Stunden	July 1816	Text by Hell
457	457	44 (1827)	XX, 4 No. 237	IV, 3	An die untergehende Sonne	Sonne, du sinkst	July 1816– May 1817	Text by Kosegarten
458	458	(1872)	XX, 4 No. 242	IV, 10	Aus Diego Manazares: Ilmerine	Wo irrst du durch einsame Schatten	30/07/1816	Text by Schlechta from Diego Manazares
459 (Nos. 1–2)	459	(1843)	XI No. 14	VII/2, 1 No. 3	Piano Sonata, D 459	E major	August; 1816	Allegro moderato – Scherzo; With D 459A a.k.a. Fünf Klavierstücke
459 (Nos. 3–5)	459A	(1843)	XI No. 14	VII/2, 4	Three piano pieces, D 459A	C major (No. 1); A major (No. 2); E major (No. 3)	1816?	Adagio – Scherzo – Allegro patetico; With D 459 a.k.a. Fünf Klavierstücke
460	460	(1888)	XIV No. 7	I, 9 No. 6	Tantum ergo, D 460	C major	August; 1816	Text by Aquinas (other settings: D 461, 730, 739, 750, 962 and Anh. I/17); For sSATB and orchestra
461	461	(1935)		I, 9 No. 7	Tantum ergo, D 461	C major	August; 1816	Text by Aquinas (other settings: D 460, 730, 739, 750, 962 and Anh. I/17); For satbSATB and orchestra
462	462	(1895)	XX, 4 No. 244	IV, 10	An Chloen, D 462	Bei der Liebe reinsten Flammen	August; 1816	Text by Jacobi
463	463	(1895)	XX, 4 No. 245	IV, 10	Hochzeit-Lied	Will singen euch im alten Ton	August; 1816	Text by Jacobi
464	464	(1895)	XX, 4 No. 246	IV, 10	In der Mitternacht	Todesstille deckt das Tal	August; 1816	Text by Jacobi
465	465	(1885)	XX, 4 No. 247	IV, 10	Trauer der Liebe	Wo die Taub' in stillen Buchen	August; 1816	Text by Jacobi; Two versions: 1st, in AGA, publ. 1885
466	466	(1872)	XX, 4 No. 248	IV, 10	Die Perle	Es ging ein Mann zur Frühlingszeit	August; 1816	Text by Jacobi
467	467	(1885)	XX, 10; No. 593	IV, 10	Pflicht und Liebe	Du, der ewig um mich trauert	August; 1816	Text by Gotter; Fragment
468	468	(1895)	XX, 4 No. 243	IV, 10	An den Mond, D 468	Was schauest du so hell	07/08/1816	Text by Hölty
469	469	(1897)	XXII, 11 Nos. 394– 395	IV, 3	Mignon, D 469	So laßt mich scheinen, bis ich werde	September; 1816	Text by Goethe, from Wilhelm Meister's Apprenticeship (other settings: D 727 and 877 No. 3); Two versions, both fragments
470; 601	470	(1886)	II No. 3	V, 5 VI, 4 Anh. No. 4	Overture, D 470	B♭ major	September; 1816	For orchestra; Overture to D 472(?); Fragment for string quartet was D 601
471	471	(1890) (1897)	VI No. 1 XXII, 1 p. 84	VI, 6 No. 1 & Anh. No. 2	String Trio, D 471	B♭ major	September; 1816	Allegro (AGA VI) – Andante sostenuto (fragment, in AGA XXII)
472	472	128p (1830) (1892)	XVII; No. 2	III, 1	Kantate zu Ehren von Josef Spendou	Da liegt er, starr – Gottes Bild ist Furst und Staat – Ein Punkt nur ist der Mensch – Die Sonne sticht	September; 1816	Text by Hoheisel; For sstbSSATB and orchestra (piano reduction in 1st ed.); Overture: D 470(?); Recitative, aria with choir – Recitative, duet – Recitative, choir – Recitative, quartet with choir
473	473	(1833) (1895)	XX, 4 No. 249	IV, 10	Liedesend	Auf seinem gold'nen Throne	September; 1816	Text by Mayrhofer; Two versions: 2nd in 1st ed.
474	474	(1832) (1895)	XX, 4 No. 250	IV, 10	Lied des Orpheus, als er in die Hölle ging	Wälze dich hinweg	September; 1816	Text by Jacobi; Two versions: 2nd in 1st ed.
475	475	(1885)	XX, 4 No. 251	IV, 11	Abschied: Nach einer Wallfahrts-Arie bearbeitet	Über die Berge zieht ihr fort	September; 1816	Text by Jacobi
476	476	(1872)	XX, 4 No. 252	IV, 11	Rückweg	Zum Donaustrom, zur Kaiserstadt	September; 1816	Text by Mayrhofer
477	477	(1895)	XX, 4 No. 253	IV, 11	Alte Liebe rostet nie	Alte Liebe rostet nie	September; 1816	Text by Mayrhofer
478; 479; 480	478	12 (1822) (1895)	XX, 4 Nos. 254, 256– 258, 255	IV, 1a & b No. 10 & Anh. Nos. 6–7	Gesänge des Harfners aus "Wilhelm Meister"	1. Wer sich der Einsamkeit ergibt – 2. Wer nie sein Brot mit Tränen aß – 3. An die Türen will ich schleichen	September; 1816–1822	Text by Goethe, from Wilhelm Meister's Apprenticeship (other setting of No. 1: D 325); No. 2 was D 480; No. 3 was D 479; Two versions: 1st, Harfenspieler I/III/II, composed 1816, publ. 1895, has two variants of No. 2 – 2nd, 1822, is Op. 12
481	481	(1895)	XX, 4 No. 259	IV, 3	Sehnsucht, D 481	Nur wer die Sehnsucht kennt	September; 1816	Text by Goethe, from Wilhelm Meister's Apprenticeship (other settings: D 310, 359, 656 and 877 Nos. 1 & 4)
482	482	(1895)	XX, 4 No. 264	IV, 11	Der Sänger am Felsen	Klage, meine Flöte, klage	September; 1816	Text by Pichler, from Idyllen
483	483	(1895)	XX, 4 No. 265	IV, 11	Lied, D 483	Ferne von der großen Stadt	September; 1816	Text by Pichler, from Idyllen
484	484	(1895)	XX, 10; No. 594	IV, 11	Gesang der Geister über den Wassern, D 484	Des Menschen Seele gleicht dem Wasser	September; 1816	Text by Goethe (other settings: D 538, 705 and 714); Fragment
485	485	(1885)	I, 2 No. 5	V, 2 No. 5	Symphony No. 5	B♭ major	Sept.–3 Oct. 1816	Allegro – Andante con moto – Minuet – Allegro vivace
486	486	(1888)	XIV No. 11	I, 9 No. 4	Magnificat	Magnificat anima mea Dominum; C major	15/09/1815	Text by Luke (Vulgate translation); For satbSATB and orchestra
487	487	(1865)	VII, 1 No. 2	V, 7 No. 4 VI, 7 No. 5	Adagio e Rondo concertante	F major	October 1816	For piano quartet
488	488	(1888)	XIV No. 10	I, 8	Auguste jam coelestium	Auguste jam coelestium	October 1816	Duet for st and orchestra
489; 493	489	4,1 (1821) (1895) (1970)	XX, 4 No. 266	IV, 1a & b No. 5	Der Wanderer, D 489, a.k.a. Der Unglückliche	Ich komme vom Gebirge her	October 1816	Text by Schmidt von Lübeck; Three versions: 1st and 3rd in AGA 1895 – 2nd and 3rd were D 493 (2nd publ. 1970 – 3rd is Op. 4 No. 1); Music partly reappears in D 760
490	490	(1895)	XX, 4 No. 267	IV, 11	Der Hirt	Du Turm! zu meinem Leide	October 1816	Text by Mayrhofer
491	491	(1887)	XX, 4 No. 269	IV, 11	Geheimnis: An F. Schubert	Sag an, wer lehrt dich Lieder	October 1816	Text by Mayrhofer
492	492	(1849)	XX, 4 No. 270	III, 3 No. 15; IV, 11	Zum Punsche, D 492	Woget brausend, Harmonien	October 1816	Text by Mayrhofer
493	489							See D 489
494	494	(1871)	XVI; No. 32	III, 4 No. 41	Der Geistertanz, D 494	Die bretterne Kammer der Toten erbebt	November 1816	Text by Matthisson (other settings: D 15, 15A and 116); For ttbbb
495	495	(1868)	XX, 4 No. 271	IV, 11	Abendlied der Fürstin	Der Abend rötet nun das Tal	November 1816	Text by Mayrhofer
496	496	(1885)	XX, 4 No. 274	IV, 11	Bei dem Grabe meines Vaters	Friede sei um diesen Grabstein her!	November 1816	Text by Claudius
140	496A	(1968)		IV, 7 No. 22	Klage um Ali Bey, D 496A	Laßt mich! laßt mich! ich will klagen	November 1816	Text by Claudius (other setting: D 140)
497	497	98,1 (1829)	XX, 4 No. 276	IV, 5	An die Nachtigall, D 497	Er liegt und schläft	November 1816	Text by Claudius
498	498	98,2 (1829)	XX, 4 No. 277	IV, 5	Wiegenlied, D 498	Schlafe, schlafe, holder süßer Knabe	November 1816	
499	499	(1885)	XX, 4 No. 278	IV, 11	Abendlied, D 499	Der Mond ist aufgegangen	November 1816	Text by Claudius
500	500	(1895)	XX, 4 No. 279	IV, 11	Phidile	Ich war erst sechzehn Sommer alt	November 1816	Text by Claudius
501	501	(1895)	XX, 4 No. 281	IV, 11	Zufriedenheit, D 501	Ich bin vergnugt	November 1816	Text by Claudius (other setting: D 362); Two versions: 1st in AGA
502	502	(1872)	XX, 4 No. 282	IV, 11	Herbstlied, D 502	Bunt sind schon die Wälder	November 1816	Text by Salis-Seewis
503	503			IV, 11	Mailied, D 503	Grüner wird die Au	November 1816	Text by Hölty (other settings: D 129 and 199)
504	504	6,3 (1821) (1970)	XX, 4 No. 275	IV, 1a & b No. 8	Am Grabe Anselmos	Daß ich dich verloren habe	4/11/1816	Text by Claudius; Two versions: 1st, in AGA, is Op. 6 No. 3
505	505	145p,1 (1848) (1897)	XI No. 5 XXII, 4 No. 5	VII/2, 2	Adagio, D 505	D♭ major	September; 1818?	For piano; 2nd movement of D 625?; Abridged variant in E major, in AGA XXI, is Op. posth. 145 No. 1
506	506	145p,2 (1848)	XI No. 5	VII/2, 4	Rondo, D 506	E major	June 1817?	For piano; 4th movement of D 566?
507	507	(1895)	XX, 4 No. 283	IV, 11	Skolie, D 507	Mädchen entsiegelten	December 1816	Text by Matthisson
508	508	(1845)	XX, 4 No. 284	IV, 11	Lebenslied, D 508	Kommen und Scheiden	December 1816	Text by Matthisson (other settings: D Anh. I, 23, and possibly 425)
509	509	(1872)	XX, 4 No. 285	IV, 11	Leiden der Trennung	Vom Meere trennt sich die Welle	December 1816	Text by Metastasio, from Artaserse III, 1, "L'onda dal mar divisa", transl. by Collin, H. J.; Two versions: 1st is a fragment – 2nd in AGA
510	510	(1895)	XX, 10; No. 573	IV, 11	Vedi quanto adoro	Vedi quanto adoro	December 1816	Text by Metastasio, from Didone abbandonata II, 4; Aria for soprano and piano; Clean copy and three sketches; Last extant autograph with corrections by Salieri

== Sources ==
Multi-volume editions, websites and catalogues

- Alte Gesamt-Ausgabe (AGA) = Franz Schubert's Works: Schubert, Franz (1884–1897). Johannes Brahms; Ignaz Brüll; Anton Door; Julius Epstein; Johann Nepomuk Fuchs; Josef Gänsbacher; Joseph Hellmesberger Sr.; Eusebius Mandyczewski (eds.). Franz Schubert's Werke: Kritisch durchgesehene Gesammtausgabe (in German). Leipzig: Breitkopf & Härtel. Reprints of several volumes by Kalmus and Dover Publications; Franz Schubert's Werke (Series I–XIX and XXI), Series XX, Revisionsbericht: Scores at the International Music Score Library Project
- Deutsch catalogue (D) = Schubert Thematic Catalogue:
  - Deutsch, Otto Erich; et al. (Donald R. Wakeling) (1951). Schubert: Thematic Catalogue of all his Works in Chronological Order (1st ed.). London: Dent. 1995 reprint, with errata correction: Deutsch, Otto Erich; et al. (Donald R. Wakeling) (1995). The Schubert Thematic Catalogue (Dover ed.). Mineola, N.Y.: Dover Publications. ISBN 0486286851.
  - Deutsch, Otto Erich (1978). Walther Dürr; Arnold Feil; Christa Landon [in German]; Werner Aderhold (eds.). Franz Schubert: Thematisches Verzeichnis seiner Werke in chronologischer Folge. New Schubert Edition (in German). Kassel: Bärenreiter. ISBN 9783761805718. ISMN 9790006305148.
    - Series VIII (Supplement)
    - Volume 4
- Hoboken catalogue (Hob.): "Joseph Haydn (1732–1809): Werke sortiert nach Hob (Hoboken-Verzeichnis, 1957-78)" (in German). Kaiserslautern: Klassika.
- Köchel catalogue (K.): "Wolfgang Amadeus Mozart (1756–1791): Werke sortiert nach KV^{6} (Köchel-Verzeichnis, 6. Auflage, 1964)" (in German). Kaiserslautern: Klassika.
- Neue Schubert-Ausgabe (NSA) = New Schubert Edition:
  - NSA scores: Schubert, Franz (1968–2019). International Schubert Association (Tübingen) (ed.). Franz Schubert (1797–1828): New Edition of the Complete Works (in German). Kassel: Bärenreiter. [over 80 volumes in eight series] Individual volumes:
    - NSA II, 15: Schubert, Franz; Neumann, Johann Philipp (2008). Jahrmärker, Manuela; Aigner, Thomas (eds.). Sacontala. New Schubert Edition (in German). Kassel: Bärenreiter. ISMN 9790006497294.
      - Series II (Stage Works), Vol. 15
    - NSA VIII, 4: See above Deutsch (1978)
  - NSA website: "New Schubert Edition". Tübingen: International Schubert Association.
- Schubert Online: "www.schubert-online.at: Schubert music manuscripts, first and early editions online". Vienna: Austrian Academy of Sciences (ÖAW).
- The LiederNet Archive: Ezust, Emily; et al. (LiederNet contributors). "Composer: Franz Peter Schubert (1797 - 1828)". Ontario: LiederNet Corporation.

Other

- Badura-Skoda, Eva; Branscombe, Peter, eds. (2008). Schubert Studies: Problems of Style and Chronology. Cambridge University Press. ISBN 0521088720.
  - Walther Dürr "Schubert's Songs and Their Poetry" pp. 1–24
  - Rufus Hallmark "Schubert's 'Auf dem Strom'" pp. 25–46
  - Elaine Brody "Schubert and Sulzer Revisited" pp. 47–60
  - Marius Flothuis "Schubert Revises Schubert" pp. 61–84
  - Elizabeth Norman McKay "Schubert as Composer of Operas" pp. 85–104
  - Peter Branscombe "Schubert and the Melodrama" pp. 105–142
  - Christoph Wolff "Schubert's 'Der Tod und dad Mädchen'" pp. 143–172
  - Peter Gülke on String Quintet D 956 pp. 173–186
  - Paul Badura-Skoda on Schubert's 'Great' C major Symphony pp. 187–208
  - Robert Winter "Paper Studies and the Future of Schubert Research" pp. 209–276
  - Eva Badura-Skoda "The Chronology of Schubert's Piano Trios" pp. 277–296
  - Reinhard Van Hoorickx "The Chronology of Schubert's Fragments and Sketches" pp. 297–326
  - Arnold Feil "Rhythm in Schubert" pp. 327–346
  - Alexander Weinmann on Leopold Puschl and Schubert's sojourn in Zseliz pp. 347–356
- Elsholz, Gunter (1982). Vogel, Reimut (ed.). Franz Schubert: Sinfonie in E-Dur 1825. Stuttgart: Goldoni. ISBN 3922044050. OCLC 987719669.
- Hilmar, Ernst; Jestremski, Margret, eds. (2004). Schubert-Enzyklopädie (in German). Vol. 1. Introduction by Alfred Brendel. Tutzing: Hans Schneider. ISBN 3795211557.
- Keefe, Simon P., ed. (2006). Mozart Studies. Cambridge University Press. ISBN 0521851025.
- Kube, Michael (2009). "Franz Schuberts Deutsche Trauermesse (D 621) als Problem der Text- und Stilkritik". In Mitterauer, Gertraud; Müller, Ulrich; Springeth, Margarete; Vitzthum, Verena (eds.). Was ist Textkritik?: Zur Geschichte und Relevanz eines Zentralbegriffs der Editionswissenschaft (in German). Walter de Gruyter. pp. 129–140. ISBN 3484970782.
- Mozart, Wolfgang Amadeus; Haydn, Joseph; Haydn, Michael (2008). Kircher, Armin (ed.). Chorbuch Mozart • Haydn VII: Kanonsammlung [Choral Collection Mozart • Haydn, Vol. VII: Canon Collection] (in German, Latin, English, and Italian). Stuttgart: Carus-Verlag. OCLC 274222567.
- Newbould, Brian (1999). Schubert: The Music and the Man. University of California Press. ISBN 0520219570.
- Reed, John (1997). The Schubert Song Companion. Manchester University Press. ISBN 1901341003.
- Van Hoorickx, Reinhard (1971). "Franz Schubert (1797–1828) List of the Dances in Chronological Order". Revue belge de Musicologie / Belgisch Tijdschrift voor Muziekwetenschap. 25 (1). Belgian Musicological Society: 68–97. doi:10.2307/3686180. ISSN 0771-6788. JSTOR 3686180.
- Van Hoorickx, Reinhard (1974–1976). "Thematic Catalogue of Schubert's Works: New Additions, Corrections and Notes". Revue belge de Musicologie / Belgisch Tijdschrift voor Muziekwetenschap. 28–30. Belgian Musicological Society: 136–171. doi:10.2307/3686053. ISSN 0771-6788. JSTOR 3686053.
