= 1816 in music =

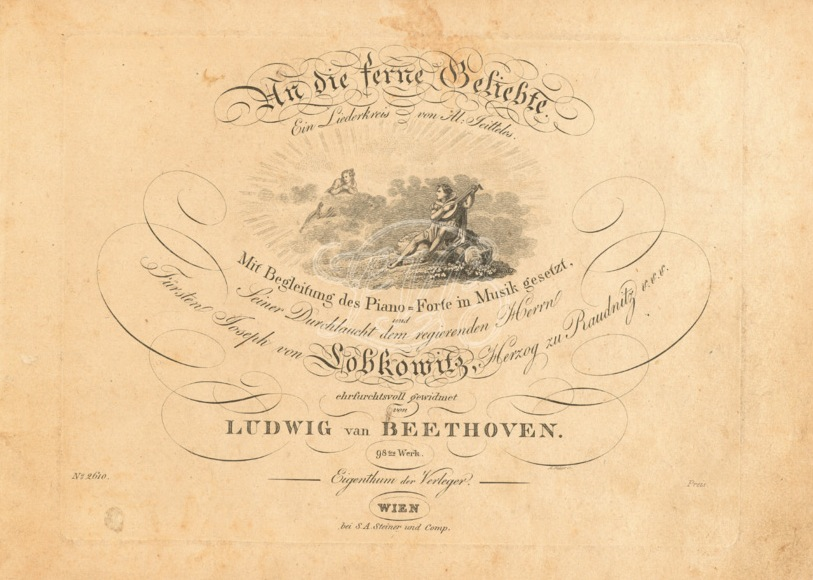
Title page of the first edition (1816), Bonn, Beethoven-Haus

This is a list of music-related events in 1816.

== Events ==
- January 9 – Ludwig van Beethoven obtains custody of his nephew Karl, after a legal battle with the boy's mother.
- January 12 – The première of Gioacchino Rossini's new cantata, Giunone, takes place at the Teatro di San Carlo, Naples, where the composer is musical director.
- February 12 – The Teatro di San Carlo in Naples burns down; reconstruction starts almost immediately, at the behest of King Ferdinand IV.
- February 20 – Rossini's opera, Almaviva, ossia L’inutile precauzione (later better known as The Barber of Seville), receives its première at the Teatro Argentina, Rome.
- March 21 – Prominent Jewish couple Abraham and Lea Mendelssohn arrange for their four children, Fanny, Felix, Rebecka and Paul, to be secretly baptized as Lutherans in the Jerusalemkirche, Berlin.
- April 9 – Returning to Prague after a twenty-year absence, Johann Nepomuk Hummel gives a public recital.
- April 17 – Josef von Spaun writes to Johann Wolfgang von Goethe for permission to have his poems set to music by the youthful Franz Schubert.
- April 29 – Luigi Cherubini's cantata Inno alla primavera, commissioned by the Royal Philharmonic Society, is given its première in London, a year later than scheduled and without the composer present.
- June 16 – In recognition of the 50th anniversary of his arrival in Vienna, Antonio Salieri is presented with a gold medal by the Lord Chamberlain on behalf of the Emperor Francis II.
- July 13 – Carl Maria von Weber meets Count Vitzthum von Eckstädt at Carlsbad; the encounter leads to Weber being appointed Kapellmeister at Dresden.
- October 2 – Johann Nepomuk Hummel is offered a post at Stuttgart by Duke Frederick I of Württemberg.
- October 18 – Louis Spohr and Niccolò Paganini meet in Venice.
- November 19 – Carl Maria von Weber becomes engaged to soprano Caroline Brandt.
- November 25 – Muzio Clementi leaves London after a six-month stay.

== Popular music ==
- "The Clown's Bazaar" a.k.a. "Grimaldi's Bazaar" sung by Joseph Grimaldi in Gnomes and Fairies or Harlequin Hurry Skurry

== Classical music ==
- Ludwig van Beethoven
  - An die ferne Geliebte, Op. 98
  - Der Mann von Wort, Op. 99
  - Piano Sonata No. 28
  - Sehnsucht, WoO 146
- Luigi Cherubini – Requiem in C minor
- Johann Nepomuk Hummel – Septet No.1, Op. 74
- Conradin Kreutzer – String Quintet, Op. 62
- Franz Krommer – 3 String Quartets, Op. 92
- Joseph Mayseder – Polonaise No.3, Op. 12
- Giacomo Meyerbeer – Gli amori di Teolinda (cantata)
- Ignaz Moscheles – Grande sonate, Op. 41
- George Onslow – 3 String Quartets, Op. 9
- Franz Schubert
  - Litanei auf das Fest Aller Seelen, D. 343
  - Stabat Mater in F minor
  - Overture in B-flat major, D.470
  - String Trio in B-flat major, D 471
  - Lieder: Stimme der Liebe, D.412; 3 Gesänge des Harfners, Op. 12, D.478; Der Wanderer, D.489; Loda's Gespenst, D.150; Die Erwartung, D.159
- Jan Václav Voříšek – 6 Impromptus, Op. 7
- Carl Maria von Weber – Divertimento assai facile, Op. 38

== Opera ==
- François Adrien Boieldieu
  - La fête du village voisin
  - Charles de France (with Ferdinand Hérold)
- Michele Carafa – Gabriella di Vergy
- Gaetano Donizetti – Il Pigmalione
- Étienne Méhul – La journée aux aventures
- Gioachino Rossini
  - Il Barbiere di Siviglia
  - Otello
- Franz Schubert – Die Bürgschaft, D.435 (unfinished)
- Carlo Soliva – La Testa di Bronzo
- Louis Spohr – Faust

== Births ==
- February 26 – Franz Krenn, composer and music teacher (d. 1897)
- March 19 – Johannes Verhulst, conductor and composer (d. 1891)
- April 13 – William Sterndale Bennett, pianist and composer (d. 1875)
- April 26 – Eugène Albert, woodwind instrument maker (d. 1890)
- July 16 – Antoine François Marmontel, French pianist (died 1898)
- August 17 – Benjamin Bilse, conductor and composer (d. 1902)
- September 4 – François Bazin, opera composer (d. 1878)
- November 17 – August Wilhelm Ambros, composer and music historian (d. 1876)
- November 24 – Matteo Salvi, composer (d. 1887)
- December 8 – Edvard Helsted, composer (d. 1900)
- date unknown – Edward Edwards, musician and composer (d. 1897)

== Deaths ==
- February 10 – Jean Paul Egide Martini, composer (born 1741)
- February 19 – Margareta Alströmer, singer and artist (born 1763)
- March 16 – Giuseppe Jannaconi, composer (born 1740)
- March 23 – Ignaz Vitzthumb, conductor and composer (born 1724)
- May 4 – Marie-Madeleine Guimard, ballerina (born 1743)
- May 25 – Samuel Webbe, composer (born 1740)
- June 5 – Giovanni Paisiello, composer (born 1740)
- July 31 – Josef Fiala, musician and composer (born 1748)
- December 15 – Prince Joseph Franz Maximilian Lobkowitz, patron of Beethoven (born 1772)
- date unknown – João José Baldi, pianist and composer (born 1770)
