= Nur wer die Sehnsucht kennt (disambiguation) =

Nur wer die Sehnsucht kennt is a poem by Goethe.

Nur wer die Sehnsucht kennt may also refer to:

- Nur wer die Sehnsucht kennt (Schubert) Schubert's settings of Goethe's poem
- None but the Lonely Heart (Tchaikovsky), a setting by Tchaikovsky of a Russian translation of the poem
- Nur wer die Sehnsucht kennt (Die Flippers), an album by Die Flippers
