= Lullaby (disambiguation) =

A lullaby or lullabye is a soothing song, sung most often to children before sleep.

Lullaby, lullabye or The Lullaby may also refer to:

== Film and television ==
=== Film ===
- The Lullaby (1924 film), an American silent film directed by Chester Bennett
- Lullaby (1937 film), a Soviet documentary directed by Dziga Vertov
- The Lullaby (1958 film), a South Korean film starring Jeon Ok
- Lullaby (2005 film), an Israeli documentary by Adi Arbel
- Lullaby (2008 film), a South African drama directed by Darrell Roodt
- Lullaby (2010 film), a Polish comedy film directed by Juliusz Machulski
- Lullaby (2014 film), an American drama directed by Andrew Levitas
- The Lullaby (2017 film), a South African by Darrell Roodt
- Lullaby (2022 film), a Spanish drama directed by Alauda Ruiz de Azúa
- Lullaby (2022 horror film), a Canadian-American film directed by John R. Leonetti

=== Television episodes ===
- "Lullaby", January 18, 1960, episode of American series The Play of the Week#Season 1 (1959–60)
- "Lullaby" (Angel), November 19, 2001 episode of American series Angel

== Literature ==
- "Lullaby", 1980 French short story in Mondo and Other Stories#Contents and themes by J. M. G. Le Clézio
- Lullaby (Palahniuk novel), 2002 American horror-satire
- Lullaby (Atkins novel), 2012 continuation of American detective Spenser novels
- Lullaby (Slimani novel), 2016 French psychological thriller

== Music ==
=== Classical compositions ===
- Wiegenlied, Op. 49, No. 4 "Brahms's Lullaby" by Johannes Brahms

=== Musical theatre ===
- Lullabye (musical), 1983–84

=== Albums ===
- Lullabies (EP), a 1982 EP by Cocteau Twins
- Lullaby (Book of Love album), 1988
- Lullaby (Celtic Woman album), 2011
- Lullaby (James Walsh album), 2012
- Lullaby (Jewel album), 2009
- Lullaby (Kate Ceberano and Nigel MacLean album), 2015
- Lullaby (Sophie Barker album), 2005
- Lullaby, by If Thousands, 2002

=== Songs ===
- "No Lullaby", by Jethro Tull from Heavy Horses, 1978
- "Lullaby" (Book of Love song), 1988
- "Lullaby" (The Cure song), 1989
- "Lullaby" (JayDon and Paradise song), 2025
- "Lullaby" (Professor Green song), 2014
- "Lullaby" (Mel B song), 2001
- "Lullaby" (Nickelback song), 2011
- "Lullaby" (Shawn Mullins song), 1998
- "Lullaby" (Sigala and Paloma Faith song), 2018
- "Lullaby" (Starsailor song), 2001
- "Lullaby" (The Tea Party song), 2001
- "Lullaby", by Alice Cooper from The Last Temptation
- "Lullaby", by Blackfield from Blackfield
- "Lullaby", by Brotherhood of Man from Images
- "Lullaby", by the Cat Empire from Two Shoes
- "Lullaby", by Creed from Weathered
- "Lullaby", by Cubic U (Hikaru Utada) from Precious
- "Lullaby", by Dixie Chicks from Taking the Long Way
- "Lullaby", by Got7 from Present: You
- "Lullaby", by Hayden from Skyscraper National Park
- "Lullaby", by James from Laid
- "Lullaby", by Lagwagon from Blaze
- "Lullaby", by Leonard Cohen from Old Ideas
- "Lullaby", by Lit from Lit
- "Lullaby", by Loreena McKennitt from Elemental
- "Lullaby", by Low from I Could Live in Hope
- "Lullaby", by Lukas Graham from 3 (The Purple Album)
- "Lullaby", by Matt Costa from The Elasmosaurus EP
- "Lullaby", by Newton Faulkner from Hand Built by Robots
- "Lullaby", by OK Go from Hungry Ghosts
- "Lullaby", by Olivia Newton-John from If Not for You
- "Lullaby", by OneRepublic from Waking Up
- "Lullaby", by A Perfect Circle from Thirteenth Step
- "Lullaby", by Reef from Glow
- "Lullaby", by Sia from Some People Have Real Problems
- "Lullaby", by Stephen Lynch from A Little Bit Special
- "Lullaby", by Thrice from Vheissu
- "Lullaby", by Ween from La Cucaracha
- "Lullaby", by Zebra from No Tellin' Lies
- "Lullaby", from the 1981 musical film Shock Treatment
- "Lullaby", from the 2025 charity event Together for Palestine
- "Lullabye (Goodnight, My Angel)", by Billy Joel
- "Lullabye", by Ben Folds Five from The Unauthorized Biography of Reinhold Messner
- "Lullabye", by Fall Out Boy, a hidden track from Folie à Deux
- "Lullabye", by Kevin Ayers from Whatevershebringswesing
- "Lullaby", by Todrick Hall featuring Brandy from Forbidden
- "Lullaby", debut music video (2015) from Niykee Heaton

== See also ==
- Wiegenlied (disambiguation), German word for 'lullaby'
