= Wiegenlied =

Wiegenlied (German for "lullaby") may refer to:

- Wiegenlied (Brahms), the composer's Op. 49, No. 4
- "Wiegenlied, D 498" (Schubert), "Schlafe, schlafe, holder, süßer Knabe" and two other songs by Franz Schubert
- "Wiegenlied" (Des Knaben Wunderhorn), German folk song

== See also ==
- Lullaby (disambiguation)
