= Der König in Thule =

1774 poem by Johann Wolfgang von Goethe

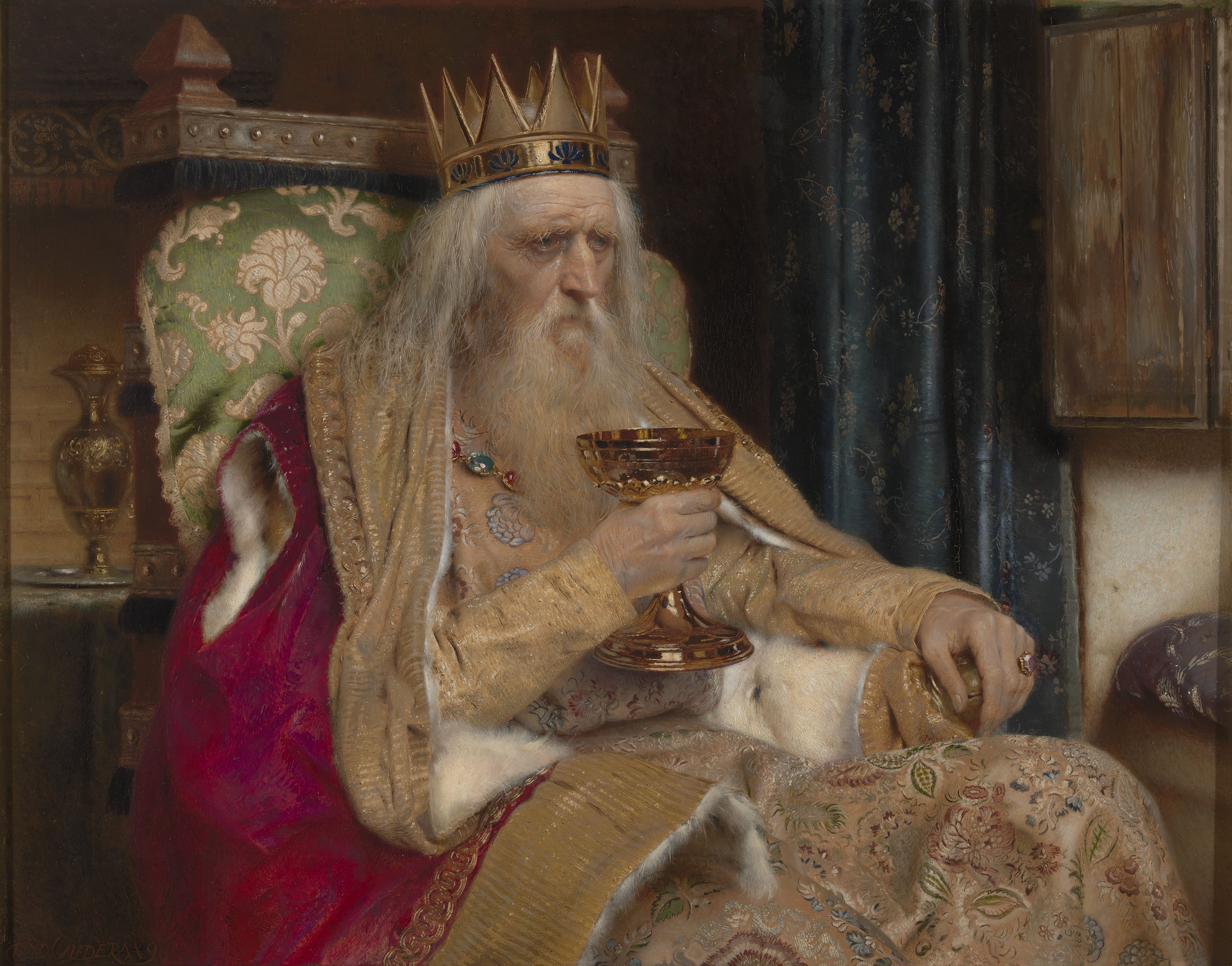
The King of Thule (1896) by Pierre Jean van der Ouderaa

"Der König in Thule" ("The King in Thule") is a German poem by Johann Wolfgang von Goethe, written in 1774.

Goethe wrote the poem "Geistesgruß" as a precursor of "Der König in Thule", while he was travelling to Lahneck Castle on the river Lahn in July 1774. Under Herder's influence, the setting was changed to the mythical island kingdom Thule, which was thought to be the northernmost place Greek seafarers ventured in antiquity.

Goethe used it later in his tragedy Faust (part I, lines 2759–82) as Gretchen's (Margaret's) introduction. It has been set to music by a number of composers, notably Franz Schubert and Franz Liszt.

Adam Oehlenschläger's Danish translation "Kongen i Leire" was published in 1802.

== Text ==
Es war ein König in Thule,
Gar treu bis an das Grab,
Dem sterbend seine Buhle
einen goldnen Becher gab.

Es ging ihm nichts darüber,
Er leert' ihn jeden Schmaus;
Die Augen gingen ihm über,
So oft er trank daraus.

Und als er kam zu sterben,
Zählt' er seine Städt' im Reich,
Gönnt' alles seinen Erben,
Den Becher nicht zugleich.

Er saß beim Königsmahle,
Die Ritter um ihn her,
Auf hohem Vätersaale,
Dort auf dem Schloß am Meer.

Dort stand der alte Zecher,
Trank letzte Lebensglut,
Und warf den heiligen Becher
Hinunter in die Flut.

Er sah ihn stürzen, trinken
Und sinken tief ins Meer,
die Augen täten ihm sinken,
Trank nie einen Tropfen mehr.

There was a king in Thule,
Was faithful till the grave,
To whom his mistress, dying,
A golden goblet gave.

Nought was to him more precious;
He drained it at every bout;
His eyes with tears ran over,
As oft as he drank thereout.

When came his time of dying,
The towns in his land he told,
Nought else to his heir denying
Except the goblet of gold.

He sat at the royal banquet
With his knights of high degree,
In the lofty hall of his fathers
In the castle by the sea.

There stood the old carouser,
And drank the last life-glow;
And hurled the hallowed goblet
Into the tide below.

He saw it plunging and filling,
And sinking deep in the sea:
Then fell his eyelids for ever,
And never more drank he!

== Reception ==
The poem attained wide popularity, and was set to music by the following composers:

- Karl Siegmund von Seckendorff (1782)
- Johann Friedrich Reichardt (1809)
- Carl Friedrich Zelter (1812, facsimile)
- Franz Schubert (1816), "Der König in Thule", D 367, Op. 5, Nr. 5
- Friedrich Silcher (1823)
- Hector Berlioz, Marguerite's aria in the opera La damnation de Faust ("Autrefois un roi de Thulé")
- Heinrich Marschner
- Franz Liszt S. 278 (1842–1856), and in Buch der Lieder, S. 531, no. 4 (1843). Tchaikovsky orchestrated the accompaniment of this version.
- Robert Schumann, op. 67, no. 1 (1849)
- Charles Gounod, Marguerite's aria in the 1859 opera Faust ("Il était un roi de Thulé")
- Anastazy Wilhelm Dreszer
- Jules Massenet, unperformed 1866 opera La coupe du roi de Thulé
- Hans von Bülow; for voice and piano (1869)
- Alphons Diepenbrock (1886)
- Hans Sommer (1920 or 1921)
