= Magnificat (Schubert) =

- Sacred choral music by Franz Schubert
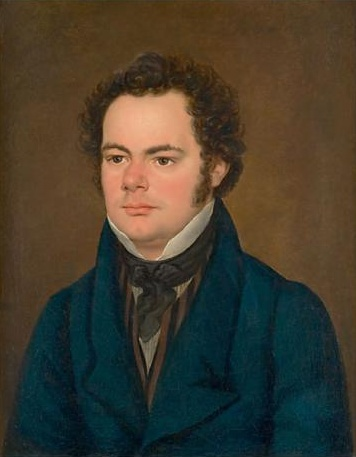
- Portrait of the composer by Franz Eybl, 1827
- Key: C major
- Catalogue: D 486
- Text: Magnificat
- Language: Latin
- Composed: 1816
- Movements: three
- Scoring: soloists; choir; orchestra

The Magnificat in C major, D 486, is a musical setting of the Magnificat hymn composed by Franz Schubert in 1816. It is scored for SATB soloists, mixed choir, 2 oboes, 2 bassoons, 2 trumpets, violin I and II, viola, timpani and basso continuo (cello, double bass and organ).

The autograph score is dated 25 September 1816, and was likely to have been composed for vespers at the Lichtental Church. This composition is Schubert's only setting of the Magnificat.

The work is divided into three distinct movements, forming a musical triptych. This is a typical format found in Schubert's sacred music.

1. "Magnificat anima mea Dominum" Allegro maestoso, C major, common time
2. "Deposuit potentes de sede" Andante, F major, 3/4
3. "Gloria Patri" Allegro vivace, C major, 3/4

Performances require approximately 10 minutes. Schubert used a shortened version of the hymn, omitting the lines quia fecit mihi magna to dispersit superbos mente cordis sui. He also changed the line ecce enim ex hoc beatam me dicent omnes generationes ("For behold, from henceforth all generations shall call me blessed") to ecce enim ex hoc me beatam dicent gentes ("For behold, from henceforth all nations shall call me blessed").
