= Rondo in A major for Violin and Strings, D 438 (Schubert) =

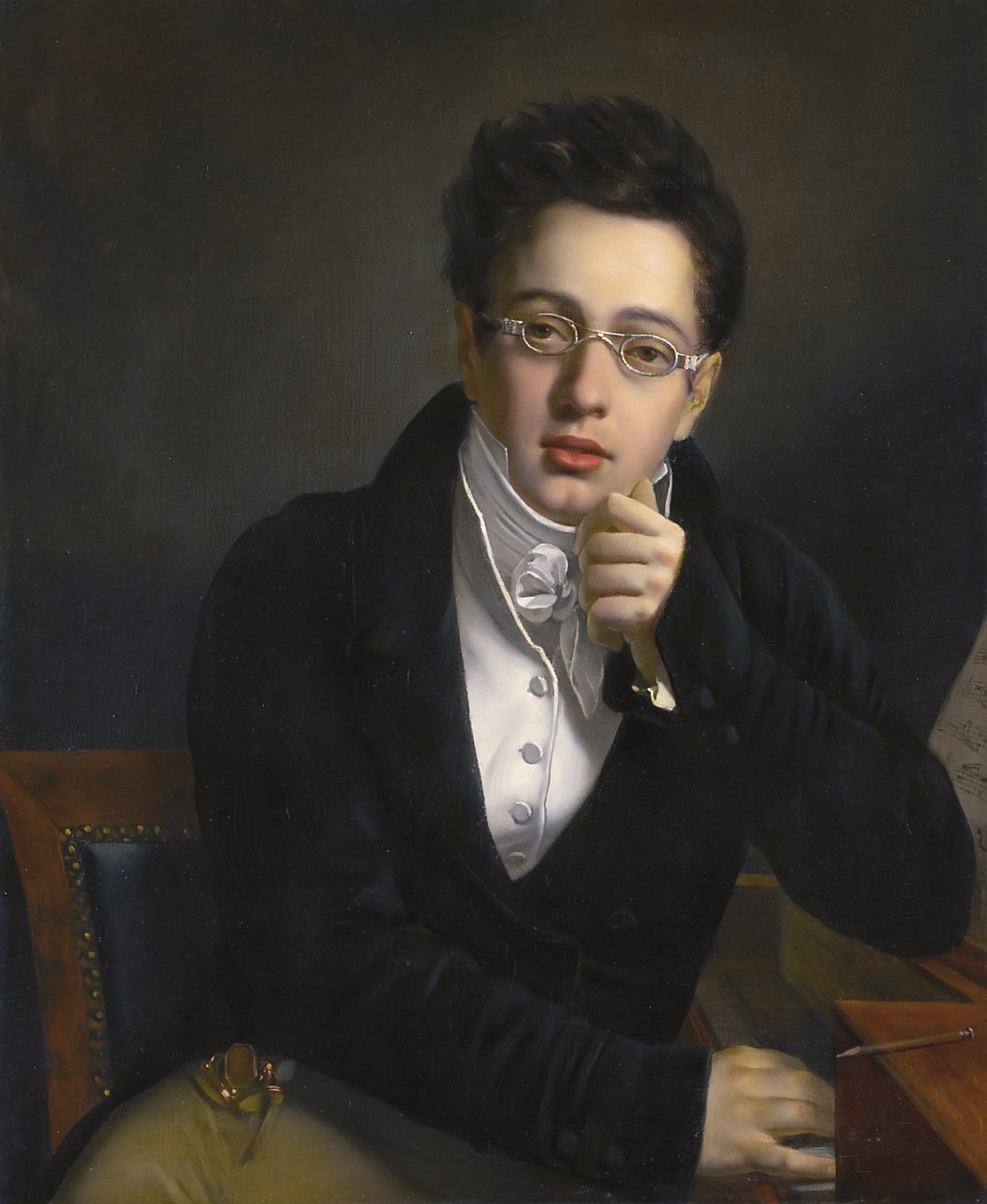
Possible portrait of the young Franz Schubert c. 1814, attributed to Josef Abel

The Rondo for Violin and Strings, D 438, is a composition in A major by Franz Schubert. He wrote the rondo in 1816. Like the roughly contemporary Adagio and Rondo concertante in F major, D 487, the work is a concertante piece designed to highlight the skills of the violin soloist.

== Background ==
Schubert composed the piece in 1816, along with a number of other works featuring a violin soloist including the three sonatinas (D 384/385 & D 408) and the Konzertstück in D major, D 345. It is believed that the work was composed with the intent that either the composer himself or his brother Ferdinand would take the soloist's part.

The piece was unpublished during the composer's lifetime, not seeing publication until 1897, when Breitkopf & Härtel published it in an edition edited by Eusebius Mandyczewski.

== Structure ==
The composition, which is written for a violin soloist and an accompanying group made up of violins, violas & cellos, (Note: This accompanying group can be as small as a standard string quartet.) is structured as a single multi-tempo movement divided into two sections, the Introduction (Marked: Adagio) and the Rondo (Marked: Allegro giusto). It takes around 13 – 15 minutes to perform.
