= JD McCrary =

American actor and singer

JayDon
- McCrary in 2026

Background information
- Born: JayDon Howard McCrary; July 18, 2007 (age 19); Granada Hills, California, U.S.
- Genres: R&B, pop
- Occupations: Singer-songwriter, actor, dancer
- Years active: 2015–present
- Labels: Zoo; Mega; Gamma

JayDon Howard McCrary (born July 18, 2007), known mononymously as JayDon (formerly as JD McCrary) is an American singer-songwriter, actor and dancer. He starred in The Lion King (2019) as the voice of young Simba, played Kenny Payne in The Paynes, and also appeared in the 2019 film Little. In 2025, he signed with Usher and L.A. Reid's record label Mega, as a joint venture with Gamma.

== Career ==
=== 2015–2019: Career beginnings and acting ===
McCrary began his acting career in 2015 at age 8 on K.C. Undercover, where he appeared on two episodes. In December 2016, he made a guest appearance on Childish Gambino's song "Terrified". He then had live performances on Little Big Shots singing The Jackson 5's "I Want You Back", The Ellen Show singing "Who's Lovin' You", and the 60th Annual Grammy Awards to support Childish Gambino's "Terrified". In December 2017, he sang the national anthem before a Los Angeles Clippers game after a viral singing display a few weeks prior. In 2017, he later appeared on I'm Dying Up Here and Teachers as minor roles.

On January 14, 2018, he released his first official single called "Inviting All of You". On August 13, 2018, it was announced that JD McCrary became the youngest artist to sign with Disney Music Group's Hollywood Records, as he released the music video to his second single "My Name" on August 28. On January 24, 2019, he released the first single after signing to the label called "Keep in Touch." He stars in The Paynes on the Oprah Winfrey Network.

In 2019, McCrary co-starred in the Universal comedy film Little, and provided the voice of young Simba in the live action remake of the Disney film The Lion King. McCrary said that "Donald Glover [who voices adult Simba] is so talented that [I] actually did have to take it into consideration, because if Simba is going to grow up to be some sort of figure and you know of it, you have to keep that motive." Also that year, McCrary portrayed a young Michael Jackson in the BET series American Soul, which premiered in February. On April 19, McCrary released his debut EP, Shine, which includes production from Jermaine Dupri and Bryan-Michael Cox.

=== 2024–present: Musical career ===
In 2024, McCrary rebranded his musical stage name to his birth-name, JayDon. On November 8, 2024, he released his first single under his new stage name, "Ah! Ah!" featuring 310babii. In 2025, it was announced that he officially signed with Usher and L.A. Reid's record label Mega in partnership with Larry Jackson's gamma. In 2025, he released his two singles, "Lullaby" and "I'll Be Good". The latter of which received a music video on April 24, 2025.

== Artistry ==
In an interview with Vibe, McCrary cited Michael Jackson as his biggest influence, as well as Chris Brown, Stevie Wonder, Bruno Mars, Justin Bieber, Omarion, Bobby Brown, Usher (whom he his currently signed to and mentored by) and Mario.

== Discography ==
=== Mixtapes ===
Title	Details
Me My Songs & I	Released: October 10, 2025; Label: Zoo, Mega, Gamma; Format: Digital download

=== Extended plays ===
Title	Details
Shine	Released: April 19, 2019; Label: Hollywood; Format: Digital download

=== Singles ===
Title	Year
"Inviting All of You"	2018
"My Name"	2018
"Keep in Touch"	2019
"Winter Wonderland"	2019
"Where Do I Belong"	2019
"Closer to Christmas"	2019
"Stuck With You" (with Coco Quinn)	2020
"Tell Me Why"	2020
"Walking on Air"	2020
"Don't Go"	2022
"Reminiscin" (featuring J.Dizzle)	2022
"Calendar"	2023
"Trip"	2024
"Ah! Ah!" (featuring 310babii)	2024
"Lullaby" (featuring Paradise)	2025
"I'll Be Good"	2025
"Lullaby Remix" (featuring Paradise, Jay Park, and Louis of Lngshot)	2025
"Lullaby Mega Remix" (featuring Paradise and Usher)	2025

=== Guest appearances ===
List of guest appearances, with other performing artists, showing year released and album name
Title	Other artist(s)	Year	Album
"Terrified"	Childish Gambino	2016	"Awaken, My Love!"
"Cautionary Tales"	Jon Bellion	2018	Glory Sound Prep
"This Neverland"	G Tom Mac	2018	A Lost Boys Story: The Musical (Original Score)
"I Just Can't Wait to Be King"	Shahadi Wright Joseph, John Oliver	2019	The Lion King: Original Motion Picture Soundtrack
"Hakuna Matata"	Billy Eichner, Seth Rogen, Donald Glover	2019	The Lion King: Original Motion Picture Soundtrack

== Filmography ==
=== Film ===
Year	Title	Role	Notes
2019	Little	Isaac	
2019	The Lion King	Young Simba (voice)	Nominated - Saturn Award for Best Performance by a Younger Actor
2022	13	Brett	
2023	Wish	Singing Animal	

=== Television ===
Year	Title	Role	Notes
2015	Blunt Talk	Singing kid	Episode: "A Beaver That's Lost Its Mind"
2015–16	K.C. Undercover	Young Ernie Cooper	2 episodes
2017	Teachers	Ayo	Episode: "Brokebitch Mountain"
2017	Little Big Shots	Himself	Episode: "Memory Lane"
2017	I'm Dying Up Here	Adam's brother	Episode: "The Unbelievable Power of Believing"
2018	The Paynes	Kenny Payne	
2019	American Soul	Young Michael Jackson	Episode: "68 BC"
