= Schubert's song cycles =

Group of works

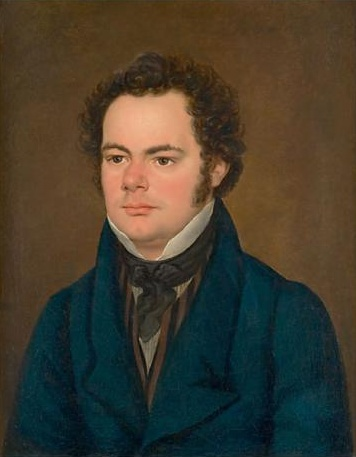
Portrait of Franz Schubert by Franz Eybl (1827)

Franz Schubert's best known song cycles, like Die schöne Müllerin and Winterreise, are based on separate poems with a common theme and narrative. Other song cycles are based on consecutive excerpts of the same literary work: Schubert's "Ave Maria" is part of such a song cycle based on excerpts of the same poem, in this case by Walter Scott.

When the poems of a group of songs have a common link, and are for this reason grouped under a single Deutsch number, but there is no common narrative, the collection is rather qualified as a song set than a song cycle. Some of Schubert's song cycles contain both Lieder for solo voice as well as part songs. There is, however, always a piano accompaniment.

== Don Gayseros ==
D 93, Song cycle Don Gayseros for voice and piano (1815?); lyrics from The Magic Ring by Friedrich de la Motte Fouqué:

1. "Don Gayseros I" ['Don Gayseros, wunderlicher, schöner Ritter']
2. "Don Gayseros II" ['Nächtens klang die süße Laute'] (fragment?)
3. "Don Gayseros III" ['An dem jungen Morgenhimmel'] (fragment?)

== Gesänge des Harfners aus "Wilhelm Meister" ==
Gesänge des Harfners aus "Wilhelm Meister" (The Songs of the Harpist from Wilhelm Meister), D 478 is a song cycle for voice and piano, first published in 1822 as Op. 12. The texts of the cycle derived from Goethe's Wilhelm Meister's Apprenticeship.

1. "Wer sich der Einsamkeit ergibt" ("Harfenspieler I" 2nd setting; 2nd version – 1822?)
2. "Wer nie sein Brot mit Tränen aß", formerly D 480 ("Harfenspieler III" 3rd setting – 1822)
3. "An die Türen will ich schleichen", formerly D 479 ("Harfenspieler II" 2nd version – 1822?)

Alternative settings and versions of the "Harfenspieler" texts:

- "Wer sich der Einsamkeit ergibt":
  - D 325 "Harfenspieler" (1815, first setting)
  - D 478 "Harfenspieler I" (1816, 1st version of 2nd setting; modified 2nd version)
- "An die Türen will ich schleichen":
  - D 478 (formerly D 479) "Harfenspieler II" (1816, 1st version; modified 2nd version)
- "Wer nie sein Brot mit Tränen aß":
  - D 478 (formerly D 480) "Harfenspieler III" (1816, 1st and 2nd settings; modified version of the 3rd setting)

== Vier Canzonen ==
D 688, Song cycle Vier Canzonen for voice and piano (1820):

1. "Non t'accostar all'urna"
2. "Guarda, che bianca luna"
3. "Da quel sembiante appresi"
4. "Mio ben, ricordati"

== Die schöne Müllerin ==
Op. 25 – D 795, Song cycle Die schöne Müllerin for voice and piano (1823):

1. "Das Wandern" ['Das Wandern ist des Müllers Lust']
2. "Wohin?" ['Ich hört' ein Bächlein rauschen']
3. "Halt!" ['Eine Mühle seh' ich blinken']
4. "Danksagung an den Bach" ['War es also gemeint']
5. "Am Feierabend" ['Hätt' ich tausend Arme zu rühren']
6. "Der Neugierige" ['Ich frage keine Blume']
7. "Ungeduld" ['Ich schnitt' es gern in alle Rinden ein']
8. "Morgengruß" ['Guten Morgen, schöne Müllerin']
9. "Des Müllers Blumen" ['Am Bach viel kleine Blumen stehn' ']
10. "Tränenregen" ['Wir saßen so traulich beisammen']
11. "Mein!" ['Bächlein, laß dein Rauschen sein']
12. "Pause" ['Meine Laute hab' ich gehängt an die Wand']
13. "Mit dem grünen Lautenbande" ['Schad' um das schöne grüne Band']
14. "Der Jäger" ['Was sucht denn der Jäger']
15. "Eifersucht und Stolz" ['Wohin so schnell']
16. "Die liebe Farbe" ['In Grün will ich mich kleiden']
17. "Die böse Farbe" ['Ich möchte zieh'n in die Welt hinaus']
18. "Trockne Blumen" ['Ihr Blümlein alle']
19. "Der Müller und der Bach" ['Wo ein treues Herze']
20. "Des Baches Wiegenlied" ['Gute Ruh', gute Ruh’ ']

D 795, alternative versions:

11. "Mein!" ['Bächlein, laß dein Rauschen sein'] (modified version)
13. "Mit dem grünen Lautenbande" ['Schad' um das schöne grüne Band'] (modified version)
18. "Trockne Blumen" ['Ihr Blümlein alle'] (modified version)
19. "Der Müller und der Bach" ['Wo ein treues Herze'] (modified version)

== Seven songs from Walter Scott's Lady of the Lake ==
Op. 52, Sieben Gesänge aus Walter Scotts "Fräulein am See" (Seven songs from Walter Scott's Lady of the Lake):

1. D 837, Song "Ellens Gesang I" ['Raste, Krieger, Krieg ist aus'] for voice and piano (1825)
2. D 838, Song "Ellens Gesang II" ['Jäger, ruhe von der Jagd!'] for voice and piano (1825)
3. D 835, Quartet "Bootgesang" ['Triumph, er naht'] for two tenors, two basses and piano (1825)
4. D 836, Chorus "Coronach (Totengesang der Frauen und Mädchen)" ['Er ist uns geschieden'] for women’s choir and piano, Totengesang der Frauen und Mädchen (1825)
5. D 846, Song "Normans Gesang" ['Die Nacht bricht bald herein'] for voice and piano (1825)
6. D 839, Song "Ellens Gesang III (Hymne an die Jungfrau)" ['Ave Maria! Jungfrau mild'] for voice and piano, Ave Maria or Hymne an die Jungfrau (1825)
7. D 843, Song "Lied des gefangenen Jägers" ['Mein Roß so müd'] for voice and piano (1825)

== Two scenes from the play "Lacrimas" ==
Op. posth. 124 – D 857, Two songs Zwei Szenen aus dem Schauspiel "Lacrimas" for voice and piano (1825):

1. "Lied der Delphine" ['Ach, was soll ich beginnen vor Liebe?']
2. "Lied des Florio" ['Nun, da Schatten niedergleiten']

== Vier Refrainlieder ==
Op. 95 – D 866, Song cycle Vier Refrainlieder for voice and piano (1828?):

1. "Die Unterscheidung" ['Die Mutter hat mich jüngst gescholten']
2. "Bei dir allein" ['Bei dir allein empfind ich, daß ich lebe']
3. "Die Männer sind méchant" ['Du sagtest mir es, Mutter']
4. "Irdisches Glück" ['So mancher sieht mit finstrer Miene']

== Songs from Wilhelm Meister ==
Op. 62 – D 877, Song cycle Gesänge aus "Wilhelm Meister" (1826):

1. "Mignon und der Harfner" ['Nur wer die Sehnsucht kennt'] for two voices and piano (5th setting)
2. "Lied der Mignon" ['Heiß mich nicht reden, heiß mich schweigen'] for voice and piano (2nd setting)
3. "Lied der Mignon" ['So laßt mich scheinen, bis ich werde'] for voice and piano (3rd setting)
4. "Lied der Mignon" ['Nur wer die Sehnsucht kennt'] for voice and piano (6th setting)

D 877, alternative versions:

2. "Lied der Mignon" ['Heiß mich nicht reden, heiß mich schweigen'] for voice and piano (2nd setting, modified version)

== Three songs ==
Op. 83 – D 902, "Drei Gesänge" for bass and piano (1827):

1. "L'incanto degli occhi; Die Macht der Augen" ['Da voi, cari lumi'; 'Nur euch, schöne Sterne'] (2nd setting)
2. "Il traditor deluso; Der getäuschte Verräter" ['Ahimè, io tremo!'; 'Weh mir, ich bebe!']
3. "Il modo di prender moglie; Die Art ein Weib zu nehmen" ['Orsù! non ci pensiamo'; 'Wohlan! und ohne Zagen']

== Winterreise ==
Op. 89 – D 911, Song cycle Winterreise for voice and piano (1827):

1. "Gute Nacht" ['Fremd bin ich eingezogen']
2. "Die Wetterfahne" ['Der Wind spielt mit der Wetterfahne']
3. "Gefror’ne Tränen" ['Gefror’ne Tropfen fallen']
4. "Erstarrung" ['Ich such’ im Schnee vergebens']
5. "Der Lindenbaum" ['Am Brunnen vor dem Tore']
6. "Wasserflut" ['Manche Trän’ aus meinen Augen']
7. "Auf dem Flusse" ['Der du so lustig rauschtest'] (2nd version)
8. "Rückblick" ['Es brennt mir unter beiden Sohlen']
9. "Irrlicht" ['In die tiefsten Felsengründe']
10. "Rast" ['Nun merk’ ich erst, wie müd ich bin'] (2nd version)
11. "Frühlingstraum" ['Ich träumte von bunten Blumen'] (2nd version)
12. "Einsamkeit" ['Wie eine trübe Wolke']
13. "Die Post" ['Von der Straße her ein Posthorn klingt']
14. "Der greise Kopf" ['Der Reif hat einen weißen Schein']
15. "Die Krähe" ['Eine Krähe war mit mir aus der Stadt gezogen']
16. "Letzte Hoffnung" ['Hie und da ist an den Bäumen']
17. "Im Dorfe" ['Es bellen die Hunde']
18. "Der stürmische Morgen" ['Wie hat der Sturm zerrissen']
19. "Täuschung" ['Ein Licht tanzt freundlich vor mir her']
20. "Der Wegweiser" ['Was vermeid’ ich denn die Wege']
21. "Das Wirtshaus" ['Auf einen Totenacker hat mich mein Weg gebracht']
22. "Mut" ['Fliegt der Schnee mir ins Gesicht'] (2nd version)
23. "Die Nebensonnen" ['Drei Sonnen sah ich'] (2nd version)
24. "Der Leiermann" ['Drüben hinterm Dorfe steht ein Leiermann']

D 911, alternative versions:

7. "Auf dem Flusse" ['Der du so lustig rauschtest'] (1st version)
10. "Rast" ['Nun merk’ ich erst, wie müd ich bin'] (1st version)
11. "Frühlingstraum" ['Ich träumte von bunten Blumen'] (1st version)
22. "Mut" ['Fliegt der Schnee mir ins Gesicht'] (1st version)
23. "Die Nebensonnen" ['Drei Sonnen sah ich'] (1st version)

== Schwanengesang ==
D 957, Not a song cycle, but a collection compiled by the publisher. 13 Lieder nach Gedichten von Rellstab und Heine for voice and piano (1828, published as Schwanengesang, with "Die Taubenpost" as 14th song added to the cycle). The first seven songs of the cycle are on poems by Ludwig Rellstab, the next six on poems by Heinrich Heine. D 965a "Die Taubenpost" on a poem by Johann Gabriel Seidl, presumably the last song Schubert composed, was added to the cycle by the publisher.

1. "Liebesbotschaft" ['Rauschendes Bächlein, so silber und hell']
2. "Kriegers Ahnung" ['In tiefer Ruh liegt um mich her']
3. "Frühlingssehnsucht" ['Säuselnde Lüfte wehen so mild']
4. "Ständchen" ['Leise flehen meine Lieder'], Serenade (original and modified versions)
5. "Aufenthalt" ['Rauschender Strom, brausender Wald']
6. "In der Ferne" ['Wehe dem Fliehenden']
7. "Abschied" ['Ade! du muntre, du fröhliche Stadt']
8. "Der Atlas" ['Ich unglückselger Atlas']
9. "Ihr Bild" ['Ich stand in dunkeln Träumen']
10. "Das Fischermädchen" ['Du schönes Fischermädchen']
11. "Die Stadt" ['Am fernen Horizonte']
12. "Am Meer" ['Das Meer erglänzte weit hinaus']
13. "Der Doppelgänger" ['Still ist die Nacht, es ruhen die Gassen']
14. "Die Taubenpost"

== Auf den wilden Wegen ==
Auf den wilden Wegen: songs from the Poetisches Tagebuch of Ernst Schulze is pianist Graham Johnson's proposal to group Schubert's ten settings of poems from Ernst Schulze's Poetisches Tagebuch in a single song cycle:

1. D 853 – "Auf der Bruck" ("Auf der Brücke")
2. D 862 – "Um Mitternacht"
3. D 874 – "O Quell, was strömst du rasch und wild" (completed by Reinhard van Hoorickx)
4. D 861 – "Der liebliche Stern"
5. D 876 – "Im Jänner 1817 (Tiefes Leid)"
6. D 834 – "Im Walde"
7. D 882 – "Im Frühling"
8. D 883 – "Lebensmut"
9. D 884 – "Über Wildemann"
10. D 860 – "An mein Herz"

== Sources ==
- AGA: Franz Schubert's Works (various editors and editions)
- Otto Erich Deutsch (and others) Schubert Thematic Catalogue (various editions)
- NSE: Neue Schubert-Ausgabe (various editors and publication dates)
- Eva Badura-Skoda and Peter Branscombe. Schubert Studies: Problems of Style and Chronology. Cambridge University Press, 1982. Reprint 2008. ISBN 0521088720 ISBN 9780521088725 ISBN 9780521226066
- Brian Newbould. Schubert: The Music and the Man. University of California Press, 1999. ISBN 0520219570 ISBN 9780520219571
- Reinhard Van Hoorickx. "Franz Schubert (1797–1828) List of the Dances in Chronological Order" in Revue belge de Musicologie/Belgisch Tijdschrift voor Muziekwetenschap, Vol. 25, No. 1/4, pp. 68–97, 1971
- Reinhard Van Hoorickx. "Thematic Catalogue of Schubert's Works: New Additions, Corrections and Notes" in Revue belge de Musicologie/Belgisch Tijdschrift voor Muziekwetenschap, Vol. 28/30, pp. 136–171, 1974—1976.
