= Johann Uz =

German poet (1720–1796)

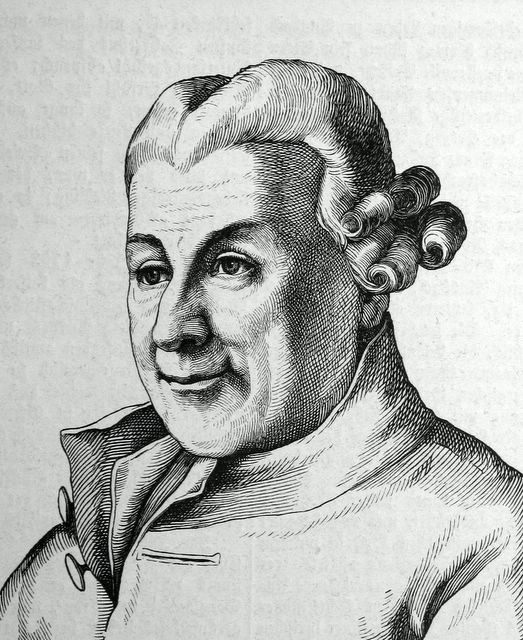
Johann Uz.

Johann Peter Uz (October 3, 1720 – May 12, 1796) was a German poet.

== Life ==
He was born at Ansbach. He studied law in 1739–43 at the university of Halle, where he associated with the Rococo poets Johann Gleim and Johann Nikolaus Götz, and in conjunction with the latter translated the odes of Anacreon (1746).

In 1748 Uz was appointed unpaid secretary to the Justizcollegium, an office he held for twelve years; in 1763 he became assessor to the imperial court of justice at Nuremberg, in 1790 was made a judge.

A monument to Uz stands in the Ansbach Court Garden. It was near this monument, in 1833, that Kaspar Hauser was murdered.
