= Lullaby (JayDon and Paradise song) =

2025 single by JayDon and Paradise

Single by JayDon and Paradise

from the album Me My Songs & I
- Released: February 14, 2025
- Genre: R&B
- Length: 3:37
- Label: Zoo; Mega; Gamma
- Songwriters: Felisha King Harvey; Bernard Harvey; Avery Williams-Wright
- Producers: Harv; Scott Carter; King Harvey

JayDon singles chronology
"Ah! Ah!" (2024)	"Lullaby" (2025)	"I'll Be Good" (2025)

Paradise singles chronology
"Foggin' Up the Windows" (2025)	"Lullaby" (2025)	"Highway" (2025)

Music video
- "Lullaby" on YouTube

"Lullaby" is a song by American R&B singers JayDon and Paradise. It was released on February 14, 2025 as the lead single from the former's debut mixtape Me My Songs & I (2025). The song was written by Felisha King Harvey of Cherish, Avery Williams-Wright and Bernard Harvey and produced by Harv, with vocal production from ,Scott Carter and King Harvey, A&R Dashawn “Happie” White.

== Composition ==
The song is an R&B ballad that finds JayDon singing about a girl who brings him comfort, comparing her to a lullaby. Paradise performs the third verse.

== Music video ==
The music video was directed by Maseo Refuerzo and released in June 2025. In it, JayDon dances against an azure backdrop, while Paradise performs in front of a black background and is accompanied by a woman.

== Remixes ==
The song has received two official remixes. The first, featuring American rapper Jay Park and Louis of the South Korean boy band Lngshot, was released on November 21, 2025.

The second, titled "Lullaby (Mega Remix)", features American singer Usher and was released on December 12, 2025. On the Mega Remix, the first, second and third verses are performed by Usher, JayDon and Paradise respectively. The latter two add new lyrics. Gail Mitchell of Billboard described the remix as "wrapped in a vibrant, mid-tempo groove that perfectly accentuates the trio's sparkling harmonies and soulful riffs." Tallie Spencer of HotNewHipHop wrote "The chemistry between all three artists feels natural, with each voice fitting comfortably into the song's slow-burn energy. Rather than feeling like a simple add-on, the remix plays like a true upgrade."

== Charts ==
Chart performance for "Lullaby"
Chart (2026)	Peak position
US Bubbling Under Hot 100 (Billboard)	18
US Hot R&B/Hip-Hop Songs (Billboard)	39
US Rhythmic Airplay (Billboard)	16
