= João José Baldi =

Portuguese composer

João José Baldi (1770–1816) was a composer who was pianist at the court of the Marquis of Alorna and opera conductor in Leiria. He was born in Lisbon, Portugal. He was a classical composer who composed mostly religious music: requiems. He was known in Leiria for his operas. He died in Lisbon.
