= String Quartet No. 11 (Schubert) =

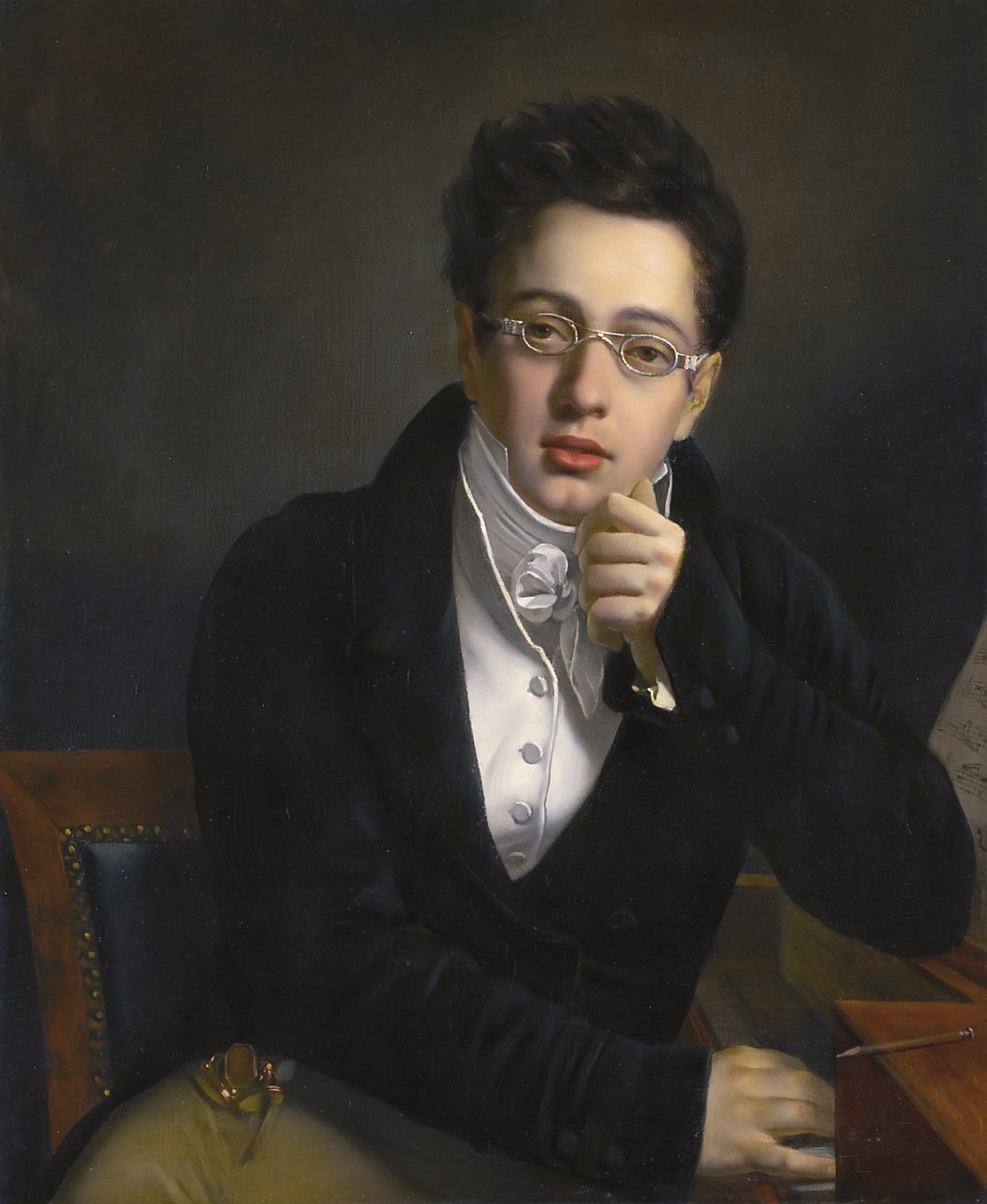
Possible portrait of the young Franz Schubert c. 1814, attributed to Josef Abel

The String Quartet No. 11 (D 353) in E major was composed by Franz Schubert in 1816. It was posthumously published as Op. 125 No. 2.

== Movements ==
The string quartet has four movements:

1. Allegro con fuoco (E major)
2. Andante (A major)
3. Menuetto: Allegro vivace (E major, with Trio in C major)
4. Rondo: Allegro vivace (E major)

== Sources ==
- Franz Schubert's Works, Series V: Streichquartette edited by Joseph Hellmesberger and Eusebius Mandyczewski. Breitkopf & Härtel, 1890.
- Otto Erich Deutsch (and others). Schubert Thematic Catalogue (several editions), No. 353.
- New Schubert Edition, Series VI, Volume 4: String Quartets II edited by Werner Aderhold, Bärenreiter, 1994.
