= Johann Nepomuk Fuchs (composer) =

Austrian composer, opera conductor, teacher and editor (1842–1899)

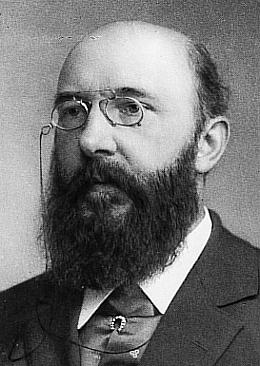
Johann Nepomuk Fuchs

Johann Nepomuk Fuchs (5 May 1842 – 5 October 1899) was an Austrian composer, opera conductor, teacher and editor. His editorial work included an important role in the preparation of the first complete edition of Franz Schubert's works. He was an older brother of the composer Robert Fuchs.

== Life and works ==
Johann Nepomuk Fuchs was born on 5 May 1842 at Frauental in Styria in the south of Austria. His youngest brother was the composer and music teacher Robert Fuchs. Johann studied musical theory in Vienna with the prominent theorist and composer Simon Sechter, with whom Schubert had planned to study. In 1864, he was appointed Kapellmeister of the Bratislava Opera. He also conducted opera outside Bratislava, in Brno, Kassel, Cologne, Hamburg, and Leipzig, before moving to the Vienna Court Opera in 1880.

In 1888, Fuchs joined the faculty of the Vienna Conservatory, where the composer Alexander von Zemlinsky was one of his students of composition. Other notable students included composers Edmund Eysler, Leo Fall and Rubin Goldmark, and the theorist and composer Heinrich Schenker. In 1893, Fuchs succeeded Joseph Hellmesberger Sr. as director of the conservatory. Further recognition followed in 1894, when he was appointed Vice Hofkapellmeister for his services at the Vienna Court Opera.

Fuchs composed operatic and incidental music for the theatre, as well as lieder and piano pieces. His one opera, Zingara, was first staged in Brno in 1872.

As an editor, Fuchs worked on editions of operas, including Gluck's Le cadi dupé, Handel's Almira and Schubert's Alfonso und Estrella. He helped prepare the first edition of the entire Schubert canon, the Schubert-Gesamtausgabe published by Breitkopf & Härtel, editing the works for the theatre, as well as some of the orchestral scores.

He died at Bad Vöslau in Lower Austria on 5 October 1899.
