= Der Wanderer =

Song composed by Franz Schubert

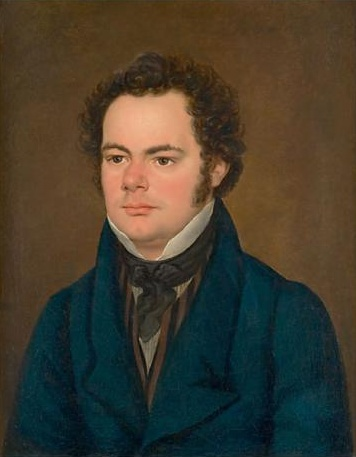
Portrait of Franz Schubert by Franz Eybl (1827)

"Der Wanderer" (D 489) [formerly D 493] is a lied composed by Franz Schubert in October 1816 for voice and piano. A revised version was published near the end of May 1821 as opus 4, number 1. The words are taken from a German poem by Georg Philipp Schmidt (von Lübeck). The lied is set in the key of C-sharp minor with the tempo marking sehr langsam (very slow) and the time signature alla breve. The piece has a total of 72 measures. Schubert wrote another lied entitled "Der Wanderer;" it is numbered D.649.

== Description ==
The song begins with a recitative, describing the setting: mountains, a steaming valley, the roaring sea. The wanderer is strolling quietly, unhappily, and asks, sighing, the question: "where?"

The next section, consisting of 8 bars of a slow melody sung in pianissimo, describes the feelings of the wanderer: the sun seems cold, the blossom withered, life old. The wanderer expresses the conviction of being a stranger everywhere. This 8-bar section was later used by Schubert as theme on which his Wanderer Fantasy is based.

Next the music shifts to the key of E major, the tempo increases and the time signature changes to 6/8. The wanderer asks: "where are you my beloved land?" This place the wanderer longs for is described as green with hope, "the land where my roses bloom, my friends stroll, my dead rise" and, finally, "the land which speaks my language, Oh land, where are you?" Towards the end of this section, the music gets quite animated and forms the climax of the song.

Finally, the music returns to the original minor key and slow tempo. After quoting the question "where?" from the opening, the song closes with a "ghostly breath" finally answering the question: "There where you are not, there is happiness." The song closes in the key of E major.

== Song lyrics ==
Ich komme vom Gebirge her,

Es dampft das Tal, es braust das Meer.

Ich wandle still, bin wenig froh,

Und immer fragt der Seufzer, wo?

Die Sonne dünkt mich hier so kalt,

Die Blüte welk, das Leben alt,

Und was sie reden, leerer Schall;

Ich bin ein Fremdling überall.

Wo bist du, mein geliebtes Land?

Gesucht, geahnt, und nie gekannt!

Das Land, das Land so hoffnungsgrün,

Das Land, wo meine Rosen blühn.

Wo meine Träume wandeln gehn,

Wo meine Toten auferstehn,

Das Land, das meine Sprache spricht,

O Land, wo bist du? . . .

Ich wandle still, bin wenig froh,

Und immer fragt der Seufzer, wo?

Im Geisterhauch tönt's mir zurück:

"Dort, wo du nicht bist, dort ist das Glück."
