= Stabat Mater in F minor (Schubert) =

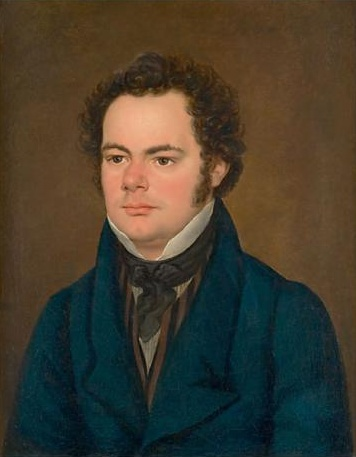
Portrait of Franz Schubert by Franz Eybl (1827)

Stabat Mater in F minor, D 383, is a musical setting of the Stabat Mater sequence, composed by Franz Schubert in 1816. It is scored for soprano, tenor and bass soloists, SATB choir, 2 flutes, 2 oboes, 2 bassoons, contrabassoon, 2 french horns, 3 trombones, violin I and II, viola, cello and double bass.

Rather than setting the Latin sequence of the Stabat Mater, Schubert used a German paraphrase by F. G. Klopstock, Jesus Christus schwebt am Kreuze. The work is sometimes referred to as the Deutsches Stabat Mater, and was written for the composer's brother Ferdinand.

Schubert had written a shorter setting of the Latin Stabat Mater in 1815, Stabat Mater in G minor, D 175, a single-movement piece of approximately six minutes' duration, using only four verses of the twenty stanzas of the sequence.

== Structure ==
This setting is essentially a short oratorio with arias, duets, trios and chorus work. The work is divided into twelve movements. Performances require 30–40 minutes.

1. "Jesus Christus schwebt am Kreuze" Largo, F minor, common time; choir
2. "Bei des Mittlers Kreuze standen" B♭ minor, 3/8; soprano
3. "Liebend neiget er sein Antlitz" Andante, E♭ major, cut common time; choir
  The recurring theme in the original version is based on the Kaiser Hymn. Schubert revised this later, believing it to be inappropriate.
  It is unknown if the allusion to the hymn was a patriotic gesture, or an homage to Haydn.
4. "Engel freuten sich der Wonne" Allegretto, B♭ major, 2/4; soprano and tenor duet
5. "Wer wird Zähren" Larghetto, G minor ending in G major, 3/4; chorus (divisi)
6. "Ach, was hätten wir empfunden" Adagio, C minor, common time; tenor
7. "Erben sollen sie am Throne" C major, common time; chorus
  Schubert authorised cuts in this movement from bars 19–46, and bars 65–71.
8. "Sohn des Vaters, aber leiden" Andantino, G major, 3/8; bass
9. "O du herrlicher Vollender" Maestoso, E major, cut common time; chorus
10. "Erdenfreuden und ihr Elend" Allegretto moderato, A major, common time; trio
  — "Möcht ich wie auf Adlers Flügeln"... Più mosso, A minor, common time
11. "Daß dereinst wir, wenn im Tode" Andante sostenuto, F major, 3/4; trio and choir
12. "Amen" Allegro maestoso, F major, cut common time; chorus
  Schubert authorised a cut in this movement from bars 101-115.
