= None but the Lonely Heart (Tchaikovsky) =

Musical setting of "Harpist's Song" by Lev Mei, composed by Pyotr Ilyich Tchaikovsky

Pyotr Ilyich Tchaikovsky composed a set of six romances for voice and piano, Op. 6, in late 1869; the last of these songs is the melancholy "None but the Lonely Heart" (Russian: Нет, только тот, кто знал, romanized: Net, tol'ko tot, kto znal), a setting of Lev Mei's poem "The Harpist's Song" which in turn was a translation of "Nur wer die Sehnsucht kennt" from Goethe's Wilhelm Meister's Apprenticeship.

Tchaikovsky dedicated this piece to Alina Khvostova. The song was premiered by Russian mezzo-soprano Yelizaveta Lavrovskaya in Moscow in 1870, following it with its Saint Petersburg premiere the following year during an all-Tchaikovsky concert hosted by Nikolai Rubinstein; the latter was the first concert devoted entirely to Tchaikovsky's works.

== Text ==
Mei's Russian translation (transliteration)
Net, tol'ko tot,
kto znal svidan'ja, zhazhdu,
pojmjot, kak ja stradal
i kak ja strazhdu.
Gljazhu ja vdal'...
net sil, tusknejet oko...
Akh, kto menja ljubil
i znal — daleko!
Akh, tol'ko tot,
kto znal svidan'ja zhazhdu,
pojmjot, kak ja stradal
i kak ja strazhdu.
Vsja grud' gorit...

Goethe's original
Nur wer die Sehnsucht kennt
weiß, was ich leide!
Allein und abgetrennt
von aller Freude,
seh ich ans Firmament
nach jener Seite.

Ach! der mich liebt und kennt,
ist in der Weite.
Es schwindelt mir, es brennt
mein Eingeweide.
Nur wer die Sehnsucht kennt
Weiß, was ich leide!

An English translation
None but the lonely heart
knows what I suffer!
Alone and parted
from all joy,
I see the firmament
in that direction.

Alas, who loves and knows me
is far away.
I'm dizzy, it burns
my entrails.
None but the lonely heart
knows what I suffer.

== Notable recordings ==
- Mario Lanza (in English)
- Frank Sinatra, four recordings: as a V-Disc in 1946, again in 1946 and 1947 (all for Columbia Records, arranged by Axel Stordahl), and finally in 1959 for the Capitol Records album No One Cares, arranged by Gordon Jenkins (in English)
- Leonard Warren (in English)
- Lawrence Tibbett (in English)
- Rosa Ponselle (with German text)
- Elisabeth Schwarzkopf (with German text)
- Fritz Wunderlich (with German text)
- Boris Christoff (with Russian text)
- Plácido Domingo and Itzhak Perlman (with Russian text)
- Dmitri Hvorostovsky (with Russian text)
- Pavel Lisitsian (with Russian text)
- Ray Conniff (Instrumental)
