= String Trios (Schubert) =

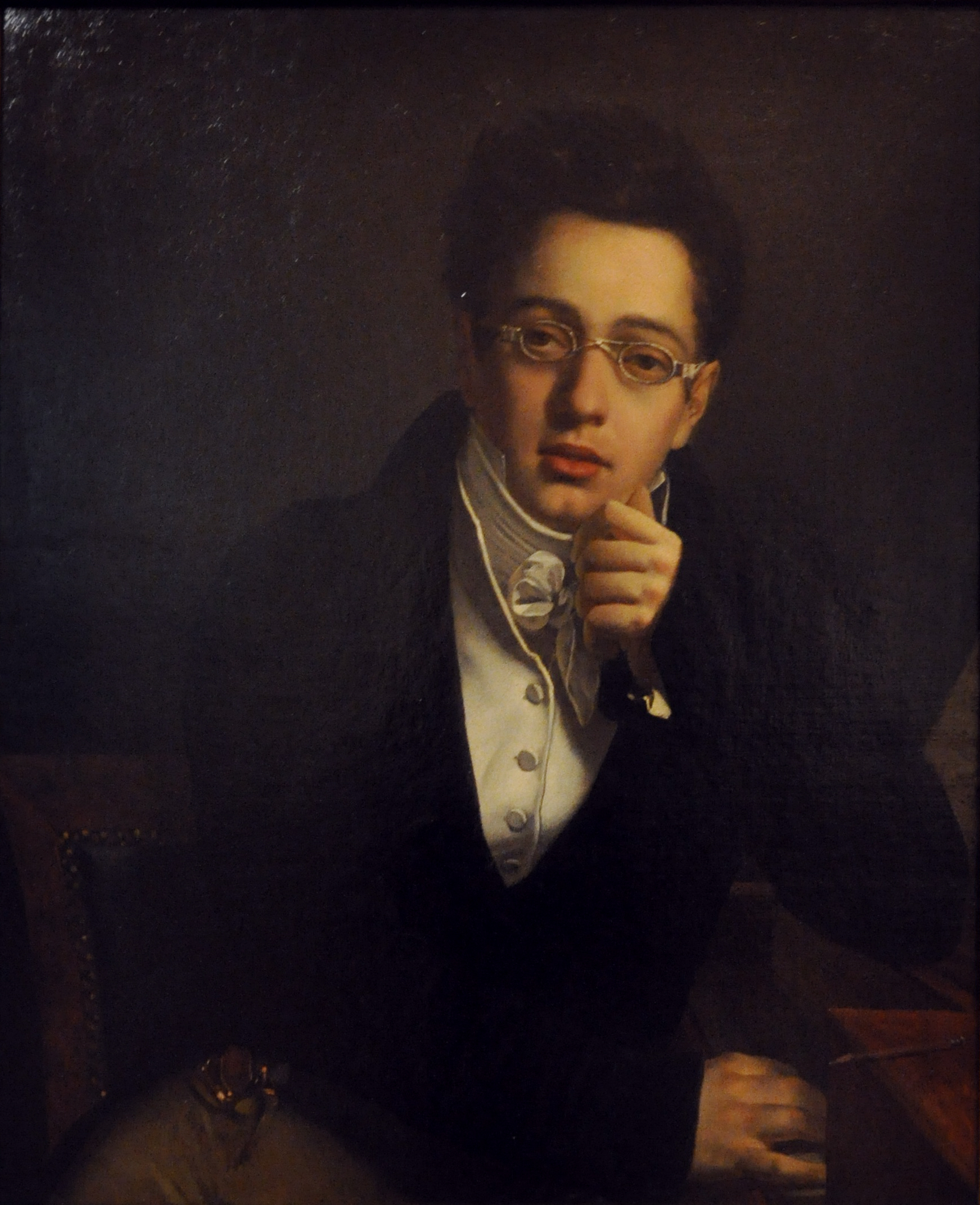
Schubert around the time of the work's composition

Franz Schubert wrote three string trios, all of them in the key of B♭ major. From the first of these, D 111A, a trio Schubert wrote in 1814, only a few measures are extant. The string trio D 471 consists of a completed first movement and an incomplete second movement, composed in 1816. The last of these trios, D 581, was completed in four movements, exists in two versions and was composed in 1817.

== String Trio in B♭ major, D 111A ==
A few bars of an Allegro movement is all that is left of the string trio D 111A, composed in September 1814. The fragment is printed in the New Schubert Edition.

== String Trio in B♭ major, D 471 ==
Schubert started composing this piece in September 1816, but only finished the first movement. In 1890, this movement was the only content of Series VI, Trio für Streichinstrument of the Alte Gesamt-Ausgabe, and was as such republished by Dover Editions in 1965. The second unfinished movement was first published in 1897, in the first volume of the Revisionsbericht of the Alte Gesamt-Ausgabe.

1. Allegro, 4/4 in sonata form
2. Andante sostenuto, 3/4 (fragment) in E♭ major

== String Trio in B♭ major, D 581 ==
Schubert wrote this string trio in September 1817, and it consists of four movements. The Alte Gesamt-Ausgabe published this trio in 1897 as No. 5 in Serie XXI: Supplement, Volume 1. Both versions of this string trio were published in Series VI, Volume 6 of the New Schubert Edition in 1981.

1. Allegro moderato, 4/4
2. Andante, 6/8 (F major)
3. Menuetto: Allegretto, 3/4 – Trio (E♭ major)
4. Rondo: Allegretto, 2/4 grazioso
