= Mignon (Schubert) =

Several songs by Franz Schubert

Mignon, a character appearing in Johann Wolfgang von Goethe's writings such as Wilhelm Meister's Apprenticeship and Wilhelm Meister's Journeyman Years, is the subject of several Lieder by Franz Schubert.

== "An Mignon" ==
Schubert had started to compose songs on texts by Goethe in 1814, among which is "Gretchen am Spinnrade," published as his Op. 2 in 1821. His first Mignon-related song was a setting of "An Mignon" ['Über Tal und Fluß getragen'], a poem published by Goethe in 1797. Schubert set it as a song for voice and piano in February 1815, D 161. Together with fifteen other songs he had composed on Goethe's texts Schubert sent a fair copy of this song to Goethe in 1816.

A second version of this setting was published by Anton Diabelli in 1825 as No. 2 in Schubert's Op. 19, dedicated to Goethe. The earlier version was not published before it was included in the Franz Schubert's Works edition in 1894. In the New Schubert Edition both versions were published in Series IV, Volume 1.

== "Mignon" (Kennst du das Land?) ==
Like Schubert's four songs Op. 62, also D 321, "Kennst du das Land? (Mignons Gesang)" for voice and piano is based on Goethe's Wilhelm Meister's Apprenticeship, in this case Book III, Chapter 1. Schubert composed it in 1815 (two versions). It was first published in 1832.

== Songs from Wilhelm Meister ==
Op. 62 – D 877, Song cycle Gesänge aus "Wilhelm Meister" (1826)

1. "Mignon und der Harfner" ['Nur wer die Sehnsucht kennt'] for two voices and piano (5th setting)
2. "Lied der Mignon" ['Heiß mich nicht reden, heiß mich schweigen'] for voice and piano (2nd setting)
3. "Lied der Mignon" ['So laßt mich scheinen, bis ich werde'] for voice and piano (3rd setting)
4. "Lied der Mignon" ['Nur wer die Sehnsucht kennt'] for voice and piano (6th setting)

D 877, alternative versions:

2. "Lied der Mignon" ['Heiß mich nicht reden, heiß mich schweigen'] for voice and piano (2nd setting, modified version)

=== Earlier settings of the same texts ===
==== Nur wer die Sehnsucht kennt ====
- D 310, Song "Sehnsucht" ['Nur wer die Sehnsucht kennt'] for voice and piano (1815, 1st setting; 1st and 2nd versions)
- D 359, Song "Sehnsucht" ['Nur wer die Sehnsucht kennt'] for voice and piano, Lied der Mignon (1816, 2nd setting)
- D 481, Song "Sehnsucht" ['Nur wer die Sehnsucht kennt'] for voice and piano, Lied der Mignon (1816, 3rd setting)
- D 656, Quintet "Sehnsucht" ['Nur wer die Sehnsucht kennt'] for two tenors and three basses (1819, 4th setting)

==== Heiß mich nicht reden, heiß mich schweigen ====
- D 726, Song "Mignon I" ['Heiß mich nicht reden, heiß mich schweigen'] for voice and piano (1821, 1st setting)

==== So laßt mich scheinen, bis ich werde ====
- D 469, Song "Mignon (So laßt mich scheinen, bis ich werde)" ['So laßt mich scheinen, bis ich werde'] for voice and piano (1816, 1st setting; 1st and 2nd versions; both are fragments)
- D 727, Song "Mignon II" ['So laßt mich scheinen, bis ich werde'] for voice and piano (1821, 2nd setting)

== Sources ==
- (in German) Otto Erich Deutsch, with revisions by Werner Aderhold and others. Franz Schubert, thematisches Verzeichnis seiner Werke in chronologischer Folge (New Schubert Edition Series VIII Supplement, Volume 4). Kassel: Bärenreiter, 1978. ISMN 9790006305148 — ISBN 9783761805718
