= Wiegenlied, D 498 (Schubert) =

1816 German lullaby by Franz Schubert

First two measures of the melody

Franz Schubert's Wiegenlied "Schlafe, schlafe, holder süßer Knabe", D 498, Op. 98, No. 2, is a lullaby composed in November 1816. The song is also known as "Mille cherubini in coro" after an Italian language arrangement for voice and orchestra by Alois Melichar.

== Lyrics ==
The author of the lyrics is unknown; they are sometimes attributed to Matthias Claudius, but the poem does not appear in Claudius' collected works.

Original German lyrics

Schlafe, schlafe, holder, süßer Knabe,
leise wiegt dich deiner Mutter Hand;
sanfte Ruhe, milde Labe
bringt dir schwebend dieses Wiegenband.

Schlafe, schlafe in dem süßen Grabe,
noch beschützt dich deiner Mutter Arm;
alle Wünsche, alle Habe
faßt sie liebend, alle liebewarm.

Schlafe, schlafe in der Flaumen Schoße,
noch umtönt dich lauter Liebeston;
eine Lilie, eine Rose,
nach dem Schlafe werd' sie dir zum Lohn.

Direct English translation

Sleep, sleep, gracious, sweet boy,
softly rocked by your mother's hand;
gentle rest, mild refreshment
brings you this floating cradle-strap.

Sleep, sleep in the sweet grave,
still protected by your mother's arms;
all her desires, all her possessions
she holds lovingly, glowing with love.

Sleep, sleep in the downy bosom,
still notes of love grow around you;
a lily, a rose,
after sleep they will reward you.

English lyrics by Chapman

Slumber, slumber, O my darling baby,
Gently rocked by Mother's gentle hand;
Softly rest and safely slumber,
While she swings thee by this cradle-band.

Slumber, slumber, all so sweetly buried,
Guarded by thy mother's loving arm;
All her wishes, all possessions,
And her love, shall shelter thee from harm.

Slumber, slumber, warm thy nest and downy,
Many a loving song for thee she'll sing;
Then a rosebud and a lily,
When thou wakest, she to thee will bring.

== Related works ==
Alois Melichar arranged Wiegenlied along with incidental music from Schubert's opera Rosamunde to form the song "Mille cherubini in coro" for the 1935 film Vergiß mein nicht. It was performed by the tenor Beniamino Gigli with the Berlin State Opera Orchestra.

In more recent times the song was notably sung by tenor Luciano Pavarotti, usually in his Christmas concerts.
