= Adagio and Rondo Concertante =

Musical composition by Franz Schubert

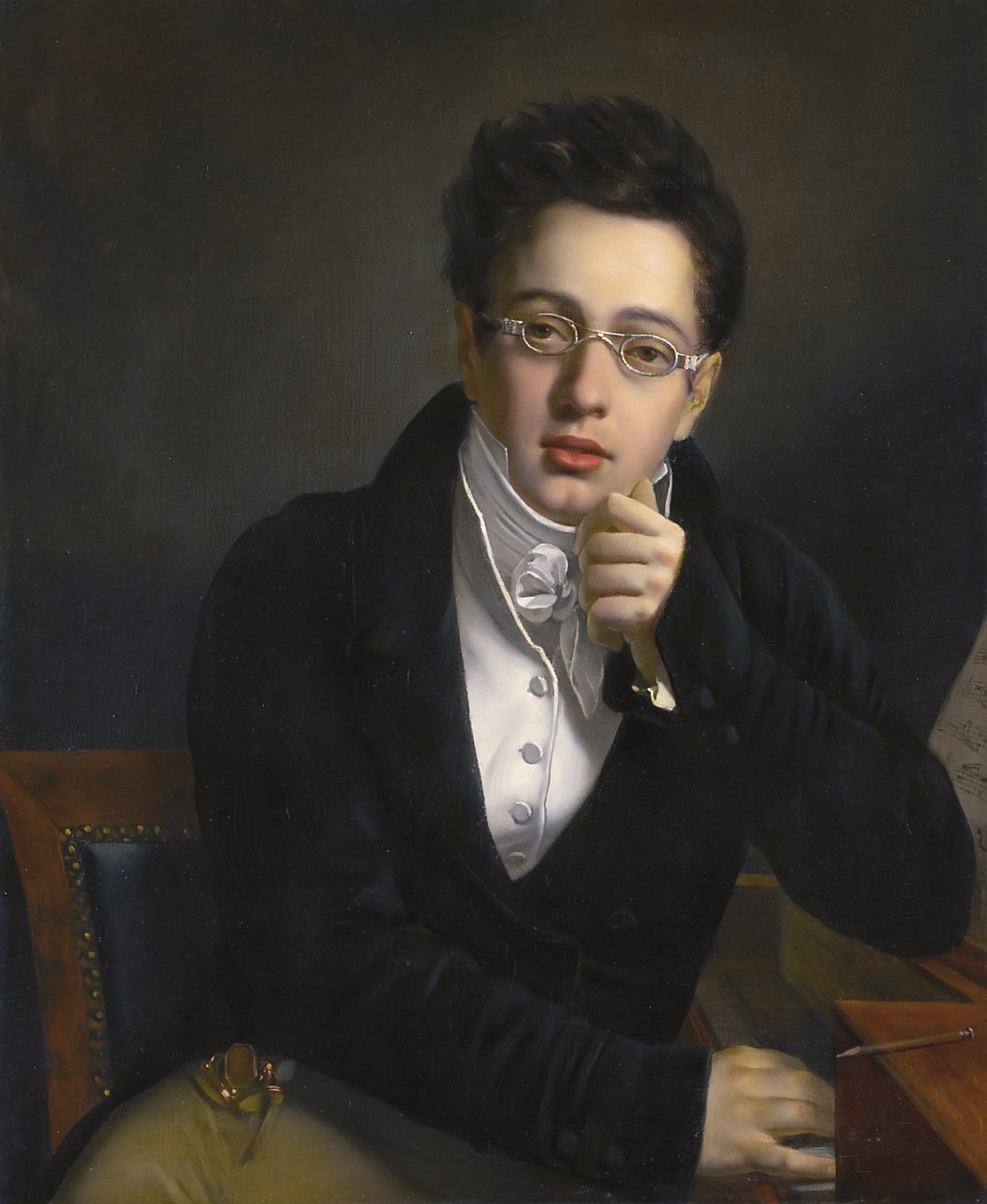
Possible portrait of the young Franz Schubert c. 1814, attributed to Josef Abel

The Adagio and Rondo Concertante (Adagio e Rondo concertante) in F major for piano quartet, D 487, was composed by Franz Schubert in 1816. A "brilliant" work designed as a display piece for the piano soloist, it is not only one of the few works the composer wrote in this style, but it is his first complete composition for piano and string ensemble, preceding the "Trout" Quintet" by three years.

== Background ==
Schubert apparently composed the quartet at the request of Heinrich Grob, the brother of Therese Grob, who at the time Schubert hoped to marry.

Offered to Diabelli after Schubert's death, the composition was not published until 1865.

The first known public performance of the quartet was on 1 November 1861 at the Ludwig Bösendorfer Salon in Vienna.

== Structure ==
The composition, which is written for a standard piano quartet is in two movements played continuously:

1. Adagio –
2. Rondo: Allegro vivace

The composition takes around 14–16 minutes to perform.
