= Nur wer die Sehnsucht kennt =

Poem by Johann Wolfgang von Goethe

"Nur wer die Sehnsucht kennt" ("Only he who knows yearning") is a poem by Johann Wolfgang von Goethe. The poem appears in the 11th chapter of Book Four of Goethe's novel Wilhelm Meister's Apprenticeship. In the novel, it is sung as a duet by Mignon and the harpist (Augustin) the latter being revealed as her father at the end of the novel.

The poem has been set to music by many composers, among them Beethoven, Schubert (six settings, the last two included in Gesänge aus "Wilhelm Meister, D 877), Schumann, Wolf and Tchaikovsky (via its translation into Russian by Lev Mei). Tchaikovsky's setting is often known in English as "None but the Lonely Heart" and has been set in many vocal, choral, and instrumental arrangements.

Nur wer die Sehnsucht kennt
Weiß, was ich leide!
Allein und abgetrennt
Von aller Freude,
Seh ich ans Firmament
Nach jener Seite.

Ach! der mich liebt und kennt,
Ist in der Weite.
Es schwindelt mir, es brennt
Mein Eingeweide.
Nur wer die Sehnsucht kennt
Weiß, was ich leide!

Only those who know longing
Know what sorrows me!
Alone and separated
From all joy,
I look into the sky
To the yonder side.

Ah! the one who loves and knows me
Is in the distance.
It dizzies me, it burns
my guts.
Only those who know longing
Know how I suffer!
