= Franz Eybl =

Austrian painter (1806–1880)

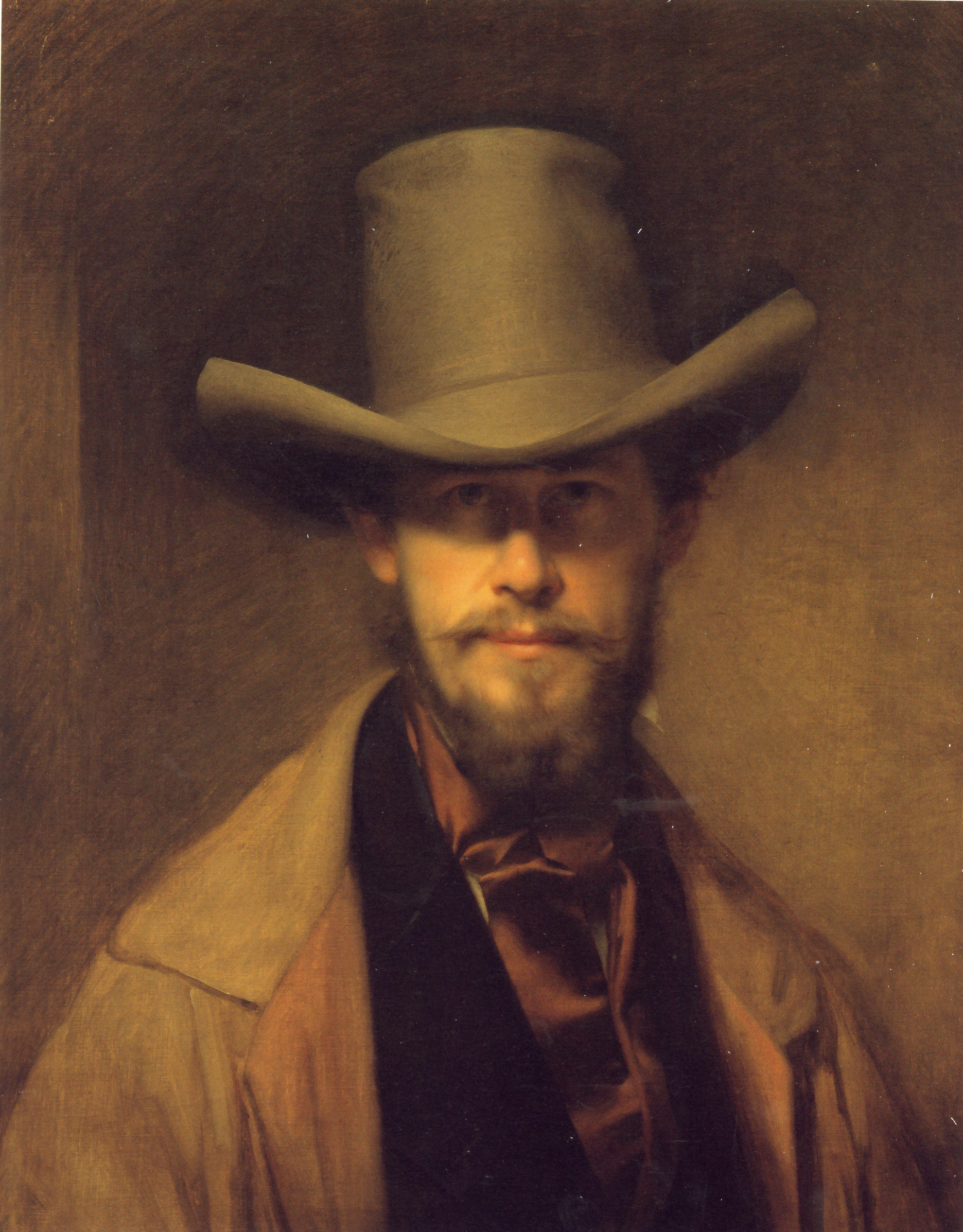
- Self-portrait (c. 1840)
- Born: Franz Eybl; 1 April 1806; Vienna, Austrian Empire
- Died: 29 April 1880 (aged 74); Vienna, Austria-Hungary

Franz Eybl (1 April 1806 – 29 April 1880) was an Austrian painter.

== Life ==
Eybl was born in the Viennese suburb of Gumpendorf at Große Steingasse 136 (today Stumpergasse 55). By 1816, at the age of ten, he had already entered the Academy of Fine Arts in Vienna, studying under Josef Klieber and Josef Mössmer. Between 1820 and 1823, he studied under Johann Baptist von Lampi and Franz Caucig, reproducing antique statues and casts. Until 1828 he studied history painting under Johann Peter Krafft and much of his work shows this. In 1825 Eybl won the Academy's Gundel-Prize and in 1828 the Lampi Prize. In 1830 he married Antonia Jordan. In 1843 Eybl became a member of the Academy. Eybl died at his official residence in Belvedere and buried at Vienna's famous Zentralfriedhof where notable figures such as Beethoven, Brahms and Schubert are interred. Eyblweg ("Eybl Way") in Leopoldau, Vienna was named after him in 1933.

He died at the age of 74 in 1880.

== Work ==
Franz Eybl devoted himself to landscape painting and genre works as well as history painting. After 1840 he became influenced by Ferdinand Georg Waldmüller in his use of light. He painted many portraits, and counted himself one of the most important portrait painters in 19th century Austria alongside Friedrich von Amerling. Eybl made over 400 lithographic portraits and is comparable with the prolific Josef Kriehuber in this aspect.

== List of works ==
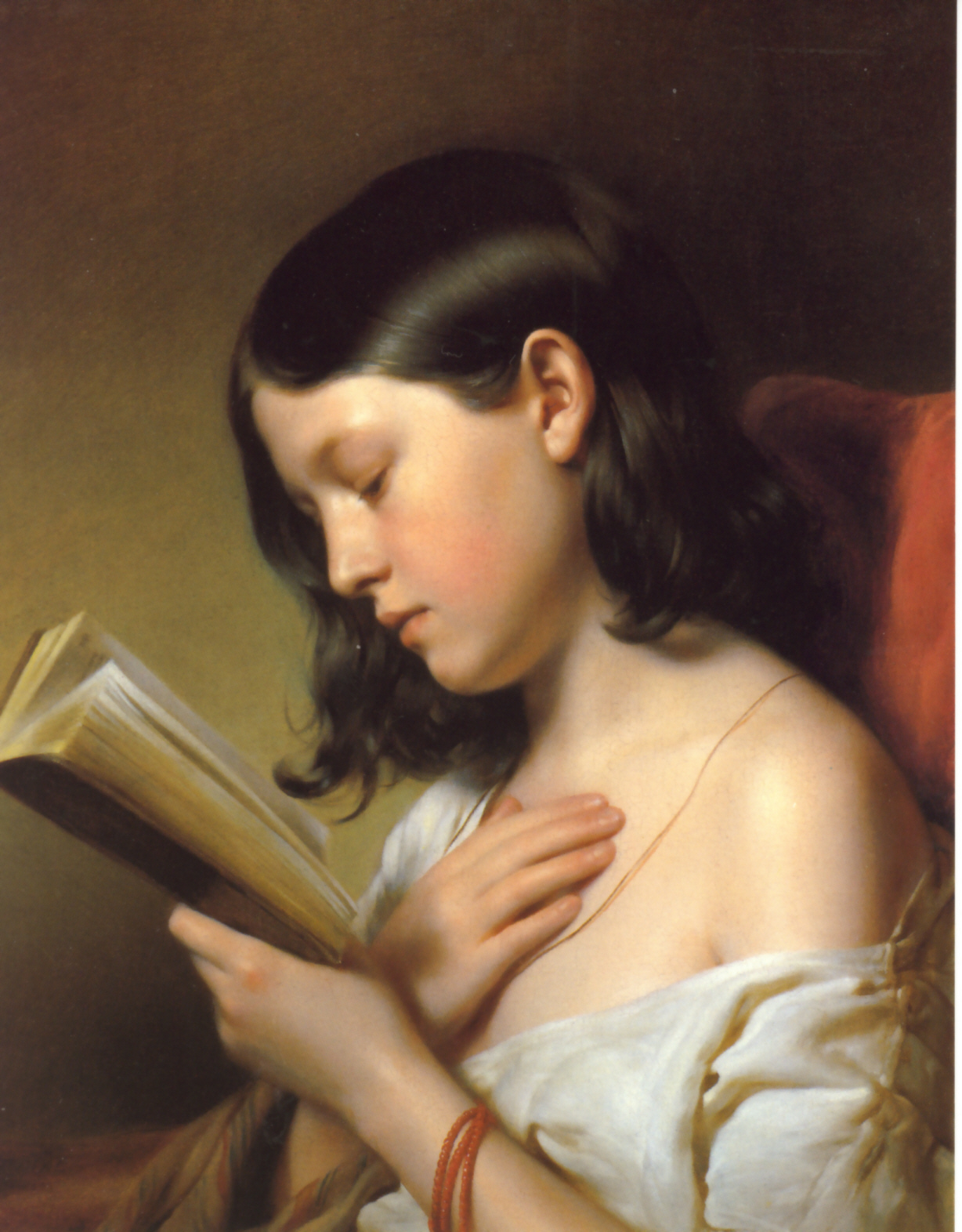
Lesendes Mädchen

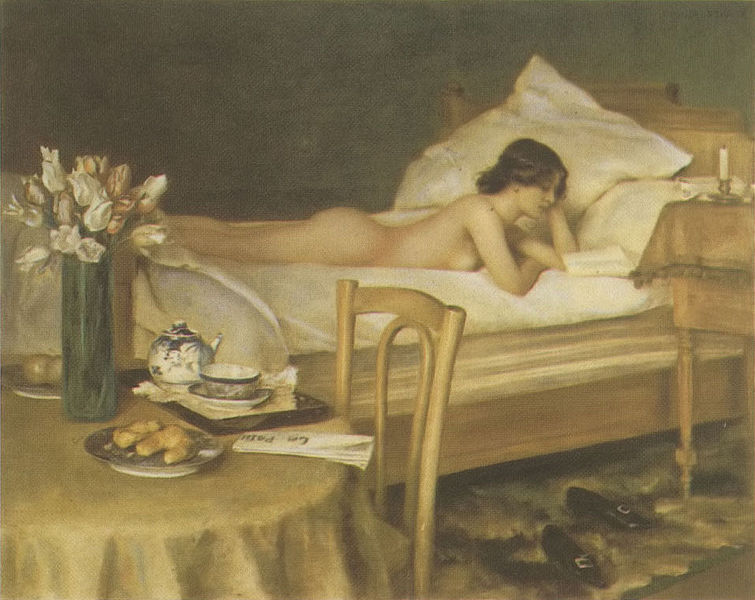
Nude reading, 1850

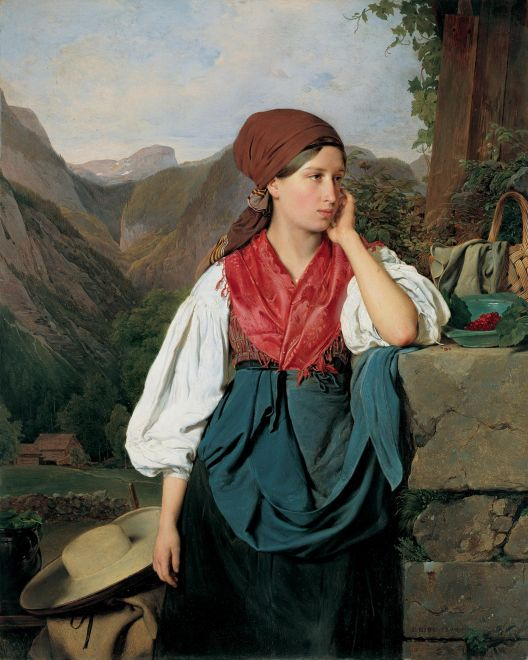
Berry picker in front of mountain landscape, 1844

- Ein slowakischer Zwiebelverkäufer ("A Slovak Onion-Seller"; Budapest, Szépmüvészeti Múzeum), 1835, oil on cardboard, 25 x 29.5 cm (10" x 11.5")
- Ramsauer Bäuerin am Spinnrad ("Farmer Woman from Ramsau at the Spinning Wheel"; Vienna, Österreichische Galerie Belvedere), around 1836, oil on wood
- Bildnis Frau Nadassy ("Portrait of Mrs Nadassy"; Vienna, Österreichische Galerie Belvedere), 1839, oil on wood, 29 x 23 cm (11.5" x 9")
- Selbstporträt mit Hut ("Self-portrait with Hat"; Vienna, Österreichische Galerie Belvedere), around 1840, oil on canvas, 70 x 56 cm (27" x 22")
- Selbstporträt vor rotem Grund (Vienna, Österreichische Galerie Belvedere), 1843, oil on canvas
- Bildnis einer Dame im Lehnstuhl (Vienna, Österreichische Galerie Belvedere), 1846, oil on canvas, 111 x 91 cm (43.5" x 36")
- Karl Gustav Wittmann auf dem Totenbett (Vienna Museum), 1847, watercolour
- Das Innere einer Schmiede (Vienna, Österreichische Galerie Belvedere), 1847, oil on canvas
- Lesendes Mädchen ("Reading Girl"; Vienna, Österreichische Galerie Belvedere), 1850, oil on canvas, 53 x 41 cm (21" x 16")
- Ein alter Bettler (Vienna, Österreichische Galerie Belvedere), 1856, oil on wood, 40 x 31 cm (15.5" x 12")
- Graf Miklós Wesselényi der Jüngere (Budapest, Hungarian National Museum), oil on linen, 94 x 75.5 cm (37" x 29.5")

== Bibliography ==
- Ulrich Thieme and Felix Becker: Allgemeines Lexikon der Bildenden Künstler von der Antike bis zur Gegenwart in 37 volumes 1907-1950
- Dr Ingrid Kastel; Franz Eybl 1806-1880; University of Vienna Arts Faculty dissertation, 1983
- Eybl, Franz. In Constantin von Wurzbach: Biographisches Lexikon des Kaisertums Österreich. Volume 4. Vienna 1858. Available online at literature.at (in German)
